= Amber Gray =

American actress

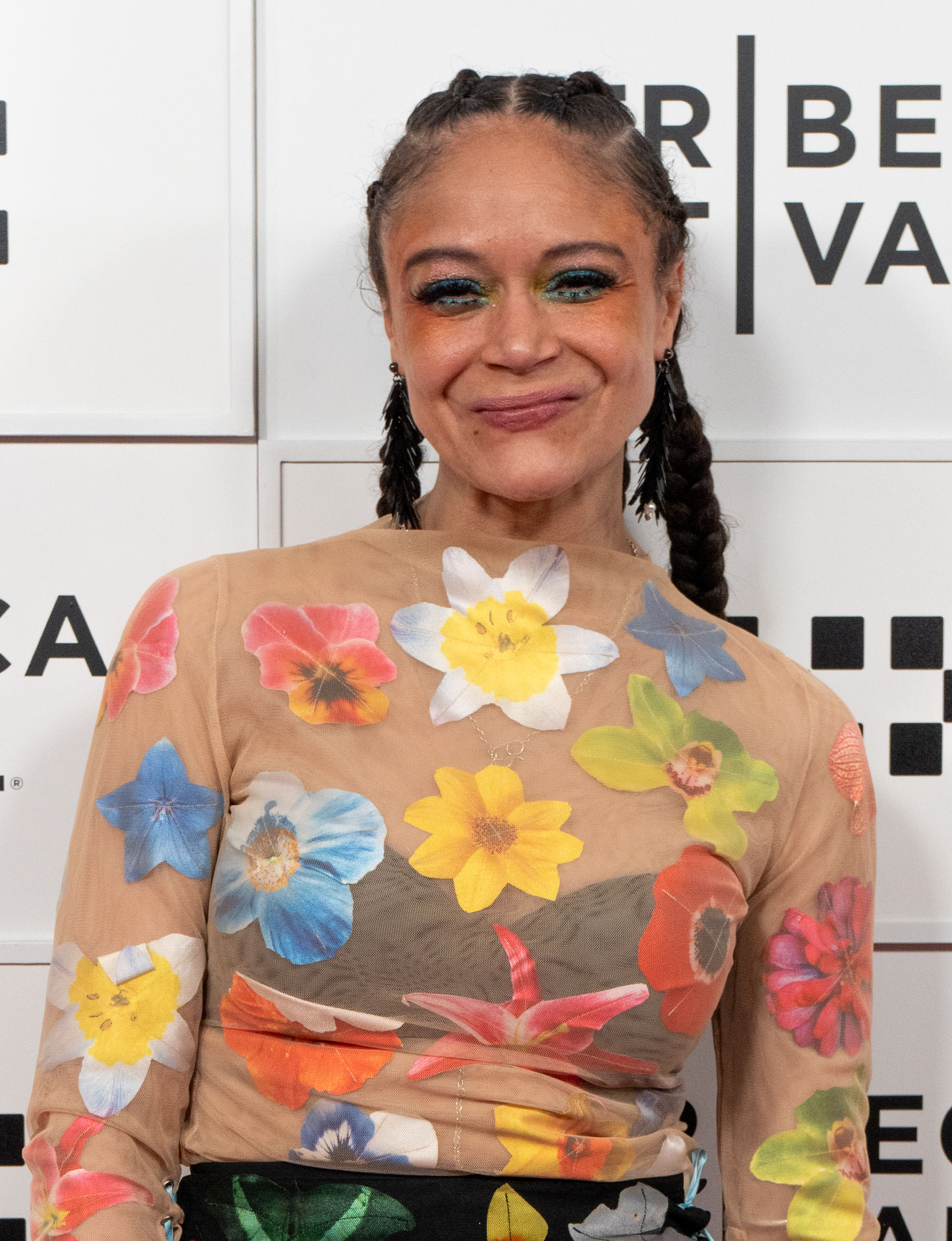
- Gray in 2026
- Education: Boston University (BFA); New York University (MFA)
- Occupation: Actress
- Partner: Galen Hamilton
- Children: 2

Amber Gray is an American actress. She is known for originating the role of Hélène Bezukhova in the musical Natasha, Pierre, & the Great Comet of 1812 and the role of Persephone in the musical Hadestown, both Off- and on Broadway. For the latter 2019 role, she was nominated for the Tony Award for Best Featured Actress in a Musical, additionally earning the 2020 Grammy Award for Best Musical Theater Album.

== Early life and education ==
Gray is a military brat and spent her early childhood across Europe and the United States.

She attended Boston University where she received a BFA in acting and New York University where she received an MFA in acting.

== Career ==
In 2007, she began her screen career by appearing in an episode of Law & Order: Special Victims Unit, titled "Haystack", as a character named Raye. She also worked as a photographer on Canada's Top Model in 2009 on the episode "Bright Lights: No Pity". In 2012, Gray first became involved with Natasha, Pierre, & the Great Comet of 1812. Gray portrayed Countess Hélène Bezukhova in the musical's performances at the Off-Off-Broadway Ars Nova Theater. Gray continued with Great Comet when it moved to Kazino Meatpacking in 2013, Kazino Times Square in 2014, and when it opened on Broadway in late 2016. Gray was awarded a 2017 Theatre World Award for her performance as Hélène.

In 2014, Gray reprised her leading role as Zoe in An Octoroon at Soho Repertory Theatre An Octoroon utilized the plot of The Octoroon, an 1859 melodrama, but turned it into a contemporary new play that discusses America's slave history and both past and present racism. In an interview with The New York Times, Gray spoke of the part's difficulty due to many intense racial scenes. Gray remained with the production when it went on to play at Theatre for a New Audience in 2015.

In 2016, Gray portrayed Persephone in New York Theatre Workshop's production of the new musical Hadestown, based on Anaïs Mitchell's album of the same name and the tragic myth of Orpheus and Eurydice. Gray was again directed by Rachel Chavkin, whom she collaborated with during Great Comet. Gray was praised by critics, who were impressed by her "vocal dexterity," "charisma," and "powerhouse voice". She reprised this role in the Edmonton Citadel Theatre, London National Theatre, and Broadway productions. For the Broadway production, she received a nomination for the Tony Award for Best Featured Actress in a Musical. She reprised the role for her West End debut in February and March 2025.

In 2021, Gray appeared in the Amazon limited series The Underground Railroad as Gloria Valentine.

Gray plays the role of Ajax on the 2024 concept album by Lin-Manuel Miranda and Eisa Davis, Warriors.

In April 2025, it was revealed that Gray would star in the world premiere of the A Wrinkle in Time musical at Washington, D.C.'s Arena Stage.

On June 16, 2025, it was announced that Gray would appear as Elmire alongside Matthew Broderick, Bianca Del Rio, and Francis Jue in a new production of Tartuffe at the New York Theatre Workshop.

On March 26, 2026, Gray began playing the character Riff Raff in The Rocky Horror Show on Broadway. She is expected to stay through the full run of the show.

== Personal life ==
Gray's partner is Galen Hamilton, whom she began dating in 2011. They have two children.

Gray is biracial.

== Theatre ==
Years	Production	Role	Theatre	Director	Ref.
2004	Ain't Misbehavin	Charlaine	Huntington Theatre Company	Marcia Milgrom Dodge	
2005	Lady Windermere's Fan	Lady Plymdale	Williamstown Theatre Festival	Moisés Kaufman	
2005	On The Razzle	Lisette	Williamstown Theatre Festival	David Jones	
2005	Prudence	Sarah	Connecticut Repertory Theatre	Tyler Marchant	
2006	Reverend Billy and the Stop Shopping Choir	Activist, Singer	Internationally	Savitri D	
2009	A Midsummer Night's Dream	Puck, Hippolyta, Theseus	Florence's Villa La Pietra, NYC Bandshells, Classic Stage Company	Jim Calder	
2010	An Octoroon	Zoe	P.S. 122	Branden Jacobs-Jenkins	
2010	Banished Children of Eve	Eliza	Irish Repertory Theatre, Off-Broadway	Ciaran O'Reilly	
2011	Sueño	The Sun	Atlas Theatre	Jack Fletcher	
2011–13	The TEAM's Mission Drift	Joan	P.S. 122's COIL Festival, London's National Theatre, Edinburgh's Traverse Theatre, Lisbon, Coimbra, Salzburg, Hong Kong, Perth, Williams College	Rachel Chavkin	
2012	All Hands	Greta	Hoi Polloi	Alec Duffy	
2012	We Play for the Gods	Simi	Women's Project	Jessi D. Hill, Sarah Rasmussen, Mia Rovegno	
2012	The World is Round	Rose Rose Rose	Ripe Time	Rachel Dickstein	
2012	Natasha, Pierre & The Great Comet of 1812	Hélène Kuragina Bezukhova	Ars Nova, Off-Broadway	Rachel Chavkin	
2012	Eager to Lose	Trixie	Ars Nova	Portia Krieger and Wes Grantom	
2013	Natasha, Pierre & The Great Comet of 1812	Hélène Kuragina Bezukhova	Kazino Meatpacking District, Off-Broadway	Rachel Chavkin	
2014	Natasha, Pierre & The Great Comet of 1812	Hélène Kuragina Bezukhova	Kazino Times Square, Off-Broadway	Rachel Chavkin	
2014	An Octoroon	Zoe	Soho Rep	Sarah Benson	
2014–15	A 24 Decade History of Popular Music: 1900s-1950s	Singer	New York Live Arts with Under the Radar	Taylor Mac, Niegel Smith	
2015	An Octoroon	Zoe	Theatre for a New Audience	Sarah Benson	
2015	Oklahoma!	Laurey Williams	Bard SummerScape	Daniel Fish	
2015	Iphigenia in Aulis	Clytemnestra, Menelaus	Classic Stage Company	Rachel Chavkin	
2016	Hadestown	Persephone	New York Theatre Workshop, Off-Broadway	Rachel Chavkin	
2016–17	Natasha, Pierre & The Great Comet of 1812	Hélène Kuragina Bezukhova	Imperial Theatre, Broadway	Rachel Chavkin	
2017	The TEAM's Primer for a Failed Superpower	Activist, Singer	Roulette	Rachel Chavkin	
2017	Hadestown	Persephone	Edmonton's Citadel Theatre	Rachel Chavkin	
2018–19	Hadestown	Persephone	Olivier Theatre, Royal National Theatre	Rachel Chavkin	
2019–22	Hadestown	Persephone	Walter Kerr Theatre, Broadway	Rachel Chavkin	
2019	Into the Wild	Performer	Playwrights Horizons	Lila Neugebauer	
2021	Against Women and Music	Celine Gray	Virtual production	Sarna Lapine	
2022	Macbeth	Banquo	Longacre Theatre, Broadway	Sam Gold	
2023	Jacques Brel is Alive and Well and Living in Paris	Performer	Benefit performance in Tangier, Morocco	Rob Ashford	
2023–24	Here We Are	Claudia Bursik-Zimmer	The Shed, Off-Broadway	Joe Mantello	
2024–25	Eureka Day	Carina	Samuel J. Friedman Theatre, Broadway	Anna D. Shapiro	
2025	Hadestown	Persephone	Lyric Theatre, West End	Rachel Chavkin	
2025	A Wrinkle in Time	Mrs. Whatsit	Arena Stage	Lee Sunday Evans	
2025	Tartuffe	Elmire	New York Theatre Workshop	Sarah Benson	
2026	The Rocky Horror Show	Riff Raff	Studio 54, Broadway	Sam Pinkleton	
2027	Warriors	Ajax	Lunt-Fontanne Theatre, Broadway	Jenny Koons, Andy Blankenbuehler	

== Filmography ==
Film
Year	Title	Role	Notes	Ref.
2011	Roger, the Chicken	Dr. Rose		
2013	The Weekend	Maggie		
2017	Walden: Life in the Woods	Melinda		
2021	Where There's Smoke	Jenifer	Short film	
2022	Master	Liv Beckman		
2026	Hadestown: The Musical	Persephone	Filmed stage production	

Television
Year	Title	Role	Notes	Ref.
2007	Law & Order: Special Victims Unit	Raye	Episode: "Haystack"	
2018	Escape at Dannemora	Annie	2 episodes	
2020	Ms. Guidance	Bethany Bump	6 episodes	
2021	Bull	Dr. Kinsey	Episode: "To Save a Life"	
2021	The Underground Railroad	Gloria Valentine	2 episodes	
2023	The Gilded Age	Bea Sturt	Episode: "Close Enough to Touch"	
2025	Long Bright River	Teacher Dana	3 episodes	

== Awards and nominations ==
Year	Award	Category	Work	Result	Ref.
2017	Theatre World Award	Outstanding Broadway or Off-Broadway Debut Performance	Natasha, Pierre & The Great Comet of 1812	Won	
2017	Lucille Lortel Awards	Outstanding Lead Actress in a Musical	Hadestown	Nominated	
2018	Sterling Awards	Outstanding Performance by an Actress in a Supporting Role	Hadestown	Won	
2019	Tony Awards	Best Featured Actress in a Musical	Hadestown	Nominated	
2019	Outer Critics Circle Awards	Outstanding Featured Actress in a Musical	Hadestown	Won	
2019	Drama League Awards	Distinguished Performance Award	Hadestown	Nominated	
2020	Grammy Award	Best Musical Theater Album	Hadestown	Won	
