= American Repertory Theater =

Professional not-for-profit theater in Cambridge, Massachusetts, USA

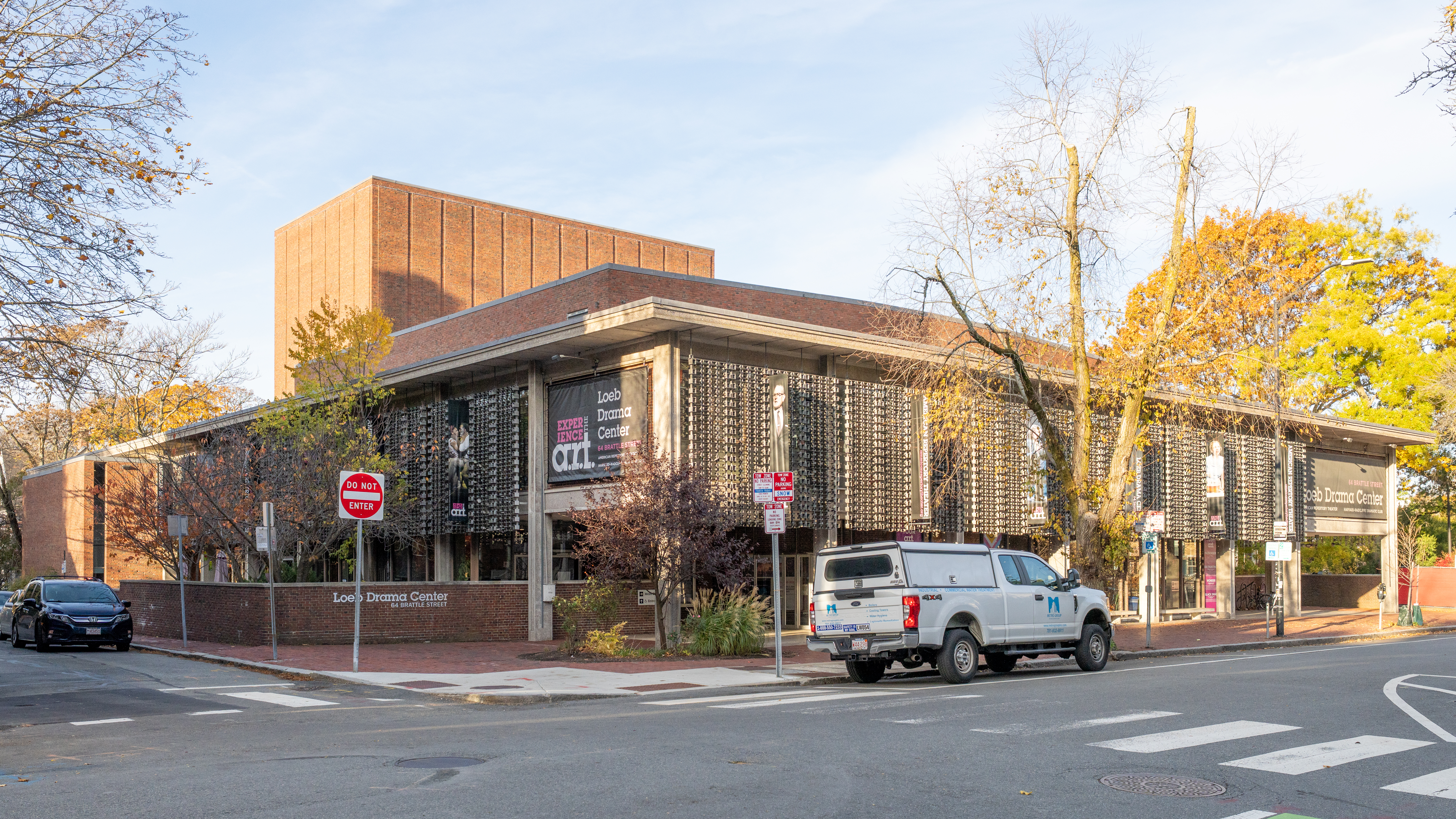
- Loeb Drama Center (2025)
- Formation: 1980
- Type: Regional theater
- Location: Cambridge, Massachusetts
- Artistic director: Diane Paulus
- Website: americanrepertorytheater.org

The American Repertory Theater (A.R.T.) is a professional not-for-profit theater in Cambridge, Massachusetts. Founded in 1980 by Robert Brustein, the A.R.T. is known for its commitment to new American plays and music–theater explorations; to neglected works of the past; and to established classical texts reinterpreted in refreshing new ways. Over the past forty years it has garnered many of the nation's most distinguished awards, including a Pulitzer Prize (1982), a Tony Award (1986), and a Jujamcyn Award (1985). In 2002, the A.R.T. was the recipient of the National Theatre Conference's Outstanding Achievement Award, and it was named one of the top five regional theaters in the country by Time magazine in 2003. The A.R.T. is housed in the Loeb Drama Center at Harvard University, a building it shares with the Harvard-Radcliffe Dramatic Club. The A.R.T. operates the Institute for Advanced Theater Training.

In 2002 Robert Woodruff replaced founder Robert Brustein as the A.R.T.'s artistic director. After Woodruff's departure in 2007, Associate Artistic Director Gideon Lester filled the position for the 2008/2009 season, and, in May 2008, Diane Paulus was named the new artistic director. Paulus, a Harvard alum, is widely known as a director of theater and opera. Her work includes The Donkey Show, which ran off-Broadway for six years; productions at the Chicago Opera Theatre; and the Public Theater's 2008 production of Hair, which won the Tony Award for Best Revival of a Musical.

== History ==
American Repertory Theater was established at Harvard in 1980 as a permanent professional arts organization on campus that offered undergraduate courses in acting, directing, and dramaturgy, taught by professional members of the company with teaching experience. Robert Brustein served as artistic director of the theater until 2002, when he was succeeded by Robert Woodruff, founder of the Bay Area Playwrights Festival. In 2008, Diane Paulus became the artistic director.

During its 44-year history, it has welcomed many major American and international theater artists, presenting a diverse repertoire that includes premieres of American plays and musical productions. In the over 250 productions American Repertory Theater has staged, over half were premieres of new plays, translations, and adaptations. The A.R.T. has performed throughout the U.S. and worldwide in 21 cities in 16 countries on four continents. It continues to be a training ground for young artists, with the artistic staff teaching undergraduate classes in acting, directing, dramatic literature, dramaturgy, voice, and design. In 1987, the A.R.T. founded the Institute for Advanced Theater Training at Harvard, which offers a five-semester M.F.A. graduate program that operates in conjunction with the Moscow Art Theatre School.

The current artistic director, Diane Paulus, has focused on expanding the boundaries of traditional theater by transforming the ways in which work is developed, programmed, produced, and contextualized in order to allow the audience to participate, thereby making the experience more interactive. Productions such as Sleep No More, The Donkey Show, Gatz, The Blue Flower, Prometheus Bound, Gershwin's Porgy and Bess, Wild Swans, and Pippin have engaged audiences in unique theatrical experiences through physical interaction and unconventional staging. The theater's productions have garnered eighteen Tony Awards, including Best Revival of a Musical for its productions of Pippin (2013) and Gershwins' Porgy and Bess (2012), Best Musical for Once (2012), and Best Play All The Way (2014). The A.R.T. also received the Tony Award for Outstanding Regional Theater, the Pulitzer Prize, and multiple Elliot Norton and IRNE awards. Its premiere production of Death and the Powers: The Robots' Opera was a 2012 Pulitzer Prize finalist.

== Productions ==
=== 2025–2026 season ===
- Black Swan. Music and lyrics by Dave Malloy, book by Jen Silverman, Music Supervision and Direction by Or Matias, and Directed and Choreographed by Sonya Tayeh. Based on Searchlight Pictures' Black Swan, Story by Andres Heinz.
- Wonder. Music and Lyrics by Ian Axel & Chad King, Book by Sarah Ruhl, Music Supervision by Nadia DiGiallonardo, Choreography by Katie Spelman, Directed by Taibi Magar. Based on the novel by R.J. Palacio and Lionsgate and Mandeville's Wonder.
- 300 Paintings. Created and Performed by Sam Kissajukian.
- Passengers. A Production by The 7 Fingers. Directed, Written, and Choreographed by Shana Carroll.

=== 2024–2025 season ===
- Two Strangers (Carry a Cake Across New York). Music by Jim Barne, Lyrics and Book by Kit Buchan, and Directed and Choreographed by Tim Jackson. (Pre-Broadway production)
- Night Side Songs. Words and Music by Daniel Lazour and Patrick Lazour, Directed by Taibi Magar.
- The Odyssey by Homer. Adapted by Kate Hamill, Directed by Shana Cooper.
- Diary of a Tap Dancer. Directed by Torya Beard, Written and Choreographed by Ayodele Casel.
- Romeo and Juliet by William Shakespeare. Directed by Diane Paulus, Choreography and Movement Direction by Sidi Larbi Cherkaoui.

=== 2023–2024 season ===
- Gatsby: An American Myth. Based on the novel by F. Scott Fitzgerald, music by Florence Welch and Thomas Bartlett, lyrics by Florence Welch, book by Martyna Majok, choreography by Sonya Tayeh, directed by Rachel Chavkin.
- Becoming a Man. Created by P. Carl, directed by Diane Paulus and P. Carl.
- Real Women Have Curves. Music and lyrics by Joy Huerta and Benjamin Velez, book by Lisa Boomer, choreography and direction by Sergio Trujillo. Based on the play by Josefina López and HBO's Real Women Have Curves. (Pre-Broadway production)
- The Half-God of Rainfall. Created by Inua Ellams, directed by Taibi Magar.

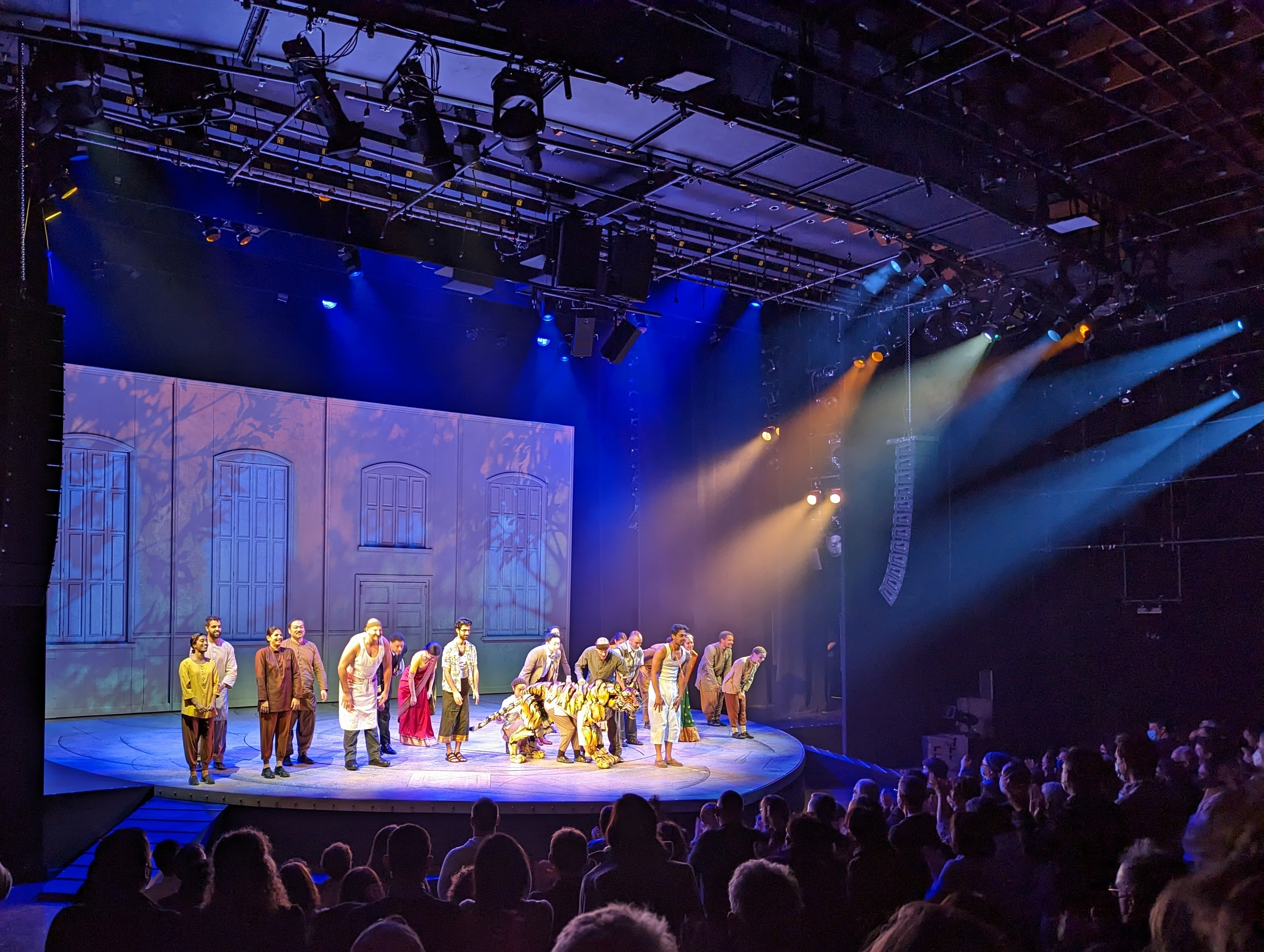
Life of Pi at A.R.T. in January 2023

=== 2022–2023 season ===
- Evita. Lyrics by Tim Rice, music by Andrew Lloyd Webber, directed by Sammi Cannold, choreographed by Emily Maltby and Valeria Solomonoff.
- The Wife of Willesden. Adapted by Zadie Smith from Chaucer's The Wife of Bath, directed by Indhu Rubasingham.
- Life of Pi. Based on the novel by Yann Martel, adapted by Lolita Chakrabarti, directed by Max Webster. (Pre-Broadway production)
- Twilight: Los Angeles, 1992. Conceived, written, and revised by Anna Deavere Smith, directed by Taibi Magar.

=== 2021–2022 season ===
- 1776. Music & lyrics by Sherman Edwards, book by Peter Stone, directed by Diane Paulus & Jeffrey L. Page, choreography by Jeffrey L. Page. (Pre-Broadway production)
- Ocean Filibuster. Created by PearlDamour, text by Lisa D'Amour, music by Sxip Shirey, directed by Katie Pearl.
- WILD: A Musical Becoming. Book by V, music by Justin Tranter & Caroline Pennell with contributions by Erin Cannata, lyrics by Justin Tranter, Caroline Pennell, & V with contributions by Idina Menzel, choreography by Chanel DaSilva, directed by Diane Paulus.
- Macbeth In Stride. Created & performed by Whitney White, orchestrations by Steven Cuevas and Whitney White, musically directed by Steven Cuevas, choreography by Raja Feather Kelly, directed by Tyler Dobrowsky & Taibi Magar.
- Chasing Magic. Created by Ayodele Casel, directed by Torya Beard.

=== 2020–2021 season ===
- Canceled due to COVID-19 pandemic.

=== 2019–2020 season ===
- Six. Written by Toby Marlow & Lucy Moss, choreography by Carrie-Anne Ingrouille, musically supervised by Joe Beighton, musically directed by Roberta Duchak, orchestrations by Tim Curran, directed by Lucy Moss & Jamie Armitage. (Pre-Broadway production)
- Black Light. Created by Daniel Alexander Jones, original songs by Jomama Jones. Featuring Bobby Halvorson, Laura Jean Anderson, Dylan Meek, and Josh Quat
- Moby-Dick. Music, lyrics, book, and orchestrations by Dave Malloy, musically directed by Or Matias, choreography by Chanel DaSilva, directed by Rachel Chavkin
- Thumbelina: A Little Musical. Book, music, and lyrics by Julia Riew, musically directed by Julia Riew & Ian Chan, choreography by Ryan Kapur, directed by Emma Watt
- Gloria: A Life. Written by Emily Mann, directed by Diane Paulus

=== 2018–2019 season ===
- The Black Clown. Adapted by Davóne Tines & Michael Schachter, music by Michael Schacter, musically directed by Jaret Landon, choreography by Chanel DaSilva, directed by Zack Winokur.
- ExtraOrdinary. Written by Dick Scanlan, choreography by Abbey O'Brien, musically directed by Lance Horne, directed by Diane Paulus. Featuring Patina Miller, Norm Lewis, Rachel Bay Jones, Lea DeLaria, Gavin Creel, Carolee Carmello, and Elizabeth Stanley
- Barber Shop Chronicles. Written by Inua Ellams, directed by Bijan Sheibani, design by Rae Smith
- The Emperor's New Clothes. Book by Eliya Smith, music by Sasha Yakub, lyrics by Sarah Rossman, choreography by Ryan Kapur, directed by Mitchell Pononsky
- Othello. Written by William Shakespeare, directed by Bill Rauch
- Endlings. Written by Celine Song, directed by Sammi Cannold. Featuring Wai Ching Ho, Emily Kuroda, Jiehae Park, and Jo Yang
- We Live in Cairo. Book, music, & lyrics by Daniel Lazour & Patrick Lazour, musical arrangements by Daniel Lazour & Michael Starobin, musically directed Madeline Smith, choreography by Samar Haddad King, and directed by Taibi Magar

=== 2017–2018 season ===
- Burn All Night. Book & lyrics by Andy Mientus, music by Van Hughes, Nicholas LaGrasta, and Brett Moses. Directed by Jenny Koons
- WARHOLCAPOTE: A Non-Fiction Invention. Adapted by Rob Roth, directed by Michael Mayer, starring Stephen Spinella and Dan Butler
- Bedlam's Sense & Sensibility. Adapted by Kate Hamill, directed by Eric Tucker.
- Charlotte's Web. Adapted by Joseph Robinette, directed by Dmirty Troyanovsky
- Hear Word! Naija Woman Talk True. Written & directed by Ifeoma Fafunwa
- The White Card. Written by Claudia Rankine, directed by Diane Paulus. Starring Karen Pittman, Daniel Gerroll, Patricia Kalember, Jim Poulos, and Colton Ryan.
- Jagged Little Pill. Music by Alanis Morissette & Glen Ballard, lyrics by Alanis Morissette, book by Diablo Cody, musical supervision by Tom Kitt, choreography by Sidi Larbi Cherkaoui, directed by Diane Paulus. (Pre-Broadway production.)

=== 2016–2017 season ===
- Notes from the Field: Doing Time in Education, Created, written, and performed by Anna Deavere Smith with music composed and performed by Marcus Shelby. Directed by Leonard Foglia.
- Abbey Theatre's The Plough and the Stars, written by Seán O'Casey. Directed by Sean Holmes.
- Fingersmith, Based on the novel by Sarah Waters, written by Alexa Junge. Directed by Bill Rauch.
- Trans Scripts, Part I: The Women, Written by Paul Lucas. Directed by Jo Bonney.
- The Night of the Iguana, Written by Tennessee Williams. Directed by Michael Wilson and featuring James Earl Jones.
- Arrabal, Book by John Weidman, music by Gustavo Santaolalla. Directed and co-choreographed by Sergio Trujillo and choreographed by Julio Zurita.

=== 2015–2016 season ===
- Waitress, by Jessie Nelson with music and lyrics by Sara Bareilles. Directed by Diane Paulus and featuring Jessie Mueller. (Pre-Broadway production)
- Natasha, Pierre & The Great Comet of 1812, music and libretto by Dave Malloy. Directed by Rachel Chavkin. (Pre-Broadway production)
- Nice Fish, Conceived, written, and adapted by Mark Rylance and Louis Jenkins. Directed by Claire van Kampen.
- 1984, by Robert Icke and Duncan Macmillan. Presented in association with Headlong Almeida Theatre and Nottingham Playhouse.
- RoosevElvis, Created by the TEAM. Directed by Rachel Chavkin.
- In the Body of the World Written and performed by Eve Ensler. Directed by Diane Paulus.

=== 2014–2015 season ===
- Finding Neverland, book by James Graham. Music and lyrics by Gary Barlow and Eliot Kennedy. Directed by Diane Paulus
- O.P.C. by Eve Ensler. Directed by Pesha Rudnik.
- The Light Princess, book by Lila Rose Kaplan. Music and lyrics by Mike Pettry. Directed by Allegra Libonati.
- Father Comes Home from the Wars (Parts 1, 2 & 3) by Susan-Lori Parks. Directed by Jo Bonney.
- The Last Two People on Earth: An Apocalyptic Vaudeville, conceived by Paul Ford, Taylor Mac, Mandy Patinkin, and Susan Stroman. Directed by Susan Stroman.
- Crossing, a new American opera, music and libretto by Matthew Aucoin. Directed by Diane Paulus.

=== 2013–2014 season ===
- All the Way, by Robert Schenkkan. Directed by Bill Rauch and featuring Bryan Cranston.
- The Heart of Robin Hood, by David Farr. Directed by Gisli Örn Gardarsson.
- Witness Uganda, by Matt Gould and Griffin Matthews. Directed by Diane Paulus.
- The Shape She Makes, conceived and choreographed by Susan Misner. Conceived, written and directed by Jonathan Bernstein.
- The Tempest, by William Shakespeare. Adapted and directed by Aaron Posner and Teller. Magic by Teller and music by Tom Waits.

=== 2012–2013 season ===
- Marie Antoinette, by David Adjmi. Directed by Rebecca Taichman.
- The Lily's Revenge, written and conceived by Taylor Mac. Directed by Shira Milikowsky.
- Pippin, directed by Diane Paulus. Book by Roger O. Hirson. Music and lyrics by Stephen Schwartz.
- The Glass Menagerie, by Tennessee Williams. Directed by John Tiffany and featuring Cherry Jones, Celia Keenan-Bolger and Zachary Quinto.
- Beowulf: A Thousand Years of Baggage, by Banana Bag & Bodice. Text by Jason Craig, music by Dave Malloy. Directed by Rod Hipskind and Mallory Catlett.
- Pirates of Penzance, by Gilbert and Sullivan. Directed by Sean Graney and featuring the Hypocrites.

=== 2011–2012 season ===
- The Gershwins' Porgy and Bess, directed by Diane Paulus and featuring Audra McDonald, Norm Lewis, and David Alan Grier.
- Three Pianos, by Rick Burkhardt, Alec Duffy and Dave Malloy. Directed by Rachel Chavkin.
- The Snow Queen. Adapted by Tyler Monroe. Directed by Allegra Libonati. Puppets by Michael Kane.
- As You Like It, by William Shakespeare. Directed by David Hammond, featuring members of the A.R.T./MXAT Institute for Advanced Theater Training
- Wild Swans, by Jung Chang & adapted by Alexandra Wood. Directed by Sacha Wares.
- Futurity: A Musical by The Lisps. Music and lyrics by César Alvarez with the Lisps. Book by Molly Rice and César Alvarez. Directed by Sarah Benson.
- Woody Sez. Devised by David M. Lutken with Nick Corley. Words and Music by Woody Guthrie.

=== 2010–2011 season ===
- Cabaret, directed by Steven Bogart, featuring Amanda Palmer as the emcee. Opened August 31, 2010 at Club Oberon
- Alice vs. Wonderland, remixed by Brendan Shea, directed by János Szász
- The Blue Flower, by Jim and Ruth Bauer, directed by Will Pomerantz
- R. Buckminster Fuller: The History (and Mystery) of the Universe, written and directed by D.W. Jacobs
- Ajax, directed by Sarah Benson
- Prometheus Bound, directed by Diane Paulus, starring Gavin Creel and Lea Delaria. A.R.T. and collaborator Serj Tankian of System of a Down dedicated the production to eight Amnesty International cases: David Kato, Norma Cruz, Jafar Panahi, Dhondup Wangchen, Tran Quoc Hien, Doan Van Dien, Doan Huy Chuong, Nasrin Sotoudeh, Reggie Clemons, and survivors of sexual violence in the Democratic Republic of the Congo. They stated in program notes that "by singing the story of Prometheus, the God who defied the tyrant Zeus by giving the human race both fire and art, this production hopes to give a voice to those currently being silenced or endangered by modern-day oppressors".
- Death and the Powers: The Robots' Opera

=== 2009–2010 season ===
The A.R.T.'s 30th season, its first under Artistic Director Diane Paulus, eschewed the traditional model and instead offered a series of "festivals" which encouraged audiences to experience productions as parts of larger cultural events.

==== Festival No. 01: Shakespeare Exploded ====
- The Donkey Show directed by Diane Paulus and Randy Weiner. Opened August 21, 2009 at the Zero Arrow Theater, renamed Club Oberon.
- Sleep No More by Punchdrunk directed by Felix Barrett, Maxine Doyle, and The Company. Opened October 8, 2009 in the Old Lincoln School, Brookline, Massachusetts..
- The Best of Both Worlds by Randy Weiner and Diedre Murray. Co-written and directed by Diane Paulus. Opened November 21, 2009 at the Loeb Drama Center.

==== Festival No. 02: America: Boom, Bust, and Baseball ====
- Gatz by Elevator Repair Service. Directed by John Collins. Opened January 8, 2010 at the Loeb Drama Center.
- Paradise Lost by Clifford Odets, directed by Daniel Fish. Opened February 27, 2010 at the Loeb Drama Center.
- Johnny Baseball by Richard Dresser, Robert Reale, and Willie Reale. Directed by Diane Paulus. Opens May 14, 2010 at the Loeb Drama Center.

=== 2008–2009 season ===
- Let Me Down Easy featuring Anna Deavere Smith directed by Eric Ting September 12 – October 11, 2009 at the Loeb Drama Center.
- Communist Dracula Pageant by Anne Washburn directed by Anne Kauffman. October 18 – November 9 at the Zero Arrow Theater.
- Aurélia's Oratorio written and directed by Victoria Thierrée Chaplin starring Aurélia Thierrée. November 28 – January 3 at the Loeb Drama Center.
- The Seagull directed by János Szász. January 10 – February 1 at the Loeb Drama Center.
- Endgame by Samuel Beckett. Directed by Marcus Stern. February 14 – March 15 at the Loeb Drama Center.
- Trojan Barbie by Christine Evans, directed by Carmel O'Reilly. March 28 – April 22 at the Zero Arrow Theater.
- Romance by David Mamet. Directed by Scott Zigler. May 9–31 at the Loeb Drama Center.

=== 2007–2008 season ===
- Don Juan Giovanni and Figaro directed by Dominique Serrand in association with Theatre de la Jeune Lune. In repertory August 31 – October 6, 2007 at the Loeb Drama Center.
- Donnie Darko adapted and directed by Marcus Stern, based on the film by Richard Kelly. October 27 – November 18 at the Zero Arrow Theater.
- No Child... written and performed by Nilaja Sun. November 23 – December 23 at the Loeb Drama Center.
- Copenhagen written by Michael Frayn and directed by Scott Zigler. January 5 – February 3 at the Loeb Drama Center.
- Julius Caesar by William Shakespeare. Directed by Arthur Nauzyciel. February 9 – March 22 at the Loeb Drama Center.
- Elections & Erections: A Chronicle of Fear & Fun by Pieter-Dirk Uys. April 2 – May 4 at the Zero Arrow Theater.
- Cardenio by Charles Mee and Stephen Greenblatt. Directed by Les Waters. May 10 – June 1 at the Loeb Drama Center.

== Notable collaborators ==
The American Repertory Theater has presented both American and World premiere productions. Over the years, these have included works by Robert Auletta, Robert Brustein, Anton Chekhov, Don DeLillo, Keith Dewhurst, Christopher Durang, Elizabeth Egloff, Peter Feibleman, Jules Feiffer, Dario Fo, Carlos Fuentes, Larry Gelbart, Leslie Glass, Philip Glass, Stuart Greenman, William Hauptman, Allan Havis, Milan Kundera, Mark Leib, Gideon Lester, David Lodge, Carol K. Mack, David Mamet, Charles L. Mee, Roger Miller, Dave Malloy, John Moran, Robert Moran, Heiner Müller, Marsha Norman, Han Ong, Amanda Palmer, David Rabe, Franca Rame, Adam Rapp, Keith Reddin, Ronald Ribman, Paula Vogel, Derek Walcott, Naomi Wallace, and Robert Wilson.

Reputable stage directors who have collaborated with A.R.T. include: JoAnne Akalaitis, Andrei Belgrader, Anne Bogart, Steven Bogart, Lee Breuer, Robert Brustein, Liviu Ciulei, Ron Daniels, Liz Diamond, Joe Dowling, Michael Engler, Alvin Epstein, Dario Fo, Richard Foreman, David Gordon, Adrian Hall, Richard Jones, Michael Kahn, Jerome Kilty, Krystian Lupa, John Madden, David Mamet, Des McAnuff, Jonathan Miller, Tom Moore, David Rabe, François Rochaix, Robert Scanlan, János Szász, Peter Sellars, Andrei Şerban, Sxip Shirey, Susan Sontag, Marcus Stern, Slobodan Unkovski, Les Waters, David Wheeler, Frederick Wiseman, Robert Wilson, Robert Woodruff, Steven Mitchell Wright, Yuri Yeremin, Francesca Zambello, and Scott Zigler.

Notable producers include: Henry Louis Gates Jr., Tom McGrath, Lawrence E. Golub, David Goel, Gerald Jordan, Andrew Ory, Bethany M. Allen, and Sharlyn Heslam.

== Educational institution ==
In 1987, the A.R.T. founded the Institute for Advanced Theater Training, a five-semester professional training program which includes a three-month period working and training at the Moscow Art Theatre School in Russia. The program provides training for graduate-level actors, dramaturgs, and voice students. From 1999 until 2016, this joint program conferred an M.F.A. from the Moscow Art Theatre School, along with a certificate of completion from Harvard. Beginning with the graduating class of 2017, students have been granted a master of liberal arts degree through the Harvard Extension School.

In July 2017, the U.S. Department of Education voiced concern over the worrisomely high debt-load of students completing the program. In response, the A.R.T. Institute announced a three-year pause in admissions, while it sought to improve student financial aid. It continues to negotiate with Harvard University about establishing an M.F.A. degree.

Notable Alumni

- Jon Bernthal (Punisher, Walking Dead)
- Steven Zahn (White Lotus, Silo)
- Zuzanna Szadkowski(The Knick, Gossip Girl)
- Amen Igbinosun (The Last Ship)
- Katori Hall (playwright: The Mountaintop, Tina)

== Performance venues ==
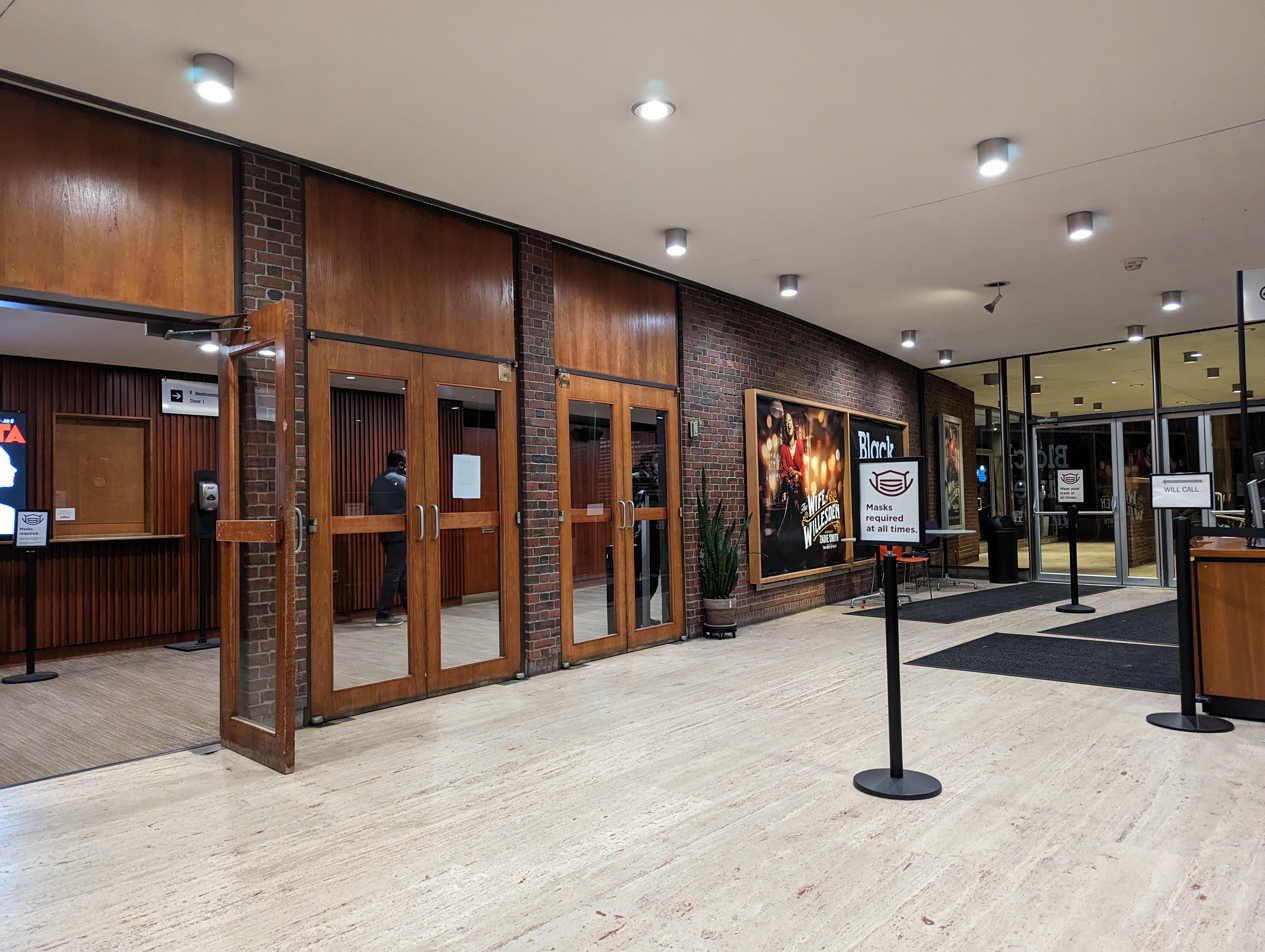
The Loeb Center lobby

=== OBERON ===
OBERON, sometimes referred to as Club Oberon, was a club theater venue that was built by the Carr Foundation in 2004 and opened in August 2009 as A.R.T.'s second venue. The A.R.T. opened the space in 2006 as the Zero Arrow Street Theater. The Onion Cellar was staged there Dec 2006-Jan 2007. A.R.T. originally used OBERON for the open ended residency of their production of The Donkey Show; however, American Repertory soon decided to convert the theater into a fully functioning club theater venue, fitting the philosophy developed by The Donkey Show's creator Randy Weiner.

In 2021, The A.R.T. decided not to renew its lease and Oberon was closed.

=== Other venues ===
Before OBERON, A.R.T. used the old Hasty Pudding theater as a second space in addition to the Loeb Mainstage. A.R.T.'s Institute for Advanced Theater Training formerly used the sub-basement of the First Parish in Cambridge at Zero Church Street, as a flexible venue. In May, 2015 the A.R.T. staged an opera premiere at the Shubert Theater in Boston, their first use of that venue.
