= Incubator Arts Project =

Off-Off-Broadway theater in Manhattan, New York City

Coordinates: 40.730311°N 73.987084°W

- Ontological Theater, Incubator
- Interactive map of Incubator Arts Project
- Address: 131 East 10th Street; New York City; United States
- Capacity: 80
- Type: Off-Off-Broadway

Construction
- Opened: 1992
- Closed: 2014
- Reopened: 2010
- Years active: 1992-2014

Website
- www.incubatorarts.org

The Incubator Arts Project was an Off-Off-Broadway theater located above St. Mark's Church-in-the-Bowery in the East Village of Manhattan, New York City.

== History ==
=== Ontological Theater (1992-2005) ===
In 1992, Richard Foreman founded the Ontological Theater at St. Marks as a home for his theater company, the Ontological-Hysteric Theater. The space hosted 18 of Foreman's original works, in addition to curating works by several emerging downtown theater companies and artists, including Radiohole, Elevator Repair Service, Nature Theater of Oklahoma, Richard Maxwell and Young Jean Lee.

=== Incubator (2005-2010) ===
The theater's many emerging artists programs were restructured in 2005 by artistic directors Morgan von Prelle Pecelli and Shannon Sindelar under the umbrella "Incubator," including a residency program for premieres, two annual music festivals, a regular concert series, a serial work-in-progress program called Short Form, and various roundtables and salons.

=== Incubator Arts Project (2010-2014) ===
In 2010, Richard Foreman's theater company left the theater at St. Marks, and the theater was renamed the Incubator Arts Project, led by director-producers Sindelar and Samara Naeymi, designer Peter Ksander, production manager Brendan Regimbal, and composer Travis Just. The newly formed company received a 2010 Obie Award grant and continued to curate a season of new emerging artists, through their New Performance Series, Short Form, Music, and an annual festival, Other Forces. Presented artists included Banana Bag & Bodice, The Debate Society, Daniel Fish, Half Straddle, Hoi Polloi, Object Collection, Buran Theatre, Theater of a Two-Headed Calf, Vampire Cowboys, and Witness Relocation.

In early 2014, the Incubator Arts Project announced it would be closing on July 1, 2014. The former Incubator Arts space is now occupied by the offices and dance school of the New York Theater Ballet.

== Notable Productions ==
- The Mind King by Richard Foreman, January 1992. Inaugural production.
- McGurk: A Cautionary Tale by Elevator Repair Service, 1994.
- Shut Up I Tell You (I Said Shut Up I Tell You) by Elevator Repair Service, 1995.
- The Four Twins by Copi, directed by Sophie Hoviland, June 1996.
- The Train Station by Pavol Liska (Co-Artistic Director of Nature Theater of Oklahoma), July 1996.
- Billings by Richard Maxwell, October 1997.
- Pageant by Ken Nintzel, June 2000.
- St. Scarlet by Julia Jordan, June 2003.
- Groundwork of the Metaphysic of Morals by Young Jean Lee, July 2003.
- Panel.Animal by Banana Bag & Bodice, July 2005.
- The Sewers by Banana Bag & Bodice, July 2006.
- Dysphoria by Alec Duffy (Artistic Director of Hoi Polloi and founder of JACK), August 2007.
- Vicious Dogs on Premises by Witness Relocation, May 2008.
- The Knockout Blow by Tina Satter, August 2008. Obie Award winning company Half Straddle's first production.
- Astronome: A Night at the Opera by Richard Foreman, March 2009. Foreman's final show at the space.
- The less we talk by Hoi Polloi, April 2009.
- Family by Half Straddle, August 2009.
- Laika Dog in Space by The Neo-Futurists, October 2009.
- Trifles by Theater of a Two-Headed Calf, January 2010. Obie Award winning company.
- Three Pianos by Rick Burkhardt, Alec Duffy and Dave Malloy, February 2010. Obie Award, Special Citation.
- The Really Big Once by Target Margin, April 2010. Obie Award winning company.
- Buddy Cop 2 by The Debate Society, June 2010. Obie Award winning company.
- The Little Death, Vol. 1 by Matt Marks (of Alarm Will Sound), July 2010.
- Aw Keats! Keats, Motherf***er by filmmaker Stiven Luka with Evan D. Watkins (performer/screenwriter), September 2010.
- The Inexplicable Redemption of Agent G by Vampire Cowboys Theatre Company, April 2011.
- All Hands by Hoi Polloi, March 2012.
- Grimly Handsome by Julia Jarcho, January 2013. Obie Award, Best New American Play.
- Eternal by Daniel Fish, August 2013.
- Black Wizard / Blue Wizard by Eliza Bent and Dave Malloy, December 2013.
- Magic Bullets by Buran Theatre, May 2014.
- Katorga by OZET, June 2014. Final show in the space.
