= Preludes (musical) =

- A musical fantasia set in the hypnotized mind of Sergei Rachmaninoff
- Music: Dave Malloy
- Lyrics: Dave Malloy
- Book: Dave Malloy
- Productions: 2015 Off-Broadway; 2017 Austria; 2018 Richmond, Virginia; 2019 Off West End

Preludes is a musical fantasia set in the mind of Sergei Rachmaninoff, written and composed by Dave Malloy. The music is a combination of compositions by Rachmaninoff, Malloy, hybrids of the two, as well as music and lyrics from other related compositions.

== Synopsis ==
After the disastrous premiere of his first symphony, the young Rachmaninoff suffers from writer's block. He begins daily sessions with a therapeutic hypnotist, in an effort to overcome depression and return to composing.

== Musical numbers ==
Music and lyrics by Dave Malloy except where noted.

Act I

1. "Your Day" — Rach
  suggested by Rachmaninoff’s Piano Concerto no. 2 in C minor, op. 18, 1st Movement, opening phrase,
  and Bach’s 2-Part Invention no. 9 in F minor, BWV 780
2. "Lilacs" — Rach, Natalya
  suggested by Rachmaninoff’s "Lilacs" from 12 Songs, op. 21, no. 5
3. Prelude in Bb major, op. 23, no. 2†§
4. "Ho-Ho" — Chaliapin, Chekhov
5. "Blocked"†
6. "Vocalise," from 14 Romances, op. 34, no. 14 — Natalya§
  Arranged by Dave Malloy
7. Étude-tableau in B♭ minor, op. 39 no. 4†§
8. "Subway" — Rach
9. Prelude in G♯ minor, op. 32 no. 12§
10. Prelude in G minor, op. 23, no. 5†§
11. "Trepak" from Songs and Dances of Death†
  Music by Modest Mussorgsky
  Lyrics by Arseny Golenishchev-Kutuzov
12. Piano Concerto no. 2 in C minor, op. 18, 1st movement, 1st theme†§
13. Moment Musical in B♭ minor, op. 16, no. 1†§
14. "Tchaikovsky’s Child’s Song" — Tchaikovsky, Rach
15. "Natalya" — Natalya
  suggested by Rachmaninoff’s Piano Concerto no. 2 in C minor, op. 18, 2nd movement
  and Cello Sonata, op. 19, 2nd movement

Act II

16. "Loop" — Chaliapin
  suggested by Rachmaninoff’s Rhapsody on a Theme of Paganini, op. 43
  and Piano Concerto no. 3 in D minor, op. 30
17. "Not Alone" — Rach, Natalya§
  Adapted from Moment Musical in Db major, op. 16, no. 5
18. "The Prelude" — Rach§
  Prelude in C♯ minor, op. 3, no. 2
  Text by Dave Malloy
19. "Fate" from 12 Songs, op. 21, no. 1†§
  suggested by Beethoven's Symphony no. 5, op. 67
  Lyrics by Aleksy Apukthin
20. "The First Symphony" — Rach, Chaliapin, Natalya, Glazunov, Dahl
  Suggested by Rachmaninoff’s Symphony no. 1
21. Symphony no. 6 in F major, op. 68, 2nd movement†
  By Ludwig van Beethoven
  Arranged for piano four hands by Selmar Bagge
22. "Blagoslovi, dushe moya, Gospoda" from Vespers, op. 37, no. 2 — Company§
  Arranged by Dave Malloy
23. "Hypnosis" — Dahl
  suggested by Rachmaninoff’s Prelude in G minor, op. 23, no. 5, 2nd theme
24. "Mountains" — Rachmaninoff
  suggested by Rachmaninoff’s "I Came To Her" from 12 Songs, op. 14, no. 4
25. Piano Concerto no. 2 in C minor, op. 18, 1st movement, 2nd theme§

†Not included on the Original Cast Recording
§ Music by Sergei Rachmaninoff

== Principal roles and cast members ==
Character	Off-Broadway (2015)	Off West End (2019)
Rach	Gabriel Ebert	Keith Ramsay
Rachmaninoff	Or Matias	Tom Noyes
Dahl	Eisa Davis	Rebecca Caine
Natalya	Nikki M. James	Georgia Louise
Chaliapin	Joseph Keckler	Norton James
Chekhov / Tchaikovsky / Tolstoy / Glazunov / Tsar Nicholas II / The Master	Chris Sarandon	Steven Serlin

== Productions ==
The piece premiered Off-Broadway in June 2015 at Lincoln Center Theater 3. The production team was helmed by Rachel Chavkin as director, Or Matias as music director, Bradley King as lighting designer, Mimi Lien as set designer, and Paloma Young as costume designer, all of whom had already collaborated with Malloy on Natasha, Pierre and the Great Comet of 1812.

In January 2017, the show made its European and German-language premiere at the Landestheater Linz, Austria. It was directed by Johannes von Matuschka and music directed by Billy Christopher Maupin.

In 2018, Preludes was performed at Richmond, Virginia's Firehouse Theatre from May 23 to June 30. It was directed by Billy Christopher Maupin and music directed by Susan Randolph Braden. The production team also featured Emily Dandridge as choreographer, Tennessee Dixon as set and projection designer, Christian DeAngelis as lighting designer, Leslie Cook-Day as costume designer, and Ryan Dygert as sound designer.

Preludes premiered Off West End at the Southwark Playhouse on September 6, 2019, in a limited run until October 12. The creative team was led by Alex Sutton as director and Jordan Li-Smith as music director, along with Christopher Nairne as lighting designer, Rebecca Brower as costume designer, Andrew Johnson as sound designer, Ste Clough as choreographer, Daisy On as stage manager. This production returned as a staged concert for three performances, live-streamed by the Southwark Playhouse due to the COVID-19 pandemic on May 8 and 9, 2021.

== Critical response ==
The piece was well received by the New York press; Ben Brantley in the New York Times wrote "Writer's block turns out to be a lot more inspiring than you could ever have imagine—and sad and stirring and gloriously fun. In Preludes, Dave Malloy makes beautiful music out of a composer's three years of creative silence ... the best musical about art's agonies since Georges Seurat wielded a twitchy paintbrush in Stephen Sondheim and James Lapine’s Sunday in the Park With George. Mr. Malloy ... incorporates wildly diverse sources—classical, folk, electro-pop—into a form that exists defiantly beyond the quotation marks of postmodernism. He's that rarity, a smart sentimentalist whose self-consciousness about his feelings in no way dilutes them ... Along with Fun Home and the soaring, Broadway-bound Hamilton, this smashing production says that the American musical is not only not dead but also growing luxuriantly in places you never expected."

The London production received similarly strong reviews; Time Out and WhatsOnStage gave the production 4 stars and other reviewers gave it 5 stars.

== Awards and nominations ==
=== Off-Broadway Production ===
Year	Award	Category	Nominee	Result
2016	Lucille Lortel Award	Outstanding Lead Actor in a Musical	Gabriel Ebert	Nominated
2016	Lucille Lortel Award	Outstanding Featured Actor in a Musical	Or Matias	Nominated
2016	Lucille Lortel Award	Outstanding Featured Actor in a Musical	Chris Sarandon	Nominated
2016	Lucille Lortel Award	Outstanding Featured Actress in a Musical	Eisa Davis	Nominated
2016	Off-Broadway Alliance Awards	Best Unique Theatrical Experience		Nominated

=== Richmond Production ===
Year	Award	Category	Nominee	Result
2018	Richmond Theatre Critics Circle Award	Best Musical	Preludes	Nominated
2018	Richmond Theatre Critics Circle Award	Best Director of a Musical	Billy Christopher Maupin	Won
2018	Richmond Theatre Critics Circle Award	Best Music Direction	Susan Braden	Won
2018	Richmond Theatre Critics Circle Award	Best Choreography	Emily Berg-Boff Dandridge	Nominated
2018	Richmond Theatre Critics Circle Award	Best Actor in a Musical	PJ Freebourn	Won
2018	Richmond Theatre Critics Circle Award	Best Supporting Actor in a Musical	Travis West	Nominated
2018	Richmond Theatre Critics Circle Award	Best Supporting Actor in a Musical	Levi Meerovitch	Won
2018	Richmond Theatre Critics Circle Award	Best Sound Design - Musical	Ryan Dygert	Nominated
2018	Richmond Theatre Critics Circle Award	Best Set Design - Musical	Tennessee Dixon	Nominated
2018	Richmond Theatre Critics Circle Award	Best Costume Design- Musical	Leslie Cook-Day	Nominated
2018	Richmond Theatre Critics Circle Award	Best Lighting Design- Musical	Christian Detres	Nominated
2018	Richmond Theatre Critics Circle Award	Best Ensemble	Company	Nominated

== Recordings ==
A cast album of the original Lincoln Center production was released on January 19, 2016, by Ghostlight Records.
