= Three Houses =

Three Houses can refer to

- Three Houses (musical), 2024 chamber musical
- Three Houses, Barbados
- Fire Emblem: Three Houses, a 2019 video game
