= Perfect Harmony (musical) =

2006 musical comedy by Andrew Grosso

- Off-Broadway poster for Perfect Harmony
- Music: Various artists
- Lyrics: Various artists
- Book: Andrew Grosso & The Essentials
- Productions: 2005 Studio Tisch at NYU; 2006 FringeNYC / Fringe Encore; 2008 Off-Off Broadway; 2010 Stoneham, Massachusetts; 2010 Off-Broadway

Perfect Harmony is an a cappella musical comedy by Andrew Grosso and The Essentials for Perfect Harmony. A cappella vocal arrangements for Perfect Harmony are by Adam Wachter, with additional arrangements by Ray Bailey and Jeremy Gussin. Bailey and Wachter provided arrangements for the Off-Broadway production. The work premiered at the 2006 New York International Fringe Festival where it had an extended run in the Fringe Encore Series before it opened Off-Off Broadway in 2008. Its Off-Broadway introduction came in an October 2010 opening. The licensing agent for the play is the Samuel French Company

The plot follows the current school year of the greatest a cappella group in high school history: the eighteen-time U.S. national champions (and fictional) Acafellas. The comedy explores their relationship to the group's classmates, female counterparts, and perennial runners up: The Ladies in Red.

== Inception and productions ==
Perfect Harmony was written by Andrew Grosso and developed along with The Essentials. Originally created as a workshop at the NYU Graduate Acting Studio Tisch program, Perfect Harmony premiered at FringeNYC (New York International Fringe Festival) in 2006, had an extended run at the Fringe Encore Series, and in 2008 played Off-Off Broadway at the Clurman Theatre. Perfect Harmony made its Off-Broadway debut at Theatre Row's Acorn Theatre in October 2010 after a preview period at the Theatres at 45 Bleecker Street and an out-of-town run at the Stoneham Theatre, in Stoneham, Massachusetts. The Off-Broadway production was directed by Grosso and co-produced by celebrity reporter and nightlife personality Michael Musto.

The licensing agent for performances of Perfect Harmony is Samuel French In December 2018, Concord Music acquired Samuel French Inc., forming the theatrical licensing conglomerate Concord Theatricals.

=== The Essentials ===
Members of The Essentials for Perfect Harmony have included David Barlow, Jeffrey Binder, Drew Cortese, Meg DeFoe, Autumn Dornfeld, Alec Duffy, Cameron Folmar, Santino Fontana, Jordan Gelber, Scott Janes, Nicole Lowrance, Vayu O'Donnell, Thomas Piper, Maria Elena Ramirez, Jeanine Serralles, Margie Stokley, Marina Squerciati, Noah Weisberg, Margot White, Blake Whyte, and Marshall York.

== Plot synopsis ==
=== Scenes 1-5 ===
The first day of the school year begins, with the singing of the "Alma Mater" by the school's two a cappella groups: the world-famous, all male, Acafellas and their perennially overshadowed classmates, the all female, Ladies in Red. Applauding them as he addresses the assembly, Dr. Mergh, the high school psychologist, cautions that while he feels the community should recognize the tremendous accomplishments of these champion boy singers—and that "the girls try hard too, of course"—he is concerned about the pressure of tight harmony singing and worries that a cappella is a cult that this year will finally be "claiming its victims".

The Acafellas (Philip, Lassiter, Jasper, and JB) sing "Get Ready" to demonstrate to all the auditioning freshmen exactly how it is done. In the audience, Simon Depardieu is fighting nervousness since he is a bit of a late bloomer, even for a freshman. His nerves only get worse when he hears that Lassiter, the Acafellas' pitch, is looking for a talented musician who knows how to blend, JB is hoping for a cool dude, and Philip wants a guy who will not screw up their championship vibe. Simon knows he does not exactly check those boxes. He gives a powerful but highly unorthodox audition with "Three Times A Lady".

Meanwhile, the Ladies in Red (Melody, Meghan, Mickey, Valerie, and their student manager Kerri) are already in a crisis. Valerie apologizes for abandoning the group at nationals the previous year by locking herself in the janitor's closet so she would not have to be looked at, and promises she will be there this year. Meghan challenges Melody's decision to keep singing the same old songs, especially "My Life Flows On In Endless Song, How Can I Keep From Singing?." Melody co-opts the insubordination, for now, by making Meghan their new soloist, and changing the name of the group to Lady Treble.

On Tap Day, the Acafellas arrive to induct Simon into the group, although he is confused by their song, "Mony Mony". But as the Acafellas' singing progresses, he understands and then joyfully joins in. The group is complete. However, the plans for both groups are thrown awry when they learn that this year's nationals will be held at their high school and will be televised live on MTV 3.

=== Scenes 5-10 ===
Meghan and Mickey decide that the MTV 3 exposure necessitates new choreography and demonstrate "What I Like About You", but Melody worries that it is perhaps a little "loose" and she performs a more ladylike version.

Lassiter worries that the announcement "...is a setback ... All anyone can think about is what color cummerbunds they should wear when they hoist the trophy on MTV 3..." He resolves to teach the guys to stop focusing on winning and start focusing on musical truth. He teaches the group a new song, "Back on the Chain Gang", and wants them to "...forget about the words ... just sing from your inside; what you'd say if you were on a chain gang..." But the Acafellas are resistant to his methods. A standoff ensues that is only resolved when Philip admits that the guys are nervous that they'll embarrass themselves. Lassiter promises that the Acafellas will win nationals and Philip promises that the group will follow Lassiter.

On a quiet corner on campus, Meghan tries to help Valerie learn to be looked at. Valerie suggests that Meghan date Jasper but Meghan objects vehemently saying "...No, he's Melody's boyfriend. We can't even talk about talking about that..." She then suggests that Valerie and Simon could get together and practice their perfect pitch.

=== Scenes 11-16 ===
At the Christmas Concert the Acafellas suffer a humiliatingly disastrous performance, and so the boys vote to abandon Lassiter's new method. In a huff, Lassiter relinquishes the pitchpipe, stunning the group and walking away from his best friend, Philip.

The girls sound great behind their new soloist, Meghan. They are all delighted that Melody's new plan is working, but mentions that Meghan has some room for improvement—specifically, her dancing is a distraction. Determined to do better, Meghan tries to practice singing without dancing with "My Life Flows On In Endless Song", but it is no use; she sounds better when she moves. Frustrated, she cheers herself up by singing her favorite song, "Do You Love Me (Now That I Can Dance)". Walking past the room, Jasper overhears and joins her. Initially startled, Meghan sings back and they duet—until Melody overhears and catches them. She grabs Jaspers hand, insults Meghan, and leaves her alone to ponder what she has done.

A month later, the Acafellas are trying to adjust to life without Lassiter. JB has convinced them to let him sing a solo, "Easy", only JB has turned it into a star turn slow jam. Watching JB sing, Kiki Tune, an unscrupulous talent agent, convinces JB to quit school and become a professional a cappella superstar. And so the Acafellas are forced to soldier on with only three singers. They try to sing "I Think We're Alone Now", but it is no use—Philip cannot hit the high notes and lashes out when Simon suggests they invite Lassiter to return.

=== Scenes 17-18 ===
Lassiter tries his hand at composing but cannot find inspiration. Philip continues to practice his new part by himself. Simon, having just lost his idol JB, sings the duet they learned in happier times, "I Think I Love You." As he sings, his voice drifts through the vents to Lassiter in the library and Philip in the music room. Hypnotically they join in and all three trio on the song.

Still unable to sing high enough and with only a week left before regional finals, Philip visits the legendary voice whisperer, Toby McClintoch. She explains that his problem is not singing high enough, it is singing "inside enough". Philip is baffled until she counsels that nothing can cure his voice in a week, as "...only two things work instantly in this world: love and drugs".

=== Scenes 19-20 ===
At regionals Philip announces to the audience that the three remaining Acafellas are about to perform an arrangement normally sung by five voices. They sing "I Think We're Alone Now" and nail all five parts! Backstage, Meghan tries to apologize to Melody and explain that nothing happened with Jasper. Melody cuts her off and says that she would never let personal feelings interfere with Lady Treble. But when the girls go out on stage to perform and Meghan steps forward for her solo, Melody steals the spotlight and starts singing the solo instead. The two battle for control in "Goodbye to You."

=== Scenes 21-25 ===
Regional is over and the Acafellas have won first place, again. But when the Acafellas' collective urine sample tests positives for banned substances, the boys are forced to give back the winning trophy. Philip blames Simon and is about to kick him out of the group when JB returns. JB dismisses the drug test results saying, "...false positives happen all the time..." and announces that he left the professional a cappella world because he knew his friends were hurting and needed him to help get the group back together. He, Jasper, and Simon force Lassiter and Philip to finally confront each other and tell each other how they truly feel. Later that afternoon, Valerie confides to Simon how nervous she is about being looked at by the audiences at nationals and on MTV 3. Simon suggests she find something that covers her, like a wet suit.

=== Nationals ===
The Acafellas strut on stage singing The Jackson Five's "I Want You Back". They sound fantastic, but Philip stops the song and confesses publicly that he is actually the reason that the boys failed their drug test at regionals; he used his stepmother's home botox kit to help him hit the high notes. He apologizes to Lassiter, Simon, and all the guys and walks off stage saying they can still win without him. Just as he is about to exit the auditorium, Simon calls out to him and begins singing "I Want You Back". Going into the audience, Simon brings Philip back to the group and the boys insist he sing with them. Acknowledging finally that "...it's not about winning", Philip jumps back on stage and joins them. Now complete, the Acafellas sound amazing.

Meanwhile, backstage, Valerie has disappeared again despite her promises. In a panic, Melody insists that their student manager Kerri sing Valerie's part, commanding her to "...not let this be a disaster." As the applause for the boys dies down, Lady Treble enters the stage and they sing their old standby, "My Life Flows On In Endless Song." Valerie finally enters, but something goes terribly awry, and she knocks down all the girls except Kerri. She is terrified, but refuses to let it be a disaster, and slowly starts singing. Gathering strength with every note, she unleashes a powerful and passionate voice that blows the roof off! Moved by the force of Kerri's performance, the girls of Lady Treble get up and join her, and they have never sounded better.

=== Finale ===
As the two groups recover from performances at nationals that were nothing like they expected, Valerie and Simon compose a new arrangement to commemorate the year, a song about joy—the joy of being in the sound. The two groups join to sing Pat Benatar's "We Belong" and everyone takes a solo line. 'For worse or for better, they belong, they belong together.'

== Principal roles and casts ==
Philip Fellowes V – High School Senior. A third generation Acafella, he is slightly stuffy, somewhat pompous, but also has a strong sense of inherent decency. He is Lassiter's best friend, though they cannot speak to each other directly. Generally supportive of the group and other members, he desperately wants to win nationals at all costs. He begins to crack, crumbling under the pressure he has placed on himself and the group.

Lassiter A. Jayson III – High School Senior. Pitchpipe of the Acafellas, he considers himself an artist; intensely searching for "truth" in his art, his friendships, and himself. Passionate about artistic purity, he worries the group is too obsessed with winning. Lassiter takes himself very seriously.

Jasper Mergh – High School Junior. He is handsome, charismatic, and something of a school heartthrob. Although not mute, he doesn't speak, but has a stunning singing voice. He has dated Melody since freshman year. He is good-hearted, and just wants to sing and share his song.

JB Smooter – High School Senior and jock. He is a quarterback turned singer. Women swoon for him, and dudes want to be him. After he discovered a cappella, he just wants to sing with the guys. Viewed by some as not particularly bright, he is a good guy and positive influence on the others in the group.

Simon Depardieu – High School Freshman. Not yet an Acafella at the start of the play, he has dreamed of making the group and practices his song for his mom every night, and just hopes his canker sores and occasional bouts of lockjaw do not interfere with his audition. He is kind and gentle, and has a crush on Valerie.

Melody McDaniels – High School Senior. Both pitch and president of the Ladies in Red. She is pretty, but doesn't expect all the girls in the group to be pretty too. Talented, preternaturally poised, and ferociously hardworking; she wishes just once someone would give The Ladies in Red the proper credit they've worked so hard for. She and Jasper are dating, but her focus is on the group's work.

Michaela Dhiardeaubovic / "Mickey D" -–High School Sophomore. She is very happy to be in the group, even if she has to keep her participation a secret from her brother. She loves the girls, and loves singing, although she has a little trouble remembering the right words in English. She thinks that sometimes the other girls in the group are too uptight. She is from Herzegovina.

Valerie Smooter – High School Sophomore. It's fair to say she doesn't love performing, but she is determined not to repeat the previous year's debacle at regionals where she panicked and locked herself in the janitor's closet. She is witty and has a cutting sense of humor. Her older brother is the school's resident hunk, JB.

Meghan Beans – High School Junior. Pretty, busty, and a bit rambunctious. She is greatly misunderstood, and doesn't know why people are propagating rumors about her behavior. Really wishes the group could do more dancing and would have flashier costumes. She has always wanted a solo. She believes that Jesus is the only one who understands her, but maybe Jasper would too, if she could just get to know him better. To her, singing is less about the right pitch, and more about how you express yourself.

Kerri Taylor – High School Sophomore. She is the student manager of the Ladies in Red. She would sing but the potential for onstage embarrassment stops her. She loves being the manager, because it is an essential position to the team's success.

Dr. Larry Mergh – School psychologist. Kind-hearted, and feels that a cappella singing can be dangerous on a young mind.

Goran Dhiardeaubovic – Older brother, only living relative and legal guardian to Mickey D. Angry and controlling, but protective of family; he is ultimately harmless.

Kiki Tune – Brash talent agent. She is predatory and unabashed about it.

Tobi McClintock – World-famous vocal therapist. She is a "voice whisperer". Tobi is deeply empathetic, overly dramatic, and excited about curing youngsters of their self-inflicted vocal traumas.

=== Casts ===
Cast list of notable productions.

| Role | Off-Broadway / Stoneham, MA | Off-Off Broadway | FringeNYC | Studio Tisch |
|---|---|---|---|---|
| Melody McDaniels | Dana Acheson | Dana Acheson | Autumn Dornfeld | Autumn Dornfeld |
| Valerie Smooter | Faryl Amadeus | Margie Stokley | Margie Stokley | Margie Stokley |
| Jasper Mergh / Dr. Larry Mergh | Clayton Apgar | Clayton Apgar | Blake Whyte | Blake Whyte |
| Kerri Taylor / Tobi McClintoch | Marie-France Arcilla | Nisi Sturgis | Marina Squerciati | Marina Squerciati |
| Simon Depardieu / Goran Dhiardeubovic | David Barlow | Sean Dugan | David Barlow | David Barlow |
| Mickey D / Kiki Tune | Kate Morgan Chadwick | Kathy Searle | Jeanine Serralles | Jeanine Serralles |
| JB Smooter | Jarid Faubel | Scott Janes | Scott Janes | Scott Janes |
| Philip Fellowes V | Kobi Libii | Benjamin Huber | Noah Weissberg | Santino Fontana |
| Meghan Beans | Kelly McCreary | Amy Rutberg | Maria Elena Ramirez | Maria Elena Ramirez |
| Lassiter A. Jayson III | Robbie Collier Sublett | Vayu O'Donnell | Vayu O'Donnell | Jeff Binder |
| Understudy for the Ladies in Red | Tate Evans | Tate Evans | | |
| Understudy for the Acafellas | Marshall York | | | |

== Musical numbers ==
Perfect Harmony features a cappella arrangements of hit songs by The Jackson 5, Pat Benatar, Billy Idol, Marvin Gaye, Scandal, Tiffany, The Romantics, The Pretenders, Blue Swede, The Temptations, The Contours, The Commodores, Tommy James & the Shondells, B.J. Thomas and The Partridge Family.

- Alma Mater - The Company
- Get Ready - The Acafellas
- Three Times A Lady - Simon
- My Life Flows On (preprise) - The Ladies in Red
- Mony Mony - The Acafellas
- What I Like About You - Meghan and Mickey D
- What I Like About You (reprise) - Melody and Kerri
- Back On The Chain Gang - The Acafellas
- Do You Love Me - Meghan and Jasper
- Easy - The Acafellas
- I Think We're Alone Now (preprise) - The Acafellas
- I Think I Love You - The Acafellas
- I Think We're Alone Now - The Acafellas
- Goodbye To You - Lady Treble
- I Want You Back - The Acafellas
- My Life Flows On - Lady Treble
- Sexual Healing / Hooked On A Feeling - Meghan and Jasper
- We Belong - The Company

== Critical reception ==
Perfect Harmony received positive reviews when it premiered at the Harry de Jur Playhouse in New York City. Leonard Jacobs from Backstage stated that the musical was "...magnificently hilarious! The harmonies – typically absurd versions of pop songs – range from lovely to ridiculous to riotous..." and Talkin' Broadway found that "...Perfect Harmony tackles its spot-on satire with an unflinching seriousness that, by evening's end, becomes unbearably funny."

For the Off-Broadway debut at Theatre Row, the New York Post's Frank Scheck wrote "...it's hard to resist this musical comedy ... if you can't get enough of glee clubs and energetic vocals that soar, Perfect Harmony is the show for you." and Time Out New York said "...Glee addicts will find perfect pitch in this musical comedy about the most acclaimed singing club in the history of high school."

== Cultural effects and cast recording ==
Excerpts from Perfect Harmony are featured in Smith and Kraus' 2009 Best Stage Monologues and Scenes series for both men and women.

The Perfect Harmony soundtrack was recorded in January 2013, musically directed by Dave Malloy, and can be listened to online.
