= Sara Rosenbaum =

American lawyer

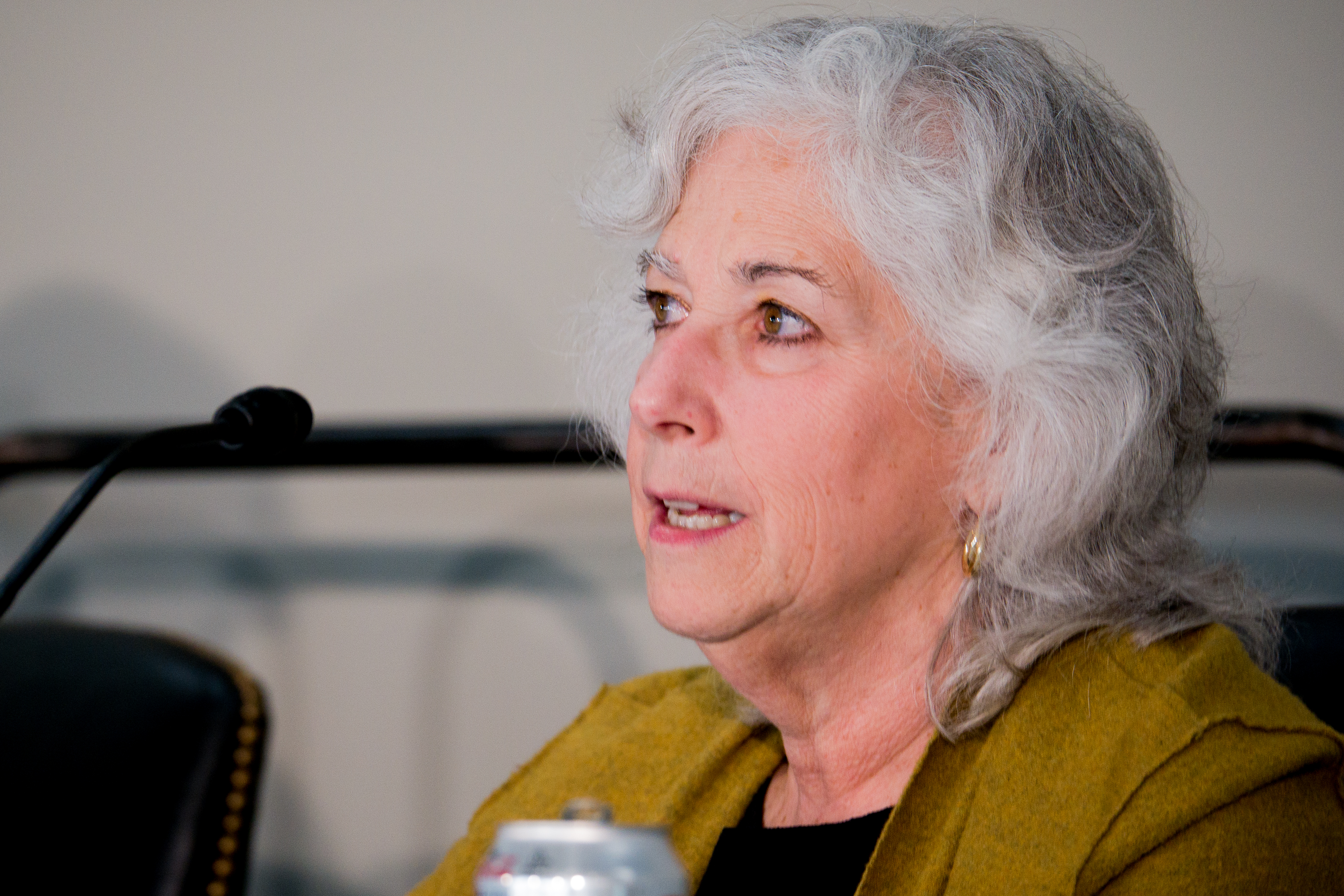
- Rosenbaum in 2017 speaking at the Alliance for Health Reform Briefing on Medicaid Moving Forward
- Born: New Haven, Connecticut, US
- Spouse(s): M. L. Lubin (m. 1970, divorced) David Chavkin
- Children: Rachel Chavkin

Academic background
- Education: BA, 1973, Wesleyan University; JD, 1976, Boston University School of Law

Academic work
- Institutions: Milken Institute School of Public Health; United States Domestic Policy Council

Sara Rosenbaum is an American lawyer. She is the Harold and Jane Hirsh Professor of Health Law and Policy and Founding Chair of the Department of Health Policy at George Washington University's Milken Institute School of Public Health.

== Early life and education ==
Rosenbaum grew up outside New Haven, Connecticut, to an educator father who taught at a private school. While enrolled at Milford High School, Rosenbaum was editor of the school paper which won the 1970 Columbia Scholastic Press Associations annual yearbook critique and contest. She graduated Cum Laude from Milford High School in 1970. Following her graduation, Rosenbaum married M. L. Lubin and enrolled at Wesleyan University for her Bachelor of Arts degree. Upon completing her undergraduate degree, Rosenbaum earned her Juris Doctor from Boston University School of Law.

== Career ==
After earning her Juris Doctor, Rosenbaum worked as a legal services attorney in Vermont and joined a legal services program based in California. In 1991, she accepted a professorship in George Washington University's (GWU) public health and management department but chose to take a two year leave to work with President Bill Clinton. In 1994, Rosenbaum began working for the Children's Defense Fund (CDF) under the Bill Clinton administration. While working for the CDF, she oversaw the drafting of the Health Security Act and the designing of the Vaccines for Children Program. During her time on Capitol Hill, Rosenbaum lobbied and frequently testified in front of Henry Waxman's subcommittee for the expansion of Medicaid benefits to children and women. After Clinton's team failed to pass a universal coverage health care system, Rosenbaum returned to GWU but kept her focus on studying Medicaid. As such, Rosenbaum received a grant from the Robert Wood Johnson Foundation for her project "Civil Rights and the American Health Care System: Conceptualizing a Law and Policy Framework in the New Health Environment for Title VI of the 1964 Civil Rights Act."

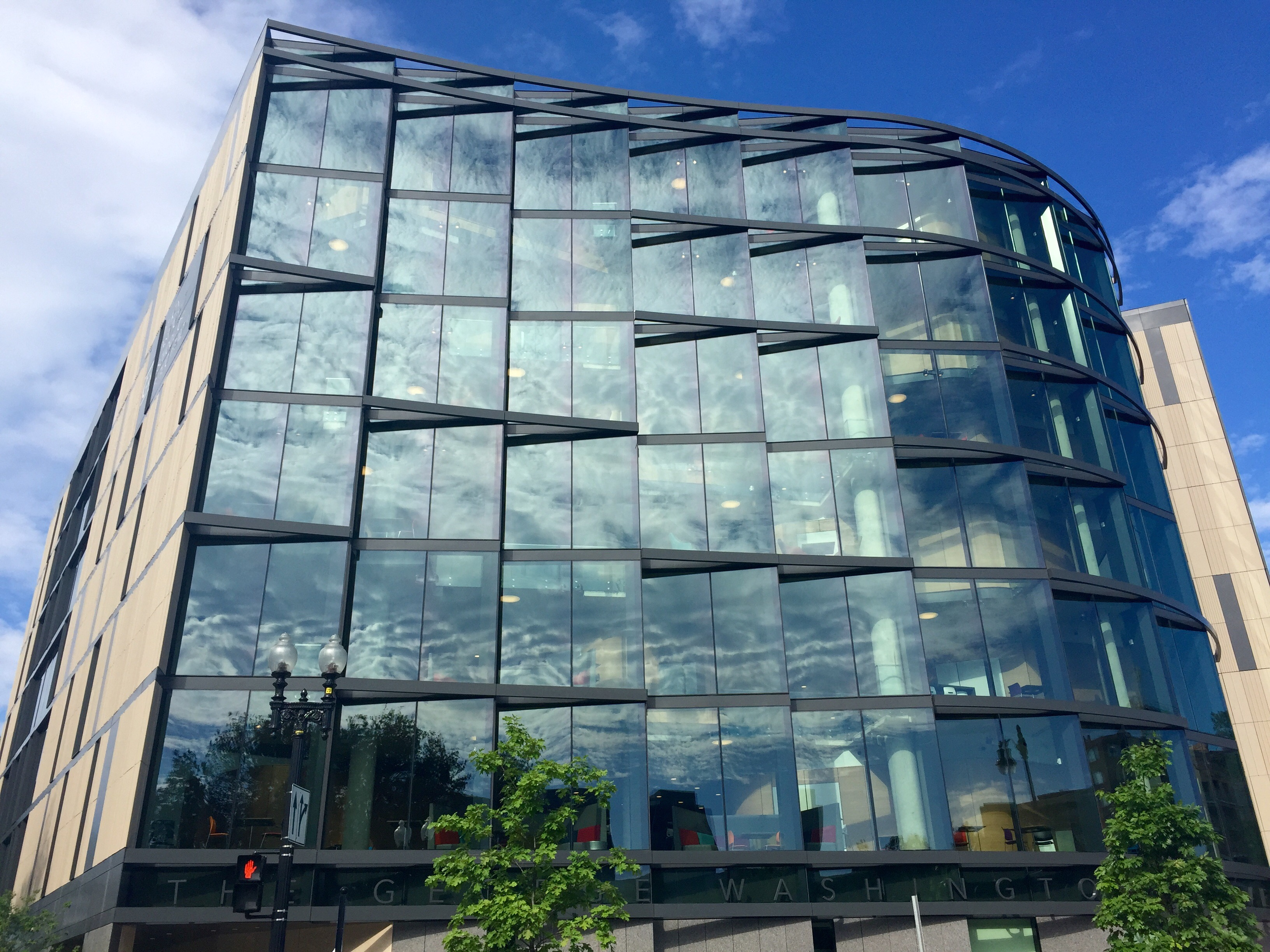
A photo of the Milken Institute School of Public Health.

By 2005, Rosenbaum was named one of America's 500 most influential health policymakers and was recognized by the United States Department of Health and Human Services for distinguished national service on behalf of Medicaid beneficiaries. In 2005, Rosenbaum was named the recipient of the Richard and Barbara Hansen Leadership Award and Distinguished Lectureship. A few years later, she was appointed to the Medicaid and CHIP Payment and Access Commission (MACPAC) by the Government Accountability Office. The commission aimed to review Medicaid and CHIP access and payment policies and advise Congress on issues affecting Medicaid and CHIP. In 2012, Rosenbaum and Paula Lantz became the first GWU colleagues to be elected to the Institute of Medicine (now referred to as the National Academy of Medicine) in the same year. Rosenbaum was elected for her work on the expansion of Medicaid, community health centers, patients’ rights in managed care, civil rights and health care, and national health reform. Rosenbaum's continued work with the MACPAC led her to be appointed chair of the commission in 2015.

In 2018, Rosenbaum was named one of the Top 10 most cited health law scholars based on citations in WestLaw’s Journal and Law Review database. Following this, Rosenbaum received a grant to develop strategies for using Medicaid managed care to strengthen access to family planning services. She was also recognized by the National Academy of Medicine for her outstanding service during the year of 2020. In 2022, Rosenbaum was named one of the "500 Most Influential People Shaping Policy" by the Washingtonian.

== Personal life ==
Rosenbaum is the mother of director Rachel Chavkin.
