= Gerald Jordan =

American businessman (born 1939)

Gerald R. Jordan Jr.
- Born: April 29, 1939 (age 87)
- Education: Harvard University
- Occupation: Businessman
- Employer(s): Hellman, Jordan Management
- Spouse: Darlene

Gerald Jordan (born April 29, 1939) is an American businessman.

== Personal life and political activities ==
Jordan has been married to Darlene Jordan since 1997; she is a former Massachusetts assistant attorney general. Jordan and his wife are major Republican donors, supporting Marco Rubio, Mitt Romney, and other Republican groups and candidates. The Jordans donated $400,000 to Mitt Romney's Restore Our Future in 2012.

== Career and education ==
Jordan graduated from Harvard College in 1961, concentrating in history, and earned an MBA from Harvard Business School in 1967.

Jordan began his investment career with Putnam Management Company. In 1978, Jordan founded Hellman, Jordan Management Co.

Jordan established the Gerald R. Jordan Jr. Foundation, which provides funding for graduates of Revere High School who attend Harvard. Jordan has also donated to the Boys & Girls Club and the United Way. He currently on the board of trustees for American Repertory Theater.
