= Dave Malloy =

American composer and actor (born 1976)

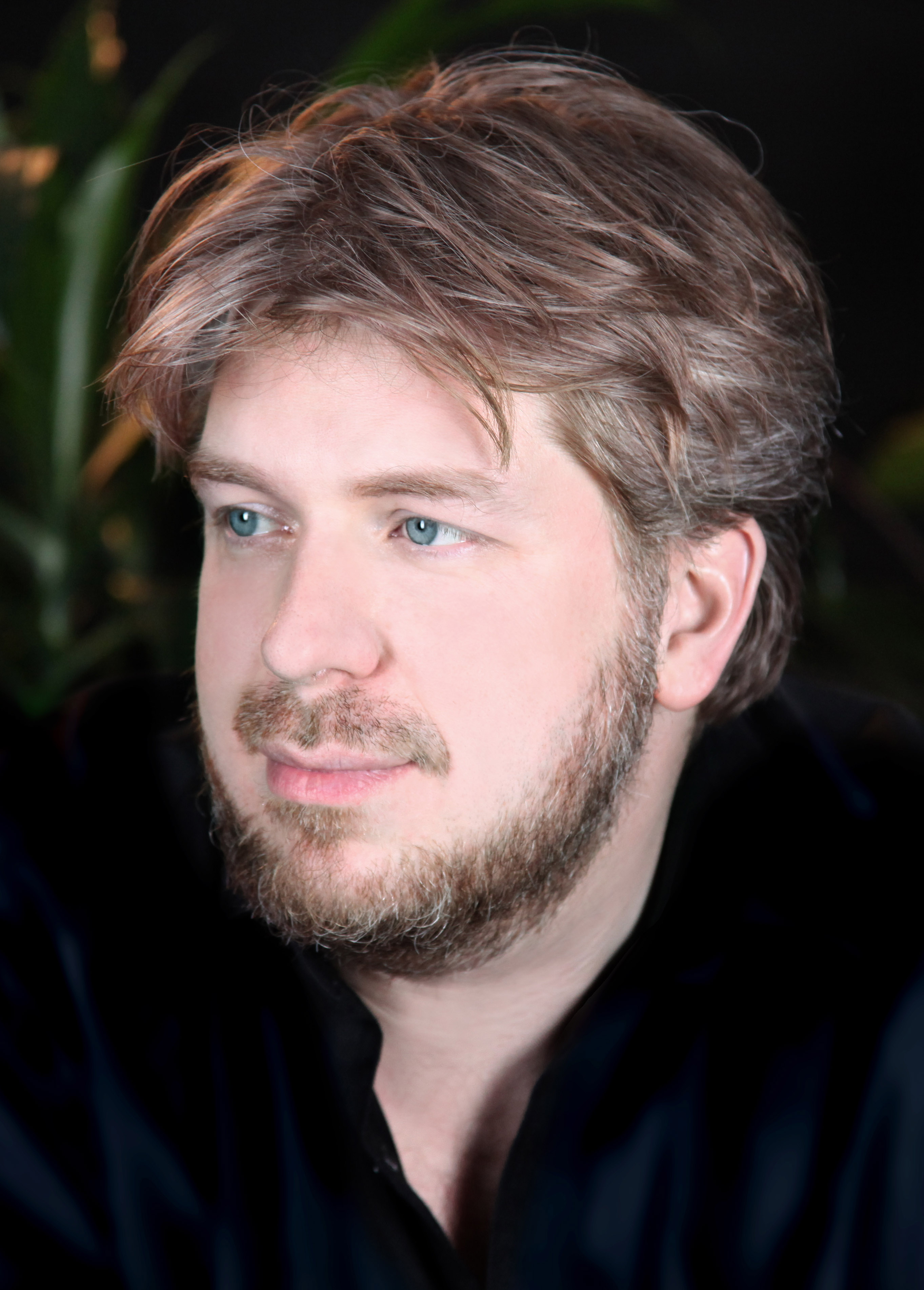
- Malloy in 2013
- Born: January 4, 1976 (age 50); Cleveland, Ohio, U.S.
- Education: Ohio University
- Occupations: Composer, playwright, lyricist, orchestrator, musician, actor, singer, sound designer
- Years active: 2000–present
- Known for: Natasha, Pierre & The Great Comet of 1812 (2012); Ghost Quartet (2014); Preludes (2015); Octet (2019)
- Spouse: Alaina Ferris

Dave Malloy (born January 4, 1976) is an American composer, playwright, lyricist, singer, orchestrator, and actor. He has written several theatrical works, often based on classic works of literature. His most well known work is the Tony Award winning Natasha, Pierre & The Great Comet of 1812, an electropop opera based on War and Peace. His other works include Ghost Quartet, a song cycle about "love, death, and whiskey"; Preludes, a musical fantasia set in the mind of romantic composer Sergei Rachmaninoff; Octet, a chamber choir musical about internet addiction; and Three Houses, a chamber musical about the COVID-19 pandemic.

== Career ==
Malloy grew up in Lakewood, Ohio and studied music composition and English literature at Ohio University. He began making theater in San Francisco in 2000. Early work included pieces with Banana Bag & Bodice, for whom he has been the composer since 2002.

In 2008 he composed music for Beowulf – A Thousand Years of Baggage, a Banana Bag & Bodice SongPlay written by Jason Craig and commissioned by the Shotgun Players in Berkeley, California. Beowulf received the 2008 Glickman Award and a 2011 Edinburgh Herald Angel, and has played a number of venues and festivals, including Berkeley Repertory's Roda Theatre, ART's Club Oberon, Joe's Pub, and festivals in England, Ireland, Scotland and Australia.

After Beowulf, he co-created and performed in Three Pianos, a drunken romp through Schubert's "Winterreise" (with Rick Burkhardt and Alec Duffy, directed by Rachel Chavkin) that premiered in 2010 at the Ontological-Hysteric Theater, winning a Special Citation Obie Award, and had runs at New York Theatre Workshop and American Repertory Theater.

His next work was Beardo, a Russian indie rock musical based on the life of Rasputin, which Malloy wrote with Beowulf collaborator Jason Craig. It played in 2011 in San Francisco and had its New York premiere in February 2017 in a production by Pipeline Theater Company.

For Natasha, Pierre & The Great Comet of 1812, Malloy was the composer, lyricist, orchestrator, music director and performer in the role of Pierre Bezukhov. Comet was commissioned by Ars Nova and premiered there in October 2012, directed by Chavkin; in May 2013 the show transferred to off-Broadway playing in Kazino, a tent custom-built for the piece, first erected in the Meatpacking District and then in Times Square. In December 2015 the show played a pre-Broadway run at the American Repertory Theater in Cambridge, Massachusetts. The show has won an Obie Award, the 2013 Richard Rodgers Award for Musical Theater, the Off Broadway Alliance's Best New Musical Award, three Elliot Norton Awards, eight IRNE Awards, eleven Lucille Lortel Awards nominations (winning three), five Drama Desk nominations, and two Drama League Award nominations.

Ghost Quartet opened in October 2014 at the Bushwick Starr. After an extended sold out run, the piece transferred to the McKittrick Hotel, home of Sleep No More, and has since played in a number of cities, including Edinburgh, San Francisco, and Cambridge, where it won an Elliot Norton Award. The piece is a staged concept album, about love, death, and whiskey. This was followed by a high school musical, Don't Stop Me, a "dance-a-thon to the death" with book and co-lyrics by Krista Knight, produced by Youth Musical Theatre Company in Berkeley CA, where he worked as musical director from 2006–09. While the show was in performances, his next musical, Preludes, a piece about Rachmaninoff and hypnosis, premiered at Lincoln Center Theater in June 2015.

Natasha, Pierre and the Great Comet of 1812 opened on Broadway at the Imperial Theatre in October 2016 with Josh Groban as Pierre. The show was nominated for twelve Tony Awards including Best Musical, Book, Score and Orchestration awards. Malloy reprised his role as Pierre multiple times throughout the run, and was the final Broadway Pierre. In 2022, the show was staged at Malloy's alma mater, Ohio University, the first American production since its departure from Broadway.

Octet, a chamber choir musical written by Malloy and directed by Annie Tippe, ran at the Signature Theatre Company Residency 5 Theatre in New York City from April 30 to June 30, 2019. The show features an eight-part a cappella chamber choir and "explores addiction and nihilism within the messy context of 21st century technology" premiered in a limited run at the Signature Theatre Company in New York City. It is the first part of his Signature Residency, which will include three shows over the course of five years.

Moby-Dick, a musical based on Herman Melville's Moby-Dick with book, music, lyrics, and orchestrations by Malloy and directed by Rachel Chavkin, ran at the American Repertory Theater from December 3, 2019, to January 12, 2020. The middle section of the show, titled Moby Dick, Part III: The Ballad of Pip was previewed at Joe's Pub back in March 2014.

In 2021, he had a cameo in Lin-Manuel Miranda’s film adaptation of Jonathan Larson’s stage musical, Tick, Tick... Boom!.

In September 2022 he wrote music and lyrics for Love Around the Block, a one night only musical event celebrating the opening of Hermés's new flagship store in NYC. In November 2023, his musical The Witches opened at London's Royal National Theatre. In May 2024, his new musical Three Houses opened at the Signature Theatre in NYC.

In April 2026, it was announced that Lin-Manuel Miranda would direct a film adaptation of Malloy’s Octet. Malloy is writing the screenplay and serving as executive producer. The cast includes Amanda Seyfried as Jessica, Rachel Zegler as Velma, Sheryl Lee Ralph as Paula, Phillipa Soo as Karly, Gaten Matarazzo as Toby, Jonathan Groff as Henry, Tramell Tillman as Marvin, and Paul-Jordan Jansen as Ed attached to star.

In May 2026 he will debut his new musical, Black Swan, at the American Repertory Theater, with music and lyrics by Malloy and a book by Jen Silverman. It is based on the 2010 film of the same name and will be directed by Sonya Tayeh.

Malloy lives in New York.

== Theater works ==
=== Musicals ===
- Gogol (2001) (composer/orchestrator/music director/performer; lyrics & book by Jason Craig and Sean Owens; directed by Meredith Eldred)
- Sandwich (2003) (co-creator, with Banana Bag & Bodice)
- Clown Bible (2007) (composer/lyricist/co-bookwriter/orchestrator/Job/Judas; co-written & directed by Maya Gurantz)
- Beowulf – A Thousand Years of Baggage (2008) (composer/orchestrator/musical director/Hrothgar; lyrics & book by Jason Craig; with Banana Bag & Bodice)
- Haarlem Berlin (2009) (composer/orchestrator; written by Talaya Delaney, directed by Rachel Chavkin)
- Three Pianos (2010) (co-creator/co-orchestrator/sound & video designer/performer; written & created with Rick Burkhardt and Alec Duffy, directed by Rachel Chavkin)
- Beardo (2011) (composer/orchestrator; lyrics & book by Jason Craig, directed by Patrick Dooley)
- Natasha, Pierre & The Great Comet of 1812 (2012) (composer/lyricist/bookwriter/orchestrator/Pierre; directed by Rachel Chavkin)
- Black Wizard / Blue Wizard (2013) (composer/co-lyricist/orchestrator/Black Wizard; book and co-lyrics by Eliza Bent, directed by Dan Safer)
- Ghost Quartet (2014) (composer/lyricist/bookwriter/orchestrator/Astronomer/Edgar/David; developed with Brent Arnold, Gelsey Bell and Brittain Ashford, directed by Annie Tippe)
- Preludes (2015) (composer/lyricist/bookwriter/orchestrator; directed by Rachel Chavkin)
- Don't Stop Me (2015) (composer/co-lyricist/orchestrator; book & co-lyrics by Krista Knight; directed by Jennifer Boesing)
- Little Bunny Foo Foo (2018) (composer/orchestrator; book & lyrics by Anne Washburn, directed by Les Waters)
- Octet (2019) (composer/lyricist/bookwriter/orchestrator; directed by Annie Tippe)
- Moby-Dick (2019) (composer/lyricist/bookwriter/orchestrator; directed by Rachel Chavkin)
- Love Around the Block (2022) (composer/lyricist/co-orchestrator; book by Isaac Oliver; co-orchestrations by Or Matias; directed by Jason Eagan. Commissioned by Hermés for the grand opening of their flagship store in NYC.)
- The Witches (2023) (composer/co-lyricist/orchestrator; book & co-lyrics by Lucy Kirkwood; directed by Lyndsey Turner)
- Three Houses (2024) (composer/lyricist/bookwriter/orchestrator; directed by Annie Tippe)
- Black Swan (2026) (composer/lyricist/orchestrator; book by Jen Silverman; directed by Sonya Tayeh)

=== Other theater works ===
- Gulag Ha Ha (2002) (composer/sound designer/Old Timer; with Banana Bag & Bodice)
- in3 (2003) (composer/performer; written by j. ries and Jason Craig; directed by Meredith Eldred)
- The Sewers (2005) (composer/sound designer; with Banana Bag & Bodice)
- Dysphoria (2007) (composer/sound designer; written & directed by Alec Duffy)
- Space//Space (2009) (composer/sound designer; with Banana Bag & Bodice)
- Five Days in March (2010) (composer; written by Toshiki Okada, directed by Dan Safer)
- The Small (2010) (composer/Walt) (written by Anne Washburn, directed by Les Waters)
- Murder in the Cathedral (2010) (composer; written by T.S. Eliot, directed by Alec Duffy)
- All Hands (2012) (composer/sound designer; written by Robert Quillen Camp, directed by Alec Duffy)
- LongYarn (2016) (composer/sound designer; with Banana Bag & Bodice)

=== Performance credits ===
Year	Title	Role	Notes
2001	Gogol	Performer	
2002	Gulag Ha Ha	Old Timer	
2007	Clown Bible	Job / Judas	
2008	Beowulf – A Thousand Years of Baggage	King Hrothgar	
2010	Three Pianos	Performer	
2010	The Small	Walt	
2010-2011	Three Pianos	Performer	Off-Broadway
2012-2013	Natasha, Pierre & The Great Comet of 1812	Pierre Bezukhov	Off-Broadway
2013-2014	Black Wizard / Blue Wizard	Black Wizard	Off-Off-Broadway
2014-2015	Ghost Quartet	The Astronomer / Edgar Usher / David / Subway Driver	Off-Broadway
2015	Ghost Quartet	The Astronomer / Edgar Usher / David / Subway Driver	American Repertory Theater
2015	Ghost Quartet	The Astronomer / Edgar Usher / David / Subway Driver	Curran Theatre
2016	Ghost Quartet	The Astronomer / Edgar Usher / David / Subway Driver	Summerhall
2017	Natasha, Pierre & The Great Comet of 1812	Pierre Bezukhov (Alternate)	Broadway
2017	Natasha, Pierre & The Great Comet of 1812	Pierre Bezukhov	Broadway
2017	Ghost Quartet	The Astronomer / Edgar Usher / David / Subway Driver	Off-Broadway
2018	Ghost Quartet	The Astronomer / Edgar Usher / David / Subway Driver	Seattle Theatre Group
2025	Ghost Quartet	The Astronomer / Edgar Usher / David / Subway Driver	Ten Year Anniversary Concert

== Recordings ==
In addition to the full cast recordings listed below, rough recordings and demos to most of Malloy's shows can be found on his website.

Official video recordings of Ghost Quartet, Beardo, and Beowulf have also been released online. A Kickstarter was launched to fund the original cast recording of Octet on June 19, 2019, where it was fully funded in one day. The album was released digitally on November 15, 2019.

== Honors and awards ==
He is the winner of three OBIE Awards, a Lucille Lortel Award, a Drama Desk Award, a Richard Rodgers Award, Glickman Award, ASCAP New Horizons Award, Jonathan Larson Grant, and New Music USA Grant, a recipient of the 2009 NEA/TCG Career Development Program for Theatre Directors and Designers, and the 2011 Composer-in-Residence at Ars Nova. In 2017, Malloy was the recipient of Smithsonian Magazine's American Ingenuity Award for History.

Year	Award	Category	Work	Result
2007	East Bay Express, Best of 2007	Best Music	Clown Bible	Won
2008	Glickman Award	Best New Play	Beowulf — A Thousand Years of Baggage	Won
2009	Innovative Theatre Award	Best Music	Beowulf — A Thousand Years of Baggage	Nominated
2010	Obie Award	Special Citations	Three Pianos	Won
2011	Henry Howes Design Award	Best Sound & Video Design	Three Pianos	Nominated
2011	Edinburgh Stage Award for Acting Excellence	Best Ensemble	Beowulf — A Thousand Years of Baggage	Won
2012	Richard Rodgers Award for Musical Theater		Beardo	Nominated
2013	Obie Award	Special Citations	Natasha, Pierre, & The Great Comet of 1812	Won
2013	Drama Desk Award	Outstanding Music	Natasha, Pierre, & The Great Comet of 1812	Nominated
2013	Drama Desk Award	Outstanding Lyrics	Natasha, Pierre, & The Great Comet of 1812	Nominated
2013	Drama Desk Award	Outstanding Musical	Natasha, Pierre, & The Great Comet of 1812	Nominated
2013	Drama League Award	Outstanding Musical	Natasha, Pierre, & The Great Comet of 1812	Nominated
2013	Richard Rodgers Award for Musical Theater		Natasha, Pierre, & The Great Comet of 1812	Won
2013	ASCAP Foundation Richard Rodgers New Horizons Award		Natasha, Pierre, & The Great Comet of 1812	Won
2013	Off-Broadway Alliance Awards	Best New Musical	Natasha, Pierre, & The Great Comet of 1812	Won
2013	Lucille Lortel Award	Outstanding Musical	Natasha, Pierre, & The Great Comet of 1812	Nominated
2015	Drama Desk Award	Outstanding Music	Ghost Quartet	Nominated
2015	Drama League Award	Outstanding Musical	Ghost Quartet	Nominated
2015	Off-Broadway Alliance Awards	Best Unique Theatrical Experience	Ghost Quartet	Nominated
2016	Elliot Norton Award	Outstanding Visiting Production	Ghost Quartet	Won
2017	Tony Award	Best Book of a Musical	Natasha, Pierre, & The Great Comet of 1812	Nominated
2017	Tony Award	Best Original Score	Natasha, Pierre, & The Great Comet of 1812	Nominated
2017	Tony Award	Best Orchestrations	Natasha, Pierre, & The Great Comet of 1812	Nominated
2017	Tony Award	Best Musical	Natasha, Pierre, & The Great Comet of 1812	Nominated
2017	Theatre World Award		Natasha, Pierre, & The Great Comet of 1812	Honoree
2017	Drama Desk Award	Outstanding Music	Beardo	Nominated
2020	Lucille Lortel Awards	Outstanding Musical	Octet	Won
2020	Drama Desk Awards	Outstanding Musical	Octet	Nominated
2020	Drama Desk Awards	Outstanding Music	Octet	Won
2020	Drama Desk Awards	Outstanding Lyrics	Octet	Nominated
2020	Drama Desk Awards	Outstanding Book of a Musical	Octet	Nominated
2020	Drama Desk Awards	Outstanding Orchestrations	Octet	Nominated
2020	Drama League Awards	Outstanding Production of a Musical	Octet	Nominated
2020	Outer Critics Circle Award	Outstanding New Off-Broadway Musical	Octet	Honoree
2020	Outer Critics Circle Award	Outstanding New Score	Octet	Honoree
2020	Obie Award	Collaboration on Music & Sound	Octet	Won
2025	Lucille Lortel Awards	Outstanding Musical	Three Houses	Won
2025	Laurence Olivier Awards	Best New Musical	Natasha, Pierre, & The Great Comet of 1812	Nominated
2025	Laurence Olivier Awards	Outstanding Musical Contribution	Natasha, Pierre, & The Great Comet of 1812	Nominated
