= Moby-Dick (2019 musical) =

2019 stage musical

- Playbill for the Cambridge production
- Music: Dave Malloy
- Lyrics: Dave Malloy
- Book: Dave Malloy
- Basis: Moby-Dick by Herman Melville
- Productions: 2014 "The Ballad of Pip" at Joe's Pub; 2019 American Museum of Natural History; 2019 Cambridge

Moby-Dick is a musical in four parts with lyrics, music and book by Dave Malloy. An adaptation of the classic 1851 novel by Herman Melville, the musical made its world premiere in December 2019 at the American Repertory Theater in Cambridge, Massachusetts, directed by Rachel Chavkin.

== Production history ==
Part III: "The Ballad of Pip" was performed as a standalone jazz song-cycle at Joe's Pub on March 20, 2014.

On July 26, 2019, and July 27, 2019, a 90-minute concert of excerpts from Moby-Dick was performed at the American Museum of Natural History, in the Milstein Hall of Ocean Life underneath the whale.

The musical had its world premiere at the American Repertory Theater in Cambridge, Massachusetts on December 11, 2019, after one week of previews.

== Musical numbers ==
Prologue

- The Sermon – Mapple
- Etymology – Ishmael

Part I "The Doubloon"

- "Loomings" – Ishmael, Company
- "Knights & Squires" – Ishmael, Company

i. Knights & Squires (I)
ii. Knights & Squires (II)
iii. Isolatoes

- "A Bosom Friend" – Ishmael, Queequeg, Company
- "Ahab" – Company
- "The Quarter-Deck" – Ahab, Starbuck, Company
- {Whalesong Interlude (I)}/The Albatross – Daggoo, Pip
- Sunset – Ahab, Company

Part II "The Honour and Glory of Whaling"

- Cetology – Ishmael, Company
- Stubb Kills a Whale – Company
- Fedallah – Fedallah
- The Whale as a Dish/Cutting In – Stubb, Company
- A Squeeze of the Hand – Company
- The Pequod Meets the Bachelor – Boomer, Sailors
- The Try-Works – Ishmael, Fedallah, Company
- {Whalesong Interlude (II)} – Tashtego
- The Cabin – Ahab, Starbuck
- Dusk - Starbuck, Company

Part III "The Ballad of Pip; or, The Castaway"

- Pip – Ishmael
- Tambourine – Elijah, Company
- Shanty – Shanty Singer, Company
- Ocean – Mapple, Company
- Coda – Ahab, Pip

Part IV "The American Hearse"

- The Pacific – Queequeg, Ishmael
- Sextet – Company
- The Pequod Meets the Rachel – Gardiner, Company
- The Symphony – Company
- The Chase – Company

i. First Day
ii. Second Day
iii. Third Day

- Roll On {Whalesong Interlude (III)} – Tashtego, Daggoo, Company

Epilogue

== Cast ==
Character	Original Cambridge Cast (2019)
Ishmael	Manik Choksi
Captain Ahab	Tom Nelis
Father Mapple/Captain of the Albatross/Captain Boomer of the Bachelor/Captain Gardiner of the Rachel	Dawn L. Troupe
Queequeg	Andrew Cristi
Fedallah	Eric Berryman
Starbuck	Starr Busby
Stubb	Kalyn West
Flask	Anna Ishida
Tashtego	Matt Kizer
Daggoo	J.D. Mollison
Pip	Morgan Siobhan Green
Sailor 1/The Blacksmith	Ashkon Davaran
Sailor 2/The Carpenter	Kim Blanck

== Reception ==
The Cambridge production was generally well reviewed, with praise for the music and the work of scenic designer Mimi Lien in particular, while common criticisms included the 3 1/2-hour length and "The Ballad of Pip" section. Don Aucoin of the Boston Globe wrote that it was "ambitiously conceived and superbly executed ... if occasionally self-indulgent," while Carolyn Clay of WBUR's ARTery called it "an extraordinary sum of diverse parts." On the other hand, Christopher Caggiano of The Arts Fuse criticized the production for trying to adapt the entire book, and for "forcing" contemporary parallels.
