= Eliza Bent =

American playwright, performer, and journalist

- Born: May 30, 1982 (age 44); Brookline, Massachusetts
- Education: Boston College; Brooklyn College
- Occupations: Writer, performer, journalist, stand up comedian
- Website: Official website

Eliza Bent (born May 30, 1982) is an American playwright, performer, and journalist. Her plays have been staged off-broadway at theaters across New York City including: Abrons Art Center, A.R.T., New York Theatre Workshop (Next Door), The Bushwick Starr, and others. She is a founding member of the Brooklyn-based Half Straddle theater company and a graduate of the Brooklyn College MFA program in playwriting. Bent currently teaches in the department of Radio/Television/Film at Northwestern.

== Early life and education ==
Bent was born and raised in Brookline, Massachusetts in 1982. As a child, she was interested in penguins, the post office, and airline logistics. She earned a degree in philosophy at Boston College. While studying there, she performed in shows at the Massachusetts Institute of Technology. Later, she received an MFA in playwriting at Brooklyn College.

== Produced plays ==
- Bonnie's Last Flight (New York Theatre Workshop Next Door, 2019)
- Indeed, Friend! (Clubbed Thumb, workshop production, 2018)
- Aloha, Aloha, or When I Was Queen (Abrons Arts Center commission 2018))
- Real Talk / Kip Talk (Abrons Arts Center commission 2016/17))
- On a Clear Day I Can See to Elba (Atlantic Theater Amplified Series, 2017; New Ohio’s ICE Factory, 2016)
- Toilet Fire (Abrons Arts Center, 2015; JACK, 2015; The Brick, 2016)
- The Beyonce (Breaking String Theatre 2014; Adjusted Realists, 2018)
- Asleep at the Wheel (workshop production, Brooklyn College, 2015)
- Blue Wizard / Black Wizard (Incubator Arts Project, 2013; Other Forces, 2014)
- The Hotel Colors (The Bushwick Starr, 2013)
- Karma Kharms (or Yarns by Kharms) (Target Margin Lab at The Bushwick Starr, 2012)
- Pen Pals Meet (Iranian Theatre Festival at The Brick, 2011)

== Residencies ==
- LMCC Workspace 2018/19
- Berkeley Rep's Ground Floor 2018
- SPACE on Ryder Farm 2017 / Working Farm 2016
- Target Margin Institute Fellow 2016
- Casa Zia Lina 2014
- MacDowell Colony 2013
