= Mimi Lien =

American set designer (born 1976)

- Born: 1976 (age 49–50)
- Education: Yale University (BA); New York University (MFA)
- Occupation: Set designer
- Years active: 2003–present
- Awards: Tony Award for Best Scenic Design of a Musical; MacArthur Fellowship
- Website: www.mimilien.com/work

Mimi Lien (born 1976) is a Chinese American set designer, best known for the scenic design of Natasha, Pierre & The Great Comet of 1812. In 2017, she received a Tony Award for her work with the Broadway production. Lien is also a 2015 recipient of a MacArthur Fellowship.

== Early life and education ==
Lien is from New Haven, Connecticut.

Lien graduated from Yale University in 1997, and she then attended New York University, where she earned her MFA in design from Tisch School of the Arts in 2003.

== Career ==
Much of Lien's education is centered around architecture, which contributes to the large scale of her set designs. She has designed over 100 shows, operas, and installations, including two Broadway premieres. Lien is currently teaching as an adjunct professor in Set Design at NYU Tisch.

== Personal life ==
Lien is married to writer and director Alec Duffy. Together, Lien and Duffy are co-founders of JACK, a performing arts space in Clinton Hill, Brooklyn.

== Theater ==
- An Octoroon (2015)
- Preludes (2015)
- The Long Walk Opera (2015)
- John (2015)
- Memory Palace (2015)
- Lost in the Meadow (2015)
- War (2016)
- A 24-Decade History of Popular Music (2016)
- Natasha, Pierre & The Great Comet of 1812 (2016)
- Pelleas et Melisande (2017)
- Four Nights of Dream (2017)
- A Period of Animate Existence (2017)
- Memoirs of a Unicorn
- Fairview (2018)
- Lifespan of a Fact (2018)
- True West (2018)
- Die Zauberflöte (2019)
- The Secret Life of Bees (2019)
- Fairview (2019)
- Superterranean (2019)
- The Thin Place (2019)
- Moby-Dick (2019)
- Help (2020)
- Love Unpunished (2021)
- Suffragist (2022)
- Sweeney Todd: The Demon Barber of Fleet Street (2023)
- Marks of RED (2026) – scenic design for Shamel Pitts | TRIBE; a large-scale immersive environment commissioned by the Walker Art Center and Northrop at the University of Minnesota, conceived as an enveloping "womb space" realized in red stretch fabric.

== Awards and nominations ==
Year	Award	Category	Work	Result
2014	Lucille Lortel Award	Outstanding Scenic Design	Natasha, Pierre & The Great Comet of 1812	Won
2015	MacArthur Fellowship			Won
2016	Obie Award	Special Citation for Collaboration	John by Annie Baker	Won
2017	Tony Award	Best Scenic Design in a Musical	Natasha, Pierre & The Great Comet of 1812	Won
2017	Drama Desk Award	Outstanding Set Design	Natasha, Pierre & The Great Comet of 1812	Won
2017	Outer Critics Circle Award	Outstanding Set Design	Natasha, Pierre & The Great Comet of 1812	Won
2017	Lucille Lortel Award	Outstanding Scenic Design	Signature Plays	Nominated
2017	Bessie Awards	Outstanding Visual Design	A 24-Decade History of Popular Music by Taylor Mac	Won
2018	Bessie Awards	Outstanding Visual Design	Memoirs of a ... Unicorn	Won
2019	Drama Desk Award	Outstanding Set Design	Fairview	Nominated
2023	Tony Award	Best Scenic Design in a Musical	Sweeney Todd: The Demon Barber of Fleet Street	Nominated

== See also ==
- Chinese people in New York City
