= Three Houses (musical) =

Chamber musical

- Music: Dave Malloy
- Lyrics: Dave Malloy
- Book: Dave Malloy
- Productions: 2024 Signature Theatre Company

Three Houses is a chamber musical with music, lyrics, book, and orchestrations by Dave Malloy, and direction and choreography by Annie Tippe.

== Synopsis ==
Susan has fled to Latvia. Sadie hides in New Mexico. Beckett longs for Ireland. All three are alone; all three are haunted by their grandparents; all three hear the Big Bad Wolf scratching at the door. Three Houses is a post-pandemic open mic night parable about magic, madness, and the end of the world.

== Musical numbers ==
First House: Susan

- intro (i)
- i. birch trees
- ii. the library
- iii. weed and wine
- iv. happy/crazy
- v. the manuscript
- vi. the berries and the plums
- vii. blood

Second House: Sadie

- intro (ii)
- i. desert
- ii. the village
- iii. dating
- iv. karaoke night
- v. too soon
- vi. quarters
- vii. haze

Third House: Beckett

- intro (iii)
- i. new life
- ii. boxes
- iii. stones
- iv. love always leaves you in the end
- v. the visitor
- vi. the summoning
- vii. wolf dance

Coda

== Productions ==
The piece premiered on May 20, 2024, Off-Broadway at the Signature Theatre in New York City.

The production was Directed & Choreographed by Annie Tippe, with Music Supervision & Music Direction by Or Matias, Scenic Design by dots, Costume Design by Haydee Zelideth, Lighting Design by Christopher Bowser, Sound Design by Nick Kourtides, Puppet Design by James Ortiz, and Production Stage Management by Elizabeth Emanuel.

== Roles and principal casts ==
Character	Actor
Susan/Shelob	Margo Seibert
Sadie/Pookie	Mia Pak
Beckett/Zippy	J.D. Mollison
Grandmother	Ching Valdes-Aran
Grandfather	Henry Stram
Wolf	Scott Stangland
Conductor/Piano/Organ	Mona Seyed-Bolorforosh
Violin	Yuko Naito-Gotay
French Horn	Blair Hamrick
Cello	Maria Bella Jeffers

== Critical response ==
Critical response was positive to mixed; Jesse Green of the New York Times saying "Malloy's music remains as hypnotic and embracing as ever"; David Gordon of Theatermania calling it "perhaps the most societally noteworthy new musical to come out of the post-Covid era". Tony Marnelli of Theatrescene.net stated "Malloy always has a clear vision. Tackling the book, music, lyrics and orchestrations for a piece with so much message to it is daunting, yet Malloy's masterwork is a triumph in that it touches us so deeply as it entertains."

== Recording ==
A cast album was released on Bandcamp on February 9, 2025.
