= Daniel Fish =

American theatre director

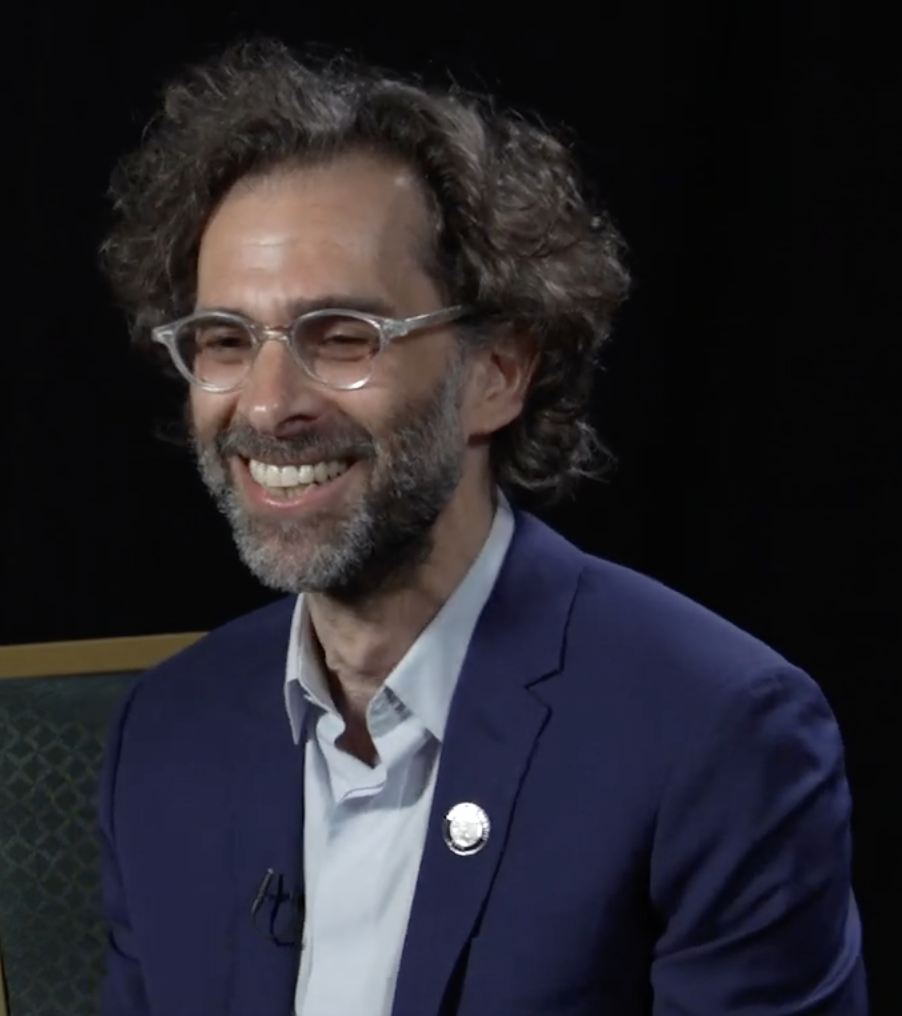
Fish in 2019.

Daniel Fish is an American theater director based in New York City.

== Early career ==
Daniel Fish graduated from Northwestern University with a BS in performance studies. From 1989 to 1993 he worked as the assistant director to Michael Kahn at the Shakespeare Theatre Company. Following this, he freelanced, directing conceptually experimental productions of Molière and Shakespeare, including iconoclastic productions of Twelfth Night at The Shakespeare Theatre, Romeo and Juliet at Great Lakes Theater Festival, and Tartuffe for the Court Theatre.

== Later work ==
In 2002, Fish's production of Charles Mee's True Love opened in New York City at a former zipper factory. The New York Times hailed Fish's work as "the most inventive directorial effort of the year." He continued to direct Shakespeare and Molière including controversial productions of Tartuffe and Hamlet for the McCarter Theatre and Merchant of Venice for California Shakespeare Theatre. During this time, he began branching out into new work, directing productions of David Rabe's The Black Monk for Yale Repertory Theatre, Poor Beck for the Royal Shakespeare Company, and Charles Mee's Paradise Park for Signature Theatre Company.

In Germany, he has directed Sheila Callaghan's We Are Not These Hands for the Düsseldorfer Schauspielhouse and a production of Der Menschenfiend for Staatstheater Braunschweig.

In 2006, Fish directed an acclaimed production of Clifford Odets' Rocket to the Moon, which premiered at Bard SummerScape and went on to Long Wharf Theatre. The New York Times called the production, "heartfelt, freshly conceived and rich in moments that illuminate the tenderness of Odets's vision..."

He directed another Odets play, Paradise Lost, for the American Repertory Theater in 2010. His direction divided critics and audiences alike.

Fish has enjoyed regular collaborations with Bard Summerscape, directing a number of original projects, including The Elliott Smith Project (based on the work of indie rocker Elliott Smith) and Kock Fight Club (an adaptation of A Midsummer Night's Dream).

== Current work ==
In 2010, Daniel Fish began a theatrical investigation into the work of David Foster Wallace at the University of Rochester. The piece was workshopped at the Baryshnikov Art Center in late 2011 and made its New York City premiere in March 2012 at The Chocolate Factory.

In January 2011, Fish directed an adaptation of Nicholas Ray's film Bigger Than Life, entitled Tom Ryan Thinks He's James Mason Starring in a Movie By Nicholas Ray in which a Man's Illness Provides an Escape from the Pain, Pressure and Loneliness of Trying to be the Ultimate American Father, Only to Drive Him Further Into the More Thrilling Though Possibly Lonelier Roles of Addict and Misunderstood Visionary. The work opened at Incubator Arts Project; Time Out New York gave it 5 stars, saying, "The sexiest thing…is Fish's approach, which both loves and ironizes its source, both chills and reheats old material. I left thinking of all the many pieces I want Fish to do in this noir literalist style—and wondering impatiently how quickly he can start."

Regular collaborators include Kaye Voyce, Joshua Thorson, Scott Zielinski, Thomas Jay Ryan, Andrew Lieberman, and Peter Pucci.

Fish's production of Oklahoma!, previously produced at Bard Summerscape and St. Ann's Warehouse, premiered on Broadway at the Circle in the Square Theatre in 2019, garnering him a Tony Award for Best Direction of a Musical nomination. This production transferred to the Young Vic in April 2022 and to the West End's Wyndham's Theatre in February 2023.

== Awards and honors ==
Daniel Fish has taught at the Yale School of Drama, Princeton University, UCSD La Jolla, The New School, and Bard College.

He has been a visiting artist at the American Academy in Rome on two occasions.

== Other work ==
As of 2011, Mr. Fish was in post-production for a film, The Dollar General, which he wrote, directed, and produced.
