= Banana Bag & Bodice =

Ensemble theatre company

Banana Bag & Bodice is a Hudson Valley-based ensemble theatre company that creates original plays with a strong emphasis on text, music and design. They have performed in several venues including The Collapsable Hole, Ontological-Hysteric Theater, PS 122, The Brick Theater, Abrons Arts Center, American Repertory Theater, Joe's Pub, Bushwick Starr, and festivals in San Francisco, New York City, Montreal, Dublin, Edinburgh, Brighton, Bristol and Adelaide.

== History ==
Founded in 1999 in San Francisco by co-artistic directors Jason Craig and Jessica Jelliffe, Banana Bag & Bodice have created 12 original productions. The group is now based in the Hudson Valley NY, but maintains a strong relationship to New York City and the San Francisco Bay Area. Their rock musical Beowulf - A Thousand Years of Baggage, commissioned by the Shotgun Players, won the 2008 Will Glickman Award and a 2011 Edinburgh Festival Herald Angel, and continues to tour internationally.

== Artists ==
- Jason Craig – Co-founder, co-artistic director, writer, performer
- Jessica Jelliffe – Co-founder, co-artistic director, performer
- Peter Blomquist – Performer
- Mallory Catlett – Director, dramaturg
- Miranda K. Hardy – Lighting designer
- Rod Hipskind – Director, performer
- Dave Malloy – Composer, sound designer, performer
- Heather Peroni – Performer
- Zbigniew Bzymek – Video artist for Space//Space

== Works ==
- The Bastard Chronicles (1999)
  - A compendium of oddities
- Number 2 (2000)
  - A drama about death and remembrance
- GULAG HA HA (2002)
  - A study on prison deformation
- Sandwich (2003)
  - A musical about killing animals
- The Young War (2004)
  - A panel discussion on the death of love
- Panel.Animal (2005)
  - A double feature of The Young War and Sandwich
- The Sewers (2006)
  - An aborted living room drama play
- The Fall & Rise of The Rising Fallen (2007)
  - A "making the band" pageant play
- Beowulf - A Thousand Years Of Baggage (2008)
  - A Banana Bag & Bodice SongPlay
- Space//Space (2009/Play)
  - A claustrophobic container tale
- The Perfect Play (2013)
  - The ultimate nativity musical
- LongYarn (2016)
  - A tell tale told by an old doozy
- Space//Space (2023/Film)
  - A claustrophobic container film
- Interno Inferno (TBA)
  - A poetic posit on the afterlife

== Accolades ==
- 2008 – Will Glickman Award
- 2011 – Edinburgh Festival Herald Angel
