= Leslie Glass =

American novelist (born 1945)

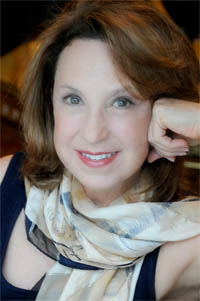
- Born: April 19, 1945 (age 81)
- Occupations: Author, producer/director, recovery advocate,
- Writing career
- Genres: Suspense, fiction, mystery, comedy, nonfiction, documentary
- Notable works: April Woo Suspense Novels, The Secret World of Recovery, The Silent Majority
- Website: authorleslieglass.com

Leslie Glass (born April 19, 1945) is an American author, playwright, journalist, philanthropist, and filmmaker. Along with her daughter, she founded Reach Out Recovery, a United States–based nonprofit addiction recovery organization.

== Writing and film work ==
Glass is the author of fifteen novels, nine of which compose a New York Times Bestselling series. This sequence of novels center around an NYPD detective, April Woo, the first Asian-American female detective in American mainstream fiction. The first title in the series, Burning Time, was published in 1993 by Bantam Books, a Random House imprint.

Glass began her career in advertising and publishing at New York magazine, where she wrote the "Intelligencer" column. Her writing has been featured in Redbook and Cosmopolitan and translated into six foreign languages. She also worked as a scriptwriter for the soap opera Guiding Light.

Her novel Over His Dead Body was produced for the stage by Robert Brustein under the name Strokes at the American Repertory Theater. This work, the novels Getting Away with It, Modern Love, and the entirety of the April Woo series have been optioned for feature films.

Glass produced and directed The Secret World of Recovery. The film was first showcased at Sarasota Film Festival in May 2014. The movie was released in 2014 and was the winner of the 2016 American Society of Addiction Medicine Media Award. In 2013, Glass produced and directed The Silent Majority.

== Reach Out Recovery ==
In 2011 Leslie Glass and her daughter, social worker Lindsey Glass, founded Reach Out Recovery, a nonprofit organization promoting community solutions for recovery from addiction in Sarasota, Florida.

The organization was inspired by Glass's own journey in the recovery world, when about 18 years ago her daughter struggled with substance use in her late teens and early 20s. The lack of resources and support motivated the mother and daughter to provide help for other families facing the same issues.

Leslie Glass produced and directed the 2012 documentary titled "the Secret World of Recovery" which tells some of the mother and daughter story and what happens after people leave addiction treatment and start on the next phase of their lives in recovery. The documentary premiered at the Sarasota Film Festival in 2011 and also won the 2016 Association of Addiction Medicine Media Award.

She produced and directed the Silent Majority, a 2014 teen addiction prevention documentary that premiered at the Gasparilla Film Festival in 2014 and on PBS station WEDU and was distributed by American Public Television to PBS stations nationwide in 2015.

== Bibliography ==
=== Novels ===
==== April Woo Series ====
- Burning Time (1993), Bantam Books
- Hanging Time (1995), Bantam Books
- Loving Time (1996), Bantam Books
- Judging Time (1998), Signet Books
- Stealing Time (1999), Signet Books
- Tracking Time (2000), Signet Books
- The Silent Bride (2002), Onyx
- A Killing Gift (2003), Onyx
- A Clean Kill (2005), Onyx

==== Other works ====
- Getting Away with It (1976), Doubleday Books
- Modern Love (1983), St. Martin's Press
- To Do No Harm (1992) Doubleday Books
- Natural Suspect: A Collaborative Novel (2001), devised by William Bernhardt, Ballantine Books
- Over His Dead Body: A Novel of Sweet Revenge (2003), Ballantine Books
- For Love and Money: A Novel of Stocks and Robbers (2004), Ballantine Books
- Sleeper (2010)

=== Short stories ===
- High Stakes: Eight stories of Gambling and Crime (2003), Robert J. Randisi (Editor), Signet Books
- The Blue Religion: New Stories about Cops, Criminals, and the Chase (2008), Michael Connelly (Editor), Little, Brown and Company

=== Plays ===
- Strokes (1984)
- The Survivors (1989)
- On The Edge (1991)

=== Films ===
- The Secret World of Recovery documentary (2012)
- The Silent Majority documentary (2013)
