= Sam Kissajukian =

Australian stand-up comedian (born 1986)

- Born: 1986 (age 39–40); Sydney, Australia
- Notable work: 300 Paintings; Museum of Modernia; Paintings of Modernia

Comedy career
- Medium: Stand-up, solo performance, visual art
- Genres: Observational comedy, autobiographical performance
- Subjects: Bipolar disorder, creative process, mental health, contemporary art world
- Website: samkissajukian.com

Sam Kissajukian (born 1986) is an Australian stand-up comedian and visual artist based in Sydney. He is best known for his autobiographical solo show 300 Paintings.

== Career ==
Kissajukian began his stand-up career in the early 2010s and performed on the Australian comedy circuit for over a decade.

In 2021, Kissajukian took a hiatus from stand-up to pursue visual art. During a period later diagnosed as a manic episode, he rented an abandoned warehouse in Sydney and produced 300 large-scale paintings over five months during lockdown. The period ended in a depressive episode, and he was diagnosed with bipolar disorder in May 2022. He developed the experience into 300 Paintings, a multimedia solo show combining stand-up comedy, storytelling, and projections of his artwork. The show premiered at Sydney Fringe Festival in September 2022, where it won the Best Comedy and the Festival Director's Choice award. 300 Paintings subsequently toured Australian festivals including the Melbourne Fringe, Adelaide Fringe, Brisbane Comedy Festival, and Perth's Fringe World.

In 2023 and 2024, he developed a companion work, Museum of Modernia, an immersive comedy show in which his paintings are displayed on a large LED screen as he guides the audience through a fictional digital museum. At the 2024 Adelaide Fringe, his exhibition Paintings of Modernia won the Eran Svigos Award for Best Visual Art (Solo Exhibition), while Museum of Modernia received the Mental Health Awareness Award.

Later in 2024, Kissajukian presented 300 Paintings at Summerhall during the Edinburgh Festival Fringe. The show received a four-star review from The Scotsman and a Lustrum Award from Summerhall.

Kissajukian made his Off-Broadway debut with 300 Paintings at the Vineyard Theatre in New York in late 2024. The initial run sold out and was extended into early 2025. The New Yorker described the show as a "beautifully frank" solo piece. In 2025, Kissajukian was nominated for the Drama Desk Award for Outstanding Solo Performance, while 300 Paintings received nominations for a Lucille Lortel Award and an Outer Critics Circle Award for Outstanding Solo Show.

== Exhibitions ==
Kissajukian has held solo exhibitions alongside his performances. In 2023, his work was exhibited at the Maitland Regional Art Gallery in New South Wales and at the Brisbane Powerhouse. He returned to Brisbane Powerhouse in 2024 and held a pop-up exhibition at the Stanley Street Gallery in Sydney.

During the 2024 Edinburgh Festival Fringe, his paintings were displayed at Summerhall. Later that year, his work was exhibited at the Vineyard Theatre in New York City, where the exhibition continued into 2025.
