= Vampire Cowboys Theatre Company =

Theatre company in New York City

Vampire Cowboys Theatre Company is an Obie Award and Caffe Cino Award-winning NYC downtown theatre company first established in 2000, with a mission towards the creation and production of theatrical events based in stage combat and dark comedy with a comic book edge.

The group began on the campus of Ohio University, and moved to NYC in 2002. It has been a resident company at Center Stage, NY (2005–2008); HERE Arts Center (2009–2010); Incubator Arts Project (2011–2013); and the New Ohio Theater & IRT (2013–2015).

The company is led by artistic director Qui Nguyen and Robert Ross Parker.

Past productions include the cult Off-Off Broadway shows Geek!, The Inexplicable Redemption of Agent G, Alice in Slasherland, Soul Samurai, Fight Girl Battle World, Men of Steel, Vampire Cowboy Trilogy, and Living Dead in Denmark, which featured special effects by Chuck Varga, co-founder of the shock rock band Gwar.

The first theatre company to ever be sponsored by New York Comic Con, Vampire Cowboys is often credited for being the pioneers of "Geek Theatre", a subgenre of theatre that incorporates action-adventure, sci-fi, gaming, and comic book themes into live theatre.

The company was praised by The Village Voice as "New York's Best Army of Geeks".

The Vampire Cowboys had their work documented in a doctoral dissertation on martial arts on the American stage at Tufts University in 2011.
