= Rachel Chavkin =

American theatre director (born 1980)

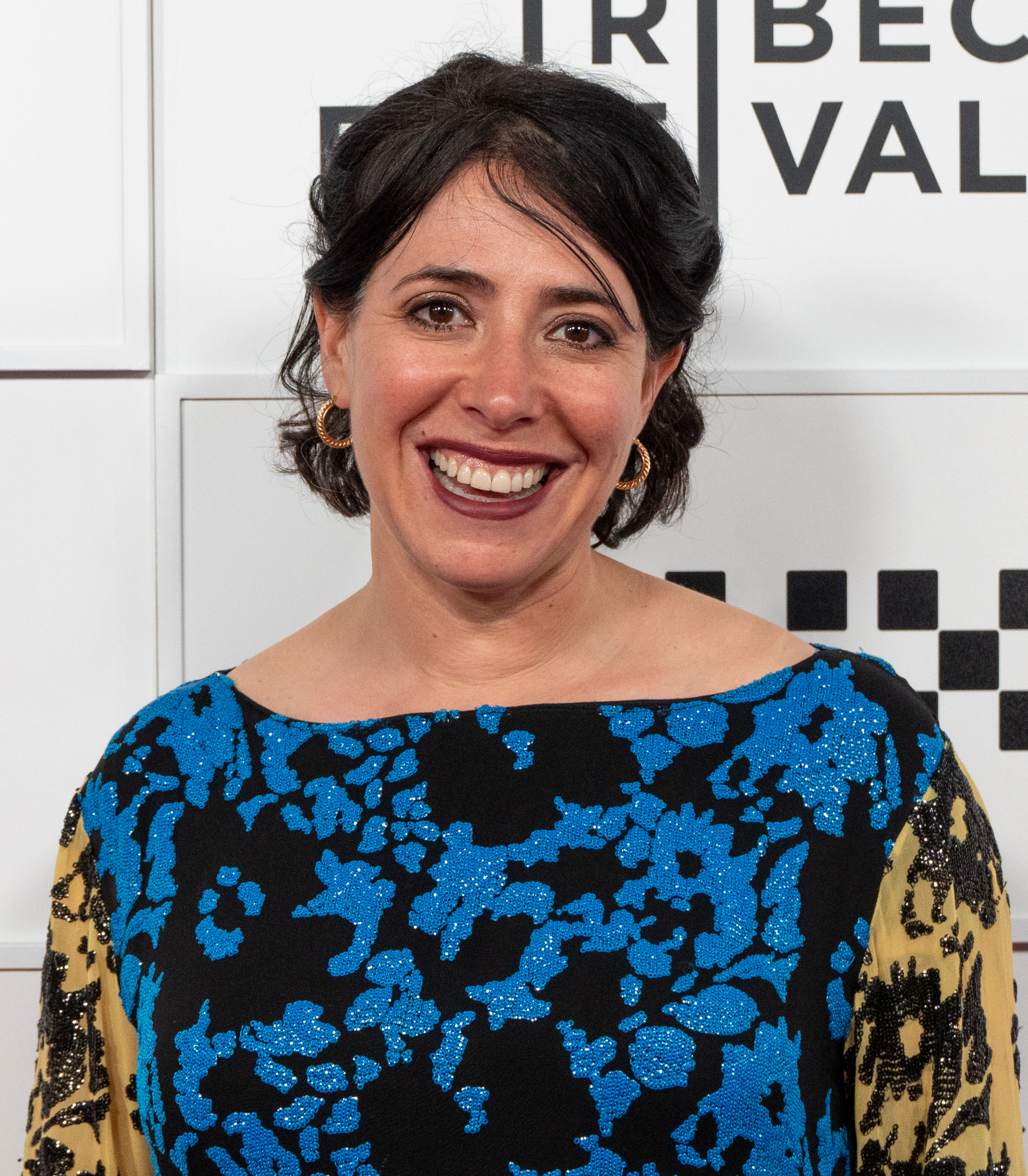
- Chavkin in 2026
- Born: July 20, 1980 (age 46); Washington, D.C., U.S.
- Education: New York University (BFA); Columbia University (MFA)
- Occupation: Director
- Spouse: Jake Heinrichs (m. 2011)
- Relatives: Sara Rosenbaum (mother)

Rachel Chavkin (/tʃæˈv.kɪn/; born July 20, 1980) is an American stage director best known for directing the musicals Natasha, Pierre, & The Great Comet of 1812 and Hadestown, receiving nominations for a Tony Award for Best Direction of a Musical for both and winning for Hadestown in 2019.

== Early life and education ==
Chavkin was born in Washington, D.C., where her parents were civil rights lawyers. She was raised in the Washington suburb of Silver Spring, Maryland. Chavkin attended Stagedoor Manor summer camp.

She is a non-practicing Jew.

She has a BFA from New York University and an MFA from Columbia University.

== Career ==
Chavkin currently holds the position of Artistic Director of The TEAM, and has worked to direct and produce many pieces for The TEAM, including award-winning and internationally touring plays, such as RoosevElvis, Mission Drift, and Architecting.

She directed Three Pianos which ran off-off-Broadway at the Ontological-Hysteric Theater in March 2010 and then at the New York Theatre Workshop in December 2010 to January 2011. She won the 2010 Obie Award, Obie Special Citation for Three Pianos.

Chavkin has worked in collaboration with actor and fellow playwright Taylor Mac across multiple projects, including The Lily’s Revenge and Act 2 (HERE), and with Chris Thorpe, including Confirmation and Status.

Chavkin directed Dave Malloy's Natasha, Pierre & The Great Comet of 1812, which ran off-Broadway in 2013–2014. Natasha, Pierre & The Great Comet of 1812 received the 2013 Obie Award, Special Citation. Under her direction, the musical opened on Broadway at the Imperial Theatre on November 14, 2016. At the 71st Tony Awards, the musical received twelve nominations, the highest number for the 2016–17 season, including a nomination for Chavkin for Best Director of a Musical.

She directed The Royale by Marco Ramirez, off-Broadway at Lincoln Center, which opened in March 2016. She was nominated for the 2016 Drama Desk Award for Outstanding Director of a Play for directing The Royale. She received the 2016 Obie Award, Direction, for The Royale.

Chavkin directed the folk opera Hadestown, written by Anaïs Mitchell, which opened officially at the off-Broadway New York Theatre Workshop on May 23, 2016. Following productions in Edmonton and London, Hadestown opened on Broadway in April 2019 at the Walter Kerr Theatre. She went on to win the Tony Award for Best Direction of a Musical. She directed Anything That Gives Off Light at the Edinburgh International Festival in August 2016, in a co-production with The TEAM and The National Theatre of Scotland.

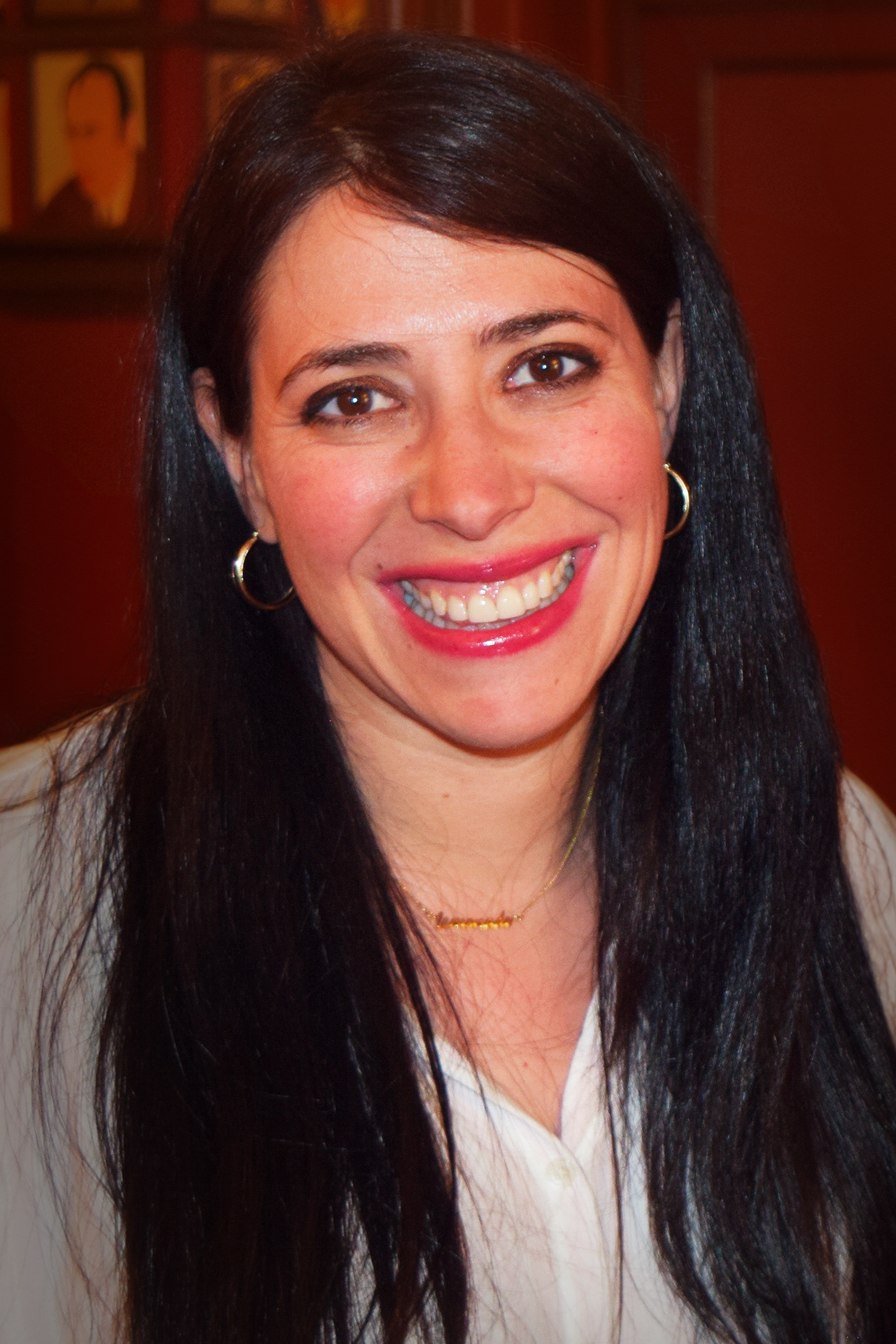
Chavkin at Sardi's (2023)

In 2017, Chavkin was presented with the Smithsonian Award for Ingenuity along with Dave Malloy.

In 2018, she directed Lempicka, which premiered on July 20 at the Williamstown Theater Festival. It transferred to Broadway and opened at the Longacre Theater on April 14, 2024, closing on May 19, 2024.

Chavkin directed the world premiere of Dave Malloy's Moby-Dick, which opened at Harvard's American Repertory Theater in Cambridge, Massachusetts on December 11, 2019.

The Thanksgiving Play made its Broadway debut at the Hayes Theater in 2023, directed by Chavkin. It was the first play by a female Native American playwright (Larissa FastHorse) produced on Broadway.

On February 22, 2023, it was announced that Chavkin would be directing the Broadway-aimed Gatsby musical adaptation, which premiered on June 5, 2024 at the American Repertory Theater.

Chavkin will direct the upcoming world premiere of The Lunchbox, a musical based on the movie of the same name, at Berkley Repertory Theatre in May 2026. The Lunchbox features a book and lyrics by the film's director/writer Ritesh Batra, with music and additional lyrics by The Lazours.

== Directing style ==
In an article in American Theatre, it was noted that she has a "diverse slate of work" united with "a distinctively multisensory sensibility.... When she staged Meg Miroshnik's The Fairytale Lives of Russian Girls at Yale Repertory Theatre, she included a live female punk band; her work with the TEAM routinely blends text, video, and pervasive sound design. 'She can squeeze a lot into a small space, and yet it feels epic and sprawling,' said Ars Nova artistic director Jason Eagan." Her collaborator Bess Wohl said, "I so often see women directors’ work being compared to the theatrical equivalent of needlepoint—small and delicate....[Chavkin] favors the brash and huge and messy."

== Personal life ==
Chavkin married Jake Heinrichs in 2011.

== Awards and nominations ==
Year	Award	Category	Work	Result
2013	Obie Award	Special Citations	Natasha, Pierre & The Great Comet of 1812	Won
2013	Drama Desk Award	Outstanding Director of a Musical	Natasha, Pierre & The Great Comet of 1812	Nominated
2014	Lucille Lortel Award	Outstanding Director	Natasha, Pierre & The Great Comet of 1812	Nominated
2016	Obie Award	Best Director	The Royale: A Play in Six Rounds	Won
2016	Elliot Norton Award	Outstanding Director, Large Theatre	Natasha, Pierre & The Great Comet of 1812	Won
2017	Drama Desk Award	Outstanding Director of a Musical	Natasha, Pierre & The Great Comet of 1812	Won
2017	Tony Award	Best Direction of a Musical	Natasha, Pierre & The Great Comet of 1812	Nominated
2017	American Ingenuity Award	History	Natasha, Pierre & The Great Comet of 1812	Won
2019	Tony Award	Best Direction of a Musical	Hadestown	Won
2019	Drama Desk Award	Outstanding Director of a Musical	Hadestown	Won
2019	Outer Critics Circle Awards	Outstanding Director of a Musical	Hadestown	Won
2020	Elliot Norton Award	Outstanding Director, Large Theatre	Moby-Dick	Won
