= Alec Duffy =

Writer and director

Alec Duffy (born 1975) is an Obie Award winning writer and director, and the Artistic Director of Hoi Polloi and JACK, a performing arts space in Clinton Hill, Brooklyn.

== Career ==
Duffy has written and directed several shows with his theater company, Hoi Polloi, including Shadows, All Hands and The less we talk. As a member of the Essentials, Duffy co-wrote the musical comedy Perfect Harmony, wrote an original song for the show and provided musical arrangements. In 2011, he founded JACK, a performing arts space in Clinton Hill, Brooklyn, with his wife and Tony Awards winner Mimi Lien, and other co-founders. He performs there regularly with his avant-garde theatre improv band, The Georges. In 2011, Duffy won an Obie Award for his work on Three Pianos.

In 2007, Alec had recorded a song entitled "Every Day is Christmas", which he entered into a competition held by Sufjan Stevens. Alec won the competition, and thus was given the rights to the Sufjan Stevens' song "Lonely Man of Winter", which Alec would play at private listening parties he held in a variety of places all over the world. In 2018, Alec decided to release the Sufjan song he owned, "Lonely Man of Winter", through Sufjan's record label, Asthmatic Kitty Records. The song was released alongside a 2018 recording of the song (entitled "Lonely Man of Winter (Doveman Mix)") which featured Melissa Mary Ahern, and "Every Day is Christmas". All funds raised by the sale of the three songs would go towards Alec's performance venue, JACK.

In September 2022, Duffy joined the staff team at The POINT CDC.
