= War & Peace (2016 TV series) =

2016 British television serial

- Genre: Period drama
- Based on: War and Peace by Leo Tolstoy
- Written by: Andrew Davies
- Directed by: Tom Harper
- Starring: Paul Dano; Lily James; James Norton; Jessie Buckley; Jack Lowden; Aisling Loftus; Tom Burke; Tuppence Middleton; Callum Turner; Adrian Edmondson; Rebecca Front; Greta Scacchi; Aneurin Barnard; Mathieu Kassovitz; Stephen Rea; Brian Cox; Kenneth Cranham; Ken Stott; Gillian Anderson; Jim Broadbent
- Composer: Martin Phipps
- Country of origin: United Kingdom
- Original language: English (Note: The series also features songs in Russian, church services in Old Church Slavonic, and some French dialogue.)
- No. of series: 1
- No. of episodes: 6

Production
- Executive producers: Andrew Davies; Bethan Jones; Faith Penhale; Simon Vaughan; Harvey Weinstein; Robert Walak
- Producer: Julia Stannard
- Production locations: Russia; Lithuania; Latvia
- Cinematography: George Steel
- Editors: Mark Eckersley; Steven Worsley
- Running time: 60–82 minutes
- Production companies: BBC Cymru Wales; The Weinstein Company; Lookout Point; BBC Worldwide

Original release
- Network: BBC One; BBC One HD
- Release: 3 January – 7 February 2016

War & Peace is a British historical drama television serial first broadcast on BBC One on 3 January 2016, produced by BBC Cymru Wales, in association with The Weinstein Company, Lookout Point and BBC Worldwide. It is a six-part adaptation of the 1869 novel War and Peace by the Russian author Leo Tolstoy, written by Andrew Davies and directed by Tom Harper. War & Peace aired on A&E, Lifetime and History Channel in the United States as four two-hour episodes, beginning on 18 January 2016. The serial stars Paul Dano, Lily James and James Norton in the leading roles.

== Plot ==
The saga begins in the Russian Empire in 1805. When Pierre, Natasha and Andrei are first introduced to viewers, their youthful ambition, despite their privileged circumstances, is to find meaning in their lives. Kind-hearted but awkward Pierre, the illegitimate son of Russia's richest man, wants to change the world for the better. The spirited Natasha is searching for true love, while handsome and gallant Andrei, frustrated with the superficiality of society, seeks a higher purpose.

At the same time, the French army under Napoleon edges ever closer to Russia's borders. Natasha's older brother Nikolai joins the Imperial Russian Army immediately and matures during the war against Napoleon. Like Pierre, Natasha and Andrei, he also experiences romantic vicissitudes: despite his childhood love for his cousin Sonya, his impoverished parents insist he marry a rich bride like the superficial Julie Karagina or the religious Marya Bolkonskaya.

Having begun with Napoleon's military campaign against Russia and Austria in 1805, the story concludes in 1812 after Napoleon's invasion of Russia has failed and he has retreated and withdrawn from Russian territory. The families at the centre of the saga have undergone major changes and lost members, but those remaining have experienced a transformation and a new life, with new growth and new families started.

== Cast ==
=== Principal ===
- Paul Dano as Pierre Bezukhov
- Lily James as Natasha Rostova
- James Norton as Andrei Bolkonsky
- Tuppence Middleton as Hélène Kuragina
- Callum Turner as Anatole Kuragin
- Stephen Rea as Prince Vasily Kuragin
- Jessie Buckley as Marya Bolkonskaya
- Jim Broadbent as Prince Nikolai Bolkonsky
- Jack Lowden as Nikolai Rostov
- Aisling Loftus as Sonya Rostova
- Adrian Edmondson as Count Ilya Rostov
- Greta Scacchi as Countess Natalya Rostova
- Kenneth Cranham as Uncle Mikhail
- Rebecca Front as Anna Mikhaylovna Drubetskaya
- Aneurin Barnard as Boris Drubetskoy
- Tom Burke as Fyodor Dolokhov
- Mathieu Kassovitz as Napoleon Bonaparte
- Brian Cox as General Mikhail Kutuzov
- Ken Stott as Osip Alexeevich Bazdeev, the Freemason
- Gillian Anderson as Anna Pavlovna Scherer

=== Supporting ===
- Kate Phillips as Lise Bolkonskaya
- Olivia Ross as Mademoiselle Bourienne, Marya's live-in social companion
- Thomas Arnold as Vaska Denisov
- Adrian Rawlins as Platon Karataev
- Fenella Woolgar as Catiche Kuragina
- David Quilter as Tikhon
- Ben Lloyd-Hughes as Tsar Alexander
- Otto Farrant as Petya Rostov
- Kit Connor as Young Petya Rostov
- Chloe Pirrie as Julie Kuragina
- Rory Keenan as Bilibin
- Terence Beesley as General Bennigsen
- Pip Torrens as Prince Bagration
- Guillaume Faure as Napoleon's Adjutant
- Ludger Pistor as General Mack

== Episodes ==
Title	Directed by	Written by	Original release date	UK viewers (millions)
"Episode 1"	Tom Harper	Andrew Davies	3 January 2016	9.33
The series opens in Russia in 1805. Napoleon Bonaparte's French army has invaded Austria and now threatens Russia. Pierre Bezukhov, the illegitimate son of a count, is a kindhearted but awkward recent university graduate whose outspoken political views, supportive of the French emperor, are less than fully welcomed by polite society. His social status changes however when he unexpectedly inherits his father's vast wealth and numerous estates. Andrei Bolkonsky, Pierre's close friend and the heir to one of Russia's noblest families, seeks glory and advancement in the Tsar's army opposing Napoleon. Natasha Rostova, from a minor noble's family, is a joyous and yet thoughtful girl, still seeking her future place in society.
"Episode 2"	Tom Harper	Andrew Davies	10 January 2016	7.72
Pierre marries the beautiful and seductive Hélène via her father's machinations, but he soon realises that she is an unloving and mercenary wife. She cuckolds him with his erstwhile friend Dolokhov, whom Pierre then challenges to a duel. Hélène's father also tries, unsuccessfully, to engineer a union between his son Anatole and Andrei's religious sister Marya. The Russian army holds off the French for a while, and Natasha's brother Nikolai returns from the army to his family. The Battle of Austerlitz leaves Andrei badly wounded; he is however finally able to get home in time to see his wife Lise give birth to a son, but she dies in childbirth.
"Episode 3"	Tom Harper	Andrew Davies	17 January 2016	7.33
Although nervous, Pierre defeats Dolokhov in the duel and afterwards separates from Hélène, who demands a fortune from him and begins affairs with other men, including the opportunistic Boris Drubetskoi. A Freemason persuades Pierre to resolve his troubles by joining Freemasonry and by devoting himself to helping others. Pierre's efforts to improve the welfare of his serfs are, however, largely ineffectual. When Nikolai returns home on leave, his army friend Denisov accompanies him and soon proposes to Natasha, who awkwardly declines. Dolokhov stays briefly with the Rostovs and proposes to Natasha's cousin Sonya, who turns him down, confessing her love for Nikolai. Afterwards, in a lengthy card game, Dolokhov wins a huge sum of money from Nikolai, which plunges the Rostov family into enormous debt. Napoleon signs a peace treaty with Russia in 1807. The story moves to the spring of 1809: Andrei has quit the army and has been living a reclusive life out of remorse for neglecting his late wife, but when he meets Natasha while visiting the Rostovs, she and Andrei are mutually smitten.
"Episode 4"	Tom Harper	Andrew Davies	24 January 2016	7.40
Andrei's curmudgeonly father forces him to travel abroad for a year to gain approval for marrying Natasha, which she reluctantly accepts. Despite his financially strapped parents' insistence, Nikolai refuses to marry the wealthy but superficial heiress Julie Karagina, maintaining instead his lifelong love for his cousin Sonya. After failing in his attempt to court Andrei's sister Marya for her fortune, Boris successfully woos Julie with the mournful poetry she likes. After a very awkward meeting with Andrei's father and sister, Natasha feels strongly that they do not like her. Heartbroken and tired of waiting for nearly a year, she is vulnerable when Hélène introduces her to her scoundrel brother Anatole, who tries to secretly elope with her, thus ruining her reputation. Pierre chases Anatole out of Moscow and informs Natasha that Anatole already has a wife in Poland. Natasha is devastated.
"Episode 5"	Tom Harper	Andrew Davies	31 January 2016	7.25
1812: France again breaks the peace with Russia and invades, striking towards Moscow. Andrei, back from his travels abroad, returns all of Natasha's letters and mementos and is unwilling to forgive or speak of her, in spite of Pierre's attempts to soften his heart. Meanwhile, Pierre forces himself to avoid Natasha because he is secretly in love with her but is a married man. After Andrei returns to the army to help defend Russia from the invasion, his erratic father is increasingly difficult for Marya to cope with, and as the French threaten their estate the household is eventually forced to flee after the old prince has a fatal series of strokes. Without her father, Marya is unable to control her rebellious serfs in order to escape the French, but Nikolai Rostov, leading an army detachment, rescues her when he passes through the area; this chance meeting and rescue sparks romance for both of them. Pierre and Andrei meet again prior to the crucial Battle of Borodino. Pierre experiences the gruesome Battle of Borodino as an on-site observer and helper, and gets a true taste of the horrors of war and the courage of soldiers facing death. Andrei fights on the front line and is mortally wounded; in a field hospital he meets the likewise mortally wounded Anatole, whom he had pledged to kill out of revenge, and forgives him instead.
"Episode 6"	Tom Harper	Andrew Davies	7 February 2016	7.39
As the French advance into Moscow, Natasha and her family flee their home for the countryside. They take wounded soldiers with them, and eventually Natasha discovers that Andrei is among them. Natasha begs Andrei for forgiveness and he confesses that he still loves her. Andrei dies, with Natasha, his sister Marya and his son by his side. Back in Moscow, which is being burned and looted, Pierre is carrying a concealed weapon and is captured by the French, almost shot, and then imprisoned instead. He is befriended by Platon Karataev, a peasant who has a profound effect on his outlook on the deepest of levels—teaching him about gratitude, simple happiness, and giving and receiving love. Hélène, by now pregnant, is unable to reach Pierre to gain consent for an annulment and she seeks an abortion after being snubbed at a society party. An abortionist gives her a bottle of liquid of which she is to take only a few drops, but she swallows the lot, and dies alone of haemorrhage during the induced labour. Napoleon, with no supplies left for him in Moscow or anywhere else, orders all of his troops to retreat and leave Russia—thus a Russian victory is secured. After the terrible hardship of a lengthy imprisonment and march through the Russian winter with the French retreating from Moscow, Pierre is rescued by a guerrilla group of Russian soldiers led by Dolokhov and Denisov. The Rostovs' younger son, Petya, is killed in the skirmish, and after hearing this his father, already in shock from the loss of all his property and the burning of Moscow, dies of a broken heart. Sonya releases Nikolai from their engagement, and he instead becomes engaged to, and later marries, Marya. Pierre finally proposes to, and marries, Natasha and starts a family, and their extended family includes the Rostovs, Sonya, and Andrei's son.

== Production ==
The series, a British-American co-production, was announced by Danny Cohen on 18 February 2013 and was commissioned by him and Ben Stephenson, the controller of BBC Drama. The production by BBC Cymru Wales was partnered by The Weinstein Company, Lookout Point and BBC Worldwide.

The cast was announced on 28 December 2014.

The executive producers are Faith Penhale, George Ormond, Andrew Davies, Simon Vaughan, Robert Walak and Harvey Weinstein. The director is Tom Harper. The soundtrack was composed by Martin Phipps.

Beginning in February 2015, the series was filmed in Russia, Lithuania, and Latvia with Arri Alexa digital cameras. Anamorphic lenses were used for their bokeh focus fall-off effects.

== Release ==
In the UK the drama consists of five 60-minute episodes and one 82-minute finale, broadcast on BBC One beginning 3 January 2016 at 9 pm.

In the US, broadcasting began on 18 January 2016 and the series was simulcast across three networks: A&E, Lifetime, and History Channel. It aired in four two-hour blocks over four weeks, at 9 pm ET/PT, on Lifetime.

As of 2025, Amazon Prime runs the series in 8 shorter episodes (43 or 44 min each) for a total run time of 348 minutes, which is 34 minutes shorter than the BBC version (382 min).

In Canada, the show airs at the same time and in the same format as in the United States, but only on A&E.

It aired in Australia on BBC First from 31 January 2016.

The serial also aired in Sweden (SVT), Denmark (TV 2), Norway (NRK), Estonia (ETV), Germany (RTL Passion), Greece (OTE), Lithuania (LNK), Israel (YES), Russia (Channel One), China (LeEco), Taiwan (LeEco), India (Vuclip), South Korea (KBS and SK), Philippines (ABS-CBN, Lifestyle), Belgium (BBC First), the Netherlands (BBC First), Luxembourg (BBC First), Portugal (RTP), Japan (NHK) and Czech Republic (Czech Television).

The show has also been sold to France 2, Finland's YLE, NRK in Norway, RUV in Iceland, Latvia's LTV and TRBC in Ukraine.

=== Home media ===
The entire series of War & Peace was released on DVD and Blu-ray in the United Kingdom and Ireland on 8 February 2016 by BBC DVD. Special features include making-of featurettes.

== Reception ==
On Rotten Tomatoes, a review aggregator website, the series received a score of 88% with an average rating of 8.4 out of 10 from 25 reviews. The website's consensus reads: "War & Peace boasts sumptuous visuals and the narrative remains largely faithful to its sprawling source material, even if the pace may challenge less patient viewers and the period detail is slightly lacking." Metacritic assigned the series a weighted average score of 72 out of 100 based on 11 critics. IMDB rated it 8.1 out of 10. The adaptation was described by Russian reviewers as a “classic with cleavage”, and a “medium-budget soap opera”.
