= List of War and Peace characters =

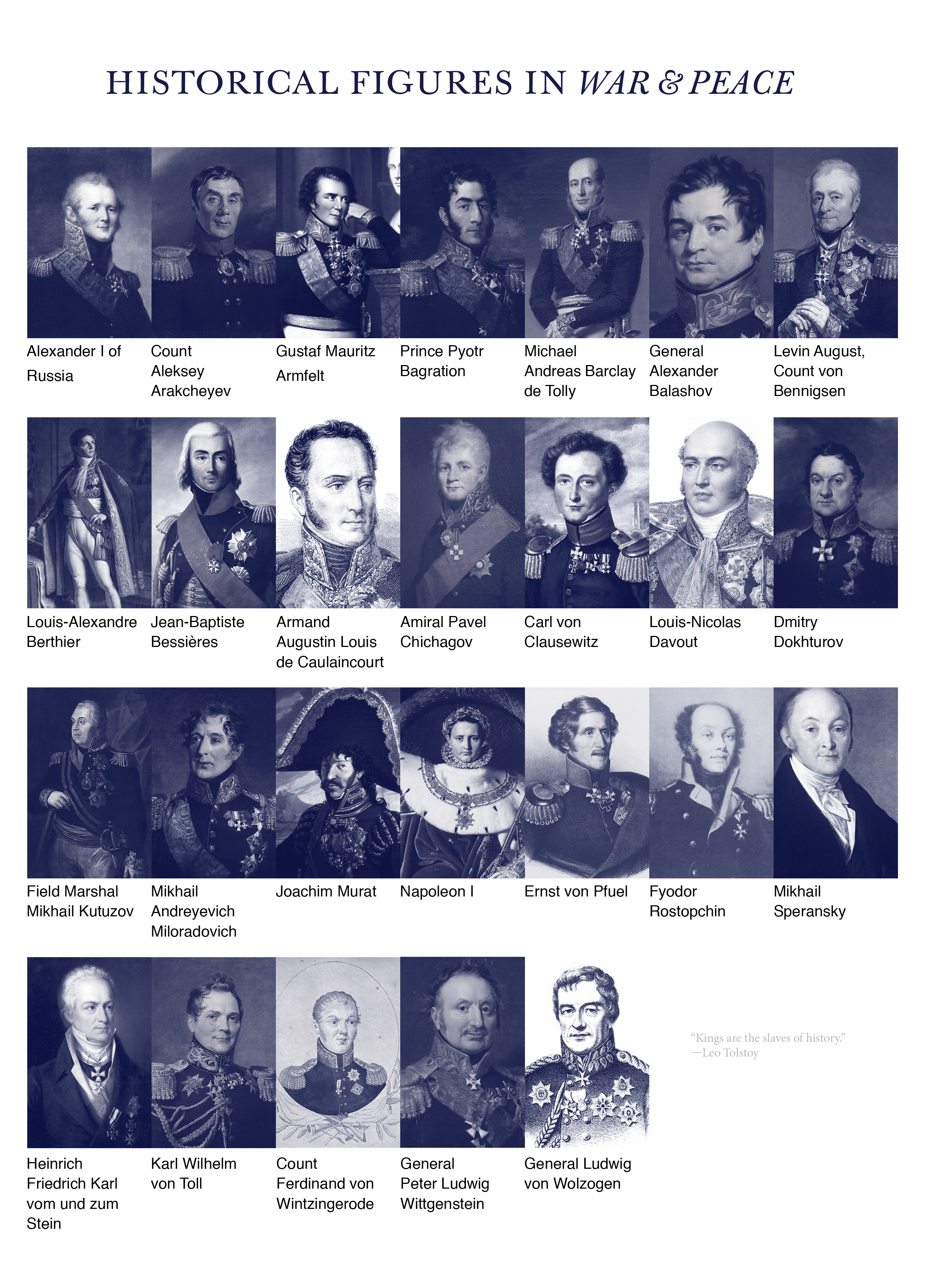
Historical figures mentioned

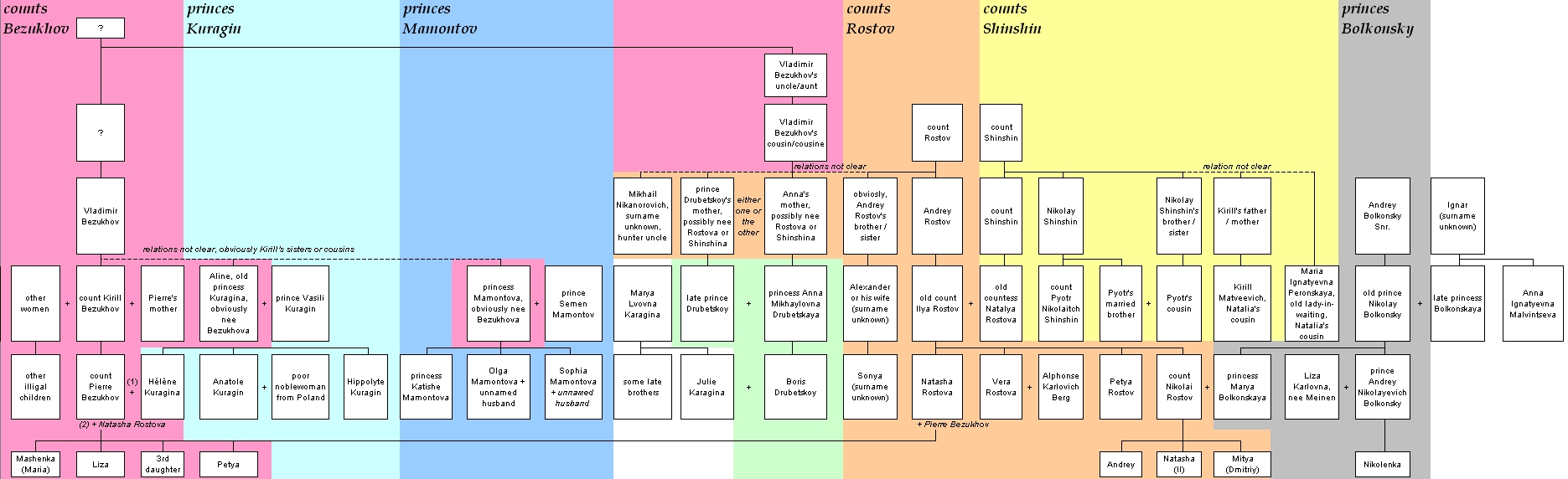
Tree of Rostov, Bolkonsky and other families

This is a list of named characters in Leo Tolstoy's 1869 novel War and Peace. Note that as the work was originally in Russian, some characters' names are Romanized differently in different translations.

== A ==
- Stepan Stepanovich Adraksin – acquaintance of Pierre Bezukhov
- Father Akinfi – monk and confessor of Marya Bolkonskaya.
- Marya Dmitriyevna Akhrosimova – relative of Count Rostov and matchmaker. Strict but respected and admired.
- Tsar Alexander I of Russia (1777–1825) – liberal emperor early in his reign but gradually became more conservative.
- Elizabeth Alexeievna (1779–1826) – empress of Russia.
- Yakov Alpatych – servant and estate manager of Prince Nikolay Bolkonsky; the steward at Bald Hills (the Bolkonsky estate).
- Count Arakcheyev (1769–1834) – severe minister of war in 1809; cruel but cowardly; former minister of war by 1812 but trusted by Tsar Alexander I

== B ==
- General Baggehufwudt (1761–1812) – Russian general, killed at Tarutino
- Prince Bagration (1765–1812) – Russian general, considered "The hero of heroes" by Tolstoy. He is a modest, polite, but very strong character – An accurate image of Bagration in real life. Fought the French in a rear-guard action near Schoengraben in 1805, protecting Kutuzov. Commander of an army in 1812, killed at Borodino.
- Balaga – troika driver for Anatole Kuragin.
- General Balashov (1770–1837) – Adjutant-General in attendance upon the Tsar
- Marshal Barclay de Tolly (1761–1818) – Senior commander of Russian forces in 1812 until replaced by Kutuzov.
- Barthélemy – The second envoy unsuccessfully sent by Napoléon to negotiate peace with Emperor Alexander.
- Joseph Alexéevich Bazdéev – Pierre's benefactor, who introduced him to freemasonry.
- Makar Alexeyevich Bazdeyev – brother of the above
- de Beausset – Prefect of Napoleon's palace
- Belliard – General in the French army at Borodino
- Count Bennigsen (1745–1826) – German leader of Russian at Eylau (a draw) and Friedland (a decisive defeat). A senior commander in 1812.
- Lieutenant Alphonse Karlovich Berg – German husband of Vera Rostova
- Louis Alexandre Berthier (1753–1815) – Napoleon's commander of staff
- Count Kirill Vladimirovich Bezukhov (also Count Bezuhov) – Pierre's father and very wealthy aristocrat who served in Catherine II's court.
- Pierre Bezukhov – The illegitimate son of Count Bezukhov. A freethinking, sometimes reckless, man capable of decisive action and great displays of willpower when circumstances demand it. Inherits Count Bezukhov's fortune, later becomes a Freemason and plans to assassinate Napoleon. Husband of Hélène Kuragina and after her death, of Natasha Rostova. One of the main characters of the story.
- Bilibin – Russian diplomat to Austria. Appears in Vol I, Part II, Chapter 10. Entertains Prince Andrey Bolkonsky during the Prince's stay in Brno to inform the Austrian government of Russian victories.
- Bitsky – "a man who served on various committees and frequented all the different cliques of Petersburg".
- Maria Bogdanovna – midwife attending Princess Lisa Bolkonskaya
- Bolkhovitinov – Messenger from Dolohov to Kutuzov, Oct. 1812
- Prince Andrei Nikolayevich Bolkonsky – Son of Prince Nikolay Bolkonsky. A brave (at times arrogant) soldier who becomes cynical in the Napoleonic Wars. Counterpart to Pierre. Valued adjutant to Kutuzov in 1805. Married to Lisa Bolkonskaya, father of young prince Nikolay Bolkonsky, and afterwards engaged to Natasha Rostova.
- Princess Elisabeta "Lisa" Karlovna Bolkonskaya (also Lise) – née Meinena. Wife of Andrey Bolkonsky. Also called "little princess".
- Princess Marya Bolkonskaya – A woman who struggles between the obligations of her religion and the desires of her heart. Marya lives with her father at his estate, Bald Hills. She is subject to her father's fastidious and demanding schedule and standards. Also called Maria. Eventually married Count Nikolai Rostov.
- Prince Nikolay Andreevitch Bolkonsky – (1) father of Prince Andrey Bolkonsky. When younger, he had been an eminent soldier. Severe and unsympathetic in character, he has a disciplined domestic routine which includes walking, woodworking and giving his daughter Marya lessons. (2) son of Prince Andrey Bolkonsky and his wife Lise, who died in childbirth. Brought up largely by his aunt Princess Marya Bolkonsky.
- Napoléon Bonaparte (1769–1821) – The Great Man, ruined by great blunders.
- Vincent Bosse – French drummer-boy, captured by Denisov
- Mademoiselle Bourienne – orphaned French companion to Princess Marya Bolkonskaya and her father.
- General Broussier (1766–1814) – French divisional commander
- Captain Brozin – officer of the Russian army at Tarutino
- Agrafena Ivanovna Byelova – a country neighbour of the Rostovs

== C ==
- General Campan
- Marquis de Caulaincourt (1773–1827) – French ambassador to Russia
- General Chatrov – an old comrade in arms of Prince Nikolai Bolkonsky
- Pavel Vasilievich Chichagov (1767–1849) or Tchichagov (8 July [O.S. 27 June] 1767 – 20 August 1849) – was a Russian military and naval commander of the Napoleonic wars.
- Carl von Clausewitz (1780–1831) – As one of two German staff officers, in the Russian service, that ride past Prince Andrei the night of the eve of battle of Borodino (The other is Wolzogen).
- Prince Czartoryski (1770–1861) – Minister of Foreign Affairs.

== D ==
- Danilo – Huntsman for Nikolai Rostov
- General Davout (1770–1823) – French marshal, competent but also capable of cruelty
- Vasily "Vas'ka" Denisov – Russian military officer, friend to Nikolai Rostov. He tends to pronounce some of his R's like Gh's, almost like a Russian accent with English. Eventually a general of partisan troops during the French retreat from Moscow. Proposed unsuccessfully to Natasha Rostova.
- Monsieur Dessalles – A Swiss teacher for young prince Nikolay Bolkonsky.
- Lelorme d'Ideville – an interpreter
- Dimmler – musician in the Rostov household
- Dmitri Onufrich – Family solicitor of Count Bezukhov.
- Dmitri Vasileyevich – "Miten'ka." Account manager of the Rostovs.
- Prince Dolgorukov (1777–1806) – Russian general
- General Dokhturov (1756–1816) – One of the characters used as a mouthpiece by Tolstoy to express his disillusionment with the tendency of historians to attribute the course of events to the will of certain iconic, often heroic figures despite the fact that more obscure but perhaps equally influential characters contributed to the eventual outcome. Unheralded but played a decisive role at Austerlitz, Smolensk, Borodino, and Maley Yaroslavetz.
- Fedor Ivanovich Dolokhov (Fedya) – Valiant in battle. A partisan leader in 1812. A cold man, he is a noted duelist and drinker, but is caring for his disadvantaged family. He once duels with Pierre and is nearly killed. Was rumored to be having an affair with Helene Bezukhov. Proposed unsuccessfully to Sonya. His possible prototypes were Count Fyodor Ivanovich Tolstoy, (also known as the "American"), Rufin Dorokhov (friend of Lermontov, killed during the Caucasian War), and renowned partisan leader Colonel Alexandre Figner. Later participates in guerilla attacks against the retreating French.
- Maria Ivanovna Dolokhova – mother of Fedor Dolokhov
- Dron Zakhárych (Drónushka) – Village elder of Bogutcharovo
- Princess Anna Mikhaylovna Drubetskaya – Friend of and cousin Countess Rostova and a relative of Count Kirill Vladimirovich Bezukhov, one of the richest people in the Russian Empire. Although she was an impoverished, elderly widow she belonged to one of the most ancient aristocratic families in Russia. Supporter of Boris, her son.
- Boris Drubetskoy – ambitious son of Princess Anna Mikhaylovna Drubetskaya and godson of the old and rich Count Kirill Vladimirovich Bezukhov. Army officer; fought at Austerlitz and later married Julie Karagina, thereby becoming rich. Childhood friend of Countess Rostova.
- Dunyasha – Princess Marya Bolkonsky's childhood nurse who has remained a faithful servant to the family.

== E ==
- Eykhen – officer of the General Staff at Tarutino

== F ==
- Colonel Fabvier – of the French army in Spain
- Feoktist – "famous head chef" of the English Club
- Maria Feodorovna (1759–1828) (also Marya Fyodorovna) – Dowager empress of Russia
- Archduke Ferdinand Karl Joseph of Austria-Este (1754–1806)
- Filipp – footman to Prince Nikolai Bolkonsky
- Emperor Francis I of Austria (1768–1835)
- Baron Funke

== G ==
- Prince Galitzine (1769–1813) – A nobleman who has hired a tutor to instruct him in Russian, as French, the language preferred by the upper classes, became identified with the enemy.
- Gavrilo – Maria Dmitrievna's "gigantic footman"
- Gerasim – Servant to Bazdeyef
- Gervais – Associate of Speranski
- Glinka – editor of the Russian Messenger
- Major-General Grekov – Commanded two regiments of cossacks under Orlov-Denisov at Taratino. Initially routed French under Marat.

== H ==
- Maria Hendrihovna – wife of the Russian army's regimental doctor
- Hvostikov – friend of Anatole Kuragin

== I ==
- Ilyin – Friend of Nikolai Rostov, junior officer in the Army
- Iogel – dancing master and organiser of balls in Moscow
- Mikhail Ivanovich – Taciturn architect employed by Prince Nikolay Bolkonsky

== J ==
- Julner – colonel in Napoleon's army

== K ==
- Julie Karagina – wealthy heiress. Friend of Marya Bolkonskaya. Married Boris Drubetskoy.
- Marya Lvovna Karagina – mother of Julie Karagina.
- Platon Karataev – peasant who influences Pierre Bezukhov during his time as a prisoner of war. Killed by the French for not being able to keep up.
- Archduke Karl of Austria (1771–1847)
- Karp – a peasant at Bald Hills, the leader of a small revolt after the old Count Bolkonsky has died.
- Andrei Sergeich Kaysarov – brother of Paisi Kaysarov
- Paisi Kaysarov (1783–1844) – Kutuzov's adjutant in the Battle of Borodino.
- Kirsten – Staff-Captain who is listed as very honorable and proud of his regiment. He is said to have been demoted twice due "affairs of honour," and has twice been reinstated to his current rank.
- Count Kochubey – associate of Andrei Bolkonsky in St Petersburg (in Book 2 part 3)
- Komarov – cossack with Petya Rostov in irregular forces
- Kondratyevna – elderly housemaid in the Rostov household
- Pyotr Konovnitsyn – Like Dokhturov, a character Tolstoy expresses his admiration of in order to reconcile the reader to the fact that the successful defense of Russia could not be achieved by those recognised by history alone.
- Prince Kozlovsky – aide-de-camp to General Kutuzov (see below)
- Aline Kuragina – Wife of Vasili Kuragin who only appears once in the novel.
- Anatole Kuragin – son of Vasili Kuragin. Handsome, irresponsible and somewhat hedonistic military officer. Planned to seduce Natasha Rostova.
- Hélène Kuragina – daughter of Vasili Kuragin. Later Countess Bezukhova (wife of Pierre Bezukhov). Beautiful, self-serving woman. Rumored at one point to have an affair with Fyodor Dolokhov.
- Hippolyte Kuragin (also Prince Ippolit) – son of Vasili Kuragin. A dull and boring man. A diplomat and the butt of Bilibin's humor.
- Vasili Sergeevich Kuragin (also Prince Vassily) – self-seeking man who has a low opinion of his children but seeks to further their interests. Convinces Pierre Bezukhov to marry his daughter Hélène despite Pierre's reservations. Prince Vasili is self-serving and manipulative throughout the novel, and consistently attempts to swindle Pierre Bezukhov.
- General Kutuzov (1745–1813) – real-life Russian general featuring throughout the book. His diligence and modesty eventually save Russia from lasting French occupation.
- Mavra Kuzminishna – elderly servant of the Rostovs.

== L ==
- Count Langeron (1763–1831) – Noble who left France. A commander on the Russian side at Austerlitz, where his troops were decimated.
- Dominique Jean Larrey (1766–1842) – surgeon to Napoleon
- Jacques Lauriston (1768–1828) – The first of two envoys sent to Kutuzov by Napoléon in an attempt to negotiate peace.
- Lavrushka – Valet to Denisov. A rogue, later valet to Nikolai Rostov. Misled Napoleon.
- Lazarev – Soldier at Kozlovski's battalion, was awarded a medal by Napoleon.
- Lihachov – a Cossack in Denisov's guerilla force
- Prince Lopuhin – dinner guest of Prince Nikolai Bolkonsky
- Lorrain – Doctor present at the death of Count Bezukhov.
- Esaul Lovaisky the Third – hetman Cossack with Denisov's irregulars

== M ==
- General Mack (1752–1828) – Austrian general. Defeated at Ulm, 1805.
- Magnitsky – Associate of Speransky, chairman of the Committee on Army Regulations.
- Makarin – friend of Anatole Kuragin
- Malasha — granddaughter of Andrew Savyostayanov, six years old at the time of her appearance in 1812
- Anna Ignatyevna Malvintsev – Princess Marya's aunt on her Mother's side, whose matchmaking abilities bring Nikolai Rostov and Marya together after she meets the prospective suitor at a soirée in Voronezh.
- Princess Katerina "Katishe" Mamontova – one of Count Bezukhov's nieces. Eldest of the "three princesses."
- Princess Sophia Mamontova – one of Count Bezukhov's nieces. Youngest of the "three princesses."
- Matriona – a young Romani woman associated with Dolokhov
- Mavra – a maid in the Rostov household.
- Pelageya Danilovna Melyukova – a neighbour of the Rostovs
- Métivier – French doctor fashionable in Moscow in 1811
- Michaud – A Russian colonel. Brought news of the abandonment of Moscow to Tsar Alexander.
- Mikhail Nikanorych – Distant relative of the Rostovs who lives near their estate at Otradnoe, he is also referred to as Uncle.
- General Miloradovich (1771–1825) – Russian general in 1812 after Napoleon retreated from Moscow, previously Commander of a column at Austerlitz.
- Mitka – Mikhail Nikanorych's coachman and good balalaika player.
- Morel – orderly to Captain Ramballe
- Abbé Morio – In the initial scene he is repeatedly referred to as 'the Abbé'; based on the real life priest and writer Scipione Piattoli.
- Vicomte Mortemart – In the initial scene he is repeatedly referred to as 'the vicomte'.
- General Mouton (1770–1838) – The first Frenchman of consequence to explicitly accept that the best policy is to flee Russia.
- Marshal Murat (1767–1815) – French marshal, Napoleon's brother-in-law, styled as the King of Naples. With Napoleon in 1812 at Borodino. Retreated at Tarutino.

== N ==
- Nastasya Ivanovna – Cross-dressing "old buffoon" who lives with the Rostovs at their estate at Otradnoe.
- Prince Nesvitsky – A Russian staff officer who acts as Pierre's second in the duel with Dolokhov.
- Marshal Ney (1769–1815) – French marshal. Fought at Borodino.
- Nikolay Nikolayevich Novosiltsev (1761–1838) – A Russian statesman and a close aide to Alexander I of Russia.

== O ==
- Count Orlov-Denisov (1775–1843) – Commander of Cossacks who alone reached the assigned position at Taratino. His forces caused Murat to retreat.
- Count Osterman-Tolstoy (1770–1857) – Present at a council near Moscow during the retreat to beyond that city.

== P ==
- Maria Ignatyevna Peronskaya – Friend and relation of Countess Natalya Rostova.
- Katerina Petrovna
- Karl Ludwig von Phull (1757–1826) – German chief organizer of Russian Plan of Campaign in 1812. Contemptuous of other theorists.
- Count Platov (1753–1818) – Officer in whose division Nicholas Rostov was assigned.
- Prokofy – footman in the Rostov household

== R ==
- General Raevsky (1771–1829) – Russian general at the middle of the action at Borodino.
- Captain Ramballe – 13th Light Regiment, Chevalier of the Legion of Honor. Met Pierre Bezukhov in Moscow. Weak after Krasnoe.
- Count Jean Rapp (1771–1821) – adjutant to Napoleon at Borodino.
- Prince Repnin – squadron commander of Russian army at Austerlitz.
- Count Rostopchin (1763–1826) – governor-general of Moscow.
- Count Ilya Rostov – head of the Rostov family. He is poor with finances and loses the family fortune.
- Countess Natalya Rostova – wife of Count Ilya.
- Natasha Rostova – initially a romantic young girl, she evolves through trial and suffering, including engagement to Prince Bolkonsky which is terminated by her unfaithfulness, then later by his death, and eventually finds domestic happiness with Pierre Bezukhov.
- Nikolai Rostov – the eldest Rostov son, who joins the Russian military in 1805. Though he promises himself to his cousin Sonya, he eventually marries Princess Marya Bolkonskaya.
- Petya Rostov – the youngest Rostov son. Becomes a soldier against his mother's wishes. He is killed during a raid on the French during their retreat.
- Vera Rostova – the oldest Rostov daughter, she eventually marries Lieutenant Berg.

== S ==
- Praskovya Savishna – nurse in the Bolkonsky household
- Anna Pavlovna Scherer – a wealthy St. Petersburg socialite and matchmaker. Unmarried hostess of patriotic circle.
- General Schmitt (1743–1805) – Austrian general killed in battle at Krems, where Kutuzov won a victory.
- Madame Schoss – associate of the Rostov household
- Shapovalov – The Cossack who stumbled upon the left flank of Murat's army on October 2 while pursuing a hare and the inactivity he witnessed was sufficient evidence to support the Battle of Tarutino.
- Shcherbinin – Gen. Konovnitsyn's adjutant in 1812.
- Pyotr Nikolaitch Shinshin – relative of Countess Natalya Rostova. Famous for biting wit.
- Smolyaninov – Freemason rhetor.
- Sonya – The orphaned niece of Count and Countess Rostov. The Rostovs take Sonya in and raise her. She is engaged to Nikolai throughout most of the book, but she eventually consents to his marrying Princess Marya. Sonya is characterized by the sacrifices she makes for the Rostovs, whom she feels indebted to for raising her.
- Count Speransky (1772–1839) – liberal advisor to the Tsar. Eventually dismissed by Tsar Alexander.
- Stevens – An English naval officer, mentioned briefly early on in the novel.
- Stolypin – Associate of Speranski.
- Suhtelen – Lieutenant in Russian army wounded at Austerlitz

== T ==
- Semeon Tchekmar – Valet to Count Ilya Rostov
- Lieutenant Telyanin – In Denisov's squadron early in the novel. Not well liked.
- Theodosia – a religious pilgrim known to Maria Bolkonskaya.
- Tikhon Shtcherbatov – Peasant scout with Denisov's partisan force.
- Tikhon - old Bolkonsky's manservant
- Timohin – Officer who had a predilection for Bacchus. Valiant in battle.
- Capt. von Toll – Helped Alexander across a ditch after the rout of the Russian center at Austerlitz. A colonel in 1812.
- Count Tolstoy – Grand marshal of the Russian court in 1805; Member of the Tsar's suite in 1812.
- Staff Captain Tushin – Commander of a battery of four cannon that fought valiantly and successfully at Schoengraben. Lost an arm at Friedland.
- Tutolmin – A diplomat sent by Napoleon from Moscow to Alexander in Petersburg.

== V ==
- Vereshchagin – Name of Moscow merchant and his son. Son accused of treason and scapegoated by Count Rostopchin for loss of Moscow to the French, whereupon he was mutilated by a mob.
- Prince Volkonsky (1776–1852) – Member of the Tsar's suite in 1812.
- Count Vyazmitinov (1744–1819)

== W ==
- General Weyrother (1755–1806) – Austrian general who replaced Schmidt. Developed the plan of attack at Austerlitz.
- Willarski – Pierre's sponsor, who delivers the formal invitation for him to join the Fraternity of Freemasons.
- General Wintzingerode (1770–1818) – German nobleman and officer in several different armies of the Napoleonic Wars.
- General Wolzogen (1773–1845) – Implementer of Pfuhl's plan in 1812.

== Y ==
- Captain Yakovlev – Bearer of a message from Napoleon in Moscow to Alexander in Petersburg.
- General Yermolov (1777–1861) – In Bagration's camp in 1812. Led an attack on Raevsky's redoubt as it was being overrun by the French. Later advised retreat from Fili that involved abandoning Moscow to the French.

== Z ==
- Zakhar – Count Rostov's coachman.
- Zdrzhinsky – an officer in the Russian army in 1812
- Zherkov – A cornet of hussars who mimicked a general. Prone to jest.
- Count Zhilinsky – Wealthy Polish count at Tilsit meeting of Napoleon and Alexander.
