= The Decembrists =

Unfinished novel by Leo Tolstoy

The Decembrists (Russian: Декабристы, Dekabristy) is an unfinished novel by Leo Tolstoy, who finished three chapters. Its hero was to have been a participant in the abortive Decembrist Uprising of 1825, released from Siberian exile after 1856. It was intended as a sequel to War and Peace, and the second part of a planned trilogy, whose third part would be set in 1856.

== Planning and early composition ==
In a letter to Herzen in 1861, Tolstoy spoke of shifting the focus of his writing back to previous historical eras:

In 1856, I began to write a tale with a certain theme, the hero of which was to have been a Decembrist returning with his family to Russia. Reluctantly I turned from the present to the year 1825, the epoch of my hero's mistakes and misfortunes, and abandoned what I had begun. But in 1825 my hero was already a grown-up family man. To understand him I had to go back to his youth, and his youth coincided with the epoch, glorious for Russia, of 1812. Once again I put aside my beginning, and started to write from the period of 1812.

The story was to contrast the physical and moral vitality of the returning Decembrist exiles with the decrepitude and artificiality of his contemporaries who had stayed in Moscow's "club society". Tolstoy's aim, however, was not just to idealize the Decembrists, but to present a balanced view, similar to his other work. The Pierre and Natasha Labazov of the Decembrists share characteristics with, and are clearly the prototypes of, the Pierre and Natasha Bezukhov that appear in War and Peace. Pierre is absent-minded and idealistic, while Natasha is calm and efficient. The early chapters deal with their arrival in Moscow and re-admittance into society. "Late on a winter's night of 1856 one of the 'criminals of 1825' returns 'to Moscow, to the heart of Russia ... after thirty-five years' exile and a journey lasting one and a half months' accompanied by his wife and their son and daughter who had been born and brought up in Siberia."

Geographically they had been transported three thousand miles into completely different, alien surroundings, but morally they were, this evening, still at home, just the same people as their special, long, secluded family life had made them. By tomorrow this would no longer be so.

== Termination of writing ==
During composition, Tolstoy decided to begin with what he saw as the roots of the Decembrist movement in the 1812 Napoleonic invasion of Russia. The result was his celebrated novel War and Peace, set between the years 1805 and 1820. Its final chapters carry the action up to the period of the Decembrists. It is known that he conducted research into the Decembrist movement with much the same thoroughness that he had approached the Napoleonic Wars. Tolstoy sought access to the Decembrists' court proceedings but was denied. This may have contributed to his abandonment of the process, though his wife attributed his inability to complete his novel on feelings of ambivalence. The finished chapters were first published in 1884.

== See also ==
English translation at:

- Fables for Children, Stories for Children, Natural Science Stories, Popular Education, Decembrists, Moral Tales at Project Gutenberg
