= Sonya (War and Peace) =

- War and Peace character
- Still of May Britt as Sonya in the 1956 film
- Created by: Leo Tolstoy
- Portrayed by: May Britt; Irina Gubanova; Joanna David; Aisling Loftus; Brittain Ashford; Maimuna Memon; Ingrid Michaelson

In-universe information
- Full name: Sofya Alexandrovna Rostova(?)
- Nicknames: Sonya, Sophie, Sonyushka
- Gender: Female
- Family: Vera Rostova, Nikolai Rostov, Natasha Rostova, Petya Rostov (cousins)
- Religion: Russian Orthodox
- Nationality: Russian

Sofya Alexandrovna "Sonya" (Russian: Софья Александровна "Соня"; French: Sophie) is a character in Leo Tolstoy's 1869 novel War and Peace, and in Sergey Prokofiev's 1955 opera War and Peace and Dave Malloy's 2012 musical Natasha, Pierre & the Great Comet of 1812 based on it. She is the orphaned niece of Count and Countess Rostov. Although sometimes called "Sonya Rostova," it is not clear if that is her surname or not; the novel does not say.

== Biography ==
At the start of the novel, 15-year-old Sonya is in love with her cousin, Nikolai Rostov, who initially reciprocates her feelings. Sonya has no independent means of support and Nikolai's mother opposes the match; Sonya and Nikolai swear eternal love before he leaves to fight in the war.

Nikolai returns home on leave with Dolokhov, a fellow soldier. Dolokhov is charmed by Sonya and proposes marriage. The countess encourages her to accept, but Sonya refuses. Natasha asks Nikolai to try to change her mind but she does not. She knows Nikolai no longer reciprocates her affection yet gives her own love freely and unconditionally.

Nikolai and Sonya rekindle their love when he returns from the war and they become engaged, much to the displeasure of the countess, who desires her son to marry a rich heiress. The countess accuses Sonya of ingratitude. Sonya is torn between her desire to be happy and her duty to sacrifice herself. Before this, she was conscious that her self-sacrifice elevated her in the eyes of others and improved her irreproachability in marrying Nikolai, her ultimate motive.

When Sonya hears that Nikolai has fallen in love with Princess Maria Bolkonskaya, she is deeply hurt, though she believes the countess is correct in thinking that the only solution to the family's financial troubles is Nikolai's marriage to the wealthy Princess Maria. Sonya hopes that Nikolai's pride will prevent the marriage; however, she eventually accepts it.

She is offered a place in Nikolai's new home where she dotes on his children. Nikolai and Maria accept Sonya although they feel guilty. Maria admits to Natasha that she is unfair to Sonya and Natasha explains that Sonya is "a sterile flower" and that although she had wished for Nikolai to marry her, she had a presentiment it would not happen. Natasha admits she is sorry for Sonya, but that Sonya is the kind of person who chooses to lose and is content in that role.

== See also ==
- List of characters in War and Peace
