= Nikolai Rostov =

- War and Peace character
- Created by: Leo Tolstoy
- Portrayed by: Jeremy Brett; Oleg Tabakov; Sylvester Morand; Jack Lowden

In-universe information
- Full name: Nikolai Ilyich Rostov
- Gender: Male
- Title: Count (Graf)
- Occupation: Cavalry officer, later a farmer
- Family: Ilya Rostov (father); Natalia Rostova (mother); Vera Rostova, Natasha Rostova (sisters); Petya Rostov (brother); Sonya Rostova (cousin)
- Spouse: Maria Bolkonskaya
- Children: Andrei, Mitya, and Natalia
- Nationality: Russian

Count Nikolai Ilyich Rostov (Russian: Николай Ильич Ростов) is a character in Leo Tolstoy's 1869 novel War and Peace.

Count Nikolai is the brother of Vera Rostova, Natasha Rostova and Petya Rostov. At the start of the novel, Nikolai is aged 20 and a university student. He gives up his studies in a zealous desire to serve his country as a Hussar in the fight against Napoleon's French invading forces. He dreams of manly success and glory in battle, although these dreams are somewhat undermined after he falls and is injured in the Battle of Schöngrabern. Nikolai is initially easily influenced and acts out of emotional responses; unlike his childhood friend, the social climber Boris Drubetskoy, who writer Dimitri Pisarev regarded "as the complete antithesis".

He refuses to use his family's contacts to improve his rank in the army, and comes under the influence of the libertine Dolokhov, losing large amounts of money to him at cards. Nikolai promises to marry his cousin Sonya but on his first leave home he pays no attention to her, and regularly goes to visit a courtesan. When Nikolai's friend Dolokhov proposes to Sonya and is rejected, Nikolai is easily led to financial ruin and social humiliation by Dolokhov, who manipulates him into again losing 43,000 Rubles at cards. Later, Sonya releases Nikolai from his promise to marry her. The book ends with his successful marriage to Maria Bolkonskaya and the couple's close friendship with Natasha and Pierre Bezukhov. Also, Nikolai's mother and Sonya live with him and his family at Bald Hills.

== See also ==
- List of characters in War and Peace
