= Sylvester Morand =

British actor (born between 1939 and 1941)

- Born: Between 1939 and 1941 (age 83–86); United States
- Citizenship: United States; United Kingdom
- Occupation: Actor
- Years active: 1966–present
- Spouse: Susan Engel (m. 1968)

Sylvester Morand (born between 1939–1941) is an American-born British actor, best known for his role as Nikolai Rostov in the BBC's 1972 dramatisation of War and Peace.

== Personal life ==
In January 1968, Morand married fellow actor Susan Engel. Morand's brother is the actor Timothy Morand.

== Filmography ==
=== Film ===
Year	Title	Role	Notes	Ref(s)
1973	And Now the Screaming Starts!			
1973	Managing Salesmen		Directed by Peter Duffell	
1977	The Brute	Alan	Directed by Gerry O'Hara	
1997	Up on the Roof	Professor	Film based on the 1987 musical	
2003	The League of Extraordinary Gentlemen	Old Traveler		
2005	Pride & Prejudice	Sir William Lucas		
2007	The Seeker: The Dark Is Rising	Vicar		
2009	Agora	Dignitary		

=== Television ===
Year	Title	Role	Notes	Ref(s)
1966	Out of the Unknown	Man servant	Series 2, Episode 11	
1967	Callan	Palanka	Series 3, Episode 2	
1968	Play of the Month	Paratrooper	Series 3, Episode 4	
1972	War and Peace	Nikolai Rostov	10 episodes	
1982	I Remember Nelson	Lord Byron		
1996	Gulliver's Travels	Archimedes		
2005	Fingersmith	Man in Carriage		

=== Stage ===
Year	Title	Role	Venue	Notes	Ref(s)
1990	The Last Days of Don Juan	Don Gonzalo of Ulloa	Swan Theatre, Stratford-upon-Avon	Directed by Danny Boyle	
2000	Albert Speer	Rudolf Hess	Royal National Theatre	Directed by Trevor Nunn	
