= Petya Rostov =

- War and Peace character
- Death of Petya Rostov, detail from Nikolay Karazin's 1893 painting
- Created by: Leo Tolstoy
- Portrayed by: Seán Barrett; Sergei Yermilov; Otto Farrant; Kit Connor

In-universe information
- Full name: Pyotr Ilyich Rostov
- Nickname: Petya
- Gender: Male
- Title: Count (Graf)
- Occupation: Soldier
- Family: Ilya Rostov (father); Natalia Rostova (mother); Nikolai Rostov (brother); Vera Rostova, Natasha Rostova (sisters); Sonya Rostova (cousin)
- Religion: Russian Orthodox
- Nationality: Russian

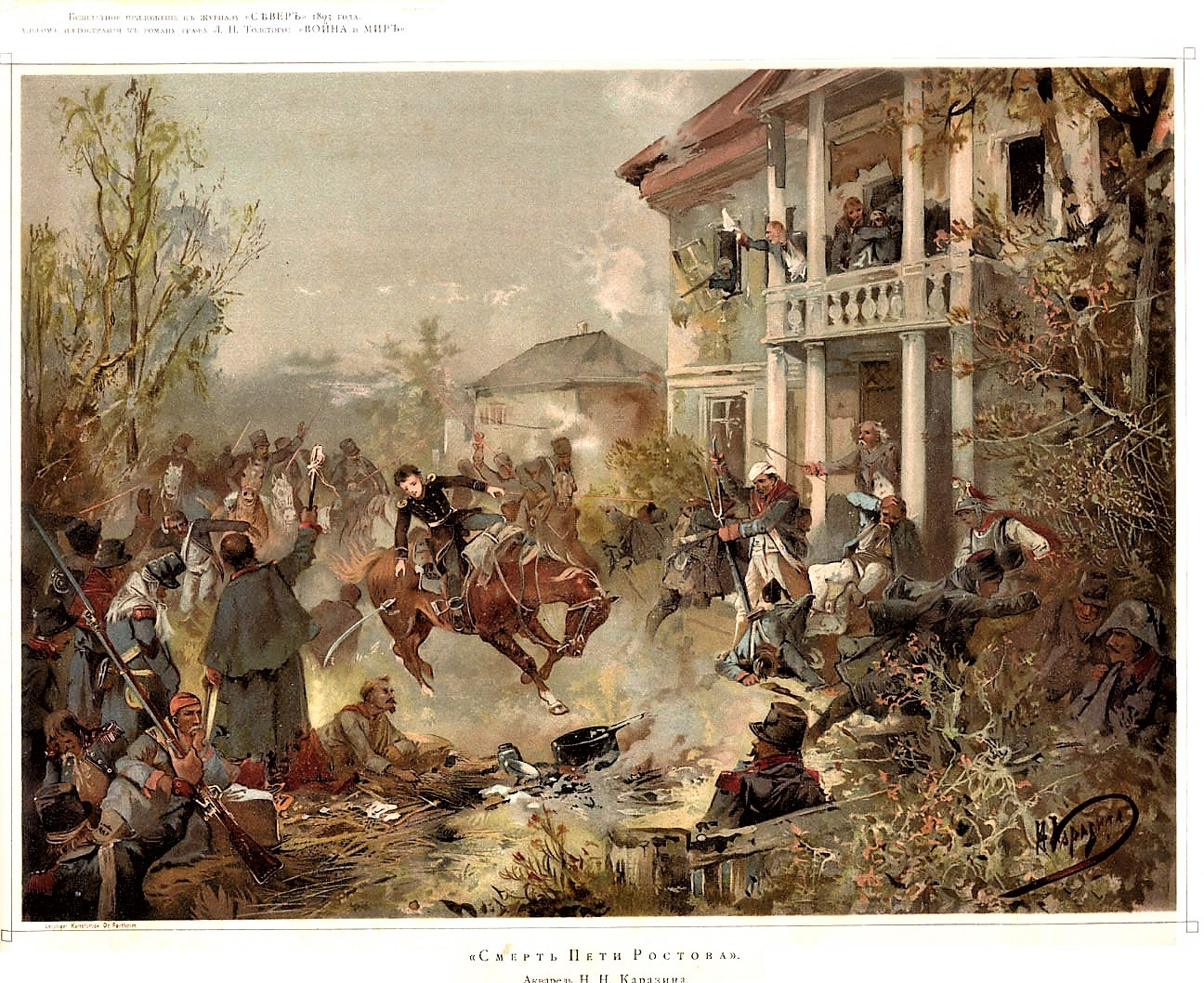
"The Death of Petya Rostov" (Nikolay Karazin, 1893)

Count Pyotr Ilyich "Petya" Rostov (1797–1812) is a character in Leo Tolstoy's 1869 novel War and Peace. The youngest member of the Rostov family, Petya is initially a minor character; however, towards the end of the novel, Petya's importance to the plot increases as he joins the Russian army in their defense against the French invasion of 1812. In the latter stages of the book Petya takes part in an attack on a French corps and is fatally wounded. This scene, along with the death of Prince Andrei Bolkonsky is one of the most famous (and shocking) in classical Russian literature.

== Reception ==
George R. Clay asserts that Tolstoy's "choice of fifteen-year old Petya Rostov as the one through whom to dramatize Moscow's response to the arrival of Emperor Alexander is masterful for the number of effects it accomplishes simultaneously".

== See also ==
- List of characters in War and Peace
