= Maria Bolkonskaya =

Character in the 1869 novel War and Peace

- War and Peace character
- Created by: Leo Tolstoy
- Portrayed by: Anna Maria Ferrero; Antonina Shuranova; Angela Down; Jessie Buckley; Gelsey Bell; Shaina Taub; Courtney Bassett; Chloe Saracco

In-universe information
- Full name: Maria Nikolaevna Bolkonskaya
- Nickname: Marie, Masha, Mary, Marya
- Gender: Female
- Title: Princess (kniazhna)
- Occupation: None; noblewoman
- Family: Nikolai Bolkonsky I (father); Andrei Bolkonsky (brother); Nikolai Bolkonsky II (nephew)
- Spouse: Nikolai Rostov
- Children: Andrey, Mitya, Natalia
- Religion: Russian Orthodox
- Nationality: Russian

Princess Maria Nikolaevna Bolkonskaya (Russian: Мария Николаевна Болконская, also Romanized Marya) is a fictional character in Leo Tolstoy's 1869 novel War and Peace.

Maria, the sister of Prince Andrei Bolkonsky, is a deeply religious young woman who has resigned herself to an unmarried life to be with her domineering father, Prince Nikolai Bolkonsky. Princess Maria is a plain woman, whose lack of beauty is offset by her large, caring eyes. She is overshadowed by her beautiful French companion, Mademoiselle Bourienne. An attempt to marry her off to the profligate Prince Anatole Kuragin fails.

Princess Maria's father dies during the days leading to the battle of Borodino. The peasants on her Bogucharovo estate threaten to become violent and Maria is rescued by Nikolai Rostov. They fall in love, but several situations keep them apart and eventually they both forgo any hope of marriage. Maria's brother, Prince Andrei Bolkonsky, is seriously wounded in battle and chances to fall under the care of Natasha Rostova, with whom Princess Maria becomes close friends after they witness Andrei Bolkonsky's death together. Maria marries the impoverished Nikolai Rostov in the winter of 1813, and eventually the couple have four children. Nikolai Rostov relies on his work and her moral support, not financial, to become a wealthy and content estate owner.

Stephen Vizinczey suggests that Tolstoy created Maria out of his longing for his mother, Princess Maria Nikolayevna Volkonskaya, who died before Tolstoy's second birthday.

== Title ==
The use of 'prince' and 'princess' in Russian novels is sometimes confusing to an English audience, who are accustomed to 'princesses' as the daughters of monarchs, or the wives of sovereign princes. In Eastern Europe, the title knyaz was anciently the chief of a Slavic tribe or ruler of a state; in 19th-century Russia, where War and Peace is set, the title knyaz was similar to, or above, a Western duke or a German Fürst, and it is conventionally translated as 'prince' even though the holder may not be descended from any sovereign. Maria Bolkonskaya is a kniazhna (daughter of a prince, viz. the knyaz Nikolai Bolkonsky), which is conventionally translated as 'princess'.

== See also ==
- List of characters in War and Peace
