= Natasha Rostova =

Character from Leo Tolstoy's War and Peace

- War and Peace character
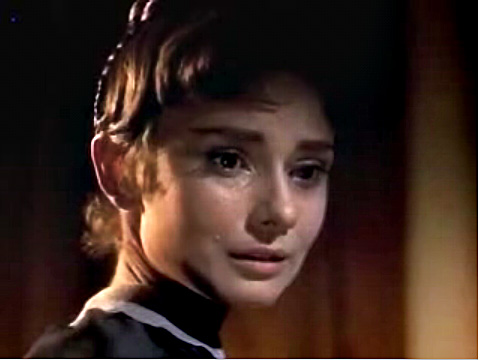
- Audrey Hepburn as Natasha, 1956
- Created by: Leo Tolstoy
- Portrayed by: Audrey Hepburn; Ludmila Savelyeva; Morag Hood; Clémence Poésy; Lily James; Phillipa Soo; Denée Benton; Lauren Zakrin; Shoba Narayan; Erika Ikuta; Bruna Guerin; Anna Netrebko; Ruzan Mantashyan; Chumisa Dornford-May

In-universe information
- Full name: Natalya Ilyinichna Rostova
- Nicknames: Natasha; Natalie
- Gender: Female
- Title: Countess (grafinya)
- Family: Ilya Rostov (father); Natalia Rostova (mother); Vera Rostova (sister); Nikolai Rostov, Petya Rostov (brothers); Sonya Rostova (cousin)
- Spouse: Pierre Bezukhov
- Children: Masha; Lisa; Petya; unnamed girl
- Religion: Russian Orthodox
- Nationality: Russian

Countess Natalya Ilyinichna "Natasha" Rostova (/iːljiːˈniːtʃ.nɑːˈ roʊ.stoʊˈvɑː/; Russian: Наталья "Наташа" Ильинична Ростова, named Natasha Rostov in the Rosemary Edmonds version; born 1792, according to the book) is a central fictional character in Leo Tolstoy's 1869 novel War and Peace. She is the beautiful daughter of Ilya Rostov, a loving, kind, and generous nobleman. Natasha is based on both Tanya Behrs, Tolstoy's sister-in-law, and Sophia Tolstaya (née Behrs), Tolstoy's wife.

== Biography ==
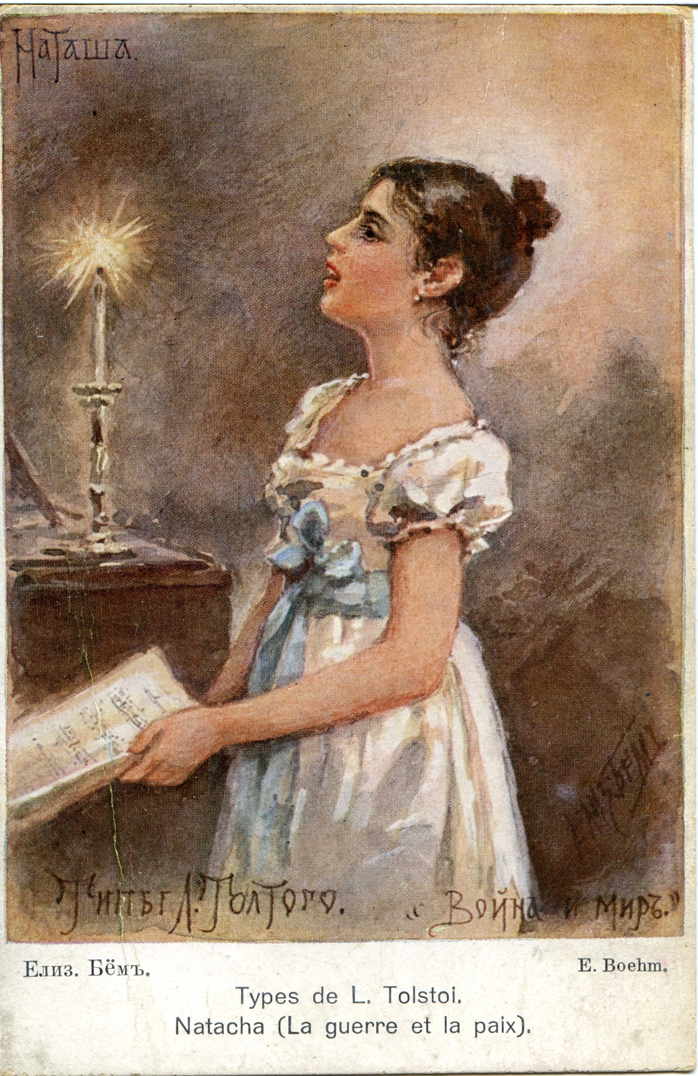
Natasha Rostova by Elisabeth Bohm

At the start of the novel in 1805, Natasha is a 13-year-old girl, the daughter of Count Ilya Rostov and Countess Natalya Rostova. She has fallen in love with young Prince Boris Drubetskoy, who lives with his mother Anna Mikhaylovna in the Rostov estate. She becomes close friends with Count Pierre Bezukhov, who frequently visits the Rostovs. When Boris leaves to pursue a career in the staff of General Mikhail Kutuzov, their friendship fades. At her first ball, Pierre introduces her to Prince Andrei Bolkonsky. They fall in love and become engaged, but Andrei's father objects to the match. He forces Andrei to postpone the marriage for a year, during which he goes on a tour of Europe and finds a tutor for his son. A visit to Andrei's father ends in a falling-out between Natasha and Princess Maria, Andrei's sister. During Andrei's absence, Prince Anatole Kuragin takes advantage of the situation by courting Natasha, even though he is already married. She succumbs to his charms and tries to elope with Kuragin. Although this is thwarted by Natasha's cousin Sonya, Natasha hastily writes to Princess Maria, breaking off the engagement. After her plan to elope is ruined, Natasha attempts suicide. She is rescued by the doctor before she dies. As Napoleon advances into Russia, the Rostovs are forced to evacuate their estate and retreat to their Moscow residence. When the Rostovs plan to evacuate Moscow, her parents use the carts for transportation of the wounded soldiers, and Natasha discovers that Andrei is also among the wounded soldiers. She devotes all her time to nursing him.

After the French forces depart Moscow, Natasha again meets Andrei's sister Maria and together they nurse Andrei until he dies. They are reunited with Pierre, whose estranged wife Helene has died. Natasha and Pierre fall in love. Eventually, they marry and have four children.

=== Adaptations ===
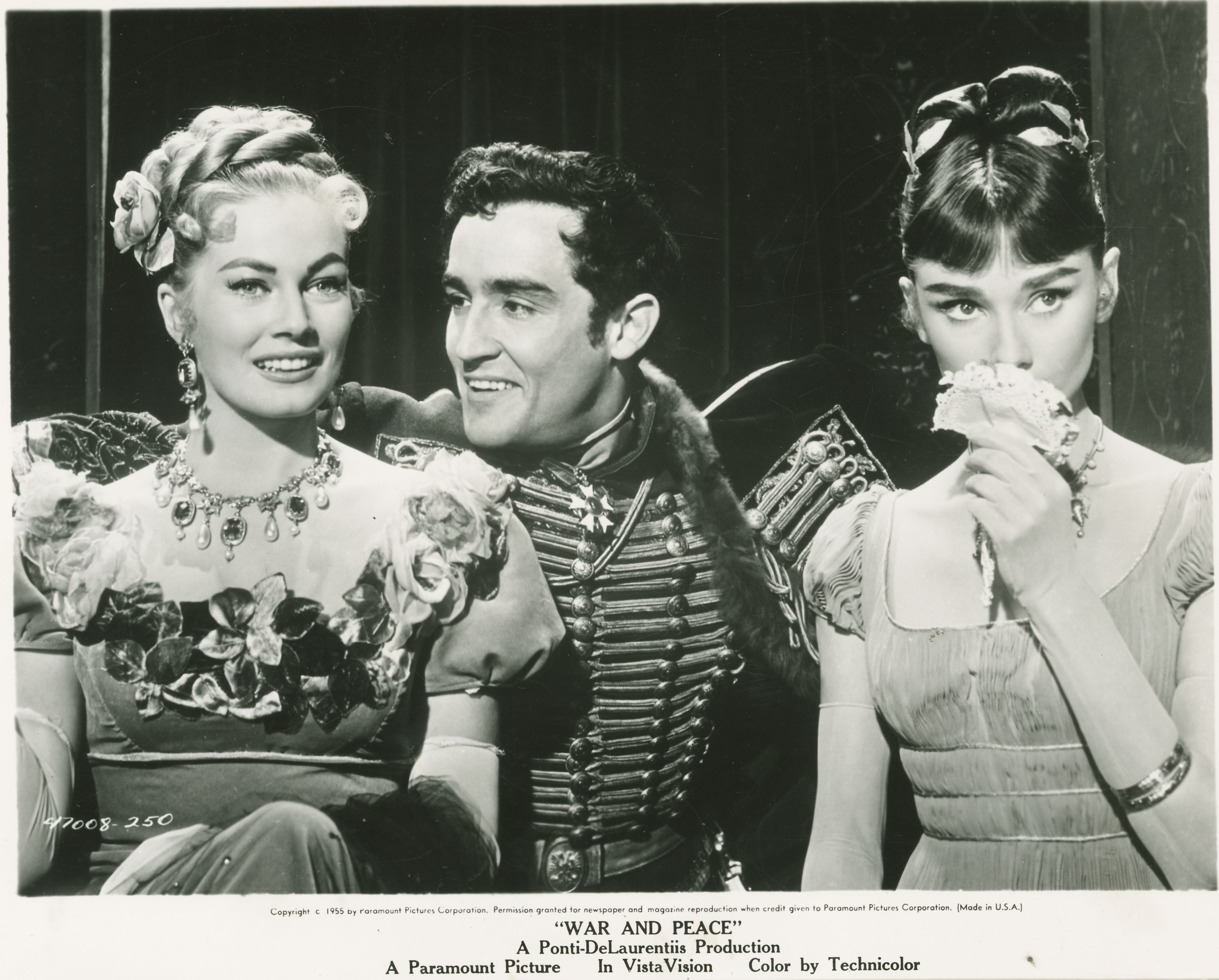
Publicity image for the 1956 film: Anita Ekberg as Hélène, Vittorio Gassman as Anatole, Audrey Hepburn as Natasha

The character of Natasha is difficult to portray on film or television because she ages from a 13-year-old girl in book one to a 28-year-old mother of four at the end of the novel. Several actresses have portrayed Natasha Rostova to critical acclaim.

In 1956, Audrey Hepburn was cast as Natasha in King Vidor's War and Peace. She was nominated for a BAFTA Award for best British actress and for a Golden Globe Award for best actress in a drama production. Moreover, Harlow Robinson writes that Hepburn "makes a visually compelling Natasha...".

Other performances include those of Morag Hood in the 1972 BBC miniseries with Anthony Hopkins as Pierre, Ludmila Savelyeva in Sergei Bondarchuk's adaptation, Clémence Poésy in the 2007 miniseries and Denée Benton (Phillipa Soo Off-Broadway) in the New York musical adaptation, Natasha, Pierre & The Great Comet of 1812, which received 12 Tony nominations in 2017. In the 2016 BBC One six-part drama based on the novel, Lily James played Natasha Rostova.

== Scholarly reception ==
The Encyclopedia of Literature remarks that Natasha "is undoubtedly Tolstoy's ideal woman," while the Academic American Encyclopedia describes her as "the embodiment of impulsiveness and spontaneity...". The transformation of her character towards the end of the novel from a joyous, spirited 'waif-like' beauty into a plump, rather slatternly woman who is only interested in her husband and children has been criticized. Dorothea Barrett compares this to the description of a matronly Dinah Morris at the end of Adam Bede, which she calls 'inappropriate, almost humiliating'.

== See also ==
- List of War and Peace characters
