= Lucas Steele =

American stage actor

- Born: June 29, 1979 (age 47); Wyalusing, Pennsylvania, U.S.
- Education: University of the Arts (BFA)
- Occupations: Actor, musician
- Years active: 2006–present
- Known for: Natasha, Pierre, & The Great Comet of 1812
- Awards: Lucille Lortel Award

Lucas Steele is an American stage actor, violinist and singer best known for his role as Anatole Kuragin in Natasha, Pierre & The Great Comet of 1812.

== Early life ==
Steele was raised in Wyalusing, Pennsylvania. He began learning piano by ear at age 3, and violin at age 11. He graduated from the University of the Arts with a BFA in Musical Theater.

== Career ==
Steele made his Broadway debut in the 2006 revival of The Threepenny Opera, playing the ensemble roles of Harry and Velma while understudying the role of Lucy Brown.

In the fall of 2006, Steele was signed to a four-year development deal for a commercial music project. For the next four years he focused on writing, producing, conceiving and developing a conceptualized electro/rock/pop album while traveling throughout Europe. While working on the album, Steele originated roles in the world premieres of Neil Bartlett's adaptation of Oliver Twist (presented by Theatre for a New Audience Off-Broadway in 2007) and It's Only Life (premiering at the Rubicon Theatre Company in Ventura in 2008).

In 2009, he returned to the West Coast, cast in Theatre for a New Audience's critically acclaimed production of Othello at the Intiman Theater in Seattle, WA.

In 2010, after participating in two years of developmental readings, Steele originated the role of Terry in The New Group production of The Kid, based on the best selling novel by writer/author/activist Dan Savage. After completing its run, Steele returned to Europe, entering the last chapter of the fated music project, ultimately leaving the deal in February 2011. Steele took the next year off to develop several screenplays as a writer.

In February 2012, Steele originated the role of "the Son" in the critically acclaimed production of Myths and Hymns, presented off-Broadway by the Prospect Theater Company.

In summer 2012, Steele was cast as Anatole in the Ars Nova developmental reading/workshop of Natasha, Pierre & The Great Comet of 1812, a sung-through musical based on a portion of Leo Tolstoy's magnum opus, War and Peace. He further developed the role in the show's premiere, and stayed with the production through its venues at Kazino, both downtown in the Meatpacking District and its transfer to midtown on 45th street. In 2015, Steele reprised the role of Anatole for the American Repertory Theatre production of The Great Comet, securing an IRNE Awards nomination for Supporting Actor and an Elliot Norton Awards nomination for Outstanding Musical Performance by an Actor. He continued with The Great Comet during its Broadway run at the Imperial Theatre, starting in November 2016.

In spring 2014, Steele booked the role of Luca Bavarra in the ABC pilot Dangerous Liaisons. Later that year, he shot the short film Photo.

At the time of the 2020 New York City theater shutdown amidst the COVID-19 pandemic, Steele was appearing as Skull, the primary antagonist in the musical Emojiland. The show which opened on Off-Broadway at the Duke Theater on January 19, 2020, had its imminent closing expedited by the coronavirus outbreak. Steele's portrayal of Skull was described by Laura Collins-Hughes in the New York Times as "deathly pale in black leather and mesh, and oozing an almost Victorian dark charisma."

In 2023, Steele starred in the premiere of The Romance of the Rose by American composer Kate Soper at Long Beach Opera, where he "lent his nimble voice and sly charm to The Dreamer," according to The New Yorker's Alex Ross. He reprised the role for the opera's studio album, which was released on New Focus in November 2024.

== Stage credits ==
=== Theatre credits ===
Year	Production	Role	Location	Category
2001-2002	My Fair Lady	Busker / Embassy Footman	Walnut Street Theatre	Regional
2005	Corpus Christi	Joshua	Bouwerie Lane Theater	Regional
2006	The Threepenny Opera	Ensemble / Harry / Velma u/s Lucy	Studio 54	Broadway
2007	Neil Bartlett's Oliver Twist	Toby Crackit	American Repertory Theatre	Regional
2008	John Bucchino's It's Only Life	Performer	Rubicon Theater in California	Regional
2009	Othello	Senator/Gentleman/Musician	Intiman Theatre	Regional
2010	The Kid	Terry	Acorn Theatre	Off-Broadway
2012	Myths and Hymns	Son/Performer	West End Theatre	Off-Broadway
2012	Natasha, Pierre, & The Great Comet of 1812	Anatole Kuragin	Ars Nova	Off-Off-Broadway
2013-2014	Natasha, Pierre, & The Great Comet of 1812	Anatole Kuragin	Kazino	Off-Broadway
2015-2016	Natasha, Pierre, & The Great Comet of 1812	Anatole Kuragin	American Repertory Theatre	Regional
2016–2017	Natasha, Pierre, & The Great Comet of 1812	Anatole Kuragin	Imperial Theatre	Broadway
2020	Emojiland	Skull	The Duke Theater	Off-Broadway
2023	The Romance of the Rose	The Dreamer	Long Beach Opera	Regional

== Awards and nominations ==
Year	Award	Category	Work	Result
2014	Lucille Lortel Award	Outstanding Featured Actor in a Musical	Natasha, Pierre, & The Great Comet of 1812	Won
2016	Elliot Norton Award	Outstanding Performance by an Actor	Natasha, Pierre, & The Great Comet of 1812	Nominated
2016	IRNE Award	Best Supporting Actor	Natasha, Pierre, & The Great Comet of 1812	Nominated
2017	Tony Award	Best Featured Actor in a Musical	Natasha, Pierre, & The Great Comet of 1812	Nominated
