= Natasha, Pierre & The Great Comet of 1812 =

Musical adaptation of Leo Tolstoy's War and Peace

Natasha, Pierre & the Great Comet of 1812
- The Great Comet
- Music: Dave Malloy
- Lyrics: Dave Malloy
- Book: Dave Malloy
- Setting: Moscow, Russia; 1812
- Basis: War and Peace by Leo Tolstoy
- Premiere: October 1, 2012: Ars Nova, New York City
- Productions: 2013 Off-Broadway; 2015 Massachusetts; 2016 Broadway; 2023 Linz (Austria; in German); 2024 London; 2026 Munich/München (in German)
- Awards: Richard Rodgers Award for Musical Theater

Natasha, Pierre & the Great Comet of 1812 (or simply The Great Comet) is a sung-through musical adaptation of a 70-page segment from Leo Tolstoy's 1869 novel War and Peace. The show was written by composer, lyricist, playwright, orchestrator Dave Malloy and originally directed by Rachel Chavkin. It is based on Volume II, Part V of Tolstoy's novel, focusing on Natasha's romance with Anatole and Pierre's search for meaning in his life.

The musical originally ran at the Ars Nova in 2012, followed by 2013 stagings in both the Meatpacking District and the Theater District of Manhattan, a 2014 Spanish-language staging in Quito, Ecuador, and a 2015 remounting at the American Repertory Theater in Cambridge, Massachusetts. The Great Comet premiered on Broadway in November 2016 at the Imperial Theatre, and closed in September 2017.

The original Off-Broadway production of the show had Phillipa Soo and Dave Malloy playing the roles of Natasha Rostova and Pierre Bezukhov respectively. Once the show was taken to Broadway, Denée Benton and Josh Groban made their Broadway debuts in the roles of Natasha and Pierre.

The musical received positive reviews, particularly for Phillipa Soo, Denée Benton, and Josh Groban's leading performances, as well as for the production's score, direction, and scenic design. The show was nominated for 12 awards – the highest number of nominations in the season – for the 2017 Tony Awards, including Best Musical, Best Original Score, Best Book of a Musical, Best Actress in a Musical for Benton, Best Actor in a Musical for Groban, Best Featured Actor in a Musical for Lucas Steele, and Best Direction of a Musical for Chavkin. It won two awards: Best Scenic Design for Mimi Lien and Best Lighting Design in a Musical for Bradley King.

== Synopsis ==
=== Act I ===
The musical starts in 1812, Moscow, Russia, by introducing the characters ("Prologue"). The audience is then introduced to Pierre Bezukhov, a depressed, unhappily married man who feels he is wasting his life ("Pierre"). He is a good friend of Andrey Bolkonsky, who is away fighting in the war. Andrey has recently become engaged to Natasha Rostova. Natasha and her cousin, Sonya Rostova, arrive in Moscow to visit Natasha's godmother, Marya Dmitrievna, and wait for Andrey to come home ("Moscow"). Natasha is to meet her future in-laws, Andrey's sister, the lonely Mary Bolkonskaya, and his father, the old Prince Bolkonsky, who are trapped in a hateful co-existence ("The Private and Intimate Life of the House"). However, their meeting ends in disaster, as Natasha finds Mary cold and Mary finds Natasha vain, with Bolkonsky behaving bizarrely and dismissing Natasha ("Natasha And Bolkonskys"). Natasha leaves, missing Andrey more than ever, and recalls the time they first met ("No One Else").

The next night, Natasha watches an opera with Sonya and Marya. Natasha catches the eye of Pierre's brother-in-law Anatole Kuragin, a notorious rogue and womaniser ("The Opera"). Anatole visits Natasha in her box to flirt and leaves her with feelings she has never experienced before ("Natasha And Anatole").

Anatole arrives home after the opera and goes out drinking with his friend, Fedya Dolokhov, and Pierre. They are met by Hélène Bezukhova, the unfaithfully promiscuous wife of Pierre and shamelessly suggestive sister of Anatole. Anatole lusts for Natasha, although it is revealed he is already married. Hélène flirts with Dolokhov, who taunts Pierre by raising a toast to "married women and their lovers". A drunk Pierre finds Dolokhov's behaviour insulting and challenges him to a duel. Pierre accidentally wounds Dolokhov, and Dolokhov, despite being a renowned crack shot, miraculously misses him. Before they all leave, Anatole asks Hélène to invite Natasha to a ball that evening, and she agrees ("The Duel"). They leave Pierre, who reflects on his near-death experience and realizes that despite wasting his life, he wishes to live and find love ("Dust And Ashes").

The next morning, as Natasha prepares for church, she is confused about her feelings for Anatole at the opera and questions whether they mean she has betrayed Andrey, fearing that something may prevent them from being together ("Sunday Morning"). Later that day, Hélène visits Natasha and invites her to the ball, praising her beauty, and Natasha agrees to attend. Hélène privately revels in the scandalous idea of her brother and Natasha getting together ("Charming").

That night at the ball, Natasha is met by Anatole, and they dance. Anatole professes his love to Natasha, who tries to tell him that she is already engaged. Ignoring this, Anatole kisses Natasha, leading her to fall in love with him in return ("The Ball").

=== Act II ===
After his duel with Dolokhov, Pierre begins studying to search for enlightenment. Natasha is further torn between her feelings for both Andrey and Anatole ("Letters"). Sonya discovers letters between Natasha and Anatole, learning of their relationship. She confronts Natasha and desperately explains her distrust of Anatole, but Natasha bursts out in anger at her and leaves. Natasha writes to Mary and breaks off her engagement with Andrey ("Sonya And Natasha"). Alone, Sonya reflects on her love for her cousin and her determination to save her, even if it means losing her closest friend ("Sonya Alone").

That evening, Anatole and Dolokhov prepare for the former's elopement with Natasha. Dolokhov attempts to change Anatole's mind, but is unsuccessful ("Preparations"). Balaga, their troika driver, arrives to take them to Natasha's house, where they will retrieve her before departing ("Balaga"). However, when they arrive at Natasha's house, their plan is thwarted at the last moment by Marya, who has discovered the plot ("The Abduction").

Marya scolds Natasha, who then reveals to Marya and Sonya that she broke off her engagement with Andrey and reaffirms her love for Anatole, whom she still believes is unmarried. Natasha screams at Marya and Sonya, bursting into tears as she waits all night for Anatole ("In My House"). Marya calls on Pierre in the middle of the night and explains the situation to him, begging him to handle the crisis. Pierre tells Marya that Anatole is already married ("A Call to Pierre"). Pierre, outraged, searches Moscow for Anatole while Marya and Sonya tell a grief-stricken Natasha that Anatole is already married. Pierre eventually finds Anatole at Hélène's house ("Find Anatole"). Pierre, close to violence, orders Anatole to leave Moscow and burn all his correspondence with Natasha. A terrified Anatole agrees, but manages to squeeze travelling money out of Pierre in the process ("Pierre And Anatole"). Natasha attempts to take her own life by poisoning herself with arsenic, but lives ("Natasha Very Ill").

The next day, Andrey returns home from the war and is disoriented about the refusal of marriage he received from Natasha, which he asks Pierre about. Pierre explains the scandal to him and pleads with him to be compassionate, but Andrey is unable to forgive Natasha and cold-heartedly tells Pierre that he will not ask for her hand in marriage again ("Pierre And Andrey"). Pierre visits a shattered Natasha, meeting her for the first time, and comforts her. During their conversation, he expresses that if he were the best man on Earth and were free, he would gladly marry her, giving her hope ("Pierre And Natasha"). After their meeting, Pierre experiences a moment of enlightenment as he watches the Great Comet of 1812 soar across the night sky ("The Great Comet Of 1812").

== Music ==
The score, written and orchestrated by Malloy, merges Russian folk and classical music with indie rock and EDM influences. The piece, described by Malloy as an "electropop opera," is sung-through, with just one line of spoken dialogue coming in Pierre and Natasha's only scene together. On stage, nearly all of the actors play musical instruments, augmenting the show's orchestra. Pierre plays the accordion briefly and plays large sections of the score on the orchestra's piano.

The libretto contains many passages taken word-for-word from Aylmer and Louise Maude's 1922 translation of Tolstoy's novel.

=== Musical numbers ===
Act I

1. "Prologue" – Full Company
2. "Pierre" – Pierre, Ensemble
3. "Moscow" – Marya, Natasha, Sonya
4. "The Private And Intimate Life Of The House" – Old Bolkonsky, Mary
5. "Natasha And Bolkonskys" – Mary, Natasha, Old Bolkonsky
6. "No One Else" – Natasha
7. "The Opera" – Marya, Sonya, Natasha, Hélène, Pierre, Anatole, Ensemble
8. "Natasha And Anatole" – Natasha, Anatole
9. "The Duel" – Anatole, Dolokhov, Pierre, Hélène, Servant, Ensemble
10. "Dust and Ashes" – Pierre, Ensemble
11. "Sunday Morning" – Natasha, Sonya, Marya
12. "Charming" – Hélène, Natasha
13. "The Ball" – Natasha, Anatole

Act II

14. "Letters" – Pierre, Natasha, Mary, Anatole, Dolokhov, Ensemble
15. "Sonya And Natasha" – Sonya, Natasha
16. "Sonya Alone" – Sonya
17. "Preparations" – Pierre, Anatole, Dolokhov
18. "Balaga" – Balaga, Anatole, Dolokhov, Ensemble
19. "The Abduction" – Anatole, Dolokhov, Pierre, Marya, Ensemble
20. "In My House" – Marya, Natasha, Sonya
21. "A Call to Pierre" – Marya, Pierre, Servant
22. "Find Anatole" – Pierre, Anatole, Hélène, Natasha, Servant, Ensemble
23. "Pierre And Anatole" – Pierre, Anatole
24. "Natasha Very Ill" – Sonya
25. "Pierre And Andrey" – Andrey, Pierre
26. "Pierre And Natasha" – Pierre, Natasha
27. "The Great Comet Of 1812" – Pierre, Ensemble

Note: An aria for Natasha, "Natasha Lost", was cut during the Broadway production but is included on the original cast recording between numbers 8 ("Natasha & Anatole") and 9 ("The Duel"). "Dust and Ashes" was added for the A.R.T. production. In 2020, Malloy released a song titled "Epilogue", a solo for Pierre after the finale that wasn't a part of the original musical.

== Productions ==
=== Off-Off-Broadway ===
==== Ars Nova ====
The musical premiered on October 16, 2012, at Ars Nova. Directed by Rachel Chavkin the show was staged as an immersive production, with action happening around and among the audience. The set designed by Mimi Lien and lights by Bradley King transformed Ars Nova into a Russian supper club. The creative team was completed by Paloma Young as costume designer, Matt Hubbs as sound designer, and Dave Malloy as musical director. The cast included Malloy as Pierre, Phillipa Soo as Natasha, Lucas Steele as Anatole, Amber Gray as Hélène, Brittain Ashford as Sonya, Manik Choksi as Dolokhov, Gelsey Bell as Mary, Amelia Workman as Marya, Blake DeLong as Andrey/Old Prince Bolkonsky and Paul Pinto (who also served as associate music director) as Balaga. The show was the first production of Ars Nova to ever transfer to Broadway.

=== Off-Broadway ===
==== Kazino ====
On May 16, 2013, the show opened in the Meatpacking District at Kazino, a temporary structure designed as an opulent Russian club, where the immersive production was staged, again by the same creative team. The cast reprised their roles, except Choksi, now replaced by Ian Lassiter (who temporarily took over the role for a month after which Choksi returned), and Workman, replaced by Grace McLean. Malloy left the cast on June 21 and was temporarily replaced by Luke Holloway. David Abeles then took over the role of Pierre on July 9, 2013. The show closed on September 1, 2013.

The show opened for a 14-week limited engagement starting on September 24, 2013, at the Kazino and moved to the Theater District, with the final cast of the previous production: Bell was replaced by Shaina Taub (Katrina Yaukey later took over the role from Taub on February 4) and Ashkon Davaran replaced Pinto. On December 10, 2013, the two-disc cast recording was released. The show was extended and ran until March 2, 2014.

=== American Repertory Theater (A.R.T.) ===
The team behind the original production remounted the show at the American Repertory Theater (A.R.T.) in Cambridge, Massachusetts, with performances beginning December 6, 2015, and running to January 3, 2016. Now expanded to a proscenium stage, the set put some of the audience onstage. Scott Stangland took over the role of Pierre, Denée Benton starred as Natasha, Lilli Cooper portrayed Hélène, and Nicholas Belton played Andrey/Old Prince Bolkonsky. The rest of the cast reprised their roles.

=== Broadway ===
The Broadway production at the Imperial Theatre began previews on October 18, 2016. It opened on November 14, 2016, starring Josh Groban as Pierre and Denée Benton as Natasha, both making their Broadway debuts. The remainder of the cast featured Lucas Steele as Anatole, Brittain Ashford as Sonya, Amber Gray as Hélène, Grace McLean as Marya, Manik Choksi as Dolokhov, Gelsey Bell as Princess Mary, Nicholas Belton as Andrey/Old Prince Bolkonsky, Paul Pinto as Balaga, and Scott Stangland as the standby for Pierre. The production had choreography by Sam Pinkleton, sets by Mimi Lien, costumes by Paloma Young, lights by Bradley King, sound by Nicholas Pope, and music direction by Or Matias. With sets similar to the A.R.T. remounting, the production took the proscenium stage, but removed almost 200 seats from the audience to accommodate the design. Again, options for stage seats, in banquettes, or dining tables were available. The Broadway production cost about $14 million to stage, most of which was not recouped. In July 2017, Hamilton alum Okieriete Onaodowan took over the role of Pierre, singer-songwriter Ingrid Michaelson took over the role of Sonya and Courtney Bassett took over the role of Princess Mary, both for temporary engagements. On August 15, Stangland temporarily took over the role of Pierre, and Ashford returned to the role of Sonya. On August 22, Bell returned to the role of Princess Mary, and Dave Malloy took over the role of Pierre for the remainder of the Broadway run.

The Broadway production played its final performance on September 3, 2017, having run for 32 previews and 336 regular performances.

=== London ===
On 25 June 2024, it was announced that The Great Comet would have its United Kingdom premiere at London's Donmar Warehouse from 9 December 2024 to 8 February 2025. The show was directed by Timothy Sheader and choreographed by Ellen Kane. Sheader said this production would return the show to its Ars Nova roots, with a cast of 12 and band of 10 (as opposed to the Broadway edition, which had a cast of 33). On 17 October, the cast was announced with Jamie Muscato, Declan Bennett and Chumisa Dornford-May starring as Anatole, Pierre and Natasha, respectively. Also featured in the cast are Cedric Neal as Balaga, Daniel Krikler as Dolokhov, Eugene McCoy as Prince Bolkonsky/Andrey, Annette McLaughlin as Marya, Maimuna Memon as Sonya, Cat Simmons as Hélène and Chloe Saracco as Princess Mary.

The production officially opened on 16 December to rave reviews, with critics particularly praising the strength of the cast and the originality of the material. The production closed on 8 February and was nominated for six Laurence Olivier Awards and won for Best Actress in a Supporting Role in a Musical for Memon.

=== United States Regional ===
Tantrum Theater, the professional theatre attached to Dave Malloy's alma mater Ohio University, staged the regional and university premiere of the show from March 24 to April 2, 2022. Carnegie Mellon University, the alma mater of original Broadway stars Josh Groban and Denée Benton, staged the second university production shortly after from April 14-26, 2022.

The Capital City Theatre of Madison, Wisconsin staged the musical from June 3–12, 2022. The West Coast premiere occurred in the fall of 2022 with the Shotgun Players in Berkeley, California.

The Great Comet returned to the Loeb Drama Center, home of the American Repertory Theater (A.R.T.) in Cambridge, Massachusetts, under the Harvard-Radcliffe Dramatic Club in April 2023.

The Pittsburgh Civic Light Opera staged the musical from August 22-27, 2023 featuring Jason Gotay as Anatole and Great Comet Broadway replacement Kennedy Caughell as Sonya. The Idaho Shakespeare Festival also staged the show during this month.

The Great Lakes Theater, Cleveland, Ohio, staged The Great Comet in September and October 2023 with Chris McCarrell as Anatole.

The Horizon Theatre Company, Atlanta, Georgia, staged The Great Comet in October and November 2023. The production returned for two encore runs from January 26 to March 3, 2024 and January 24 to February 23, 2025.

The Zach Theatre in Austin, Texas, staged The Great Comet in January–March 2024.

The Arvada Center for the Arts and Humanities in Arvada, Colorado staged The Great Comet in February–March 2024.

Seacoast Repertory Theatre, Portsmouth, New Hampshire, staged The Great Comet in March and April 2024.

Cygnet Theatre, San Diego, California, staged The Great Comet in April and May 2024.

Pioneer Theatre Company, Salt Lake City, Utah, staged The Great Comet in May 2024 starring Ali Ewoldt as Natasha and Kevin Earley as Pierre

Writers Theatre of Glencoe, Illinois, staged The Great Comet from September through November 2024 starring Aurora Penepacker as Natasha and Evan Tyrone Martin as Pierre.

=== International ===
The show had its international premiere in Quito, Ecuador, in September 2014, in a Spanish-language production produced by Teatro Parapluie.

A Brazilian production opened in August 2018, in Portuguese, with Bruna Guerin as Natasha, André Frateschi as Pierre, and Gabriel Leone as Anatole. The production won the Prêmio Reverência popular vote Award for "Best Musical."

A Japanese production, helmed by the entertainment company Toho, opened at the Tokyo Metropolitan Theatre on January 5, 2019, and ran through January 27, 2019. It starred Nogizaka46's Erika Ikuta Natasha and Yoshio Inoue as Pierre.

The Korean production ran from March 2021 until May 2021, starring Haena and Jung Eun-ji as Natasha, and Hong Kwang-ho and K.Will as Pierre. In 2024, the production returned to Korea featuring Lee Jisoo, Yoo Yeon-jung, and Park Soobin as Natasha, and Ha Do-kwon, K.Will, and Julian Jootaek Kim as Pierre.

Variety also reported that productions in London and Korea were under discussion, with additional interest in China and the Philippines.

The Canadian premiere produced by Musical Stage Co. and Crow's Theatre was set to run from January 26 to February 14, 2021, at the Winter Garden Theatre in Toronto, but was suspended due to the COVID-19 pandemic and consequent shutdown of theaters. It was rescheduled for December 5, 2023 to March 24, 2024, at the Crow's Theatre. In summer 2025, it transferred to the Royal Alexandra Theatre. Elsewhere in Canada, MacEwan University mounted the Western-Canada premiere production from February 12–16, 2025.

The European premiere was in February 2023 at the Landestheater in Linz, Austria.

The Australian premiere was mounted by the Darlinghurst Theatre, running at the Eternity Playhouse from 7 July to 20 August 2023. Reviews were positive, citing the staging and diverse casting.

The Chinese premiere ran from December 2023 to March 2024 at the Nine Trees Future Art Center and the Bank of Communications Qiantan 31 Performing Arts Center with Cooper Grodin starring as Pierre.

A New Zealand production, produced by WITCH Music Theatre, opened at the Hannah Playhouse Theatre, Wellington in April 2024.

The Great Comet is set to return to China at the Shanghai Grand Theatre from May 15 to 24, 2026 as a staged concert with Cooper Grodin reprising his role opposite Grace Mouat.

The first production in Germany was staged by Bayerische Theaterakademie August Everding at the Prinzregententheater in Munich. It ran from November 13 to 21, 2026 (6 performances).

== Characters ==
Character	Description
Countess Natasha Rostova	"Natasha is young": A nineteen-year-old ingenue who is innocent, doe-eyed, and profoundly, lethally romantic. She is betrothed to Andrey and loves him dearly. She goes to Moscow under the care of her godmother, Marya D., with her cousin and best friend Sonya. During her first three days there, she meets Anatole Kuragin and falls in love with him.
Pierre Bezukhov	"Dear, bewildered, and awkward Pierre... rich, unhappily married Pierre": The illegitimate son of a Russian aristocratic family. Socially awkward with a melancholy streak, he is an outsider in society despite his wealth. He is a good friend of Andrey and keeps an eye on Natasha for him while he is away at war.
Anatole Kuragin	"Anatole is hot": An aristocratic, seductive hedonist, who "spends his money on women and wine," and sees no needs except his own. He is the brother of Hélène and a friend of Dolokhov. During the show, he meets Natasha at the Opera and immediately wants her, despite her engagement and his already being married to a woman in Poland.
Sonya Rostova	"Sonya is good, Natasha's cousin and closest friend": She is fiercely dedicated to her cousin and will do anything and everything to keep her safe.
Marya Dmitriyevna Akhrosimova	"Marya is old-school, a grand dame of Moscow": She is Natasha's godmother, an old friend of Pierre, and a very strict but kind woman. Natasha and Sonya live with her during their time in Moscow. She loves Natasha very much and tries to help and protect her, especially when Natasha makes the mistake of falling for Anatole and breaks off her engagement with Andrey.
Hélène Kuragina Bezukhova	"Hélène is a slut": Anatole's sister, who married Pierre for money. She is highly sexualized and dedicated to her brother.
Fedya Dolokhov	"Dolokhov is fierce, but not too important": An extremely talented marksman. He is Anatole's closest friend and participates in his pleasure-loving lifestyle. He is having an alleged affair with Hélène.
Prince Andrey Bolkonsky	"Andrey isn't here": He is a good friend of Pierre and betrothed to Natasha. He is fighting in the war for much of the show. He is serious and bitter.
Old Prince Nikolay Bolkonsky	"Old Prince Bolkonsky is crazy": and suffering from many age-related ailments. He is taken care of by his daughter Mary, but he torments her regardless.
Princess Mary Bolkonskaya	"Mary is plain": the daughter of Bolkonsky and Andrey's sister. She lives at home with her father as his carer, where she is tormented and abused by him. She is confined to the house and has no friends.
Balaga	"Balaga's just for fun": He's a famous troika driver, and assists Anatole in his plot for eloping with Natasha. He is wild and mystical.

(Lines in quotations are lyrics from the opening song, "Prologue," which introduces the characters)

== Original principal casts ==
Character	Ars Nova	Off-Broadway	Broadway	Shanghai	Off-West End	Toronto
Character	2012	2013	2016	2023	2024	2025
Natasha Rostova	Phillipa Soo	Phillipa Soo	Denée Benton	Naomi Kiana Gomez	Chumisa Dornford-May	Hailey Gillis
Pierre Bezukhov	Dave Malloy	Dave Malloy	Josh Groban	Cooper Grodin	Declan Bennett	Evan Buliung
Anatole Kuragin	Lucas Steele	Lucas Steele	Lucas Steele	Dean Cestari	Jamie Muscato	George Krissa
Sonya Rostova	Brittain Ashford	Brittain Ashford	Brittain Ashford	Yuting Chen	Maimuna Memon	Vanessa Sears
Marya Dmitriyevna Akhrosimova	Amelia Workman	Grace McLean	Grace McLean	Kaye Tuckerman	Annette McLaughlin	Louise Pitre
Hélène Bezukhova	Amber Gray	Amber Gray	Amber Gray	Bex Odorisio	Cat Simmons	Divine Brown
Fedya Dolokhov	Manik Choksi	Manik Choksi	Manik Choksi	Ethan Saviet	Daniel Krikler	Lawrence Libor
Andrey Bolkonsky	Blake DeLong	Blake DeLong	Nicholas Belton	Apollo Ziegfeld	Eugene McCoy	Marcus Nance
Old Prince Bolkonsky	Blake DeLong	Blake DeLong	Nicholas Belton	Apollo Ziegfeld	Eugene McCoy	Marcus Nance
Princess Mary Bolkonskaya	Gelsey Bell	Gelsey Bell	Gelsey Bell	Noa Luz Barenblat	Chloe Saracco	Heeyun Park
Balaga	Paul Pinto	Paul Pinto	Paul Pinto	Damon J. Gillespie	Cedric Neal	Andrew Penner

=== Notable replacements ===
==== Off-Broadway (2013-14) ====
- Pierre Bezukhov: David Abeles
- Princess Mary: Shaina Taub

==== Broadway (2016-17) ====
- Pierre Bezukhov: Dave Malloy, (Note: Dave Malloy alternated in the role with Josh Groban as Pierre from May 4 to June 27 and portrayed the role as principal actor from July 3 to 9. He portrayed the role for the final 2 weeks of the run from August 22 to September 3.) Okieriete Onaodowan, (Note: Okieriete Onaodowan took over the role of Pierre from Dave Malloy on July 11, 2017. He was originally contracted to star until September 3. However, his run ended early on August 13.) Scott Stangland (Note: After performing the role at the American Repertory Theatre, Scott Stangland served as the Pierre standby from the Broadway opening to August 13. He then took over the role from Onaodowan as principal actor from August 15 to 20, 2017. He then continued serving as the standby, performing twice before the show came to a close.)
- Sonya Rostova: Ingrid Michaelson (Note: Ingrid Michaelson temporarily replaced Brittain Ashford as Sonya from July 4 through August 13. Ashford returned to the role on August 15.)

== Critical response ==
Charles Isherwood in The New York Times called it "a vibrant, transporting new musical," and both Times theater critics included the show on their Best of the Year lists. The Times' classical critic, Anthony Tommasini, called it "a breathless, roughish and ravishing quasi-opera. This is a pastiche score of a cavalier sort. Mr. Malloy lifts styles with such abandon, making willful shifts – from punk riffs to agitated Broadway ballads, mock-pompous recitative to gritty Russian folk or drinking wine with klezmer clarinets – that you lose track of what is being appropriated and really don't care." Time Out New York gave the piece five out of five stars, and also included it on both critics' Best of lists, stating "this is theater like no other in New York. It grounds you and transports you at once, and leaves you beaming with pleasure."

Marilyn Stasio of Variety wrote that "Malloy, who wrote the marvelous book, tuneful music, and smart lyrics, understands and even admires the members of this aristocratic society, who in ensemble songs like “The Opera” and “Letters” reveal themselves as irresistibly charming and hopelessly corrupt."

Matt Windham in AmNewYork described it as "extremely uneven, with a stop-and-start momentum that alternates between all-out liveliness and long episodes of slow tedium", but praised the cast and production. Leah Greenblatt of Entertainment Weekly praised its "remarkable" staging but wrote that the overarching plot lacked weight. Jesse Green in Vulture wrote that "it seems like an example of elitist decadence rather than the condemnation of it that Tolstoy intended."

Mark Kennedy of Associated Press considered the songwriting uneven and called the play "best for people who want to say they experienced a cool immersive experience on Broadway, but one without any heart. It’s pure showmanship with none of the emotional payoff." Jeremy Gerard of Deadline expressed similar criticism, writing that "delivers pleasure for the eye and, intermittently, the ear. But not for the soul. Not for a moment did I feel engaged with Natasha’s love issues or Pierre’s existential crisis."

Chris Jones, the drama critic for the Chicago Tribune, wrote that the play did not adequately explore "the emotional inner lives of the characters" and that the majority of the characters were unconvincing with the exception of Groban's Pierre. Robert Hofler of TheWrap criticized the play for its abrupt ending which omits some story beats from the novel but praised the orchestration and staging.

David Rooney of The Hollywood Reporter praised it, writing that it "arrives on Broadway in superlative shape, its humor, emotional content and rip-roaring storytelling every bit as vibrant as its madly infectious score." Robert Kahn of NBC New York wrote that the play "will be lauded for its innovative and transformative approach to storytelling".

== Onaodowan/Patinkin controversy ==
Josh Groban played his final performance in the Broadway production on July 2, 2017. Okieriete Onaodowan assumed the role of Pierre on July 11; he was supposed to begin performances on July 3 but needed more time to prepare. The show's creator and former Pierre, Dave Malloy, played the role from July 3 to 9. Onaodowan's performance was well received, but the show continued to struggle financially with the departure of Groban. The producers attempted to bring in Broadway legend Mandy Patinkin to boost ticket sales and prevent the show from closing. On July 26, 2017, a day before the official announcement, the website Broadway Black broke the news that Patinkin was set to replace Onaodowan as Pierre for three weeks, cutting Onaodowan's run short by a couple of weeks due to Patinkin's busy schedule.

Many fans and actors were angered by this casting decision as Patinkin, a white man, replaced Onaodowan. A Twitter campaign was begun by Rafael Casal, a friend of Onaodowan's, who coined the hashtag #makeroomforoak. Patinkin withdrew from the show two days later, stating: "I hear what members of the community have said and I agree with them. I am a huge fan of Oak ... and I will, therefore, not be appearing in the show." Pierre standby Scott Stangland played Pierre for the first week after Onaodowan's departure. Malloy then assumed the role of Pierre for the remainder of the run. The show closed a little over a month later, on September 3, 2017, citing this controversy and declining ticket sales.

== Awards and nominations ==
=== Original Off-Broadway production ===
Sources: TheaterMania Internet Off-Broadway DatabaseVillage Voice

Year	Award	Category	Nominee	Result
2013	Obie Award	Special Citations	Dave Malloy & Rachel Chavkin	Won
2013	Drama League Award	Distinguished Performance Award	Phillipa Soo	Nominated
2013	Drama League Award	Outstanding Production of a Broadway or Off-Broadway Musical		Nominated
2013	Drama Desk Award	Outstanding Musical		Nominated
2013	Drama Desk Award	Outstanding Music	Dave Malloy	Nominated
2013	Drama Desk Award	Outstanding Lyrics	Dave Malloy	Nominated
2013	Drama Desk Award	Outstanding Director of a Musical	Rachel Chavkin	Nominated
2013	Drama Desk Award	Outstanding Costume Design	Paloma Young	Nominated
2013	Off-Broadway Alliance Awards	Best New Musical		Won
2014	Lucille Lortel Award	Outstanding Musical		Nominated
2014	Lucille Lortel Award	Outstanding Director	Rachel Chavkin	Nominated
2014	Lucille Lortel Award	Outstanding Lead Actress in a Musical	Phillipa Soo	Nominated
2014	Lucille Lortel Award	Outstanding Featured Actor in a Musical	Lucas Steele	Won
2014	Lucille Lortel Award	Outstanding Featured Actor in a Musical	Blake DeLong	Nominated
2014	Lucille Lortel Award	Outstanding Featured Actress in a Musical	Brittain Ashford	Nominated
2014	Lucille Lortel Award	Outstanding Featured Actress in a Musical	Shaina Taub	Nominated
2014	Lucille Lortel Award	Outstanding Scenic Design	Mimi Lien	Won
2014	Lucille Lortel Award	Outstanding Costume Design	Paloma Young	Won
2014	Lucille Lortel Award	Outstanding Lighting Design	Bradley King	Nominated
2014	Lucille Lortel Award	Outstanding Sound Design	Matt Hubbs	Nominated

=== Original Cambridge production ===
Year	Award	Category	Nominee	Result
2016	Elliot Norton Award	Outstanding Musical Production by a Large Theatre		Won
2016	Elliot Norton Award	Outstanding Design, Large Theatre		Won
2016	Elliot Norton Award	Outstanding Director, Large Theatre	Rachel Chavkin	Won
2016	Elliot Norton Award	Outstanding Performance by an Actor	Lucas Steele	Nominated
2016	Elliot Norton Award	Outstanding Performance by an Actor	Scott Stangland	Won
2016	Elliot Norton Award	Outstanding Performance by an Actress	Denée Benton	Nominated
2016	Elliot Norton Award	Outstanding Ensemble, Large Theatre		Nominated
2016	IRNE Awards	Outstanding New Play		Won
2016	IRNE Awards	Best Set Design	Mimi Lien	Won
2016	IRNE Awards	Best Costume Design	Paloma Young	Won
2016	IRNE Awards	Best Lighting Design	Bradley King	Won
2016	IRNE Awards	Best Sound Design	Matt Hubbs	Won
2016	IRNE Awards	Best Actor in a Musical	Scott Stangland	Won
2016	IRNE Awards	Best Actress in a Musical	Denée Benton	Nominated
2016	IRNE Awards	Best Supporting Actress in a Musical	Brittain Ashford	Nominated
2016	IRNE Awards	Best Supporting Actor in a Musical	Lucas Steele	Nominated
2016	IRNE Awards	Best Director of a Musical	Rachel Chavkin	Won
2016	IRNE Awards	Best Musical		Won

=== Original Broadway production ===
Year	Award	Category	Nominee	Result
2017	Tony Awards	Best Musical		Nominated
2017	Tony Awards	Best Book of a Musical	Dave Malloy	Nominated
2017	Tony Awards	Best Original Score	Dave Malloy	Nominated
2017	Tony Awards	Best Orchestrations	Dave Malloy	Nominated
2017	Tony Awards	Best Actor in a Musical	Josh Groban	Nominated
2017	Tony Awards	Best Actress in a Musical	Denée Benton	Nominated
2017	Tony Awards	Best Featured Actor in a Musical	Lucas Steele	Nominated
2017	Tony Awards	Best Scenic Design in a Musical	Mimi Lien	Won
2017	Tony Awards	Best Costume Design in a Musical	Paloma Young	Nominated
2017	Tony Awards	Best Lighting Design in a Musical	Bradley King	Won
2017	Tony Awards	Best Direction of a Musical	Rachel Chavkin	Nominated
2017	Tony Awards	Best Choreography	Sam Pinkleton	Nominated
2017	Drama Desk Awards	Outstanding Director of a Musical	Rachel Chavkin	Won
2017	Drama Desk Awards	Outstanding Set Design	Mimi Lien	Won
2017	Drama Desk Awards	Outstanding Lighting Design for a Musical	Bradley King	Won
2017	Drama Desk Awards	Outstanding Sound Design in a Musical	Nicholas Pope	Won
2017	Drama League Award	Outstanding Production of a Broadway or Off-Broadway Musical		Nominated
2017	Drama League Award	Distinguished Performance Award	Denée Benton	Nominated
2017	Drama League Award	Distinguished Performance Award	Josh Groban	Nominated
2017	Outer Critics Circle Award	Outstanding Set Design	Mimi Lien	Won
2017	Outer Critics Circle Award	Outstanding Lighting Design	Bradley King	Won
2017	Outer Critics Circle Award	Outstanding Sound Design	Nicholas Pope	Nominated
2017	Theatre World Award		Denée Benton	Honoree
2017	Theatre World Award		Josh Groban	Honoree
2017	Theatre World Award		Amber Gray	Honoree
2017	Theatre World Award		Dave Malloy	Special Award Honoree
2017	Chita Rivera Awards for Dance and Choreography	Outstanding Ensemble in a Broadway Show		Won
2017	Actors' Equity Association Special Award	ACCA Award for Outstanding Broadway Chorus	Sumayya Ali, Courtney Bassett, Josh Canfield, Kennedy Caughell, Ken Clark, Erica Dorfler, Lulu Fall, Ashley Pérez Flanagan, Paloma Garcia-Lee, Nick Gaswirth, Alex Gibson, Billy Joe Kiessling, Mary Spencer Knapp, Blaine Alden Krauss, Reed Luplau, Brandt Martinez, Andrew Mayer, Mary Page Nance, Shoba Narayan, Azudi Onyejekwe, Pearl Rhein, Celia Mei Rubin, Heath Saunders, Ani Taj, Cathryn Wake, Katrina Yaukey, Lauren Zakrin	Recipient
2017	Actors' Equity Association Special Award	Extraordinary Excellence in Diversity		Recipient
2017	Smithsonian Ingenuity Award	History Award	Dave Malloy & Rachel Chavkin	Won

=== Original London production ===
Year	Award	Category	Nominee	Result
2025	Laurence Olivier Awards	Best New Musical		Nominated
2025	Laurence Olivier Awards	Best Actress in a Musical	Chumisa Dornford-May	Nominated
2025	Laurence Olivier Awards	Best Actor in a Musical	Jamie Muscato	Nominated
2025	Laurence Olivier Awards	Best Actress in a Supporting Role in a Musical	Maimuna Memon	Won
2025	Laurence Olivier Awards	Outstanding Musical Contribution	Dave Malloy and Nicholas Skilbeck	Nominated
2025	Laurence Olivier Awards	Best Lighting Design	Howard Hudson	Nominated

== Recordings ==
On December 10, 2013, Ghostlight Records released a two-disc cast album of the entire score. The cast featured Dave Malloy as Pierre, Phillipa Soo as Natasha, Lucas Steele as Anatole, Brittain Ashford as Sonya, Manik Choksi as Dolokhov, Grace McLean as Marya D, Amber Gray as Hélène, Blake DeLong as Andrey/Old Prince Bolkonsky, Gelsey Bell as Princess Mary, and Paul Pinto as Balaga. Later, another disc containing highlights from the show was released.

The original Broadway cast recording was released on May 19, 2017, on Reprise Records. It went on to chart at number 87 on the Billboard 200 chart, number 26 on the Top Album Sales chart, and number 23 on the Digital Albums chart.

== Book ==
On November 22, 2016, the book Natasha, Pierre, and the Great Comet of 1812: The Journey of a New Musical to Broadway was released. The book, edited and compiled by Steven Suskin, includes interviews with many of the original cast members, as well as the annotated script and photos of both the Kazino and Broadway casts. The book also includes a CD with five songs from the show: three from the original cast recording and two featuring Josh Groban and a 25-piece orchestra.
