= War and Peace (2007 miniseries) =

- Genre: Drama
- Based on: War and Peace by Leo Tolstoy
- Screenplay by: Lorenzo Favella; Enrico Medioli; Gavin Scott
- Directed by: Robert Dornhelm
- Composer: Jan A.P. Kaczmarek
- Countries of origin: France, Italy, Russia
- Original languages: French, Italian, Russian, German

Production
- Producers: Julio Ariza; Luca Bernabei; Matilde Bernabei; Ferdinand Dohna; Chris Grabowski; Slawomir Jozwik; Fania Petrocchi; Sergey Shumakov; Nicolas Traube
- Cinematography: Fabrizio Lucci
- Running time: 394 minutes

Original release
- Network: Rai 1, RTBF, France 2
- Release: 19 October 2007

War and Peace (French: Guerre et Paix, Italian: Guerra e pace) is a 2007 French-Italian drama miniseries directed by Robert Dornhelm. It was broadcast in Italy (Rai 1), Belgium (RTBF), in France (France 2) and in Russia (Telekanal Rossiya) in four parts during October and November 2007. It was inspired by Leo Tolstoy's 1869 novel War and Peace, which also is divided into four parts. The actors are of different nationalities.

== Cast ==
- Alexander Beyer as Pierre Bezukhov
- Clémence Poésy as Natasha Rostova
- Alessio Boni as Andrei Bolkonsky
- Malcolm McDowell as Prince Bolkonsky, The father
- Andrea Giordana as Count Rostov
- Brenda Blethyn as Márja Dmitriyevna Achrosímova
- Violante Placido as Helene Kuragina
- Toni Bertorelli as Vasily Kuragin
- Hannelore Elsner as Countess Rostova
- Benjamin Sadler as Dolokhov
- Pilar Abella as Mademoiselle Bourienne
- Ken Duken as Anatole Kuragin
- Hary Prinz as Denisov
- Vladimir Ilyin as Kutuzov
- Dimitri Isayev as Nikolai Rostov
- Valentina Cervi as Maria Bolkonskaya
- Elodie Frenck as Lise
- Scali Delpeyrat as Napoléon
- Frédéric Gorny as Ramballe
- Igor Kostolevsky as Tsar Alexander
- Ana Caterina Morariu as Sonja
- Romualdas Ramanauskas as General Mack
