= Scott Stangland =

American actor and singer

- Occupation(s): Actor, singer
- Years active: 2005–present
- Known for: Natasha, Pierre & The Great Comet of 1812

Scott Stangland is an American actor and singer. He's most well known for his performances as Eamon in Once and Pierre Bezukhov in Natasha, Pierre & The Great Comet of 1812, both on Broadway. For the latter performance, he won an Elliot Norton Award and IRNE Award in the pre-Broadway run at the A.R.T. When Great Comet transferred to the Imperial Theatre, singer-songwriter Josh Groban took over the role of Pierre and Stangland became the standby. However, later in the run, he took over the role for a temporary stint in between the runs of Okieriete Onaodowan and the show's creator, Dave Malloy.

== Acting credits ==
=== Theatre ===
Year(s)	Production	Role	Location	Notes
2011	The Merry Wives of Windsor	Pistol / Fenton / John	Various	Tour of Reading
2012	Troilus and Cressida	Diomedes	Various	Tour of Reading
2012	A Christmas Carol	Ensemble	Goodman Theatre	Regional
2013	The Reign of King Edward the Third	Duke of Lorraine / Villers	Various	Tour of Reading
2014-2015	Once	Eamon	Bernard B. Jacobs Theatre	Broadway
2015-2016	Natasha, Pierre & The Great Comet of 1812	Pierre Bezukhov	American Repertory Theater	Pre-Broadway Tryout
2016-2017	Natasha, Pierre & The Great Comet of 1812	Standby Pierre Bezukhov	Imperial Theatre	Broadway
2017	Natasha, Pierre & The Great Comet of 1812	Pierre Bezukhov	Imperial Theatre	Broadway
2017	Natasha, Pierre & The Great Comet of 1812	Standby Pierre Bezukhov	Imperial Theatre	Broadway
2019	Once	Eamon	Benedum Center	Regional
2019	Cyrano	Montgomery	Daryl Roth Theatre	Off-Broadway
2022	Shucked	Tank / Ensemble; Understudy Gordy; Understudy Storyteller 2	Pioneer Theatre Company	Regional
2023-2024	Shucked	Tank / Ensemble; Understudy Peanut; Understudy Storyteller 2	Nederlander Theatre	Broadway
2024	Three Houses	Wolf	Signature Theatre Company	Off-Broadway
2024	Waitress	Cal	Wells Fargo Pavilion	Regional
2025	Dead Outlaw	u/s Band Leader u/s George / Louis Sonney u/s Charles Patterson / Louis	Longacre Theatre	Broadway

=== Filmography ===
Year(s)	Production	Role	Notes
2009	Gifted Hands: The Ben Carson Story	Peter Rausch	TV movie
2011	Contagion	Minnesota Health #1	Film
2012	Chicago Fire	Justin	1 episode
2014	Crisis	Aryan Brother	1 episode
2015	The End of the Tour	Party Friend 1	Film
2016	Miss Teri	Brodie	1 episode
2018	New Amsterdam	Matty Levy	1 episode
2019	Jessica Jones	Joby	1 episode
2019	The Deuce	JD Keller	1 episode
2019	Wu-Tang: An American Saga	Engineer	2 episodes
2019	The Marvelous Mrs. Maisel	Singing Beatnik	1 episode
2020	The Blacklist	Gerrit	1 episode
2021	FBI: Most Wanted	Evan	1 episode
2023	FBI	Gene Aldo	1 episode

== Awards and nominations ==
Year	Award	Category	Work	Result	Ref.
2016	Elliot Norton Award	Outstanding Performance by an Actor	Natasha, Pierre & The; Great Comet of 1812	Won	
2016	IRNE Awards	Best Actor in a Musical	Natasha, Pierre & The; Great Comet of 1812	Won	
