= Kuragin =

Kuragin (Russian: Курагин; feminine: Kuragina) is a Russian surname. Notable people with the surname include:

- Olga Kuragina (born 1959), Russian pentathlete

== Fictional characters ==
=== War and Peace ===
- Anatole Kuragin
- Hélène Kuragina
- Vasily Sergeyevich Kuragin

==== War & Peace (2016 TV series) ====
- Catiche Kuragina
- Julie Kuragina
