= Brittain Ashford =

American actress & musician

- Education: University of Washington
- Occupations: Actress; singer; songwriter
- Years active: 2008–present
- Known for: Natasha, Pierre & The Great Comet of 1812

Brittain Clare Ashford-Trotter is an American actress, singer and songwriter best known for portraying Sonya Rostova in the 2016 Broadway musical Natasha, Pierre & The Great Comet of 1812 and her performance in the original cast of Ghost Quartet. She also fronted the band Prairie Empire.

== Early life and education ==
Originally from Seattle, Washington, Ashford attended Roosevelt High School. She attended college at the University of Washington, Seattle.

== Career ==
=== Theatre ===
Ashford's first theatrical performance was as Sonya Rostova in the 2012 Ars Nova production of Dave Malloy's Natasha, Pierre & The Great Comet of 1812. Ashford continued to perform with the show in all future incarnations of it, including productions at Kazino, the American Repertory Theater, and at the Imperial Theatre, the latter of which marked her Broadway debut in 2016. Of her role, Ashford says, "I sympathize with Sonya, and I really love that she's there as this best friend presence that could be nothing, but she also gets this really tender, intimate, important moment in the show to talk about that friendship, which I think is just so nice and kind of refreshing." Ashford received praise for her performance as Sonya, and was nominated for multiple awards over the course of the shows multiple runs.

Ben Brantley of the New York Times stated in his article "The Tonys 2017: Who Will Win (and Who Should)" that Ashford "should have been nominated" for the Tony Award for Best Featured Actress in a Musical.

Ashford also performed in Dave Malloy's song-cycle Ghost Quartet. Ashford provided vocals for the show, as well as autoharp, keyboard, and percussion. She was praised for her performance as part of the quartet, with the Litro saying she "sounds like she's singing from the bottom of a sea of honey; her voice is at once lovely and perfectly eerie." Ashford stayed with the show while it performed at various venues across the US, including the American Repertory Theatre in Boston. The song-cycle re-opened at Next Door at NYTW, a black box theatre component of New York Theatre Workshop, in October 2017.

=== Music ===
In 2008, Ashford released her first solo album, There, But for You, Go I, via the Parisian label Waterhouse Records. In June 2012, she released her first record with her band Prairie Empire. Ashford recorded Prairie Empire (Trailer Fire Records) in Portland, Oregon, with support from members of the band Harlowe. Leslie Ventura of Las Vegas Weekly notes the "sheer emotive power of her voice", while Daytrotter praised the transportive capacity of the album's lyrics. Ashford has been praised for the unique and distinctive qualities of her voice, with one critic saying, "Her voice is tender, but also strong and determined…the threatened vulnerability was serenely vanquished."

In July 2016, Ashford released The Salt, her sophomore album with Prairie Empire. In a review for Veer Magazine, Shannon Jay said The Salt "embodies a delicate toughness", calling attention to Ashford's vocals, the "ambient complexity" of the arrangements and the album's powerful storytelling.

Ashford's third solo album, "Trotter", was released on May 19, 2023 via Pittsburgh based Misra Records. Ashford was awarded a grant through the NYC Women’s Fund for Media, Music and Theatre Fund for work associated with the album.

== Theater credits ==
Year	Production	Character	Category	Theatre
2012	Natasha, Pierre & The Great Comet of 1812	Sonya Rostova	Off-off-Broadway	Ars Nova
2013-2014	Natasha, Pierre & The Great Comet of 1812	Sonya Rostova	Off-Broadway	Kazino
2014–2015	Ghost Quartet	Rose Red / Roxie / Starchild / Dunyazad / Photographer	Off-Broadway	Bushwick Starr
2014–2015	Ghost Quartet	Rose Red / Roxie / Starchild / Dunyazad / Photographer	Off-Broadway	McKittrick Hotel
2015	Ghost Quartet	Rose Red / Roxie / Starchild / Dunyazad / Photographer	Regional	American Repertory Theater
2015	Ghost Quartet	Rose Red / Roxie / Starchild / Dunyazad / Photographer	Regional	Curran Theatre
2015-2016	Natasha, Pierre & The Great Comet of 1812	Sonya Rostova	Regional	American Repertory Theater
2016	Ghost Quartet	Rose Red / Roxie / Starchild / Dunyazad / Photographer	Regional	Edinburgh Festival Fringe
2016–2017	Natasha, Pierre & The Great Comet of 1812	Sonya Rostova	Broadway	Imperial Theatre
2017	Ghost Quartet	Rose Red / Roxie / Starchild / Dunyazad / Photographer	Off-Broadway	New York Theatre Workshop
2018	Ghost Quartet	Rose Red / Roxie / Starchild / Dunyazad / Photographer	Regional	Seattle Theatre Group
2018	Blood Wedding	Wife	Regional	The Williams Project
2019	Cowboy	Cowboy	Off-off-Broadway	The Doxsee
2025	Ghost Quartet	Rose Red / Roxie / Starchild / Dunyazad / Photographer	Ten Year Anniversary Concert	Green-Wood Cemetery

== Discography ==
=== Albums ===
- There, But For You, Go I (2008)
- Drama Club (2019)
- Trotter (2023)

=== with Prairie Empire ===
- Prairie Empire (2012)
- The Salt (2016)

=== Extended plays ===
- Auld Lang Syne (2012)
- Tinsel and Snow & Other Mid-Winter Missives with Matt Bauer (2018)
- Day Inside a Night with Matt Bauer (2020)

=== Singles ===
- "Please Leave a Light on When You Go" (feat. Dave Malloy) (2012)
- "Good for Goodness" (2017)
- "Time Takes Time" (2017)
- "Bells, Boxes" (2017)
- "For the First Time" (2019)
- "You're the One That I Want" (2019)
- "Sonya Alone" (2019)
- "Bitter and the Herb" (2020)
- "Ugly" with Matt Bauer (2020)
- "Night in Saguaro" with Matt Bauer (2020)
- "Fade into You" with the Memory Spells (2021)
- "Could've Done You Better" (2023)
- "Hold on Tight" (2023)

=== Cast recordings ===
- Natasha, Pierre and the Great Comet of 1812 (Highlights From the Original Cast Recording) (2013)
- Natasha, Pierre and the Great Comet of 1812 (Original Cast Recording) (2013)
- Ghost Quartet (2015)
- Ghost Quartet: Live at the McKittrick (2016)
- Natasha, Pierre and the Great Comet of 1812 (Original Broadway Cast Recording) (2017)

== Awards and nominations ==
Sources: TheaterMania, Lortel Archives

Year	Award	Category	Play	Results
2014	Lucille Lortel Award	Outstanding Featured Actress in a Musical	Natasha, Pierre, & The Great Comet of 1812	Nominated
2016	IRNE Award	Supporting Actress, Musical	Natasha, Pierre, & The Great Comet of 1812	Nominated
