= Bezukhov =

Bezukhov (Russian: Безухов, meaning lacking ears) is a Russian masculine surname, its feminine counterpart is Bezukhova. Notable people with the surname include:

- Pierre Bezukhov, central character in Tolstoy's novel War and Peace
