= War and Peace (1956 film) =

1956 film by King Vidor

- Theatrical release poster
- Directed by: King Vidor
- Screenplay by: Bridget Boland; King Vidor; Robert Westerby; Mario Camerini; Ennio De Concini; Ivo Perilli
- Based on: War and Peace (1869 novel) by Leo Tolstoy
- Produced by: Dino De Laurentiis
- Starring: Audrey Hepburn; Henry Fonda; Mel Ferrer; Vittorio Gassman; Herbert Lom; Oskar Homolka; Anita Ekberg; Helmut Dantine; Barry Jones; Anna Maria Ferrero; Milly Vitale; Jeremy Brett; John Mills
- Cinematography: Jack Cardiff
- Edited by: Leo Cattozzo; Stuart Gilmore (sup.)
- Music by: Nino Rota
- Production company: Ponti-De Laurentiis Cinematografica
- Distributed by: Paramount Pictures (U.S.); Dino de Laurentiis Cinematografica (Italy)
- Release dates: August 21, 1956 (U.S.); December 29, 1956 (Italy)
- Running time: 208 minutes
- Countries: United States; Italy
- Language: English
- Budget: $5 million
- Box office: $12.25 million (US/Italy/France/Germany rentals)

War and Peace (Italian: Guerra e pace) is a 1956 epic historical drama film based on the 1869 novel by Leo Tolstoy. It was directed and co-written by King Vidor, produced by Dino De Laurentiis and Carlo Ponti, and distributed by Paramount Pictures. The film stars Audrey Hepburn as Natasha, Henry Fonda as Pierre, and Mel Ferrer as Andrei, along with Vittorio Gassman, Herbert Lom, Oskar Homolka, Anita Ekberg (in one of her first breakthrough roles), Helmut Dantine, Barry Jones, Anna Maria Ferrero, Milly Vitale, Jeremy Brett and John Mills. The musical score was composed by Nino Rota and conducted by Franco Ferrara.

War and Peace opened on August 21, 1956, to a mixed reception, with some reviewers critical with the film truncating much of Tolstoy's novel, and the casting of 50-year-old Henry Fonda as the 20-year-old Pierre Bezukhov. It received Academy Awards nominations for Best Director, Best Cinematography (Color), and Best Costume Design (Color). It was also nominated for four Golden Globes, including Best Motion Picture – Drama and Best Actress in a Motion Picture – Drama (Audrey Hepburn), and shared the award for Best Foreign Film.

== Plot ==
In 1805, most of Europe is torn apart by Napoleon Bonaparte's drive to conquer more and more territory. In Moscow, many young men have joined the army, including Nicholas Rostov, the son of Count Ilya Rostov and his wife Nataly, and the brother of young Petya and the flighty but devoted Natasha. The Rostovs' friend Pierre, the illegitimate son of the ailing, wealthy Count Bezukhov, has recently returned from Paris and believes that Napoleon is a "cleansing force" who can establish equality and liberty.

Despite his pacifism, Pierre wishes Nicholas well and then visits his friend, army officer Dolokhov, a notorious rake. There, the comrades indulge in drinking games but are interrupted by Prince Andrei Bolkonsky, an officer of much finer character than Dolokhov. Andrei informs Pierre that his estranged father, who is near death, is calling for him, and Pierre goes to his father's mansion, where various relatives snub him. Their derision changes to hypocritical concern, however, after the old count dies and it is discovered that he has accepted Pierre as legitimate and named him his sole heir.

The scheming Hélène Kuragina immediately sets her sights on Pierre and soon he falls in love with her, while her father, Prince Vasily Kuragin, insinuates himself as the administrator of Pierre's vast estates. One day, Pierre runs into Andrei in the country as Andrei is escorting his pregnant wife Lise to his father's house. Andrei, who feels trapped by the clinging Lise, had earlier advised Pierre never to marry, and now Pierre refuses to accept his warnings. After Andrei takes Lise to live with his sister Mary and gruff father, Prince Nicholas Bolkonsky, he leaves for the front and is made an adjutant to the commander of the army, Field Marshal Mikhail Kutuzov. At the Battle of Austerlitz, Andrei attempts to rally the retreating men by grabbing their banner and rushing the enemy, but he is wounded and left for dead. While surveying the battlefield, Napoleon comes across Andrei and, admiring his courage, orders that he be tended to by his personal physician.

In Moscow, when Pierre learns that the Russians are suing for peace, Hélène persuades him to return to the country alone so that she can spend the season in the city, welcoming the soldiers. Nicholas comes home safely, much to the delight of Natasha. Meanwhile, Andrei returns to his family, just as Lise goes into labor. Although their son Kolya survives, Lise dies after giving birth, and the grieving Andrei blames himself for not offering her enough comfort and love. As time passes, Hélène begins a flirtation with Dolokhov, and when Pierre learns of the rumors about them, he insults Dolokhov and accepts his challenge of a duel. Although Pierre is woefully unskilled with firearms, he manages to shoot and wound Dolokhov, while the soldier's shot goes wide and Pierre is unharmed. Infuriated that he was provoked into acting in such an uncivilized manner, Pierre separates from Hélène and agrees to accompany the Rostovs to their country estate.

One day, while they are hunting, they meet Andrei, who is enchanted by Natasha. Later, Andrei dances with Natasha when she attends her first ball and realizes that he wants to marry her. Prince Bolkonsky urges Andrei to wait a year, as Natasha is so young and the Rostovs are not their social equals, but promises to consent if Andrei still wishes to marry her then. With Natasha's promise to wait for him, Andrei then joins the mission to Prussia, where Czar Alexander and Napoleon sign a peace treaty in June 1807. While Andrei is gone, however, Natasha is seduced by Anatole Kuragin, Hélène's brother, who is as cold-hearted and debauched as his sister. Even though he is secretly married, Anatole persuades Natasha to elope with him, but their plans are foiled by Natasha's cousin Sonya and Pierre, who threatens Anatole with exposure of his marriage if he ruins Natasha's reputation. Pierre's threats come too late, however, and soon all of Moscow is gossiping about Natasha, who falls ill after Andrei ends their relationship. After several months, she begs Pierre to convey her regret to Andrei, and Pierre, who is in love with her, assures her that she is blameless, and that if he were free, he would ask for her hand.

In 1812, Napoleon crosses the River Neman into Russia, despite the peace treaty. Faced with the superiority of the French Army, Kutuzov orders his men to retreat, and as they fall back, the soldiers and peasants set fire to the countryside so that the French will be without provisions. Although his officers protest his strategy, Kutuzov insists that the only way to save Russia is by letting the French wear themselves out. Soon the city of Smolensk is abandoned and Kutuzov decides to make a stand at Borodino. Determined to see war firsthand, to decide if his hatred of it is valid, Pierre travels to Borodino, where he finds Andrei's camp on the eve of the battle. Although Pierre urges Andrei to forgive Natasha, Andrei states that he cannot. The next morning, Pierre watches with mounting horror as the fighting rages around him and the French slaughter the Russians. Finally realizing that his hero is just a tyrant, Pierre damns Napoleon. Kutuzov then decides to fall back beyond Moscow, leaving the ancient capital city to the French.

In Moscow, the Rostovs are among the many families preparing to flee when some wounded Russian soldiers arrive, hoping to be billeted at their home after their departure. Natasha insists that the men cannot be left behind to be captured, however, and they are loaded into the Rostov wagons and taken to a distant village. Napoleon is infuriated to learn that the government has fled, leaving no one behind to surrender to him. Although Pierre lies in wait one day, hoping to assassinate the French emperor, he cannot do it and is taken prisoner. Meanwhile, Natasha has learned that Andrei is among the wounded in their care and reunites with him. While Pierre is befriended by a fellow prisoner, the peasant Platon, the Rostovs take Andrei to a monastery to convalesce. Andrei's wounds prove fatal, however, and he dies just after Mary and Kolya arrive to bid him farewell.

Napoleon realizes that he has been outmaneuvered by Kutuzov, and, fearing being trapped in Russia during the winter, orders his men to retreat. The prisoners, including Pierre and Platon, are forced to accompany the soldiers during their 2,000-mile (3,200 km) march, and many of them die. The Russian soldiers follow behind the French, allowing them little rest and picking off stragglers. Petya, who has joined the army against his parents' wishes, is sent with a dispatch to Dolokhov, ordering his platoon to join the main regiment. Eager for one last fight, Dolokhov insists on attacking the French the next morning and allows Petya to accompany him. Petya is killed during the engagement, and although Pierre is freed, he is too overcome by the boy's death to rejoice. Dolokhov informs Pierre that Hélène has died, and later, joins the other Russian soldiers as they attack the French, who are fleeing back across the Neman.

The Rostovs return to Moscow and find their mansion a burned-out shell, with only one wing remaining intact. Natasha rallies her family to make the best of what they have, however, and as the others settle in, Natasha sadly remembers happier times. She then sees Pierre in the doorway and rushes to embrace him. Telling him that he is like their house, which suffers and shows its wounds but still stands, Natasha kisses Pierre, and they walk together in the garden.

== Cast ==
- Audrey Hepburn as Natasha Rostova
- Henry Fonda as Count Pierre Bezukhov
- Mel Ferrer as Prince Andrei Bolkonsky
- Vittorio Gassman as Prince Anatole Kuragin
- Herbert Lom as Napoleon Bonaparte
- Oskar Homolka as Field Marshal Mikhail Kutuzov
- Anita Ekberg as Hélène Kuragina
- Helmut Dantine as Fedor Dolokhov
- Tullio Carminati as Prince Vasily Kuragin
- Barry Jones as Count Mikhail Rostov
- Milly Vitale as Lise Bolkonskaya
- Lea Seidl as Countess Natalya Rostova
- Anna Maria Ferrero as Mary Bolkonskaya
- Wilfrid Lawson as Prince Nikolai Bolkonsky
- May Britt as Sonya Rostova
- Jeremy Brett as Nicholas Rostov
- Patrick Crean as Vas'ka Denisov
- Seán Barrett as Petya Rostov
- Gertrude Flynn as Mariya Peronskaya
- John Mills as Platon Karatayev

=== Uncredited ===
- Clelia Matania as Mademoiselle Georges
- Gualtiero Tumiati as Count Kirill Bezukhov
- Guido Celano as Victor
- Marisa Allasio as Matrosha
- Maria Zanoli as Mavra
- Robert Stephens as a Russian officer
- Charles Fernley Fawcett as an artillery officer

== Differences from the novel ==
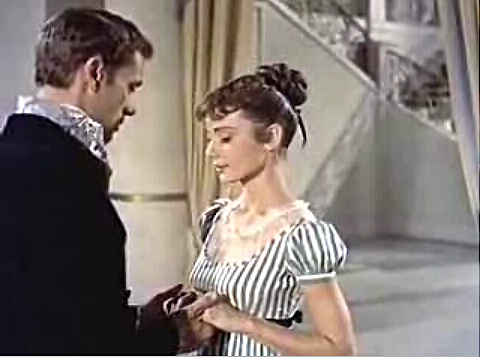
Andrei Bolkonsky (Mel Ferrer, left) and Natasha Rostova (Audrey Hepburn, right)

The film script had to be greatly condensed from the extensive original novel. It is primarily focused on Natasha, Pierre, and Andrei, their complex relationship and personal maturation on the backdrop of the historical events of the Napoleonic invasion.

- In Moscow, most of the scenes take place at the Rostov residence, and episodes at the country estates are curtailed, with some exceptions such as the hunt where Natasha first meets Andrei. This is a condensation of two scenes at the Rostov country estate, since in the novel Andrei, who by then is already Natasha's fiancé, is not present at the hunt.
- There are no scenes in St. Petersburg.
- The relationship between Nicholas, Sonya and Maria is toned down.
- Historical figures retained are General Kutuzov and Napoleon.
- Minor battles are omitted, while Napoleon's crossing of the Berezina, not depicted in the novel, is added.
- The concept of the inner dialogue is retained, notably in regard to Natasha, but the extensive use of French is not retained in the film.
- Events of the epilogue are not included, nor are Tolstoy's discourses about history.

== Production ==
=== Development ===
British producer Alexander Korda announced interest in adapting Tolstoy's novel for the screen as early as 1941, with Orson Welles directing, Merle Oberon and Agnes Moorehead, with a screenplay by Lillian Hellman. Korda's production was never realized, due to an inability to strike a deal with the Soviet government. In the 1950s, Mike Todd began actively pursuing a film adaptation, even arranging with Soviet and Yugoslavian officials for filming locations and the massive number of required extras, and hiring Fred Zinnemann to direct. The production was abandoned by Todd in order to focus on Around the World in Eighty Days.

Italian producers Dino De Laurentiis and Carlo Ponti announced their film in October 1954. Initially, they approached Elia Kazan to direct and Gérard Philipe and Marlon Brando to star. When a deal with Kazan couldn't be reached, De Laurentiis tentatively announced Mario Camerini as his replacement, before King Vidor was eventually hired.

=== Casting ===
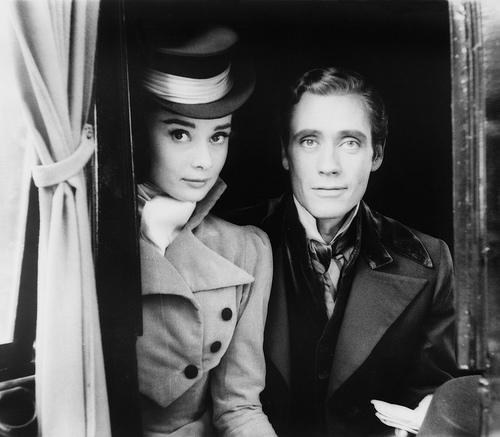
Audrey Hepburn and Mel Ferrer on the set of War and Peace in 1955

Audrey Hepburn, who was one of the biggest female film stars in the world at the time, was cast as Natasha after previous favorite Jean Simmons turned it down. Todd had previously attempted to hire her for his failed adaptation, but she signed with De Laurentiis and Ponti after they offered a record salary of $350,000. The contract gave Hepburn a fair amount of creative control, including the hiring of costume fitter Hubert de Givenchy and makeup artist Grazia De Rossi. She also facilitated the hiring of her husband Mel Ferrer as Andrei, the only time the couple would co-star on-screen together. Because Hepburn was under contract to Paramount Pictures and Associated British Picture Corporation at the time, the two companies were given the respective US and UK distribution rights in exchange for Hepburn's services.

Vidor wanted either Paul Scofield or Peter Ustinov as Pierre, but both suggestions were rejected by De Laurentiis, who thought neither actor was "marketable". Gregory Peck, Montgomery Clift, Stewart Granger, Richard Burton, and Marlon Brando were all considered. Henry Fonda, who was eventually cast in the part, was widely thought to be too old to play the role (he was 50 at the time, playing a character 30 years his junior). He later stated he regretted taking the part, only doing so because of the money and because he was a fan of the novel. He claimed that the script he was given was very different from the one used during filming, which was heavily revised by Vidor.

Arlene Dahl was originally cast as Helene, but she fell ill shortly before filming and was replaced by Anita Ekberg, who was borrowed from Batjac Productions. The film proved to be Ekberg's breakthrough and helped lead to her international stardom.

Fredric March was originally cast as Field Marshal Kutuzov, but was replaced before filming by Oskar Homolka, who would be nominated for a BAFTA for his performance. Valentina Cortese, Gino Cervi, and Massimo Serato were all attached in 1955 but were dropped at some point before filming started.

=== Writing ===
War and Peace has six credited screenwriters, an unusually high number for a mainstream film, even in 1956. The first draft of the screenplay was five hundred six pages, roughly five times the size of an average screenplay.

Contemporaneous sources claim that Irwin Shaw was one of the writers, but insisted his name be stricken from the credits after he learned that Vidor's wife, Elizabeth Hill, rewrote much of the dialogue. Vidor also made extensive rewrites during filming. Uncredited contributors to the final script included Jean Aurenche, Pierre Bost, Sergio Amidei, Gian Gaspare Napolitano, and second-unit director Mario Soldati.

=== Filming ===
The film was shot primarily at Ponti-De Laurentiis and Cinecittà Studios in Rome, as well as at locations in Rome, Turin, and Sardinia. More than 100,000 uniforms, costumes and hairpieces required for the film were reproduced from original, contemporary drawings. About 18,000 Italian military personnel were used as extras in the film's large-scale battle scenes, which caused some controversy in parliamentary circles. The battle scenes, which were primarily directed by Mario Soldati, employed 65 physicians, dressed as soldiers and scattered throughout the location, to take care of any extras or stuntmen who might get injured during filming of the scenes.

Fonda repeatedly clashed with De Laurentiis during filming over the characterization of Pierre. De Laurentiis, who had apparently never read the novel, insisted Pierre be played as a more conventional romantic, heroic lead and insisted he not wear eyeglasses. Fonda claimed that De Laurentiis would go into fits of screaming rage whenever he saw him wearing glasses, which led to him wearing them only whenever De Laurentiis wasn't present on set.

=== Post-production ===
Swedish actresses Anita Ekberg and May Britt had all their dialogue re-dubbed during editing due to their accents being considered too strong. Several of the supporting Italian actors were likewise dubbed.

The Italian version was dubbed completely, supervised by Enrico Maria Salerno and Vittorio Gassmann.

== Reception ==
=== Box office ===
By January 1957, War and Peace had earned $6.25 million in box office rentals from the United States and Canada. De Laurentiis felt that Paramount improperly handled distribution and that it should have made two or three times as much. By April 1958, it had earned over $6 million in France, Italy and Germany. It was one of the most popular films of all time in Italy with admissions of 15.7 million. Re-releases in North America and Australia between 2019 and 2021 grossed $149,485.

In the United States, the film sold an estimated 24,038,000 tickets. In Europe, the film sold 26,756,521 tickets across Italy, France and Germany. After distribution rights were sold for $120,000 to the Soviet Union in 1958, the film released there in 1959 and sold 31.4 million tickets. Between 1999 and 2024, the film sold 680 tickets in other European countries.

=== Critical reaction ===
Abel Green of Variety praised the film as a "rich contribution to the art form of the picture business in the best tradition. It is an entertainment and educational force and a production powerhouse on size and stature values alone. It is big in the biggest sense of the cinematurgical art and, in this alone, there is a payoff." Harrison's Reports wrote the "picture, technically, is a masterpiece. The massiveness of the sets, the gigantic cast of thousands, the costuming, the surge of vast military forces in conflict, the burning of Moscow, the disastrous retreat of Napoleon's conquering hordes in the midst of a brutal and paralyzing Russian winter --- all this and more is depicted in a way that impresses one with the fact that millions of dollars had gone into the making." Bosley Crowther of The New York Times praised the film as "massive, colorful and exciting as anything of this sort we've ever seen". However, he felt the characters were "second-rate people, hackneyed and without much depth. You view them with an objective interest as they do their parade across the screen, giving off little more personal vibrance than the nameless soldiers in the massive scenes of war."

Time magazine wrote that the film adaptation was not faithful enough of Tolstoy's novel, and the "inevitable result is a telescoping of scenes and a hopscotching through the plot that scatters attention from one leading character to another." Of the actors, the magazine praised Audrey Hepburn, and remarked "Henry Fonda's leanness at first seems all wrong for the massive, moonfaced, soul-tortured Pierre. But Fonda builds beautifully into his part, using a physical clumsiness as a counterpoise to his soaring spirit, making his rages seem the more terrible since they flash out from passivity." Alternately, Edwin Schallert of the Los Angeles Times felt Fonda was miscast because "he seems like an anti character in his behavior on the battlefields. He is actually the symbolic figure of peaceful thinking in the story, and represents the heroine's lasting romance." Hollis Alpert, reviewing for Saturday Review, stated the adaptation "is only intermittently interesting and that aside from making a sort of pictorial sour-mash of the original work it is not particularly good movie-making."

Rotten Tomatoes reports that 50% of 10 reviews were positive, with an average rating of 5.9/10.

The film is recognized by American Film Institute in these lists:

- 2005: AFI's 100 Years of Film Scores – Nominated
- 2008: AFI's 10 Top 10:
  - Nominated Epic Film

In February 2020, the film was shown at the 70th Berlin International Film Festival as part of a retrospective dedicated to King Vidor's career.

In 2025, The Hollywood Reporter listed War and Peace as having the best stunts of 1956.

=== Accolades ===
| Award | Year | Category | Nominee | Result |
|---|---|---|---|---|
| Academy Awards | 1957 | Best Director | King Vidor | Nominated |
| Academy Awards | 1957 | Best Cinematography, Color | Jack Cardiff | Nominated |
| Academy Awards | 1957 | Best Costume Design, Color | Maria De Matteis | Nominated |
| British Academy Film Awards | 1957 | Best Film | | Nominated |
| British Academy Film Awards | 1957 | Best British Actress | Audrey Hepburn | Nominated |
| British Society of Cinematographers | 1956 | Best Cinematography in a Theatrical Feature Film | Jack Cardiff | Nominated |
| Directors Guild of America | 1957 | Outstanding Directing - Feature Film | King Vidor | Nominated |
| Golden Globe Awards | 1957 | Best Motion Picture – Drama | | Nominated |
| Golden Globe Awards | 1957 | Best Director | King Vidor | Nominated |
| Golden Globe Awards | 1957 | Best Actress in a Motion Picture – Drama | Audrey Hepburn | Nominated |
| Golden Globe Awards | 1957 | Best Supporting Actor – Motion Picture | Oscar Homolka | Nominated |
| Golden Globe Awards | 1957 | Best Foreign Film | | Won |
| Nastro d'Argento | 1957 | Best Producer | Dino De Laurentiis | Nominated |
| Nastro d'Argento | 1957 | Best Score | Nino Rota | Won |
| Nastro d'Argento | 1957 | Best Production Design | Mario Chiari | Won |
| National Board of Review | 1956 | Top Foreign Films | | Won |
| New York Film Critics Circle | 1956 | Best Actress | Audrey Hepburn | Nominated |

== Legacy ==
Following its release in the Soviet Union in July 1959, the film inspired Soviet cinema to produce a film adaptation of Tolstoy's novel in the 1960s, directed by Sergei Bondarchuk (who played Pierre Bezukhov) and co-starring Vyacheslav Tikhonov and Ludmila Savelyeva as Prince Andrei Bolkonsky and Natasha Rostova. This four-part adaptation is critically acclaimed for its realistic battle scenes, for which it won an Academy Award for Best Foreign Language Film.

== See also ==
- List of American films of 1956
- List of Italian films of 1956
- War and Peace - 1941 opera composed by Sergei Prokofiev
- War and Peace - 1966-67-film series directed by Sergei Bondarchuk
- War and Peace - 1972 TV 20-part BBC Production
- War and Peace - 2007 TV 4-Part French-Italian mini series
- War & Peace - 2016 British-American TV mini series, BBC and A&E Production
