= The Kid (musical) =

- Characters Dan and Terry, in scene from The Kid (2010)
- Music: Andy Monroe
- Lyrics: Jack Lechner
- Book: Michael Zam
- Basis: The Kid: What Happened After My Boyfriend and I Decided to Go Get Pregnant by Dan Savage
- Productions: 2010 Off-Broadway, Theatre Row, New York City, The New Group
- Awards: 2009 BMI Foundation Jerry Bock Award for Excellence in Musical Theatre; 2011 Outer Critics Circle Award for Outstanding New Off-Broadway Musical

The Kid is a musical with a book by Michael Zam, music composed by Andy Monroe and lyrics by Jack Lechner. The comic story concerns an open adoption process by a same-sex couple. It is based on the 1999 non-fiction book by Dan Savage, The Kid: What Happened After My Boyfriend and I Decided to Go Get Pregnant. The protagonist, Dan, is a sex advice columnist who decides to adopt a child with his partner Terry. Throughout the musical the couple encounter difficulties including making the decision to adopt, finding a birth mother, and overcoming apprehension about the adoption process.

The musical premiered on May 10, 2010 Off-Broadway, starring Christopher Sieber as Dan. It received a generally favorable reception and received five Drama Desk Award nominations in 2011, including Outstanding Musical, Outstanding Lyrics and Outstanding Book of a Musical.

== Plot ==
Act I

Dan is a gay sex advice columnist ("I'm Asking You"), and his partner is Terry. The two initially become involved in a relationship with each other after bonding over a discussion of Gore Vidal ("Gore Vidal"). In a later scene, Dan attempts to convince Terry to leave a bathroom in a hotel where he locked himself inside after the two have an argument ("Terry..."). The couple meet with other individuals who are looking to become parents and adopt children ("They Hate Us"). Dan composes a satirical letter to potential birth mothers listing entries which should obviously not be included ("If You Give Us Your Baby"). Dan and Terry meet with an adoption counselor named Anne to go over their worries about becoming parents. The adoption counselor tells them, "Man or woman, gay or straight, what you're facing is a long, long wait." The couple decide upon an open adoption process, where they will be able to meet the baby's birth mother. Melissa, a teenager who is pregnant and homeless, selects them as the couple to care for her child ("Her Name Is Melissa"). She describes her life to Dan and Terry ("Spare Changin'").

Act II

Dan's mother informs him she knew he was gay as a child but did not meddle in his process of becoming a gay adult ("I Knew"). She reassures him during a period of nervousness, telling Dan, "If you think this is scary, wait. Do you know how terrified I was when you first had measles?" Bacchus, the biological father of Melissa's child, appears and becomes involved in the decision regarding the outcome for the baby ("Behind the Wheel"). Dan and Terry worry over whether Melissa will change her mind during the adoption process ("42 Hours"). After the child is born, the couple share the experience of holding their new baby together ("Beautiful"), and all ends happily ("My Kid").

== Musical numbers ==
Act I

- I'm Asking You – Company
- The Kid – Dan, Dan's Mother
- Terry... – Dan, Terry
- They Hate Us – Company
- The Kid (Reprise) – Ruth, Dan, Terry
- Nice – Anne, Dan, Terry
- Gore Vidal – Terry, Dan
- If You Give Us Your Baby – Dan, Terry, Susan
- Seize the Day – Company
- Her Name is Melissa – Dan, Terry, Anne
- Spare Changin' – Melissa
- What Do You Say? – Company

Act II

- We're Asking You – Ensemble
- It's Not Your Baby – Anne, Dan, Terry
- When They Put Him In Your Arms – Dan, Terry
- It Gets Better – Company
- Behind the Wheel – Bacchus
- I Knew – Dan's Mother
- Beautiful – Terry, Dan
- 42 Hours – Dan, Terry, Melissa
- My Kid – Dan

== Background ==
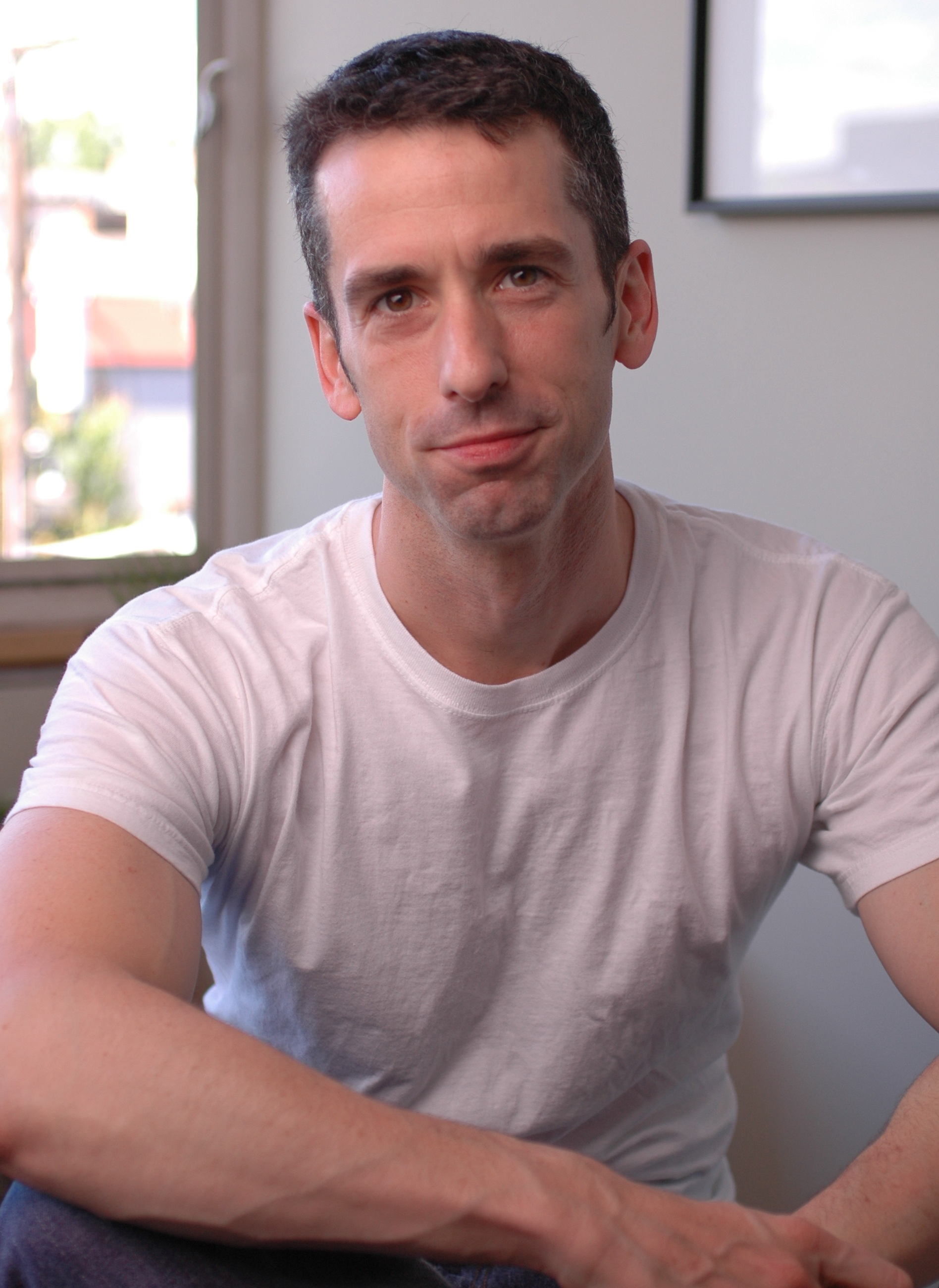
Dan Savage (2005)

Production on the musical began in 2005. Zam and Monroe had both previously read Savage's book. Monroe approached Zam and told him he thought the material would make a good musical. Zam and Monroe contacted Lechner, as they wished to have him involved in the musical's production process. In an interview with The New York Times, Zam later commented, "We also wanted to create a musical that was true to the experiences of Dan Savage and his partner, Terry, capture the essence of who they were, without just imposing our own plot and music on their lives. But it was also thrilling to create a show around a person who is not your standard role-model character, who is insightful about his foibles and admits to them and who has all these powerful emotions that we knew – somehow – could be turned into powerful songs."

After Zam, Monroe and Lechner determined an initial plan for developing the musical, Lechner contacted his friend Kate Clinton, who was also a friend of Savage and could make an introduction. The three-member production team met with Savage and convinced him of the merits of developing his book into a musical. Monroe told The Advocate, "Dan has a really good way of framing [adoption by gays] with his own brand of humor. It becomes less of a political piece and more of a human story." Savage gave feedback to the production team, during the adaptation process, providing them with "thousands of words of notes". The work takes the form of a "presentational musical", wherein the character of Dan speaks directly to the audience about his experiences.

== Production ==
The original production was organized by The New Group and directed by Scott Elliott. Dan was portrayed by Christopher Sieber. Elliott served as the artistic director for The New Group. Elliott observed to The New York Times, "One of the great parts of the book was that it was political without being political, that it tells a story of two guys creating a family without having to shove the politics of that experience in America down audience members' throats. But we were also conscious of the delicacy of turning a popular book, particularly one man's deeply felt memoir, into a piece of theater." Rosie O'Donnell promoted the musical through a discussion titled "The Modern Family: A Discussion of Gay Adoption" that was held by The New Group on April 18, 2010. O'Donnell commented, "I was blown away: here was the first show that really showed what it's like for a gay person who wants to be a parent – but also what it's like for anyone going through this crazy but thrilling process."

The musical premiered on May 10, 2010, Off-Broadway in Theatre Row, New York City at the Acorn Theatre. The production ran through May 29, 2010. Dan, Terry and their 12-year-old son DJ attended the premiere. Terry described the experience of watching himself portrayed onstage as "surreal".

== Principal roles and notable performers ==
Character	Description	Notable stage performers
Dan	A journalist and author, who maintains a sex advice column	Christopher Sieber°
Terry	Dan's partner and husband	Lucas Steele°
Judy	Dan's mother	Jill Eikenberry°
Ruth		Ann Harada°
Anne	An adoption counselor who advises Dan and Terry	Susan Blackwell°
Susan		Brooke Sunny Moriber°
Melissa	Biological mother of adopted child	Jeannine Frumess°
Bacchus	Biological father of adopted child	Michael Wartella°
Chad		Tyler Maynard°
Reg		Kevin Anthony°
Josh		Justin Patterson°

° denotes original Off-Broadway cast

== Reception ==
The Kid received a generally favorable reception and was recognized with the 2009 BMI Foundation Jerry Bock Award for Excellence in Musical Theatre, in the category of Best New Musical. Composer Jerry Bock, a Pulitzer Prize and Tony Award recipient, chose the BMI Lehman Engel Musical Theater Workshop-developed musical to receive the award.

The Kid received nominations in 2011 for five Drama Desk Awards including Outstanding Musical, Outstanding Lyrics, and Outstanding Book of a Musical; in addition to nominations for a Lucille Lortel Award and a GLAAD Media Award. It won the 2011 Outer Critics Circle Award in the category of Outstanding New Off-Broadway Musical.

Ben Brantley reviewed the musical for The New York Times, writing that it informs viewers that same-sex couples are similar to everyone else: "This message is transmitted with a consistency and a thoroughness that are rare in contemporary musicals." A review in TheaterMania praised the musical composition, stating that the musical "does a good job capturing the tone of Savage's book, which is filled with irreverent humor, frank talk about sex, and the understandable fears and anxieties that go hand in hand with the anticipation of becoming a parent." Roma Torre reviewed the musical for NY1, observing, "The Kid is aimed at anyone who's ever had a family, lost a family or craved one — which actually means just about all of us. The fact that it's about two gay men attempting to adopt a baby from a homeless teenager doesn't make it any less universal. In fact, it's the details based on true events that give this sweetly clever, somewhat sentimental love story its disarming appeal."

The Star-Ledger noted, "A lot of the jokes are based on the would-be adoptive couple being two men. But the sharp humor is balanced with a sweetness and humanity that makes their emotional experience relatable for everyone." Writing for New York Press, reviewer Mark Peikert was less enthusiastic: "Buttery, salty and ultimately unmemorable, the song-strewn adaptation of sex columnist Dan Savage's book about adopting a child with his boyfriend is a funny, smart and enjoyable musical – as long as it's being performed right in front of you. But once you leave the theater, you'll be hard pressed to remember just what about it you enjoyed."

== Awards ==
Year	Award	Organization	Category	Result
2009	Jerry Bock Award for Excellence in Musical Theatre	BMI Foundation	Best New Musical	Won
2011	Drama Desk Award	Drama Desk	Outstanding Musical	Nominated
2011	Drama Desk Award	Drama Desk	Outstanding Actor in a Musical (Christopher Sieber)	Nominated
2011	Drama Desk Award	Drama Desk	Outstanding Featured Actress in a Musical (Jill Eikenberry)	Nominated
2011	Drama Desk Award	Drama Desk	Outstanding Lyrics (Jack Lechner)	Nominated
2011	Drama Desk Award	Drama Desk	Outstanding Book of a Musical (Michael Zam)	Nominated
2011	Lucille Lortel Awards	The League of Off-Broadway Theatres and Producers	Outstanding Musical	Nominated
2011	GLAAD Media Awards	Gay & Lesbian Alliance Against Defamation	Outstanding New York Theater: Broadway and Off-Broadway	Nominated
2011	Outer Critics Circle Award	Outer Critics Circle	Outstanding New Off-Broadway Musical	Won

== See also ==
- Heterosexism
- LGBT adoption
- LGBT parenting
- LGBT rights
- Same-sex marriages and civil unions
- Preacher's Sons, documentary about a gay adoptive couple
- Mommy Mommy, documentary about a lesbian adoptive couple
