= Christopher Sieber =

American actor (born 1969)

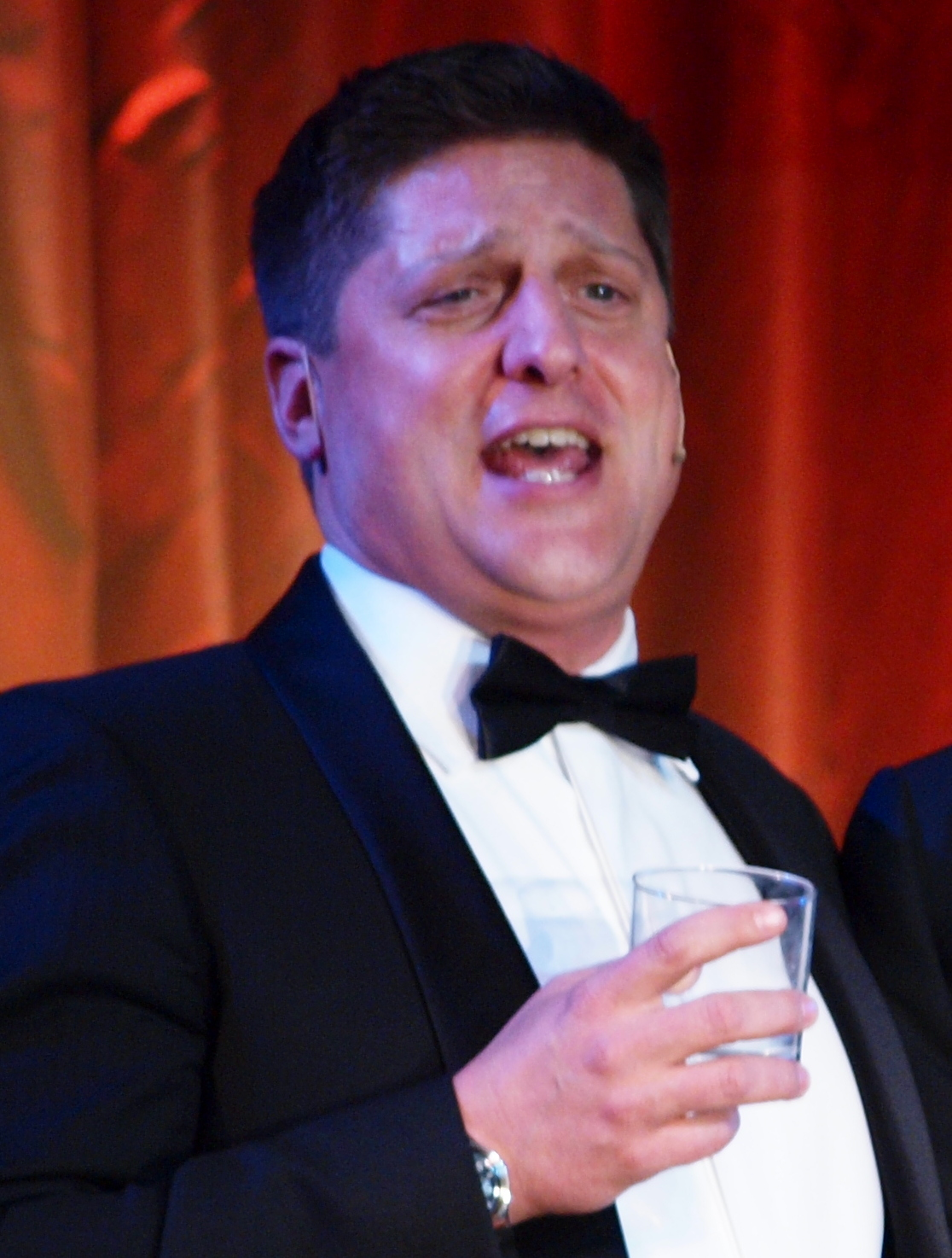
- Sieber at the Drama League Benefit Gala Honoring Angela Lansbury, February 8, 2010
- Born: Christopher Luverne Sieber; February 18, 1969 (age 57); St. Paul, Minnesota, U.S.
- Other name: Chris Sieber
- Education: American Musical and Dramatic Academy
- Occupations: Actor; singer
- Years active: 1996–present
- Spouse: Kevin Burrows (m. 2011)

Christopher Luverne Sieber (born February 18, 1969) is an American actor. Known primarily for his extensive roles on stage in musicals, he has received nominations for two Tony Awards, two Drama Desk Awards, and two Outer Critics Circle Awards.

He was twice nominated for the Tony Award for Best Featured Actor in a Musical first at the 59th Tony Awards in 2005 for his portrayal of Sir Dennis Galahad in Spamalot, and then at the 63rd Tony Awards in 2009 for his portrayal of Lord Farquaad in Shrek the Musical. He recently starred in Broadway productions of The Prom (2018), Company (2021), and Death Becomes Her (2024).

== Early life and education ==
Christopher Sieber was born in St. Paul, Minnesota, to Fred and Caron Sieber. He is the middle child of three. Mike, his older brother, was a swimmer, and his younger brother, Marc, was in drama alongside him. He is a 1988 graduate of Forest Lake Area High School in Forest Lake, Minnesota, and was inducted into the Forest Lake Schools Hall of Fame in June 2011. After graduating, Sieber went to New York City to study at the American Musical and Dramatic Academy.

== Career ==
=== Stage ===
Sieber made his Off-Broadway debut in a production of the musical A Christmas Carol in 1994. Sieber has appeared in several Broadway musicals, including Into the Woods, Monty Python's Spamalot, Shrek The Musical and Company. For his roles in Spamalot and Shrek The Musical, Sieber was nominated for the Tony Award for Best Featured Actor in a Musical, first at the 59th Tony Awards in 2005 and then at the 63rd Tony Awards in 2009.

On June 1, 2007, Sieber sang tenor in the world premiere of Eric Idle's Not the Messiah (He's a Very Naughty Boy) in Toronto.

On January 31, 2014, it was announced that Sieber would be joining the company of Matilda the Musical on Broadway as Miss Agatha Trunchbull starting performances on March 18. However, due to a hand injury sustained in rehearsals, he did not start performances until April 18.

In 2016, Sieber joined the cast of The Prom as Trent Oliver in the out-of-town tryout at Atlanta's Alliance Theatre, and continued in the role at Broadway's Longacre Theatre from October 2018 to August 11, 2019.

On March 4, 2024, it was announced that Sieber would join the cast of Death Becomes Her as Ernest Menville in its preview run at Chicago's Cadillac Palace Theatre. Performances started on April 30, 2024, before the show transferred to Broadway later that year.

=== Television ===
In 1998, Sieber made his television debut playing Kevin Burke, father to Mary-Kate Burke (Mary-Kate Olsen) and Ashley Burke (Ashley Olsen) on the ABC sitcom Two of a Kind. The series lasted for one season before its cancellation. From 2003 to 2004, Sieber returned to ABC for It's All Relative, in which he and John Benjamin Hickey played Simon Banks and Philip Stoddard, same-sex parents to Liz Stoddard-Banks (Maggie Lawson); other co-stars in the series included Reid Scott, Harriet Sansom Harris, and Lenny Clarke. In 2007, Sieber portrayed an eccentric zoologist for NBC comedy pilot Wildlife, which was not ordered by the network. In 2010, Sieber led the ABC comedy pilot It Takes a Village alongside Leah Remini and Cheyenne Jackson. In addition to these roles, Sieber has also had guest-starring roles in series such as Sex and the City, Pushing Daisies, Law & Order: Special Victims Unit, and several episodes of The Good Wife.

== Personal life ==
While It's All Relative was being produced, Sieber came out as gay and said that he was happily partnered to actor and chef Kevin Burrows. They married on November 24, 2011, in New York City. The couple live on an island on Lake Tamarack in the Stockholm area of Hardyston Township, New Jersey.

Sieber is involved with Broadway Cares/Equity Fights AIDS (BC/EFA) and has appeared in several of its Broadway Cares revues, among other events the charity produces. He teaches classes on drama and performance.

== Acting credits ==
=== Film ===
Year	Title	Role	Notes
2010	See You in September	Steven	
2010	Morning Glory	Groundhog Reporter	
2014	Are You Joking?	Allen Brown	

=== Television ===
Year	Title	Role	Notes
1998-99	Two of a Kind	Kevin Burke	Main cast; 22 episodes
2000	Sex and the City	Kevin	Episode: "Attack of the 5'10" Woman"
2000	Ed	Bob Crickmore	Episode: "Pretty Girls and Waffles"
2003-04	It's All Relative	Simon Banks	Main cast; 22 episodes
2007	Pushing Daisies	Napoleon LeNez	Episode: "Smell of Success"
2011-16	The Good Wife	Neil Howard Sloan-Jacob	2 episodes
2013	Elementary	Carter Lydon	Episode: "Possibility Two"
2015	Law & Order: Special Victims Unit	Frank Baker	Episode: "Patrimonial Burden"
2018	The Good Fight	Neil Howard Sloan-Jacob	Episode: "Day 492"
2021	Blue Bloods	Mike Dougherty	Episode: "The Common Good"

=== Theatre ===
Year	Title	Role	Theater	Ref.
1990	Anything Goes	Billy Crocker	National Tour	
1993	Bye Bye Birdie	Albert Peterson	National Tour	
1994	A Christmas Carol	Punch & Judy Man; Young Jacob Marley / Undertaker	Hulu Theater, Off-Broadway	
1995	Faust	Angel Rick	La Jolla Playhouse	
1996	Jesus Christ Superstar	Judas Iscariot	The Muny	
1996	Guys and Dolls	Benny Southstreet	The Muny	
1996	The Boys in the Band	Donald	Lucille Lortel Theatre, Off-Broadway	
1997-98	Triumph of Love	Agis	Royale Theatre, Broadway	
1998-99	Beauty and the Beast	Gaston	Palace Theatre, Broadway	
1999-2001	Beauty and the Beast	Gaston	Lunt-Fontanne Theatre, Broadway	
2000	Avow	Brian	New York City Center, Off-Broadway	
2002	Into the Woods	The Wolf / Rapunzel's Prince u/s Cinderella's Prince	Ahmanson Theatre	
2002	Into the Woods	The Wolf / Rapunzel's Prince u/s Cinderella's Prince	Broadhurst Theatre, Broadway	
2003	Thoroughly Modern Millie	Mr. Trevor Graydon III	Marquis Theatre, Broadway	
2004	Chicago	Billy Flynn	Ambassador Theatre, Broadway	
2004	Company	Robert	Freud Playhouse	
2004	Cinderella	Prince Topher	Koch Theater, New York City Opera	
2004-05	Spamalot	Sir Dennis Galahad / The Black Knight / Prince Herbert's Father	Shubert Theatre	
2005-08	Spamalot	Sir Dennis Galahad / The Black Knight / Prince Herbert's Father	Shubert Theatre, Broadway	
2005-08	Spamalot	Sir Dennis Galahad / The Black Knight / Prince Herbert's Father	Palace Theatre, West End	
2005	On the Twentieth Century	Bruce Granit	New Amsterdam Theatre, Concert	
2008	Camelot	Sir Dinadan	Lincoln Center, New York Philharmonic	
2008	Shrek the Musical	Lord Farquaad	5th Avenue Theatre	
2008-10	Shrek the Musical	Lord Farquaad	Broadway Theatre, Broadway	
2010	The Kid	Dan Savage	Acorn Theatre, Off-Broadway	
2010	Hairspray	Edna Turnblad	Paper Mill Playhouse	
2011	La Cage aux Folles	Georges	Longacre Theatre, Broadway	
2011	Chicago	Billy Flynn	Ambassador Theatre, Broadway	
2011-12	La Cage aux Folles	Albin	National Tour	
2012-13	Chicago	Billy Flynn	Ambassador Theatre, Broadway	
2013	Violet	Preacher / Bus Driver / Radio Singer	New York City Center, Encores!	
2013	Pippin	Charlemagne / Charles the Great	Music Box Theatre, Broadway	
2014	Pippin	Charlemagne / Charles the Great	Music Box Theatre, Broadway	
2014-16	Matilda the Musical	Miss Agatha Trunchbull	Shubert Theatre, Broadway	
2014	The Heart of Robin Hood	Pierre	American Repertory Theatre	
2016	The Prom	Trent Oliver	Alliance Theatre	
2016-17	Chicago	Billy Flynn	Ambassador Theatre, Broadway	
2017	Big River	The Duke	New York City Center, Encores!	
2017	Jesus Christ Superstar	King Herod	The Muny	
2017	Annie	Oliver "Daddy" Warbucks	Paper Mill Playhouse	
2018	Candide	Narrator / Pangloss	Alliance Theatre	
2018	Annie	Oliver "Daddy" Warbucks	The Muny	
2018	The Prom	Trent Oliver	Longacre Theatre, Broadway	
2019	Cinderella	Sebastian	Paper Mill Playhouse	
2020-22	Company	Harry	Bernard B. Jacobs Theatre, Broadway	
2023	The Goodbye Girl	Character Actor	Theatre Row Building, Off-Broadway	
2023	Gutenberg! The Musical!	The Producer (One night cameo)	James Earl Jones Theatre, Broadway	
2024	Death Becomes Her	Ernest Menville	Cadillac Palace Theatre	
2024	The Little Mermaid	Chef Louis	The Muny	
2024-26	Death Becomes Her	Ernest Menville	Lunt-Fontanne Theatre, Broadway	
2025	Hello, Dolly!	Horace Vandergelder	Carnegie Hall	
2025	Bat Boy: The Musical	Dr. Thomas Parker	New York City Center, Off-Broadway	

== Discography ==
- "What I Wanna Be When I Grow Up" by Scott Alan, singing the track Nothing More (2010)

== Awards and nominations ==
Year	Award	Category	Work	Result
2005	Tony Award	Best Featured Actor in a Musical	Spamalot	Nominated
2009	Tony Award	Best Featured Actor in a Musical	Shrek the Musical	Nominated
2009	Drama Desk Award	Outstanding Featured Actor in a Musical	Shrek the Musical	Nominated
2009	Outer Critics Circle Award	Outstanding Actor in a Musical	Shrek the Musical	Nominated
2012	Drama Desk Award	Outstanding Actor in a Musical	The Kid	Nominated
2025	Outer Critics Circle Award	Outstanding Featured Performer in a Broadway Musical	Death Becomes Her	Nominated
