= David Abeles =

American actor and singer

- Occupation(s): Actor, singer
- Years active: 2005–present
- Known for: Harry Potter and the Cursed Child

David Abeles is an American actor. He is most well known for originating the role of Eamon in Once and portraying Ron Weasley in Harry Potter and the Cursed Child, both on Broadway. He also portrayed Miss Trunchbull in the US national tour of Matilda the Musical and replaced Dave Malloy as Pierre Bezukhov in the Off-Broadway production of Natasha, Pierre and the Great Comet of 1812.

== Acting credits ==
=== Theatre ===
| Year(s) | Production | Role | Location | Notes |
|---|---|---|---|---|
| 2005 | On the Razzle | Constable | Williamstown Theatre Festival | Regional |
| 2006 | Henry and Mudge | u/s Dad u/s Mudge | US tour | |
| 2007-2008 | My Fair Lady | Ensemble u/s Professor Henry Higgins | US tour | |
| 2010-2011 | Million Dollar Quartet | u/s Jerry Lee Lewis | Nederlander Theatre | Broadway |
| 2011-2012 | Once | Eamon | New York Theatre Workshop | Off-Broadway |
| 2012-2013 | Once | Eamon | Bernard B. Jacobs Theatre | Broadway |
| 2013 | Natasha, Pierre and the Great Comet of 1812 | Pierre Bezukhov | Kazino | Off-Broadway |
| 2013-2014 | Natasha, Pierre and the Great Comet of 1812 | Pierre Bezukhov | Kazino at Times Square | Off-Broadway |
| 2014 | The Unsinkable Molly Brown | Erich u/s J.J. | Denver Center Theatre Company | Regional |
| 2015 | Incident at Vichy | Waiter | Pershing Square Signature Center | Off-Broadway |
| 2016 | Matilda the Musical | Miss Trunchbull | US tour | |
| 2016-2017 | In Transit | Dave u/s Nate | Circle in the Square Theatre | Broadway |
| 2017 | The Unsinkable Molly Brown | Erich | The Muny | Regional |
| 2018-2019 | Harry Potter and the Cursed Child | Ensemble | Lyric Theatre | Broadway |
| 2019-2020 | Harry Potter and the Cursed Child | Ron Weasley | Curran Theatre | |
| 2021-2023 | Harry Potter and the Cursed Child | Ron Weasley | Lyric Theatre | Broadway |
| 2022 | The Pirates of Penzance | Sergeant of Police | American Airlines Theatre | Concert |
| 2024 | Sinatra: The Musical | Ensemble | Apollo Theatre | Concert |
