= Sung-through =

Musical or opera with little or no spoken dialogue

A sung-through or through-sung work is a narrative work such as a stage musical, musical film or opera in which the entire libretto is set to music, with little or no spoken dialogue or monologues used to tell the story. The story is told through a combination of aria, arioso and recitative. Early versions of this include the Italian genre of opera buffa, a light-hearted form of opera that gained prominence in the 1750s. Since Jesus Christ Superstar, sung-through musicals have been increasingly popular, with one commentator writing, "Hamilton demonstrates ... that a sung-through musical can be as vigorous in its storytelling as any more traditional book musical."

== List of fully sung-through musicals ==
- Art Thief Musical!
- Bare: A Pop Opera
- Bumblescratch
- Cats
- Une chambre en ville
- Cricket
- Les Dix Commandements
- Evita
- Falsettos
- Hadestown
- Hamilton: An American Musical
- The Human Comedy
- Jesus Christ Superstar
- Joseph and the Amazing Technicolor Dreamcoat
- Katy! the Musical
- Keating!
- King David
- Marry Me a Little
- Metalocalypse: The Doomstar Requiem
- Les Misérables
- Miss Saigon
- Murder Ballad
- Natasha, Pierre & The Great Comet of 1812
- Notre-Dame de Paris
- Ordinary Days
- Quadrophenia
- Repo! The Genetic Opera
- Song and Dance
- Songs for a New World
- Starlight Express
- Starmania
- Tell Me on a Sunday
- The Ten Commandments: The Musical

== List of sung-through musicals with occasional spoken lines ==
- The Golden Apple
- A New Brain
- Next to Normal
- Once on This Island
- Seussical
- Side Show
- Suffs

== List of sung-through musicals depending on the production ==
- Chess Some productions have been completely sung-through, while some have had scattered lines, and some (notably the original Broadway production) were staged as book musicals.
- Jacques Brel is Alive and Well and Living in Paris

== See also ==
- Through-composed
