= Hélène Kuragina =

- War and Peace character
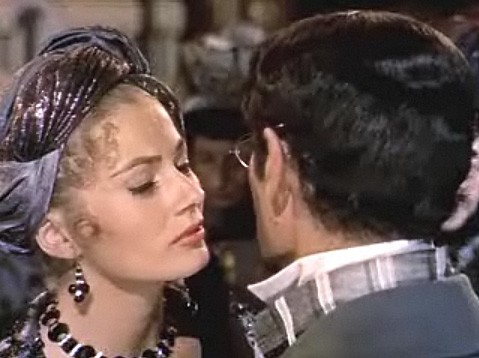
- Anita Ekberg from the trailer for the film War and Peace
- Created by: Leo Tolstoy
- Portrayed by: Anita Ekberg; Irina Skobtseva; Fiona Gaunt; Tuppence Middleton; Amber Gray; Cat Simmons; Lilli Cooper; Violante Placido; Carol Bezerra; Hiromu Kiriya

In-universe information
- Full name: Yelena Vasilyevna Kuragina
- Alias: the Queen of society
- Nickname: Hélène
- Gender: Female
- Title: Princess (by birth); Countess (by marriage)
- Family: Vasily Kuragin (father); Anatole Kuragin (brother); Hippolyte Kuragin (eldest brother)
- Spouse: Pierre Bezukhov
- Relatives: Catiche Bezukhova (cousin), Pierre Bezukhov (cousin)
- Religion: Russian Orthodox (by birth); Roman Catholic (convert)
- Nationality: Russian

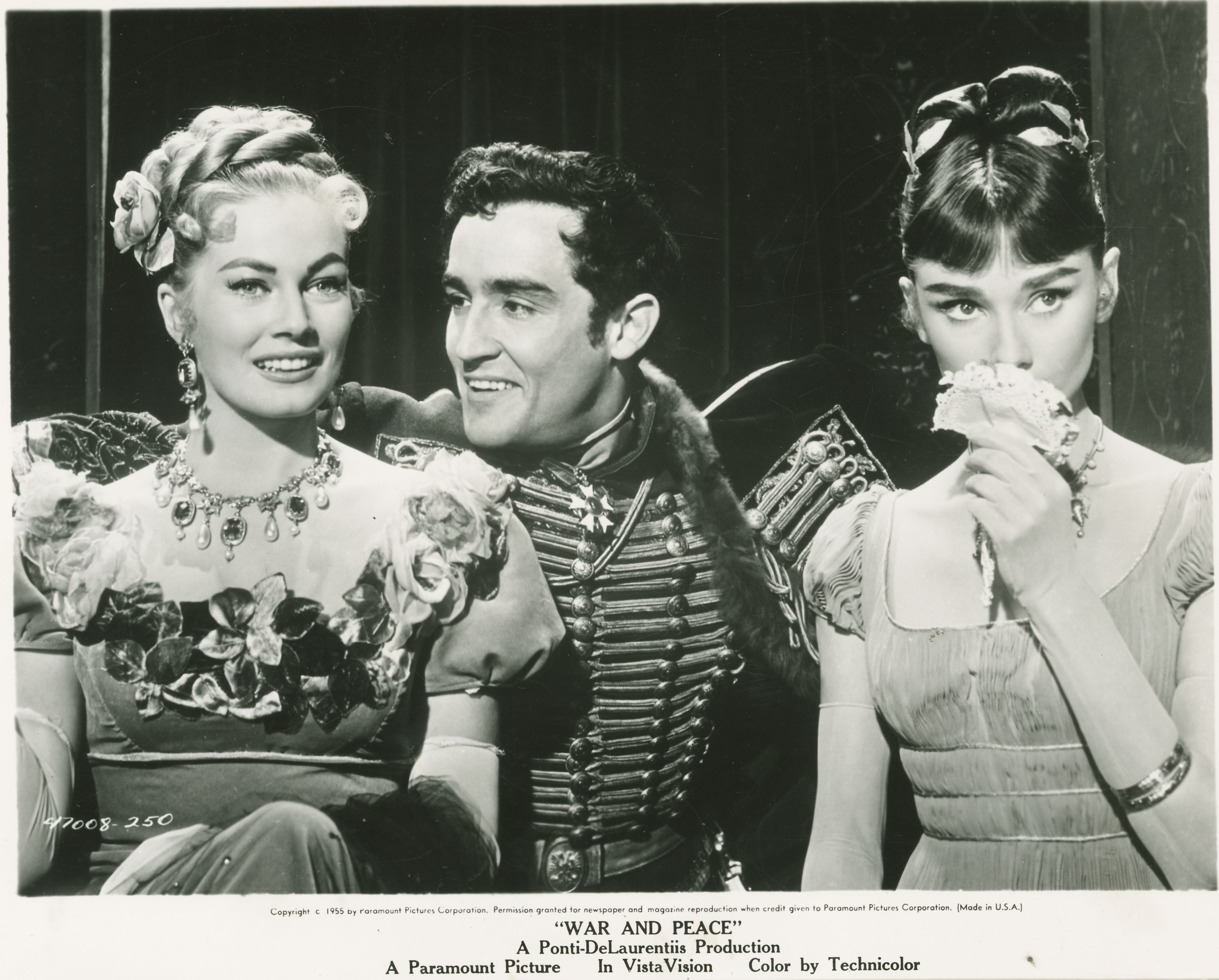
Publicity image for the 1956 film: Anita Ekberg as Hélène, Vittorio Gassman as Anatole, Audrey Hepburn as Natasha

Princess Yelena Vasilyevna "Hélène" Kuragina (Russian: Елена Васи́льевна "Эле́н" Кура́гина; later known as Hélène Bezukhova) is a fictional character in Leo Tolstoy's 1869 novel War and Peace and its various cinematic adaptations. She is played by Anita Ekberg in the 1956 film, by Amber Gray in the New York stage premiere of Natasha, Pierre & The Great Comet of 1812, and by Tuppence Middleton in the 2016 BBC miniseries.

== Biography ==
Hélène is described as being in her early to mid-twenties and is considered a great beauty. Within Petersburg society, she is considered very cultured and intelligent on account of her social graces, despite actually being quite vapid. Early in the novel, it is rumoured and later implied that Hélène has an incestuous relationship with her profligate brother, Anatole.

After Pierre Bezukhov is legitimised as the heir to his father's title and fortune, Hélène's father, Prince Vasily Kuragin, arranges for the two of them to be married. Despite finding Pierre odd, Hélène goes through with the marriage for the sake of social and financial advantage. Pierre is pressured by Prince Vassily and social expectation into the marriage, experiencing it as an inevitability, and sours on the match, especially after Hélène has an affair with their houseguest, the crude but fearless soldier Dolokhov, who flaunts the romance. Pierre fights Dolokhov in a duel, and by a stroke of luck wins by wounding him. Pierre sinks into depression, losing any love for his wife. He leaves her and goes to St. Petersburg. Hélène begs him to maintain the marriage, which he does only for the sake of not disappointing others, while she continues to engage in implied affairs, most notably with Boris Drubetskoy. Continuing to pursue her social ambitions, she frequently hosts dinner parties for the elite, and her salon becomes extremely popular. Later, she conspires with Anatole to help him in his pursuit of Natasha Rostova, to whom Anatole is powerfully attracted.

Late in the novel, Hélène forsakes the Russian Orthodox Church and adopts Catholicism, believing that a large donation to the church will lead the Pope to annul her union with Pierre so she can remarry. Soon afterward, Hélène becomes pregnant and then dies; it is implied that she died from a drug overdose in an attempted abortion.

== Title ==
The use of 'prince' and 'princess' in Russian novels is sometimes confusing to an English audience, who are accustomed to 'princesses' as the daughters of monarchs, or the wives of sovereign princes. In Eastern Europe, the title knyaz was anciently the chief of a Slavic tribe or ruler of a state; in 19th-century Russia, where War and Peace is set, the title knyaz was similar to, or above, a Western duke or a German Fürst, and it is conventionally translated as 'prince' even though the holder may not be descended from any sovereign. Helene is a kniazhna (daughter of a prince, viz. the knyaz Vasily Kuragin), which is conventionally translated as 'princess'.

== See also ==
- List of characters in War and Peace
