= Anatole Kuragin =

- War and Peace character
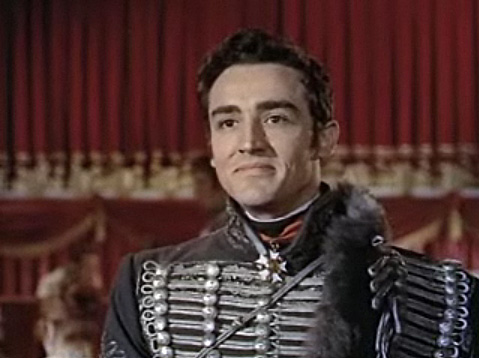
- Vittorio Gassman as Anatole in War and Peace (1956)
- Created by: Leo Tolstoy
- Portrayed by: Vittorio Gassman; Vasily Lanovoy; Colin Baker; Callum Turner; Lucas Steele; Jamie Muscato; Gabriel Leone; Ryosei Konishi

In-universe information
- Full name: Anatole Vasilyevich Kuragin
- Nicknames: Tolya, Toto
- Gender: Male
- Title: Prince (kniazhich)
- Family: Vasily Kuragin (father); Hélène Kuragina (sister); Hippolyte Kuragin (brother)
- Spouse: Unnamed Polish woman
- Significant others: Hélène Kuragina; Natasha Rostova; Maria Bolkonskaya
- Relatives: Catiche Mamontova (cousin), Pierre Bezukhov (cousin and brother in law)
- Religion: Russian Orthodox
- Nationality: Russian

Anatole Vasilyevich Kuragin (Russian: Анатолий (Анатоль) Васильевич Курагин) is a fictional character in Leo Tolstoy's 1869 novel War and Peace, its various cinematic adaptations, and an operatic adaptation as well.

== Title ==
The use of 'prince' in Russian novels is sometimes confusing to an English audience, who are accustomed to 'princes' as the close male relatives of monarchs, or monarchs of small states in their own right. In Eastern Europe, the title knyaz was anciently the chief of a Slavic tribe or ruler of a state; in 19th-century Russia, where War and Peace is set, the title knyaz was similar to, or above, a Western duke or a German Fürst, and it is conventionally translated as 'prince' even though the holder may not be descended from any sovereign. Anatole is a kniazhich (son of a prince, viz. the knyaz Vasily Kuragin). The title is usually translated as 'Prince' in English.

== Description ==
Anatole is Hélène Kuragina's wild-living brother and a soldier, although he is rarely seen out of Russia in the book. It is rumoured that he has had an incestuous affair with his sister, and he tries to elope with Natasha Rostova despite being secretly married to a Polish woman during his time in the army. Later in the book, he gets his leg amputated at the Battle of Borodino, where he is treated next to Andrei Bolkonsky, Rostova's former betrothed.

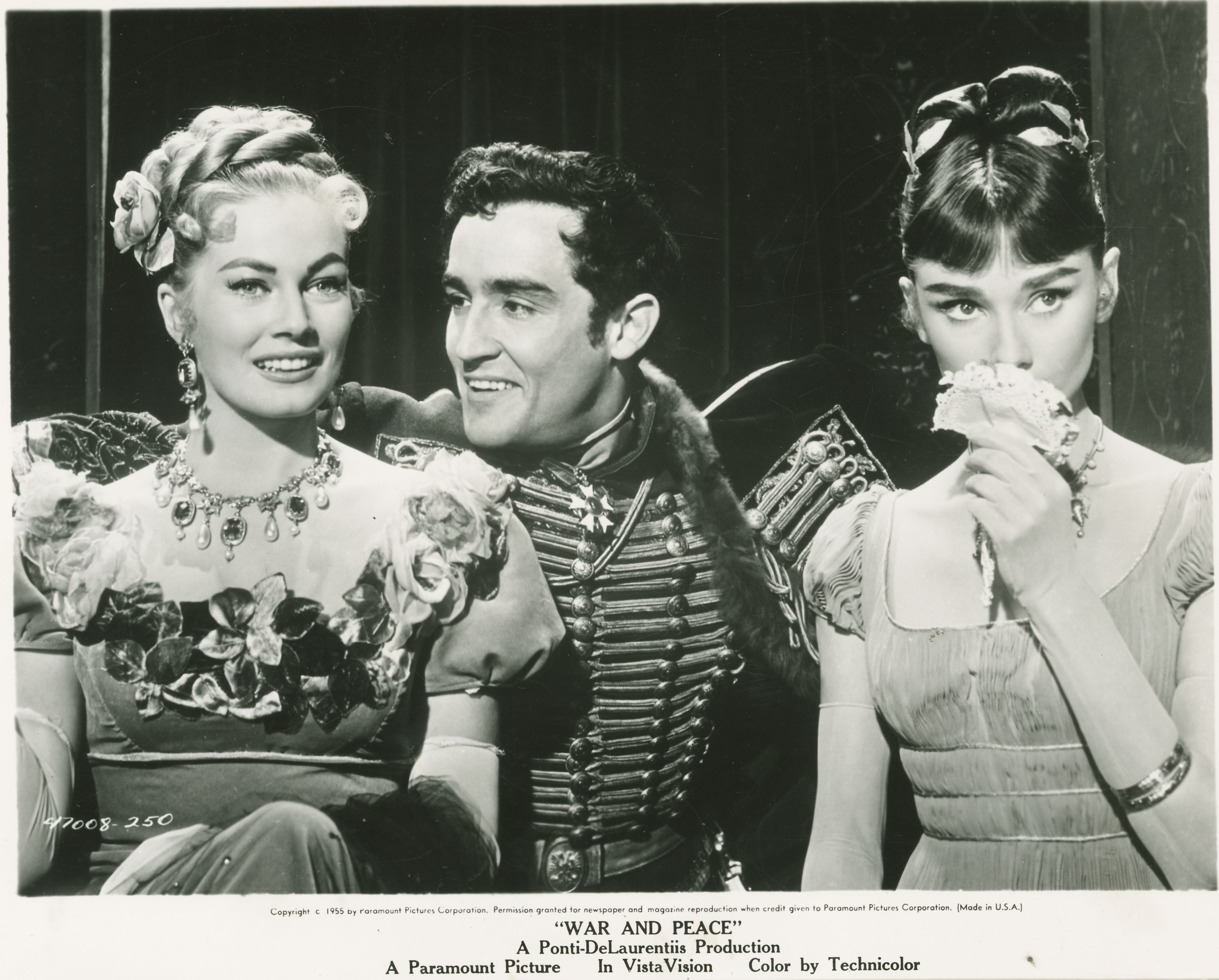
Publicity image for the 1956 film: Anita Ekberg as Hélène, Vittorio Gassman as Anatole, Audrey Hepburn as Natasha

== Development ==
While developing the novel, Tolstoy sketched a character named "Petr", "who passed through a complex evolution" and "was a precursor of both Pierre and Anatole Kuragin". Anatoly Shostak served as the real life inspiration for the fictional Anatole.

Esther Salaman argues that Tolstoy created Anatole "to a formula" as an exact opposite of himself. She notes that Tolstoy introduces Anatole with an explicit "inventory" of his characteristics, a technique not typical of Tolstoy, and that in every given aspect Anatole's character is the reverse of Tolstoy's own. We learn from the outset that Anatole is not a gambler, that he is neither ambitious nor vain, and that he honestly considered himself irreproachable. Yet, as Salaman writes, Tolstoy himself "was a gambler, he was vain, never indifferent to what other people thought of him, ambitious, sometimes miserly."

== Screen and stage portrayals ==
Anatole is played in the 1956 American film by Vittorio Gassman; in the 1966-67 Soviet film, by Vasili Lanovoy; in the 1972-73 BBC miniseries, by Colin Baker. In the 2007 version, he is portrayed by German actor Ken Duken, and in the 2016 BBC series by Callum Turner. He was also portrayed by Lucas Steele and Jamie Muscato in productions of the musical Natasha, Pierre & The Great Comet of 1812.

== See also ==
- List of characters in War and Peace
