= Ars Nova (theater) =

Off-Broadway theatre in New York City

Coordinates: 40.76757°N 73.99055°W

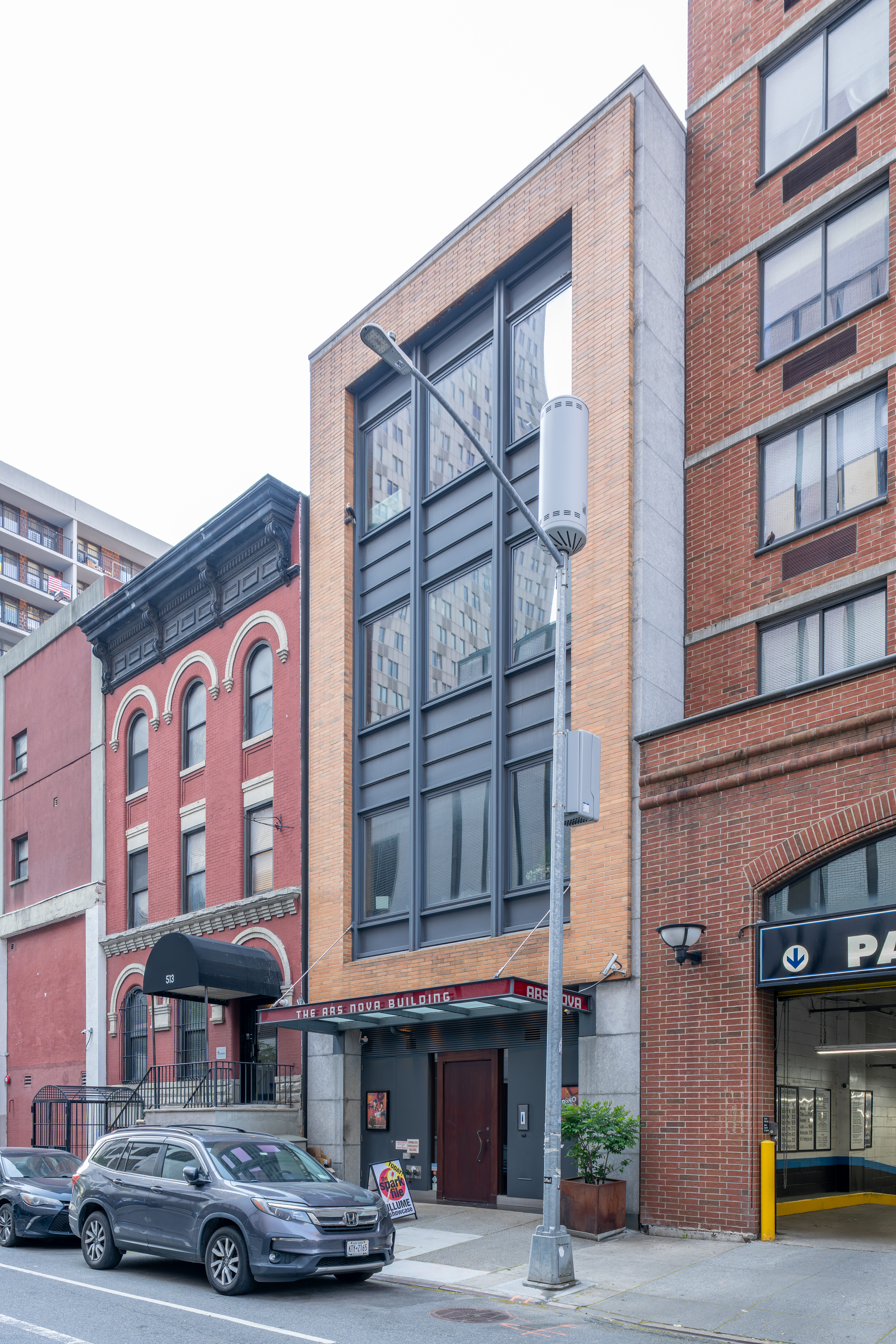
- (2026)
- Interactive map of Ars Nova
- Address: 511 West 54th Street; New York City; United States
- Capacity: 99
- Type: Off-Broadway
- Designation: New York City Landmark

Construction
- Opened: 2002

Website
- arsnovanyc.com

Ars Nova is an Off-Broadway, non-profit theater in New York City's Hell's Kitchen neighborhood. Ars Nova develops and produces theater, comedy and music created by artists in the early stages of their careers. Besides its Off-off Broadway home in Hell's Kitchen, Ars Nova also operates the former Barrow Street Theatre at Greenwich House as a space for Off-Broadway productions.

The theater was founded in 2002 in memory of Gabe Wiener, a music producer who died at the age of 26, by his sister, Jenny Steingart and her husband Jon Steingart. The theater's mission is to provide a venue for smart, surprising new work from emerging artists.

== Mainstage productions ==
=== Past mainstage productions ===
Past Ars Nova productions include Game Play, Eager to Lose, Core Values, The Netflix Plays, Natasha, Pierre and the Great Comet of 1812, The Urban Dictionary Plays, The Lapsburgh Layover, Be a Good Little Widow, The Wii Plays, Now Circa Then, Bloodsong of Love, Missed Connections NYC, Sax & Dixon: We Thee Wed, Mel & El: Show & Tell, Two Girls for Five Bucks and the Ten Dollar Heartbreakers, Playlist, Jollyship the Whiz-Bang, Boom, From up Here, Dixie's Tupperware Party, At Least It's Pink, 25 Questions for a Jewish Mother, Holy Cross Sucks!, Freestyle Love Supreme, The Wau Wau Sisters, and The Woodsman.

=== Film and television production ===
Ars Nova produces films and television series under Ars Nova Entertainment, most notably the 2009 film Black Dynamite. The company was associated with Cartoon Network at one point, producing an animated Black Dynamite series as well as a pilot by collaborator Freestyle Love Supreme for its programming block Adult Swim.

== Programs and series ==
In addition to its mainstage theatrical productions, the theater produces a number of series, festivals and programs.

=== 54/10 Music Marathon ===
In 2010, Ars Nova began its annual summer music marathon, 54/10, named for the theater's location at the cross streets of 54th Street and 10th Avenue. Past acts have included Clydesdale Erotic, Justin Levine, Langhorne Slim, Semi Precious Weapons, Jay Brannan, The Woes, The Defibulators, Cynthia Hopkins, and The Spring Standards. In 2013, the festival continued as an integrated part of ANT Fest.

=== ANT Fest ===
In 2008, Ars Nova premiered its All New Talent Festival, or ANT Fest. The festival ran from October 16 through November 24 and showcased the work of 175 new artists. ANT Fest has since become an annual event, lasting for 30 nights and giving early-career artists a forum to present original material in front of a New York audience. Each show is given only one performance in order to allow for greater risk taking and the development of as many new artists as possible over the 30 night period. As of 2012, the festival has been moved from fall to summer.

In 2013, ANT Fest combined with the 54/10 music festival, with upcoming bands featured twice per week in the evenings after regular ANT Fest shows.

=== Showgasm ===
Showgasm is a monthly variety show. It showcases short works (five minutes or less) by young artists who have not yet developed a full-length show, as well providing a venue for veteran Ars Nova artists to showcase new material.

=== Uncharted ===
Uncharted is a music series for up-and-coming musical theater writers to showcase original work through concerts.

In 2013, Ars Nova added a new Uncharted writer's group modeled after Play Group. Curated by Kent Nicholson, the group brings together rising composers and writers monthly to workshop and develop new musicals.

=== Out Loud ===
The Out Loud series connects emerging playwrights with professional directors to help facilitate the writer’s creative process and contribute to his/her professional development. The majority of the plays produced during Out Loud come from members of Ars Nova's Play Group.

=== The Writer's Room ===
In 2012, the Manhattan Theatre Club launched The Studio at Stage II, with the intention of producing new works at the New York City Center. As a part of this program, the Manhattan Theatre Club teamed up with Ars Nova to create the Writer's Room. Together, the two theater groups will jointly select four playwrights per year to receive Writer’s Room Commissions. The commissioned writers will then come together to participate in a program designed to encourage artistic risk taking and provide developmental support.

=== Play Group ===
The Play Group is a coalition of emerging playwrights, who meet on a biweekly basis to develop and discuss their works-in-progress. If accepted into the two-year program, the writers are given a chance to develop their plays with peer support and input, culminating in a public reading of their completed works. In addition to receiving support from the other Play Group members and Ars Nova staff, participants gain access to Ars Nova's network of artists, tickets to Ars Nova productions and the opportunity to participate in the Out Loud reading series and annual Play Group project.

=== Artists-In-Residence ===
The Artist in Residence program provides emerging directors, designers, composers, and playwrights with an artistic home for one year. Ars Nova's 2012 Artists in Residence are The Debate Society (Company-in-Residence), Portia Krieger (Director-in-Residence) and Shaina Taub (Composer-in-Residence). Each resident has access to the Ars Nova staff and resources, in return for providing expertise and assistance with artistic planning and production. Residents are also often commissioned to develop new work for the Ars Nova stage.

=== Summer retreat ===
Each summer, the theater funds a group of artists to attend a week long retreat outside of New York City. The retreat is divided into focused work sessions, group discussions and social activities.

== Awards and honors ==
In 2008, the Village Voice awarded Ars Nova its "Best Theater Concessions" honor, commenting that "Ars Nova satisfies those few disconsolate [theater concession consumers] among us: In addition to reasonably priced cocktails, it features snacks thematically linked with the play on offer."

Ars Nova's commissioned production of Natasha, Pierre and the Great Comet of 1812 won several awards and nominations, including the Richard Rodgers Award for Musical Theater, a Special Citation from the OBIE awards, and five Drama Desk nominations.

== Notable alumni ==
- Joe Iconis
- Jesse Eisenberg
- Jesse Tyler Ferguson
- Jack McBrayer
- Alex Timbers
- Reggie Watts
- Lin-Manuel Miranda
- Celine Song
- Branden Jacobs-Jenkins
- Annie Baker
- Justin Kuritzkes
- Sarah DeLappe
- Edward W. Hardy
- John Gallagher Jr.
- Beau Willimon
- Liz Meriwether
- Semi Precious Weapons
- Michael Patrick King
- Carly Mensch
- Liz Flahive
- Kristoffer Diaz
- Samuel D. Hunter
