= Elliot Norton Awards =

Boston-area theatre awards

The Elliot Norton Awards are presented annually to honor the best achievements in Boston-area theater. The genesis of the awards was the Norton Medal, which was first awarded in 1983 and was named after long-time theater critic Elliot Norton (1903–2003), a 1922 graduate of Boston Latin School, who had retired in 1982 after 48 years as a Boston theater critic. In addition to bestowing awards on the best theatrical productions and theatrical personnel, the Elliot Awards include a Lifetime Achievement Award and the Norton Prize for Sustained Excellence.

The awards are voted on annually by the Boston Theater Critics Association, which bestows the honors at an annual ceremony that features a guest of honor. Guests of honor have included Edward Albee, Julie Harris, Ian McKellen, Al Pacino, Jason Robards, and August Wilson.

== Elliot Norton ==
During Norton’s career, he covered more than 6000 productions over 48 years. Norton hosted “Elliot Norton Reviews” on WGBH-TV for 24 years. Norton received a special Tony Award, the George Jean Nathan Award for Dramatic Criticism, and the George Foster Peabody Award for “Elliot Norton Reviews.” In 1988 he was inducted into the Theater Hall of Fame. He died in 2003 at the age of 100 and participated in the selection of awardees until well into his 90s.
