= Pierre Bezukhov =

- War and Peace character
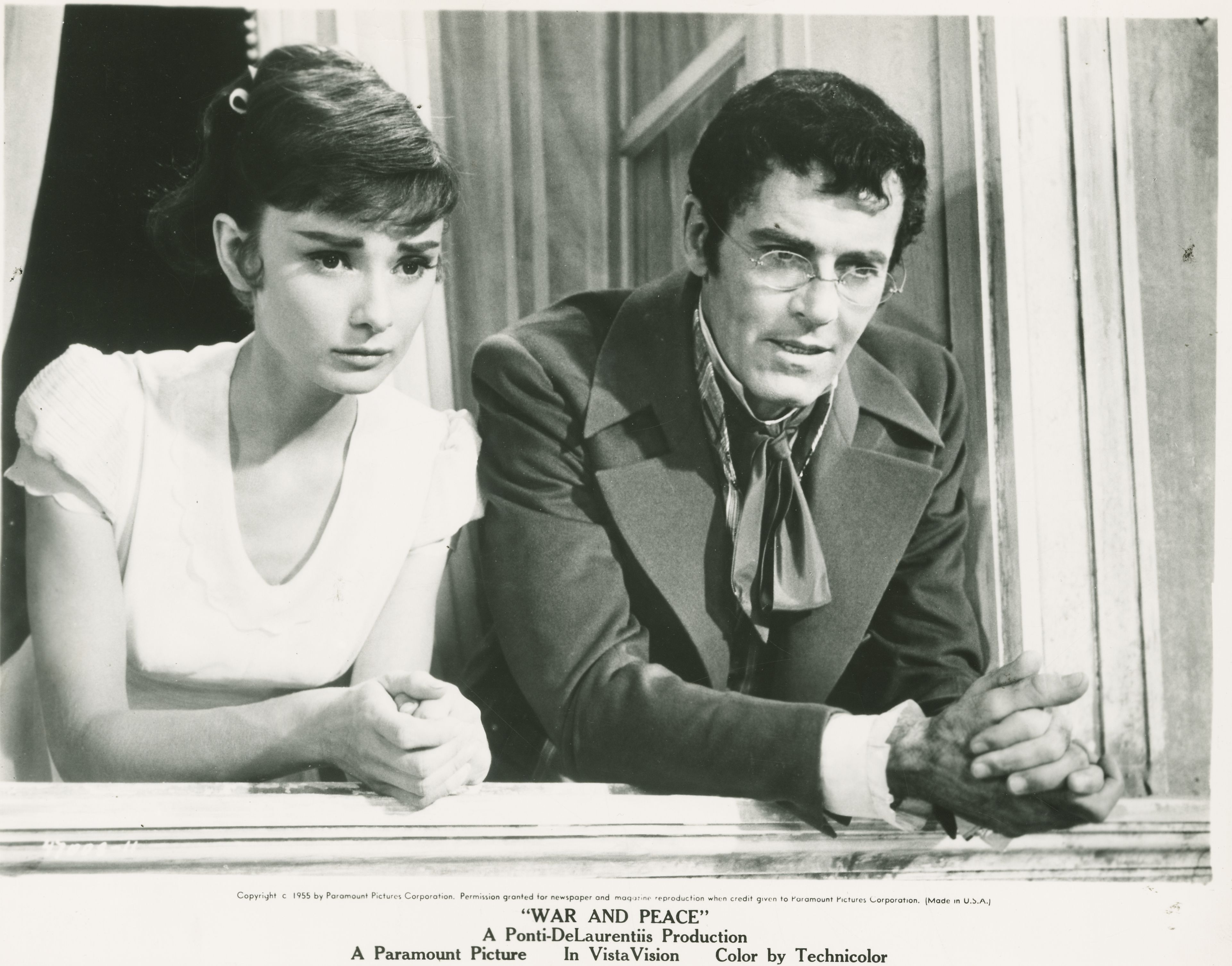
- Publicity image for the 1956 film: Audrey Hepburn as Natasha and Henry Fonda as Pierre
- Created by: Leo Tolstoy
- Based on: Tolstoy himself
- Portrayed by: Henry Fonda; Sergei Bondarchuk; Anthony Hopkins; Alexander Beyer; Paul Dano; Dave Malloy; Luke Holloway; David Abeles; Scott Stangland; Josh Groban; Okieriete Onaodowan; Declan Bennett

In-universe information
- Full name: Pyotr Kirillovich Bezukhov
- Nickname: Pierre
- Gender: Male
- Title: Count (Graf)
- Family: Kirill Bezukhov (father)
- Spouses: Hélène Kuragina (first wife); Natasha Rostova (second wife)
- Children: Masha, Lisa, Petya, and another girl
- Religion: Originally atheist, later a kind of Christian anarchist
- Origin: Saint Petersburg
- Nationality: Russian

Count Pyotr Kirillovich "Pierre" Bezukhov (/bɛ.zjuːˈkɒv/; Russian: Пётр Кири́ллович "Пьер" Безу́хов) is the fictional protagonist of Leo Tolstoy's 1869 novel War and Peace. He is the favourite out of several illegitimate sons of the wealthy nobleman Count Kirill Vladimirovich Bezukhov, one of the richest people in the Russian Empire. Pierre is best friends with Andrei Bolkonsky. Tolstoy based Pierre, more than any other War and Peace character, on himself.

== Life and description ==
Pierre is described as the large-bodied, ungainly and socially awkward illegitimate son of an old Russian graf (count). He is educated in France and returns to Russia as a misfit. His unexpected inheritance of a large fortune makes him socially desirable. Pierre is ensnared by the fortune-hunting Hélène Kuragina, whose eventual deception leaves him depressed and confused, spurring a spiritual odyssey that spans the novel.

At the opening of the novel, Pierre is a young man who has recently returned to Russia to seek a career after completing his education abroad. Although a well-meaning, kind hearted young man, he is awkward and out of place in the Russian high society in whose circles he starts to move. Pierre, though intelligent, is not dominated by reason, as his friend Prince Andrei Nikolayevich Bolkonsky is. His lack of direction leads him to fall in with a group of profligate young men like Anatole Kuragin and Dolokhov whose pranks and heavy drinking cause mild scandals. After a particularly outrageous escapade in which a policeman is strapped to the back of a bear and thrown into a river, Pierre is sent away from St. Petersburg.

Pierre's life changes after he becomes the sole heir to his father's vast estate, and his position in society is changed from that of an illegitimate son to the new Count Bezukhov. His inability to control his emotions and sexual passions lead him into a marriage with the vapid but sensually beautiful Princess Hélène, a match which her self-serving father, Prince Vasily, sets up to secure his access to Pierre's newly acquired vast fortune. Hélène is not in love with Pierre, and has affairs. From jealousy, Pierre shoots her suspected lover, Dolokhov, in a duel. He is distraught at having committed such a crime and eventually separates from Hélène and then becomes a Freemason. His madcap escape into the city of Moscow and his subsequent obsessive belief that he is destined to be Napoleon’s assassin show his submission to irrational impulses. Yet his search for meaning in his life and for how to overcome his emotions are a central theme of the novel. He eventually finds love and peace with Natasha Rostova and their marriage is perhaps the culmination of a life of moral and spiritual questioning. They have four children: three girls and one boy.

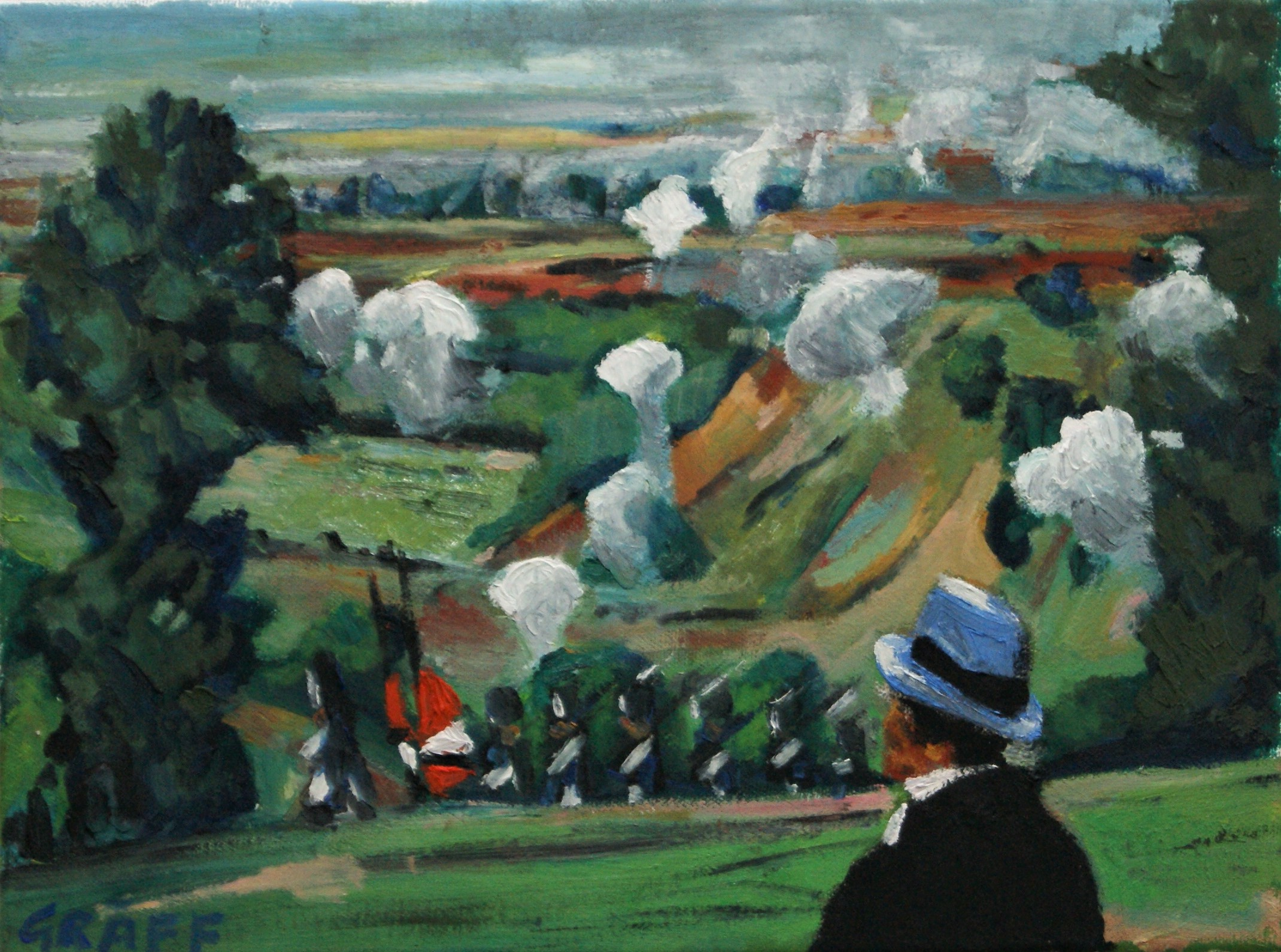
Painting of Bezhukhov visiting the Battle of Borodino, Matthias Laurenz Gräff (2020)

Daniel Rancour-Laferriere calls Pierre "one of the best known characters in world literature." Merriam-Webster lists him among "the most attractive and sympathetic characters in literature". And M. Keith Booker describes Pierre as one of Tolstoy's "most memorable characters".

In publicity for the BBC's 2016 adaptation he is described as follows:

Pierre is an outcast. The awkward, illegitimate son of a dazzlingly wealthy Count, he was educated in France but returns to Russia now that his father’s health is in decline. Polite society shuns him for his hero-worship of Napoleon and enthusiasm for the politics of revolution. But his blundering sincerity charms Andrei, his truest friend; and Natasha, who delights in his presence. He is quickly married off by stealth through the manipulation of others around him and is likely to face further heartache given that his wife prefers bedding her brother. It looks like this unlikely hero is smitten with his friend Natasha Rostova but is set for heartache given his kind and gentle nature.

== See also ==
- List of characters in War and Peace
