= IRNE Awards =

Boston-area theater award

- Date: 1997
- Location: Boston Massachusetts, United States
- Presented by: Independent Reviewers of New England
- Website: www.irneawards.com

The IRNE Awards are presented annually by the Independent Reviewers of New England (IRNE) to honor the best achievements in Boston-area theater.

== Categories ==
- Best New Play Small Stage
- Best Set Design Small Stage
- Best Costume Design Small Stage
- Best Lighting Design Small Stage
- Best Projection Design Small Stage
- Best Sound Design Small Stage
- Best Choreography Small Stage
- Best Solo Performance Small Stage
- Ensemble Small Stage
- Best Supporting Actress–Play–Fringe
- Best Supporting Actor–Play–Fringe
- Best Actress–Play–Fringe
- Best Actor–Play–Fringe
- Best Supporting Actress–Play–Midsize
- Best Supporting Actor–Play–Midsize
- Best Actress–Play–Midsize
- Best Actor–Play–Midsize
- Best Supporting Actress–Musical Small Stage
- Best Supporting Actor– Musical Small Stage
- Best Actress–Musical Small Stage
- Best Actor – Musical Small Stage
- Music Director Small Stage
- Best Director–Play–Fringe
- Best Director–Play–Midsize
- Best Director–Musical Small Stage
- Best Musical Small Stage
- Best Play–Fringe
- Best Play–Midsize
- Best Young Performer Small Stage
- Best New Play Large Stage
- Best New Musical Large Stage
- Best Set Design Large Stage
- Best Costume Design Large Stage
- Best Lighting Design Large Stage
- Best Sound Design Large Stage
- Best Projection Design Large Stage
- Best Choreography Large Stage
- Best Solo Performance Large Stage
- Best Ensemble Large Stage
- Best Supporting Actress-Musical Large Stage
- Best Supporting Actor-Musical Large Stage
- Best Actress-Musical Large Stage
- Best Actor-Musical Large Stage
- Best Supporting Actress-Play Large Stage
- Best Supporting Actor-Play Large Stage
- Best Actress-Play Large Stage
- Best Actor-Play Large Stage
- Best Music Director Large Stage
- Best Visiting Production- Large Stage
- Best Visiting Actress Large Stage
- Best Visiting Actor Large Stage
- Best Director-Musical Large Stage
- Best Director-Play Large Stage
- Best Musical Large Stage
- Best Play Large Stage
- Best Young Performer Large Stage
