= Oree Originol =

American artist (b. 1984)

- Born: 1984 (age 41–42); Los Angeles, California, United States
- Occupations: Visual artist, activist
- Known for: Poster art
- Website: oree.art

Oree Originol (born 1984) is an American visual artist and activist, working in the San Francisco Bay Area. His portraits of victims of police violence have been used in social justice demonstrations. Originol's work has been included in exhibits at the Smithsonian American Art Museum, the Yerba Buena Center for the Arts, the San Francisco Museum of Modern Art (SFMOMA), and the Oakland Museum of California.

== Career ==
Oree Originol was born in 1984, in Los Angeles, California, where he was also raised. Originol's parents are immigrants from Mexico.

He moved from Los Angeles to the Oakland, California in 2009 to show his work in San Francisco Bay Area galleries. In 2012, Originol joined Culture/Strike, an arts-activism nonprofit led by Favianna Rodriguez. At roughly the same time, he also met prolific, political poster artists from the Dignidad Rebelde collaboration, Jesus Barraza and Melanie Cervantes.

In 2012, the Justseeds Artists' Cooperative included his work a published portfolio or handmade prints, Migration Now.

In 2015, the nonprofit organization BRIDGEGOOD featured Originol's work on their region-wide digital media campaign, Inspire Oakland. In December 2020, BRIDGEGOOD honored him at their annual fundraising celebration, RESILIENCE.

Originol began creating black-and-white portraits of victims of police violence following a 2013 vigil for Oscar Grant. He went on to create many more portraits and makes them free for download from his Justice for Our Lives project.
