= Killing of Sean Monterrosa =

2020 police shooting of a Latino American man in Vallejo, California

- Location of Vallejo, California.
- Date: June 2, 2020
- Time: c. 12:30 a.m. (PDT, UTC−08:00)
- Location: Vallejo, California, US; 38.1230°N 122.2498°W
- Type: Homicide
- Participants: Jarrett Tonn
- Deaths: Sean Monterrosa
- Litigation: Federal Civil Rights Lawsuit

Sean Monterrosa was a 22-year-old Latino American man who was shot and killed on June 2, 2020, by Vallejo, California, police officer Jarrett Tonn. Monterrosa was on his knees and had his hands above his waist when Tonn shot him through the windshield of his unmarked police pickup truck. The police later said Tonn shot him because he erroneously believed a hammer in Monterrosa's pocket was a gun. Monterrosa later died at a local hospital.

The event sparked outrage in the Bay Area, particularly in Vallejo, which has a long history of police violence, excessive force complaints, and high-profile killings, including the February 2018 shooting of Ronnell Foster and the February 2019 shooting of Willie McCoy.

== Background ==
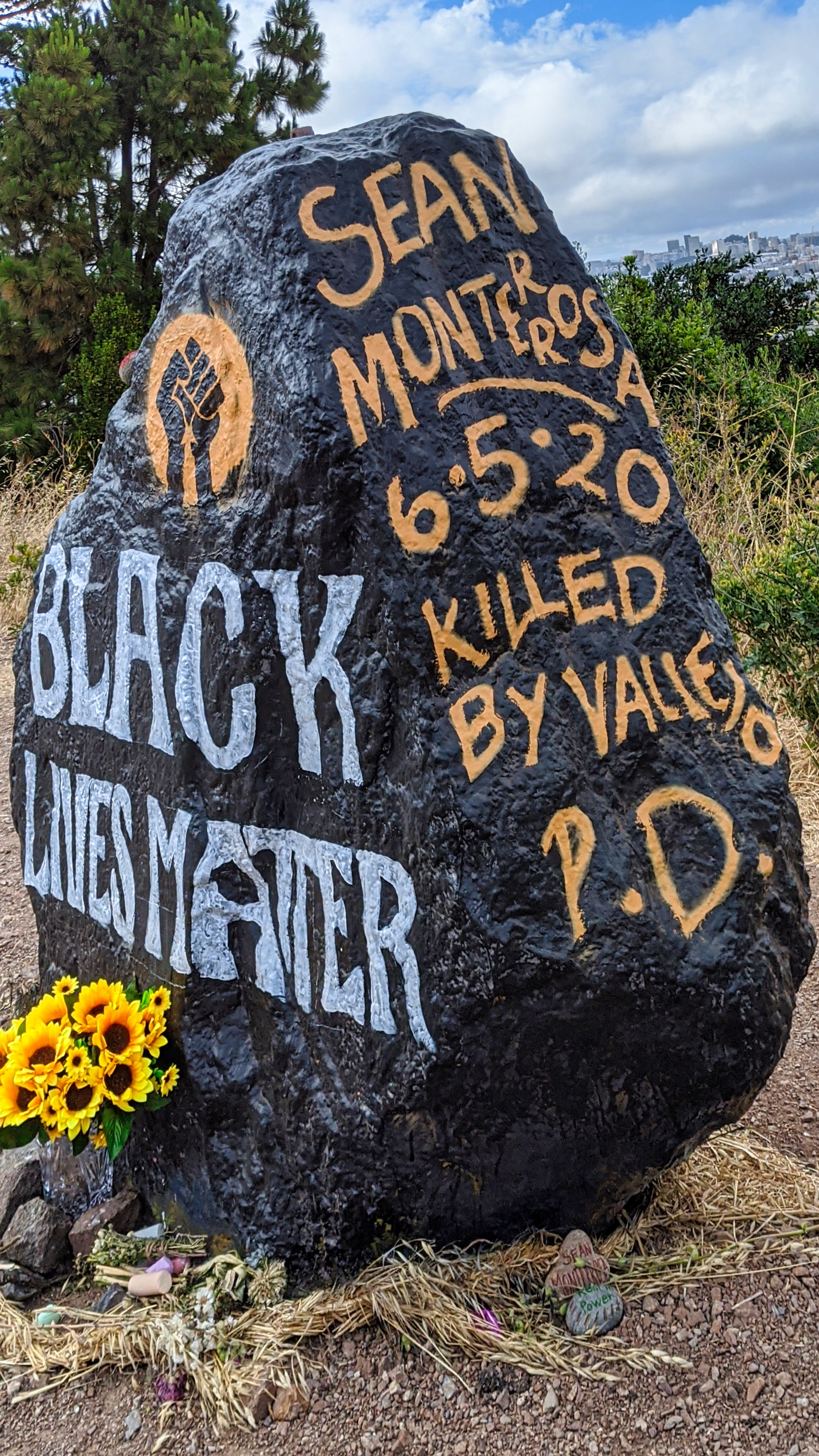
Bernal Heights, San Francisco

Sean Monterrosa (age 22) was of Argentinean and Salvadoran descent. He grew up in San Francisco and attended an arts high school. He had worked for a Boys & Girls Club and had recently been working as a carpenter. Less than an hour before Monterrosa was shot, he texted his sister a petition demanding justice for George Floyd, who was murdered by Minneapolis police a week earlier. Monterrosa was laid to rest on June 19, 2020.

Jarrett Tonn has been a police officer in the Vallejo Police Department since 2014, after working for the Galt Police Department from 2007 to 2014. Monterrosa's killing was the fourth time in five years that Jarrett Tonn had shot at a person while on duty, including two shootings within six weeks in 2017 and a shooting in 2015 where Tonn fired 18 times. None of the three prior shootings resulted in a death and Tonn was cleared of wrongdoing by internal investigations in each case. Fifteen days after the fatal shooting of Monterrosa, Tonn was named in an unrelated excessive force and civil rights lawsuit in federal court.

Over the prior decade, Vallejo police shot 32 people, 18 of whom were killed, in which time no officer was fired for their role in a shooting. As of May 2019, the department had the highest per capita rate of police shootings in Northern California. Vallejo police killed people at a per capita rate over four times as high as neighboring city Richmond, a city with a similar population and similar high crime rate.

== Incident ==
Monterrosa was killed at 12:30 a.m. on June 2, while the city of Vallejo was under curfew in response to looting. Police did not reveal his death until a June 3 news conference. Police chief Shawny Williams said police were responding to a report of a possible looting at a branch of Walgreens and when officers arrived they saw 10 to 12 people in the parking lot. Two vehicles, a black sedan and a silver pickup truck, fled the area, resulting in a car chase where the black car rammed an officer's car and injured an officer.

Three detectives who were not involved in the chase arrived at the scene, in an unmarked pickup truck. Two detectives were in the front seat, and one was in the rear. As the truck arrived at the scene, the detective in the backseat mounted and aimed his rifle; the body camera he was wearing did not record sound in the seconds preceding the encounter. Just as the truck came to a stop, the detective in the back seat, later determined to be Jarrett Tonn, fired a rifle five times, through the windshield of the vehicle. One bullet struck Monterrosa in the back of the head. Immediately upon exiting the truck Tonn was recorded saying "What did he point at us?" The driver responded "I don't know man." Tonn then shouted "Hey, he pointed a gun at us!" At no point in the immediate aftermath of the incident was the shooting officer separated from other involved officers.

Tonn claimed Monterrosa appeared to be running towards the black sedan involved in the chase but he suddenly stopped, took a kneeling position, and placed his hands above his waist. No firearms were found with Monterrosa. The involved detectives claim that they mistook the end of a 15-inch hammer sticking out of his sweatshirt pocket for a gun.

== Investigations ==
=== Investigations into the shooting ===
In June 2020, U.S. Representative Mike Thompson and Assemblyperson Tim Grayson called for an independent investigation into the shooting, with Grayson saying that "it is absolutely unacceptable that the public was forced to wait for over 24 hours to learn of the conditions of those involved in the shooting," regardless of the circumstances.

On July 2, 2020, Solano County District Attorney Krishna Abrams announced that she would recuse herself from investigations into the shooting, despite her office's key role in potential criminal charges against Tonn. California Attorney General Xavier Becerra and the California Department of Justice refused to investigate the shooting in place of the recused District Attorney. On July 17, Speaker of the House Nancy Pelosi called for an FBI investigation into the killing and the Vallejo Police Department.

In 2022 an independent third-party investigation found that Tonn had violated several department policies, including unreasonable deadly force, not de-escalating the situation, and not activating his body-camera. Following the investigation Tonn was fired from the Vallejo Police Department.

==== Release of body camera footage ====
The Monterrosa family called for the release of videos related to the shooting, including police body camera footage, video from the police cruiser, and surveillance video from Walgreens. On June 16, 2020, the San Francisco Board of Supervisors passed a resolution urging the city of Vallejo to release the body camera video of the incident.

External videos
- Raw police bodycam footage beginning approximately 12:36 a.m. on YouTube (7 min 22 s)

Body camera footage was eventually released several weeks after the shooting. The footage does not show Monterrosa before he was shot, but shows Tonn firing from inside his car before he had fully stopped his vehicle. Tonn asked the driver, "What did he point at us?" to which the driver responded, "I don't know, man." Tonn is heard shouting "This is not what I fucking needed today!"

==== Release of information ====
On June 2, 2020, at 4:08 am, police released a statement indicating that there had been an "officer-involved shooting" but declined to offer specifics on whether it was fatal and who was involved. Monterrosa had been declared dead two and a half hours before that press conference took place. At 3:00 pm on the afternoon of June 3, 2020 the Vallejo police chief announced that the previously disclosed shooting involved an officer fatally shooting someone. When asked to explain the delay in informing the public that an officer had killed someone, the chief stated that at the time of the initial statement Monterrosa had not been pronounced dead. In media reports on June 10, 2020 the public learned that the police chief's statement on June 3 was not accurate information.

In the later-released body camera footage of the incident, Tonn is heard saying first that Monterrossa pointed something at the police vehicle, then saying that Monterrossa pointed a gun at the police vehicle. In a press conference on June 5, 2020, the police chief said that the officers saw Monterrossa running toward a car at the scene, that he stopped, took a kneeling position, and placed his hands above his waist, revealing what appeared to be the butt of a handgun. On June 5, the Vallejo police union released a statement, saying that Monterrosa “abruptly pivoted back around toward the officers, and crouched into a tactical shooting position,” that the hammer “appeared to be the butt of a gun, and that the officer fired, “as a last resort.”

The name of the officer involved was not released by the police department. The Bay Area News Group identified the shooter as Jarrett Tonn on June 5. On June 15, the Vallejo police union filed a temporary restraining order to prevent the release of the name of any officer involved in the killing. On June 16, the city of Vallejo announced it would oppose the motion in court and would “seek to defend the [c]ity’s right to release the name of the officer(s) at a time and through a method of its choosing.”

=== Investigations into the destruction of evidence ===
On July 15, 2020, the Vallejo city manager's office announced that the windshield through which Tonn shot and killed Monterrosa had been destroyed without permission by a city employee, who had been placed on administrative leave and recommended for independent criminal investigation. On July 15, after confirming that essential evidence in the case had been destroyed by city staff, the city of Vallejo called for the California Department of Justice to begin an independent investigation. On July 17, Becerra announced that the California Department of Justice would investigate the destruction of essential evidence by the city of Vallejo. Becerra said that the investigation was limited to the destruction of evidence and that he would only relay any findings back to the Solano County District Attorney.

In July 2020, a city source confirmed that Michael Nichelini, Vallejo police officer and president of the Vallejo police officers' association, was on paid leave and under investigation for destroying the windshield and putting the unmarked truck back into service without the consent of the police chief or city attorney. Officer Fabio Rodriguez was also placed on paid leave in connection with the destruction of evidence. Nichelini was served with a notice of termination on December 21, 2020. On March 12, 2021, Nichelini filed a federal civil rights lawsuit against the city of Vallejo alleging that his termination, prior discipline, and investigations were acts of retaliation and harassment by city officials. On April 2, 2021, Nichelini was fired by the city of Vallejo while Rodriguez was suspended for 40 hours. In December 2022, an arbitrator overturned the termination of Nichelini and ordered him reinstated with $118,050.40 back pay.

=== Review of the Vallejo Police Department ===
On June 5, California Attorney General Xavier Becerra announced a general review of the Vallejo Police Department intended to "build public trust through good policies, practices, and training." The review is authorized by an agreement between the city of Vallejo and the California Department of Justice effective until June 5, 2023.

=== Reinstatement of Detective Tonn ===
On August 18, 2023, Detective Jarrett Tonn was cleared and reinstated with full back pay in a binding arbitration decision. The arbitrator found that Detective Tonn's use of deadly force was legally justified based on the proper application of California AB 392. The City of Vallejo's disciplinary charges were found to have misapplied the law, and it was determined that the City failed to prove its allegations in its notice to terminate Detective Tonn's employment. Further, it was determined the independent investigating entity contracted by then Chief Shawny Williams came to their conclusions in a flawed manner, contrary to well established law and United States Supreme Court precedent.

== Legal proceedings ==
Monterrosa v. City of Vallejo
- Court: United States District Court for the Eastern District of California
- Full case name: Neftali Monterrosa; Nora Monterrosa; Michelle Monterrosa; and Ashley Monterrosa v. City of Vallejo and Jarrett Tonn
- Submitted: August 6, 2020
- Citation: 2:20-cv-01563-TLN-DB

Court membership
- Judge sitting: Troy L. Nunley

=== Federal civil rights lawsuit ===
The Monterrosa family has been represented by civil rights and police brutality attorneys John Burris and Lee Merritt. Burris issued a statement condemning Tonn's overreaction as Monterrosa had done nothing to threaten the police and was not threatening anyone with a weapon, even if he had been armed with one. Burris said that "[t]here is a 22-year-old kid who is now dead who appeared to be surrendering and he is shot down in cold blood." Burris also announced his intention to file a civil suit against the city of Vallejo. Following the release of the body camera footage, Burris said the footage made clear that there had been "no de-escalation" and "no justification" for the use of lethal force, and noted that police officials had offered multiple conflicting accounts of the shooting.

On August 6, 2020, the Monterrosa family filed a federal civil rights lawsuit against the city of Vallejo and Jarrett Tonn. The lawsuit alleges that Monterrosa's civil rights were violated by unjustified use of deadly force when he was shot and killed by Tonn.

On February 10, 2021, United States District Judge Troy L. Nunley denied a change of venue motion filed by Tonn.

Subsequently, the Monterrosa family replaced Burris with national civil rights lawyer John Coyle of the McEldrew Purtell firm in Philadelphia. In November of 2025, United States District Judge Dale A. Drozd denied efforts by the city of Vallejo and Tonn to have the case dismissed on summary judgment, paving the way for a jury trial in September of 2026. In March of 2026, a settlement was announced in the amount of $8.5 Million, the largest in the history of the Vallejo PD.

=== Criminal prosecution ===
As of February 2021, no federal, state, or local criminal investigation or prosecution had taken place. Monterrosa's sisters called on Becerra and Governor Gavin Newsom to appoint a special prosecutor to investigate the shooting and the Vallejo Police Department, as well as to charge and prosecute Jarrett Tonn and other officers and city staff involved in the shooting and the destruction of evidence. On April 2, 2021, Monterrosa's sisters called on Attorney General-nominee Rob Bonta to meet with their family and to appoint a special prosecutor to investigate all officers involved in the shooting and the destruction of evidence. On August 28, 2023, Tonn had his job reinstated. In December 2023, Attorney General Bonta announced that the state would not prosecute Tonn.

== Memorials, protests, and reactions ==
Sean Monterrosa protests
- Part of 2020–2021 United States racial unrest and George Floyd protests
- Date: June 5, 2020 – present (6 years, 4 months and 1 week)
- Location: San Francisco Bay Area
- Caused by: Shooting of Sean Monterrosa; Lack of police accountability; Police brutality and misconduct; Inequality and racism
- Methods: Protests, demonstrations, billboards, murals, civil disobedience, online activism

In June 2020, protesters began gathering in Vallejo and across the Bay Area to ask for officers involved to be charged "to the fullest extent of the law" and to call for the release of body camera video. On June 5, a "Justice for Sean Monterrosa" protest was held at Mission and 24th Street in San Francisco.

In July and August 2020, a billboard calling for "Justice for Sean Monterrosa" and featuring a portrait of Monterrosa by Oree Originol from the Justice for Our Lives project was displayed above 624 Irving Street in San Francisco.

On September 22, 2020, a "Justice for Sean Monterrosa" billboard was put up a block away from the Vallejo Police Department. On September 27, after a march from Wilson Park to the billboard, a moment of silence was held and Monterrosa's sisters gave statements.

On October 2, 2020, the four-month anniversary of Monterrosa's death, a protest was staged on the driveway outside Governor Gavin Newsom's house. A group of 17 protestors, including Monterrosa's sisters and members of Justice League CA, demanded Newsom appoint a special prosecutor to investigate the case. The protestors were later arrested and detained overnight in Sacramento County Jail.

In San Francisco, a collection of books in Spanish and English on social justice, the Sean Monterrosa Knowledge Up Community Library, was established in two Little Free Libraries on Holly Park Circle, where Monterrosa was raised. In March 2024, the San Francisco Board of Supervisors voted to rename the intersection of Holly Park Circle and Park Street to "Sean Monterrosa Boulevard".
