= Justseeds =

Artist Cooperation Association

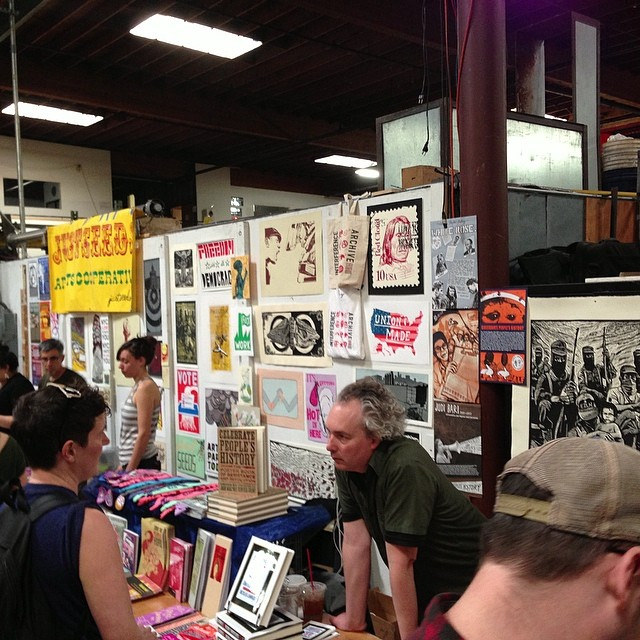
Justseeds members tabling at Anarchist Book Fair at the Crucible in Oakland.

Justseeds Artists' Cooperative is a worker-owned cooperative of 40 North American artists, founded in 1998. Justseeds members primarily produce handmade prints and publications, which are distributed through their website and at events related to social and environmental movements. Members also work individually as graphic designers for social and environmental activist causes in the U.S., Canada, and Mexico. As a collective body, Justseeds has produced several gallery exhibitions of both print work and collaborative sculptural installation.

== History ==
Justseeds was founded in 1998 by Josh MacPhee as an internet-based store and distribution platform for graphics produced by MacPhee and his associates. Following the 2006 collapse of Clamor magazine, which was handling Justseeds' mail-order distribution, MacPhee organized several artist colleagues into a cooperative entity that could expand to include other artists. Originally launched as Justseeds/Visual Resistance Collective in 2007, the name was later shortened to Justseeds Artists' Cooperative.

Justseeds ran a distribution center, consisting of an online store and internal archive, from the basement of a private home in Portland, Oregon, from 2007 until 2010. In May 2010, operations were moved to Pittsburgh, Pennsylvania.

== Organization ==
Justseeds is a worker-owned, cooperatively structured business entity. The organization's internal structure is focused on consensus decision making. Although it is registered in Pennsylvania, where the shipping office for the internet store is located, Justseeds members are spread across North America. Inter-cooperative communication takes place primarily online, and mission-oriented discussions and project generation occur at occasional large group gatherings.

Justseeds is a collective organization of graphic printmakers, but individual members also work independently as educators, writers, sculptors, designers, and in puppet theater, and have also published books, fanzines, and other graphic works which are informally included within the Justseeds rubric, including the journal Signal (Dunn, Macphee, PM Press) and the Celebrate People’s History Book (MacPhee, Feminist Press 2010). Firebrands: Portraits from the Americas (Microcosm Publishing, 2010) was their first collective publishing project.

As of September 2024, notable members of Justseeds include Favianna Rodriguez, Josh MacPhee, Meredith Stern, Melanie Cervantes, Jesus Barraza, Dylan Miner, Jess X. Snow, Aaron Hughes, Erik Ruin, and Jessica Sabogal.

== Collective projects ==
Justseeds has collectively produced several print portfolios and collaborative art installations which differ from the individual members’ projects in that they are considered productions of Justseeds as a collective entity. In the case of the print portfolios, Justseeds regularly works with other outside, affiliated artists.

- Voices From Outside: Artists Against the Prison Industrial Complex (with Critical Resistance, print portfolio, 2008)
- In the Shell of the Old (collaborative installation, Space 1026, Philadelphia, PA, 2008)
- Which Side Are You On? (collaborative installation, University of Wisconsin, Milwaukee, 2009)
- Resourced (print portfolio, 2009)
- Firebrands: Portraits from the Americas (book, Microcosm Publishing, 2010)
- untitled billboard landscape (collaborative installation, Miller Gallery at Carnegie Mellon University, 2011 Pittsburgh Biennial, Pittsburgh, PA)
- Refuge (collaborative installation, 29th Biennial of Graphic Arts, Alkatraz Gallery: Metelkova, Ljubljana, Slovenia, 2011)
- War is Trauma (with Iraq Veterans Against the War, print portfolio, 2011)
- Migration Now (collaboration with CultureStrike, print portfolio, 2013)
- Uprisings: Images of Labor (collaborative installation, University of Wisconsin, Milwaukee, 2013)
- Liberating Learning (print portfolio, 2014)
- We Are The Storm (collaboration with CultureStrike, print portfolio, 2015)
- We're All in this Together (collaborative installation with Interference Archive, SUNY Purchase, Fall 2017)
