= Erik Ruin =

American visual artist (born 1978)

- Born: Erik Reuland; April 15, 1978 (age 47); Detroit, Michigan, U.S.
- Known for: Papercutting, silk screening, shadow puppetry, theatre
- Notable work: Flight, The Nothing Factory, Paths Toward Utopia

Erik Ruin (born Erik Reuland, April 15, 1978) is a visual and theatrical artist living in Philadelphia, Pennsylvania. Known for his use of papercuttings, printmaking, and shadow puppetry to convey political themes, Ruin's style has appeared in several books, art exhibitions, and as a founding member of the Justseeds Artists' Cooperative.

== Early life and education ==
Born in Michigan, Reuland grew up in the Detroit metropolitan area. His first immersion into counterculture was during his teens in the U.S. punk rock scene where he picked up the nickname Erik Ruin. He became interested in art while living in Baltimore, Maryland and began making shadow puppet shows after moving to New Orleans.

Ruin's first work as a printmaker was as a stencil artist using spray paint, and then block printing after an internship with the Bread & Puppet Theater. Bread & Puppet also induced the elements of cantastoria and other forms of 2-D and banner theatre into his work. For several years he compiled his writings and prints in his annual publication Trouble In Mind. Ruin returned to the Midwest in the early 2000s, before relocating to Philadelphia in 2007.

== Career ==
Erik Ruin's first works of shadow theatre made use of flat rod puppets behind a scrim, often self-contained in boxes for easy transport. His 2005 solo show How Can You Own? was a moving panorama built as a bicycle trailer that he toured around northern Europe. 2006's Seams Like was a triple-screened shadow box based on the works by Bertolt Brecht, which he toured around the East Coast via public transportation. He also staged larger works with Barebones in Minneapolis, at the Fitzgerald Theater in St. Paul, and with composer/playwright Reid Books in Philadelphia. Ruin and Books founded the record label Desperate Commodities to release their collaborations on vinyl and CD, including 2007's The Nothing Factory and 2011's Capital I and the Royal Waltzing We.

In 2009 Erik Ruin shifted to working with overhead projection (OHP) to allow for increased scale of his performances. His first major work with OHP was Flight: The Mythic Journey of a Person Displaced. Inspired by Valentino Achak Deng and Dave Eggers' book What Is the What, Ruin's silhouettes moved through land and seascapes of layered multi-colored acetate images to tell the story of African refugees with a live violin-and-vocal soundtrack by Katt Hernandez. The show premiered at Philadelphia's Institute of Contemporary Art and toured the U.S. before being released as a CD and book. Ruin also began to use his overhead projectors as an improviser, making use of detritus from his papercutting studio as an improvising performer. He became a non-musical member of the band Lesser known Neutrinos and had regular sessions with electronic music artist Charles Cohen before founding his own Ominous Cloud Ensemble with a roster of Philadelphia improvisers, including some from the Sun Ra Arkestra and Fern Knight, accompanied by occasional poets and dancers.

In 2015 Erik Ruin created and toured Prisoner Song, a collaboration with vocalist Gelsey Bell and a number of prison activists, including former political prisoner Laura Whitehorn and Philadelphia's Hakim Ali. In 2017 Ruin installed Ali's narrative from the show in a year-long exhibition about incarceration at Eastern State Penitentiary. In that same year Ruin completed the first 100 feet of Long/Gone, a panorama performance cut from a very long scroll of 5-inch-wide paper and then projected onto a wall and scored by the Ominous Cloud Ensemble as an hour-long work. In 2019 he collaborated with New Zealand-born musician/composer Rosie Langabeer and others on an installation performance called "Soon, Now, Gone" for which Ruin constructed a number of zoopraxiscopes.

== Theatrical productions ==
- Long/Gone (2017)
- Antigone (2016)
- Prisoner's Song (2015)
- Boundless: A Collaborative Work of Epic Theater (2014)
- One Touch of Nature Makes the Whole World Kin (2013)
- Capital I & the Royal Waltzing We (2011)
- Flight: The Mythic Journey of a Person Displaced (2009)
- The Nothing Factory: A Musical Shadow Theater Extravaganza (2007)
- Seams Like (2006)
- How Can You Own? (2005)
- The Other 9/11: Another Hemisphere Remembers (2003)

== Exhibitions ==
- "Soon, Now, Gone" at Philadelphia Rail Park (2019)
- "Hakim's Tale" at Eastern State Penitentiary (2017)

== Publications ==
- Threnody of the Dispossessed (Swarthmore, 2019)
- Paths Toward Utopia: Graphic Explorations of Everyday Anarchism (with Cindy Milstein, PM Press, 2012)
- Flight (book with CD by Katt Hernandez, Desperate Commodities, 2010)
- The Nothing Factory (book with CD by the Aetherial Underpants Orchestra, Desperate Commodities, 2008)
- Realizing the Impossible: Art Against Authority (with Josh MacPhee, AK Press, 2007)
- All The Days After: Critical Voices in Poetry & Artwork (co-edited as a member of the Upsidedown Culture Collective, 2002)
- Trouble In Mind (issues 1–6. 2000–2006)
