= Sabogal =

Sabogal is a surname. The origin of the surname Sabogal is Hungarian. Sabogal is the union of two popular Hungarian surnames, Szabó which means tailor, and Gál which means Gaul. This surname has migrated to Italy and, from there, to America. Notable people with the surname include:

- Fernando Sabogal Viana (1941−2013), Colombian Roman Catholic bishop
- Isabel Sabogal (born 1958), Polish-Peruvian author
- Jessica Sabogal (born 1987), Colombian-American Painter and Muralist
- José Sabogal (1888–1956), Peruvian painter
- Monsignor Moisés Sabogal Romero, Bishop of Catacaos, Piura, Peru.
