= Presente =

Presente may refer to:

- The present
- presente, the present tense of Spanish verbs
- ¡Presente!, the newsletter of the School of the Americas Watch
- Presente.org, an American advocacy group that "exists to amplify the political voice of Latino communities" in the United States
- Presente (Renato Russo album), 2003
- Presente (Bajofondo album), 2013
