= List of killings by law enforcement officers in the United States, February 2019 =

This is a list of people reported killed by non-military law enforcement officers in the United States in February 2019, whether in the line of duty or not, and regardless of reason or method. The listing documents the occurrence of a death, making no implications regarding wrongdoing or justification on the part of the person killed or officer involved. Killings are arranged by date of the incident that caused death. Different death dates, if known, are noted in the description. The table below lists 82 people.

== February 2019 ==
Date	Name (age) of deceased	Race	State (city)	Description
2019-02-28	Michael E. Pierce (29)	White	Washington (Vancouver)	A man in his car was reportedly threatening to shoot others and himself with what appeared to be a handgun. After disobeying police orders he was shot and killed. Two fake plastic guns were later found in the vehicle.
2019-02-28	Kenneth Joseph Sisneros (34)	Hispanic	Colorado (Lone Tree)	Police officers responding to an armed shoplifting at a store responded to the scene and found two suspects. One of the suspects, a man, pulled out a handgun and was shot and killed by police. The second suspect, a woman, fled the scene and managed to escape. The deceased man was later identified as 34-year-old Kenneth Joseph Sisneros.
2019-02-27	Gary Clark (21)	Unknown race	Louisiana (DeRidder)	Officers were attempting to serve a felony arrest on Clark, when he allegedly pulled out a weapon, to which the officers responded to by shooting and killing him.
2019-02-27	James Scott Reed (40)	Black	Texas (Killeen)	Officers were attempting to conduct a no-knock (surprise) warrant search of Reed's apartment, who was suspected of drug trafficking. Entering the apartment the officers were met with gunfire, and in response they fired back. Shortly after they encountered Reed's body, and he was pronounced dead at the scene.
2019-02-26	Sasha Ann Pishko (20)	White	Georgia (McIntosh County)	Pishko was shot and killed by police.
2019-02-26	Tyler Schmidtbauer (27)	White	Minnesota (Miltona)	Schmidtbauer was shot and killed by police.
2019-02-26	Brandon Schmitt (48)	White	Ohio (Struthers)	Police were called to Schmitt's residence after he had reportedly assaulted his girlfriend's 16-year-old daughter with a flashlight. The girl and her 12-year-old brother were able to escape the house along with their mother, where the former was transported to hospital with a broken arm and a concussion. After a 14 hour standoff where police used both pepper spray and a stun gun to try to unsuccessfully force Schmitt to surrender, he was shot and killed by a shot using a thermal imaging. Police justified killing Schmitt saying that he was armed and dangerous and there was no hope of peacefully ending the standoff.
2019-02-26	Joseph Hart (51)	White	South Carolina (Huger)	A shootout involving multiple officers began when after pulling over a vehicle in a remote area the driver opened fire. The officer called for back up. In a shootout that lasted 30 minutes the suspect shot at the responding officers and SWAT team with a shotgun, rifle, and handgun. The suspect took cover behind a nearby shed and continued to fire at the police, but at one point briefly exposed himself and was shot and killed. None of the responding law enforcement reported injuries. The deceased suspect was later identified as 51-year-old Joseph Hart.
2019-02-25	David Litton (40)	White	Colorado (Denver)	Litton was shot and killed by police.
2019-02-25	Bryan A. Ryder (38)	White	Missouri (Springfield)	Ryder was shot and killed by police.
2019-02-24	Tommy Kirby (41)	White	Michigan (Flint)	Kirby was shot and killed by three police officers after a vehicle pursuit. An investigation is ongoing.
2019-02-23	Angel Burke (29)	White	Tennessee (Clarksville)	Officers with the Clarksville Police Department responded to a vehicle crash, where they observed a man and woman walking away from the scene. When approached the man, who police later identified as Burke, fled the scene with officers giving pursuit. After realizing that Burke was carrying a handgun one of the officers shot and killed him.
2019-02-23	Sterling Durant Humbert (28)	White	Texas (Carrollton)	After a routine traffic stop turned into a hot pursuit, officers stopped the vehicle and noticed the driver was armed. The driver, Sterling Durant Humbert, did not obey police orders to drop the weapon, in response to which one of the officers shot and killed him. The family later disputed police accounts, saying that Humbert suffered from mental health problems and that officers did not adequately try to de-escalate the situation.
2019-02-23	Daniel David Messmer (24)	White	California (Victorville)	Messmer was shot and killed by police.
2019-02-23	Isaias Rodriguez (33)	Hispanic	Greeley, CO	
2019-02-23	Jackie Scott Pendergrass (44)	White	Tennessee (Blountville)	Pendergrass was shot and killed by police.
2019-02-22	Felipe Martinez (36)	Hispanic	Texas (Poteet)	Martinez was shot and killed by police.
2019-02-22	Timmothy Rhodes (28)	White	West Virginia (Walton)	Police stopped a vehicle during a traffic stop. The female occupant in the passenger seat got out without incident. The male occupant in the driver seat however did not get out and had to be persuaded by police officers. When attempting to handcuff him however a struggle ensued where the suspect allegedly reached for the officer's firearm, which in response he was shot and killed. The individual was later identified as 28-year-old Timmothy Rhodes. Protest erupted in Rhodes's home town calling the shooting unjustified.
2019-02-22	Kasim Kahrim (36)	Asian	Massachusetts (Boston)	Two police officers pulled over an SUV, and on approaching the vehicle the occupant inside opened fire on the officers. One of the officers was hit twice in his right hand and once in the left bicep, the other was unharmed. The officers returned fire with their weapons and the suspect was hit multiple times. He was later pronounced dead and identified as Kasim Kahrim.
2019-02-22	Bradley Blackshire (30)	Black	Arkansas (Little Rock)	Police pulled over a vehicle that was reported as being stolen. As the officer got out of his vehicle the car pulled around and accelerated towards the officer. The officer opened fire in the seconds before he was hit by the vehicle, killing the driver. The officer was later hospitalised and the driver identified as Bradley Blackshire. A female passenger who was in the car at the time was uninjured.
2019-02-20	Kyron Marcell Sands (39)	Black	Connecticut (Norwich)	After police interrupted a burglary in process, the suspect shot at police before carjacking a vehicle and fleeing the scene. Police gave chase which ended with the vehicle crashing and the individual, who once again opened fire on law enforcement. The officers shot back, and the suspect was shot in the stomach and eventually died. He was later identified as 39-year-old Kyron Marcell Sands of Hartford.
2019-02-20	Kyle Thomas (26)	White	Hawaii (Honolulu)	Thomas was shot and killed by police.
2019-02-19	Clayton Joseph (16)	Native Hawaiian or Pacific Islander	Washington (Vancouver)	Police responded to a report of two teenagers fighting in a parking lot. Responding to the scene the officer saw that one of the individuals, later identified as Clayton Joseph, was armed with a knife. According to the report Joseph did not obey commands to drop the knife and continued to wave it around, resulting in the officer shooting and killing Joseph.
2019-02-19	Athens Christopher Trey Mahrt (28)	White	Horn Lake, MS	
2019-02-19	Emanuel David Joshua Oates (24)	Black	Maryland (Baltimore)	Oates was shot and killed by police.
2019-02-18	Delmar Espejo (28)	Asian	Hawaii (Honolulu)	Espejo was shot and killed by police officers.
2019-02-18	Pierre Woods (31)	Black	Mississippi (Pelahatchie)	Police responded a house owned by Woods, who shot at police and refused to come out of the house. After trying to negotiate unsuccessfully, police then forced tear gas in the house. After the tear gas entered the house Woods emerged, according to police armed and acting in a threatening manner, prompting the officers to shoot Woods multiple times.
2019-02-17	Reginald Romero Bursey (32)	Black	Louisiana (New Orleans)	Bursey had a warrant for his arrest for assault with a deadly weapon and tying up and robbing two people. He was also wanted for a parole violation in his home state of Texas. Bursey was approached by officers as he was a suspect in a recent armed robbery and that they realized there was a warrant for his arrest. Bursey opened fire on the officers, who responded by shooting him multiple times, killing him. Three bystanders were also shot during the exchange, although all of them survived.
2019-02-17	Javier Hernandez Morales (43)	Hispanic	California (Napa Valley)	Morales was shot and killed by police officers.
2019-02-17	Elizabeth Ann Stropp (37)	Unknown race	Tennessee (Claiborne County)	Stropp was shot and killed by police.
2019-02-17	Johnathan Liddell (45)	Unknown race	Georgia (Douglas County)	An off-duty ICE officer, Othello Jones, shot and killed Liddell in the parking lot of a Walmart after Jones says Liddell reach for something in his car. An Airsoft gun was found in Liddell's passenger seat.
2019-02-16	Michael Elam (20)	Black	Illinois (Chicago)	Elam was shot and killed by police.
2019-02-16	Nam Quang Le (34)	Asian	Mississippi (Clinton)	Le was shot and killed by police.
2019-02-15	Gary Martin (45)	Black	Illinois (Aurora)	Martin was the perpetrator of a mass shooting, shot and killed by police officers responding. See Aurora, Illinois shooting.
2019-02-14	Michael Wade Drayer (34)	White	Pennsylvania (Aspers)	Drayer was shot and killed by police.
2019-02-14	Wilfredo Hernandez (47)	Hispanic	California (Los Angeles)	Hernandez was shot and killed by police.
2019-02-14	Mario Clark (31)	Black	Jackson, MS	
2019-02-14	Daniel E. King (37)	Black	Texas (Corpus Christi)	
2019-02-14	Bryce Bellomo (34)	White	Hubbard, MN	
2019-02-14	Mark Morasky (33)	White	California (San Jose)	Morasky was shot and killed by police officers.
2019-02-13	Greg Alyn Carlson (46)	White	North Carolina (Apex)	Carlson, who was on the nation's most wanted list, was killed by a single shot fired by an FBI agent. Carlson was wanted for multiple armed rapes in the Los Angeles area and had been on the run.
2019-02-13	Nearreada Robles (17)	Black	Camden, NJ	
2019-02-13	Garrett James Ebenal (28)	White	Alaska (Fairbanks)	Ebenal was shot and killed by police.
2019-02-12	Christopher Brimsey (20)	Black	Texas (Cinco Ranch)	Brimsey was shot and killed by police.
2019-02-12	Patrick Reed (19)	Black	Texas (Cinco Ranch)	Reed was shot and killed by police.
2019-02-12	Alex Johnson (58)	Black	Ohio (Defiance)	Johnson was shot and killed by police.
2019-02-12	Johnny Mathis (46)	White	California (Merced)	Mathis was killed at a standoff at his house with police. Mathis himself was a cop in the Dos Palos police department and had been in law enforcement since the 1990s, although he had been placed on leave for unspecified reasons.
2019-02-12	Brian Simonsen (42)	White	New York (Queens)	Simonsen, a 19-year veteran with the New York police force, was killed in a friendly fire incident while responding to a robbery scene in Queens.
2019-02-11	Daniel Espinoza (23)	Hispanic	Fullerton, CA	
2019-02-11	Phayvanh Inthavong (32)	Asian	California (Redding)	Inthavong was shot and killed by police.
2019-02-11	Ty'rell Pounds (24)	Black	Kentucky (Pee Wee Valley)	Pounds was shot and killed by police.
2019-02-11	Eric Young (34)	White	West Virginia (Montgomery)	Young was shot and killed by police.
2019-02-10	Willie Jermaine Robinson (34)	Black	South Carolina (Greenville)	Police officers responded to a 911 call made by Robinson in which he claimed to have been poisoned by a woman with him at his trailer. Arriving at the scene officers heard a gunshot to which they took cover. Robinson exited the trailer holding a firearm, disobeying orders to drop the weapon, and allegedly tried to goad the officers into shooting him. Robinson fired his gun two times in the air as officers tried to calm him down verbally. When Robinson pointed his weapon at one of the officers he was shot and killed. The woman in Robinson's trailer was transported to hospital with a non-life threatening injury gunshot wound.
2019-02-10	Ted Schmitz (54)	White	Wisconsin (Waukesha)	Schmitz was shot and killed by police officers.
2019-02-09	Gabriel Lane Carter (25)	White	Oklahoma (Del City)	Carter was shot and killed by police.
2019-02-09	Willie McCoy (21)	Black	California Vallejo	McCoy was found unresponsive in his car at a TacoBell drive through not responding to other drivers knocking at his window or honking their horns. Six police officers responded and observed McCoy in the driver seat with what appeared to be a gun in his lap. The officers attempted contact McCoy and also tried to break open the window. McCoy awoke and allegedly reached for his gun, prompting the officers to open fire, striking McCoy multiple times and killing him. The incident was controversial due to the fact that it was unclear if McCoy was aware of his surroundings and if he was actually reaching for his gun. McCoy's family stated that they will sue the Vallejo police department.
2019-02-09	Jonathan Ramirez (29)	Hispanic	North Carolina (Bailey)	Ramirez was shot and killed by police.
2019-02-09	Jeffrey D. Tyree (57)	White	Virginia (Virginia Beach)	Tyree was shot and killed by police.
2019-02-08	Aaron Allen Przekop (25)	White	California (Kern County)	Przekop was shot and killed by police.
2019-02-08	Joshua Williams (32)	Black	New York (Manhattan)	New York City police officers responding to a domestic violence call in Manhattan's east side and initially apprehended Williams without incident until he suddenly broke loose, grabbed a knife and started stabbing his partner. Police responded by shooting Williams 5 times, killing him.
2019-02-07	Charles L. Cook (49)	White	Ohio (Barberton)	Cook was shot and killed by police.
2019-02-07	Nolan Hurtzig (29)	White	California (Banning)	Hurtzig was shot and killed by police.
2019-02-07	Jason Matthew Hill (40)	White	Tennessee (Memphis)	Hill was shot and killed by police.
2019-02-07	Michael Robert Novak (59)	White	California (Madera)	Novak was shot and killed by police officers.
2019-02-07	Danny Rodriguez (34)	Hispanic	Washington (Seattle)	Rodriguez was shot and killed by police.
2019-02-07	Morgan Shane West (38)	White	Texas (Snyder)	West was shot and killed by police.
2019-02-06	Hunter Alan (48)	Unknown race	Texas (Edinburg)	Alan was shot and killed by police.
2019-02-06	Bruce Carter (38)	Black	Illinois (Joliet)	On February 6th, Carter was identified as a suspect in a bank robbery which occurred earlier that morning, and tracked to his mother's house. According to police reports, shortly after coming out to speak with police, Carter lunged at a detective with a box cutter and was fatally shot. The Will County State's Attorney ruled that the shooting was justified.
2019-02-06	Miles Dylan Cooper (25)	White	Mississippi (Stone County)	Cooper was shot and killed by police.
2019-02-06	Allon Jones (43)	Black	Tennessee (Walter Hill)	Jones was shot and killed by police.
2019-02-06	Seth Keo Mallard (20)	White	Colorado (LaSalle)	Mallard was shot and killed by police.
2019-02-06	Eleanor Northington (43)	Black	Indiana (Indianapolis)	
2019-02-05	Anthony Dewayne Childs (31)	Black	Louisiana (Shreveport)	Childs was shot and killed by police.
2019-02-04	Casey Joe Wright-Wells (40)	White	Arizona (Phoenix)	
2019-02-04	Corey Johnson (44)	Black	Virginia (Farmville)	Johnson was shot and killed by police.
2019-02-04	Robert Matz (80)	White	West Virginia (Clarksburg)	Matz was shot and killed by police.
2019-02-03	Asuncion J. Gomez-Guerrero (35)	Hispanic	Illinois (Waukegan)	Gomez-Guerrero was shot and killed by police.
2019-02-02	Dylan Joseph-Mark Cross (18)	White	Florida (Orange Park)	Cross was shot and killed by police.
2019-02-02	Henry Harold Russell (47)	White	Arizona (Flagstaff)	Russell was shot and killed by police.
2019-02-02	Isaiah Thomas (40)	Black	California (Stockton)	Thomas was shot and killed by police.
2019-02-02	Johnny Weeks (68)	Black	Georgia (Buford)	Weeks was shot and killed by police.
2019-02-01	Robert Martinez (45)	Hispanic	Colorado (Denver)	Martinez was shot and killed by police.

== See also ==
- Death in custody § United States
- Henry A. Wallace Police Crime Public Database
- List of cases of police brutality
- List of countries with annual rates and counts for killings by law enforcement officers
- List of law enforcement officers killed in the line of duty in the United States
- List of law enforcement officers convicted for an on-duty killing in the United States
- List of shootings by US immigration agents
- List of police reforms related to the George Floyd protests
- List of unarmed African Americans killed by law enforcement officers in the United States
- Lists of killings by law enforcement officers
- Police brutality in the United States
- Police misconduct § United States
- Police riot § United States
- Police use of deadly force in the United States
