= Gelsey =

Gelsey is a given name and a surname.

Notable people with the given name include:

- Gelsey Bell, American singer, songwriter, and actress
- Gelsey Kirkland (born 1952), American ballerina

Notable people with the surname include:

- Erwin S. Gelsey (died 1988), American screenwriter
