= Dara Greenwald =

Dara Greenwald

Dara Greenwald (1971–2012) was an interdisciplinary artist with a PhD in Electronic Arts from Rensselaer Polytechnic Institute, an MFA in writing from the School of the Art Institute in Chicago, and a BA in Women's Studies from Oberlin College. Her collaborative work involved video, writing, public art, activism and cultural organizing.

== Artwork ==
As an artist, Dara Greenwald's mission was "to make resistance visible, and present." She was well known for her activist-oriented video and performance art as well as her many collaborations and organizing practice. Her 2005 video work United Victorian Workers was screened at a number of venues including Creative Time's major exhibition at the Park Avenue Armory in New York City, Democracy in America, curated by Nato Thompson, as well as the Aurora Picture Show, San Francisco Art Institute, and the Brecht Forum. In 2008, Greenwald completed Spectres of Liberty: Ghost of Liberty Street Church, a project in collaboration with artists Josh MacPhee and Olivia Robinson. In a feature in Sculpture Magazine, author Jesse Ball describes the work's intention as an attempt to "make the invisible visible, from daily routines to entire cultural moments" and "to re-create the façade of a missing building and thereby trigger its psycho-physical space in the landscape as well as its historical context." The work consisted of an inflatable model of Liberty Street Presbyterian Church blown up in a parking lot and became a temporary community event space in Troy, NY. The church had originally burned down in 1941 and its memory was revitalized through video projected within the giant inflatable sculpture in collaboration with The Rensselaer County Historical Society. After this project took place, Greenwald, McPhee and Robinson continued working on similar projects under the collective name Spectres of Liberty and received a grant from Franklin Furnace Archive and the Harpo Foundation to continue making work through this collaboration.

A scholar as well as an artist, during her talk at the 2009 Creative Time Summit she talked about the origins of her work stating: "I was blessed to come to art and cultural production through punk and feminism" and that her long term goal was to "make resistance visible."

== Pink Bloque ==
In Chicago, she co-founded Pink Bloque, a “radical feminist dance troupe dedicated to challenging the white supremacist capitalist patriarchal empire one street dance party at a time.” The group was primarily active from 2001 until 2005 following the election of George W. Bush. Bloque members participated in local and national protest events including the 2014 March for Women's Lives in Washington D.C. and often hosted free workshops to introduce their particular dance-based protest philosophy to wider audiences. In 2007, NPR credited Pink Bloque, whose members dressed in hot pink and practiced a protest strategy that members describe as "tactical flirting," with re-inventing the "art of the protest." By 2005, Chicago-based dance troupe grew to include activists dispersed across the United States. Some scholars have characterized their feminist "camp" protest strategies as an outgrowth of queer social movements like Act Up. By using, rather than subverting, sexist stereotypes, Pink Bloque members focused on engagement and conversation over confrontation strategies deployed by other protest groups. Core to the mission of "The Bloque" was a discourse rooted in plurality and collectivism. In conversation with the press, Bloque members would use two aliases—Ellen Jones and Julie Smith—in order to present a unified front and privilege a collective, rather than individual, voice.

== Justseeds ==
Greenwald was a member of the Justseeds artist collective. With Josh MacPhee, she co-curated Signs of Change, which is "a visual introduction to the past 50 years of social movements from around the globe." Justseeds calls the book a "groundbreaking work" that "illustrates the extraordinary aesthetic range of radical movements during the past fifty years."

== Interference Archive ==
In 2011, Dara Greenwald co-founded Interference Archive in Brooklyn along with Josh MacPhee, Molly Fair, and Kevin Caplicki. Much of the material she had collected and created in her art and activism work became part of the collection of Interference Archive, and her background in punk feminism provided inspiration and archival material for Interference Archive's opening exhibition in December 2011.

== Death ==
Greenwald died on January 9, 2012, at her home in Brooklyn at age 40 from cancer.
