= Melanie Cervantes =

Artist

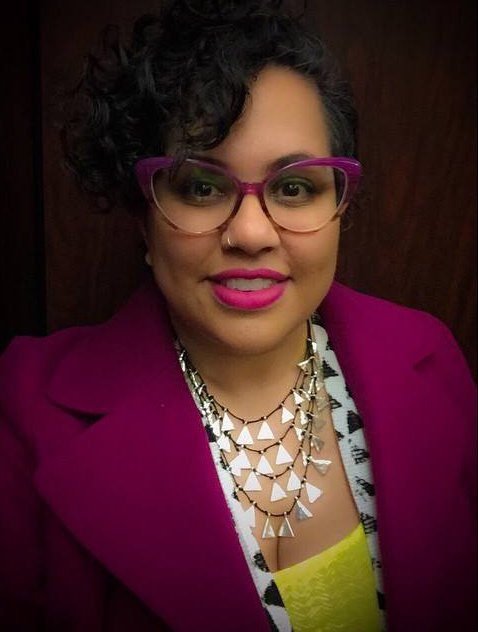
- Born: Harbor City, CA

Melanie Cervantes (born in Harbor City, CA) is a Xicana artist and activist based in the Bay Area.

== Early life ==
Cervantes grew up in a small city in the South Bay area of Los Angeles, California. Her father was a paper box printer and her family's poverty helped foster her interest in art, out of the necessity of creating their own clothing and Halloween costumes. She picked up color theory while helping her mother pick out clothes at the swap market and observed her father construct and repurpose junk in their garage.

== Education and activism ==
Cervantes now lives in San Francisco, California. In 2004 she graduated UC Berkeley with a bachelor's degree and formal training in ethnic studies.

Cervantes had a desire to change the way society views oppressed communities. She has hope for radical and social transformation. Her intentions are to exhibit resistance against oppressed groups to spark awareness and curiosity. Identifying as a member of the Chicanx community she is very aware and in touch with the struggles that not only occur in the Bay Area but around the world as well. In 2007, she co-founded Dignidad Rebelde, a graphic arts collaboration based in the Mission in San Francisco that highlights peoples stories of struggle, vision, hopes and dreams. Like Cervantes's work, they highlight the history of colonialism, genocide and exploitation and the effects of it in today's world. The collaboration is a series of prints and multimedia projects that center around Third World (developing countries) and indigenous movements and the erasure and loss of culture of these people. The posters and prints give power to the people- to transform, change, build, and project. Dignidad Rebelde's purpose is to illustrate stories of struggle, resistance and triumph into artwork that can be put back into the hands of the communities who inspire it. The pieces made are to evoke acceptance.

== Career ==
Cervantes works full-time as a Senior Program Officer at the Akonadi Foundation which supports movement-building organizations working to end structural racism in the United States. While at Akonadi she co-founded the Bay Area Justice Funders Network, an alliance of funders working strengthen grantmaking for social justice movements in the Bay Area and beyond.

As an artist, Cervantes has exhibited at Galería de la Raza (San Francisco); Woman Made Gallery and National Museum of Mexican Art (Chicago); Mexic-Arte and Guadalupe Cultural Arts Center (Austin, TX); Crewest (Los Angeles); and at the Musée d'Aquitaine (Bordeaux, France). Her work is in public collections of the Center for the Study of Political Graphics, the Latin American Collection of the Green Library at Stanford, and the Hispanic Research Center at the Arizona State University as well as various private collections throughout the U.S. She formed Dignidad Rebelde with printmaker Jesus Barraza, a collaborative graphic arts project that uses principles of Xicanisma and Zapatismo to translate stories of struggle and resistance into artwork that can be put back into the hands of the communities who inspire it. Their art highlights issues around immigration, prison reform, Third World liberation movements, and economic injustice.

Her work can also be found in Dylan Miner's book, Creating Azatlán. Cervantes' work has been included in the recent scholarship in Chicana/o studies of revolutionary women of color in Claudia D. Hernández book Women, Mujeres, Ixoq: Revolutionary Visions.

Cervantes is a member of Justseeds Collective, Taller Tupac Amaru, and the Consejo Gráfico.

== See also ==
- Chicano
- Galería de la Raza
- Art in the San Francisco Bay Area
