= Shanna Strauss =

Tanzanian-American-Canadian artist

- Education: California College of the Arts; McGill University School of Social Work
- Known for: Visual art

Shanna Strauss is a mixed media visual artist based in Montreal, Quebec, Canada. Strauss is Tanzanian-American-Canadian and has exhibited work in Tanzania, Canada, Senegal, and the United States. Working predominantly on found wood, she combines photo-transfer, painting, wood burning, wood carving, beads, fabric, and other traditional Tanzanian materials. The techniques and mediums in her work are selected for their symbolic and cultural significance. Strauss often collaborates with her life and artistic partner, visual artist Jessica Sabogal.

== Education ==
Strauss completed a Bachelor of Fine Arts at the California College of Arts, San Francisco, CA. In 2014, she completed a Master's degree in Social Work at McGill University, Montreal, Quebec, with a focus on International and Community Development.

== Career ==
=== Exhibitions ===
Strauss’ work has been exhibited at the Montreal Museum of Fine Arts, Montreal, Quebec,; SomArts, San Francisco, CA; SPARC Gallery, Los Angeles, CA; Kala Art Institute, Berkeley, CA; the Thacher Gallery at the University of San Francisco, San Francisco, CA; and the Esker Foundation, Calgary, Alberta, Canada.

Her work is in the permanent collection of the Montreal Museum of Fine Arts, Montreal, Quebec.

Strauss collaborated with artist Jessica Sabogal on the mural "Protect Our Trans Daughters" in Sacramento, California, honoring Chyna Gibson who was murdered in New Orleans. The grand opening was held on March 31, 2018, coinciding with Transgender Day of Visibility.

=== Awards ===
Strauss was awarded a Kala Fellowship and Media Residency for 2020-2021 from the Kala Art Institute, Berkeley, California.

In 2021, Strauss was a resident artist at Crosstown Arts, Memphis, Tennessee.

=== Publications ===
Her work has been featured in Canadian Art, CBC Arts, Montreal Gazette, Sacramento News & Review, and M – Montreal Museum of Fine Arts Magazine.
