= Meredith Stern =

American drummer

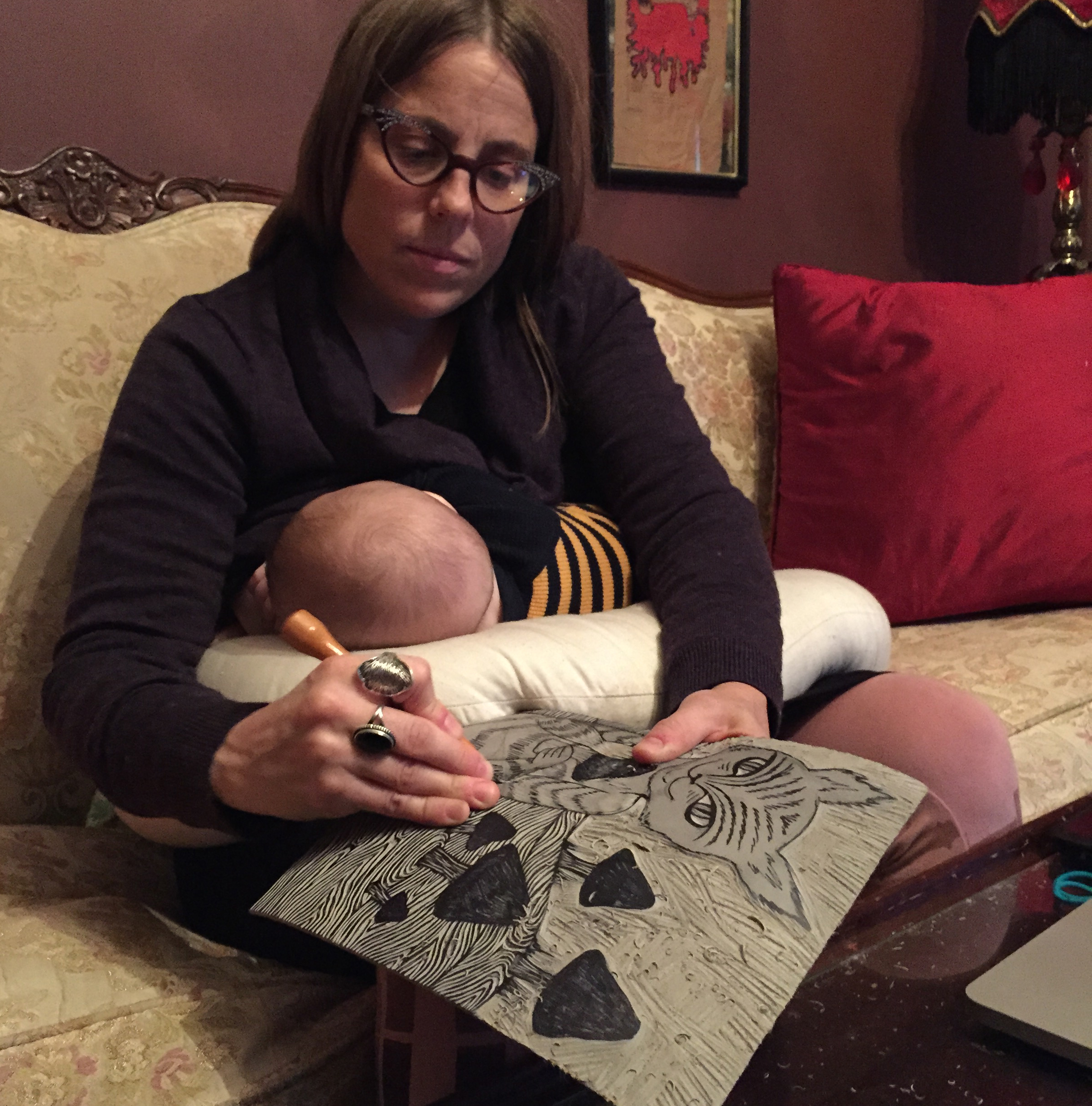
- Born: August 31, 1976 (age 50); Quakertown, Pennsylvania
- Occupations: Artist, musician, DJ
- Years active: 1976-present

Meredith Stern (sometimes using the pseudonyms "Merry Death" or "Merry Def") is an artist, musician and disc jockey living in Providence, Rhode Island.

== Biography ==
Stern went to George School for high school. She later graduated Cum Laude from Tulane University in 1998 with a Bachelor of Fine Arts degree in ceramics. While living in New Orleans, she collaborated with fellow artists Brice White and Icky Apparatus to create Nowe Miasto, a do-it-yourself warehouse space that has since hosted hundreds of bands and workshops. While living in New Orleans, she wrote several zines, including Mine: An Anthology of Women's Choices and Mine: An Anthology of Reproductive Choices, and published several issues of a personal zine called Crude Noise.

In 2005 Stern moved to Providence, Rhode Island. She spent several years working as the program director for AS220. She is a linoleum block printer and a founding member of the Justseeds Artist Cooperative. Meredith has been a vegetarian since 1991 and a vegan since 1994. She currently lives in Rhode Island with her partner, film and theater director Peter Glantz.

== Art Installation Work ==
In 2006 she co-curated (with Pippi Zornoza) the "Pocket Change" printmaking show at AS220 featuring 15 contemporary printmakers. Artists included: Jo Dery, Mike Taylor, Neil Burke, Xander Marro, Kenn Speiser, Pippi Zornoza, Jenny Nichols, Cybele Collins, Meredith Stern, Alec Thibodeau, Kasey Henneman, Shawn Gilheeney, Brian Chippendale and Katie Truskoski. Also in 2006, Meredith and Erik Ruin collaborated on "Rude Awakenings" a two-person art show at Art of This Gallery in Minneapolis, Minnesota. In 2008 Stern curated Sustainable: Visions for a Living Planet, a printmaking show of local RI printmakers and Justseeds members.

She had a solo show of prints and collages at the Morning Glory Coffeehouse in Pittsburgh, Pennsylvania in February 2009. Her first solo show in Providence, RI was in April 2014 and was titled, "Generations | 8 Chapters Blooming" which featured a series of large collages and porcelain platters. The show was featured in the April 10, 2014, edition of the Providence Journal in an article titled, "Politics, Activism, and Cool Cats." The work was also reviewed by Greg Cook for the Providence Phoenix in an extended article about her and the work titled, "Personal Politics." In March 2009 and May 2013 she collaborated with other members of the Justseeds Artist Cooperative on an art installation at the University of Wisconsin–Milwaukee. In 2012 she was part of the installation of the Justseeds "Agit-Prop and Intervention" show in Berlin, Germany. In 2011 she was part of installing "Refuge" at Gallery Alkatraz in the 29th Graphics Biennial in Slovenia. In July 2008 she collaborated on a Justseeds installation titled "Out of the Shell of the Old" at Space1026 in Philadelphia, Pa. In 2012 she coordinated a print portfolio project called "This is an Emergency!". The project combines visual images and intergenerational essays. Over 2 dozen people collaborated to create work about gender justice. This portfolio is now in University archives around North America including the Sarah Doyle Women's Center at Brown University, Keene State College, Nova Scotia College of Art and Design, and many others.

In 2016 she created a project on the Universal Declaration of Human Rights. It was created as a print portfolio and as an offset printed booklet. The collection was purchased by several collections including the University of Connecticut. For her project, Stern made prints of the entire document, inserting relevant images into the text depicting violations of the document that take place in the U.S.

In February 2020 she had a solo show of printmaking and ceramic work at the AS220 Project Space in Providence, Rhode Island. It included 20 relief prints in her "Cooperation Cats" Series and the 32 Articles of the Universal Declaration of Human Rights. She also collaborated with her 4 year old child on several ceramic mugs and teapots.

In June 2026, she co-curated a Justseeds show at SPACE Gallery in Portland, Maine with Erik Ruin.

== Music Projects ==
Her first band was called the Foreheads and featured Alec (Icky) Dunn on Tuba, and Stella Schumaker on guitar. In 2001 they released a split 7-inch on Raw Sugar Records. In 2002 she played music with Deanna Hitchcock in a band called The Accident. In 2003 she played in a short lived band with Adee Roberson (of the band New Bloods) and Lacey and Billy in a band called Blood Truck. From 2007 to 2008 she played drums in the band Teenage Waistband with Jo Dery (artist) who sang, Mikey Stoltz (bass) formerly from the band Reactionary 3, and Kate Gronner (formerly of the band The Coughs). They released 2 cassette tapes. From 2008-2009 she played drums in Chastity Wig, with Mike Stoltz, and Robert Pickle.

Beginning in 2009 she began playing music in a feminist identified music project called Whore Paint with Reba Mitchell (of Made In Mexico) and Hilary Jones (of Sweetthieves and Arcing). The band was interviewed in 2013 by Jaime Lowe for Bust. Whore Paint was mentioned as a notable band in the December 24, 2013, issue of the Providence Phoenix in an article titled "Reeling through 2013." They also spoke at a panel at Wesleyan University in 2013. In 2013 Whore Paint released a full-length LP on Load Records and a music video directed by Peter Glantz.

Meredith played drums in a band called Alpha Error with Hilary Jones, Gus Martin, and Rosie in 2019. The band broke up during the covid pandemic.

Beginning in 2025, Meredith started playing in a band called Insomnies with Leela Corman and Hilary Jones.

She has done radio shows sporadically for over ten years. While living in New Orleans she spun on the World Of Punk radio show. She also had a show called Listening Party on BSR radio.

== Collections ==
Her work is in the permanent collection of Book Arts at the MOMA, the Library of Congress the RISD Museum and the Newport Art Museum. Her work is collected by dozens of universities including the Collins Memorial Library Collection at the University of Puget Sound Harvard University the Rhode Island School of Design, and the University of Michigan. Meredith has received project grants from the Rhode Island State Council on the Arts, the Puffin Foundation, the New England Foundation for the Arts, the Rhode Island Foundation, the Barbara Deming Memorial Fund, and Choice USA. She received the RISCA Merit Fellowship in Drawing and Printmaking in 2017 and the RISCa Fellowship in Drawing and Printmaking in 2019.

== Publications ==
Her work has been published in several poster collection books including "Green Patriot Posters: Images for a New Activism" edited by Dmitri Siegel and Edward Morris [2010], Metropolis Books, "Celebrate People's History!: The Poster Book of Resistance and Revolution" edited by Josh MacPhee, the Feminist Press [2010], Wunderground, and World War 3 Illustrated. She was interviewed in 2011 by "The Art Of Dismantling." Her artwork has appeared on several book covers of Radical Teacher Stern wrote an essay in Carving Out Rights from Inside the Prison Industrial Complex. Stern also orchestrated the chapter "Subversive Multiples: A Conversation between contemporary printmakers" on radical printmakers in the Josh MacPhee – Erik Ruin book Realizing the Impossible:Art Against Authority (AK Press, 2007). Her work has been published in magazines including Ms. Magazine and Poetry.

== Teaching ==
She has spoken at several colleges including Keene State College with Sue Coe at Wesleyan University, at the University of Connecticut Dodd Center at Nova Scotia College of Art and Design. In 2013 Meredith presented an artist talk on the Brown University campus entitled "Hear Us Roar! Surviving Contemporary Patriarchy Through Subversive Creation." The July 7, 2013, issue of the Providence Journal discussed her upcoming artist talk at the RISD Museum titled, "Getting Dirt Under Your Nails" as part of the Locally Made Exhibit. In March 2023 she spoke at her alma mater, Tulane University in New Orleans.

Stern began co-teaching a graduate class in the Illustration Department at the Rhode Island School of Design with artist Leela Corman in Fall 2024.

== Artistic Style ==
Meredith Stern is a feminist artist and curator who uses linoleum block prints and print collages as her primary medium. Her work focuses on cooperation and mutual aid. About her work she writes, "I hope to celebrate the ideas of love and peace and encourage everyone to believe that these ideas are possible for all of us. The path towards peace is a world where we all work together to eradicate fear and war and greed and competition. At the heart of social change, is mutual aid and cooperation which are the methods towards liberation for everyone." Her work uses an "intersectional feminist interruption" which she describes as a way "to create a path towards gender equality that operates beyond binaries, that specifically addresses the intersections of domination and discrimination between various forms of oppression. This framework depends on us working collectively and actively to shift our thinking, our institutions, our society and our culture." Her artistic influences include Elizabeth Catlett and Wangechi Mutu, as well as the artistic movements of German Expressionism, Russian Constructivism, and Dada. She often uses cats as the characters within her prints so the viewer can "allow themselves to be transported into the activities being presented in a fantastical and playful way."

== Representation in other media ==
She is featured in a documentary called "RI Art Archive Project: Female Forces: Women in RI Art" released in 2016 which features a dozen Rhode Island women artists and archivists. She is featured as an artist in Dr. Joseph Chazan's NetWorks 2016 documentary project of Rhode Island artists which screened on Rhode Island PBS. Her work has been used as set dressing in several tv shows and movies including the 2014 remake of Annie, the 2018 film Can You Ever Forgive Me? And in an upcoming film featuring Pete Davidson and directed by Judd Apatow called The King of Staten Island.
