= Ghost Quartet =

Musical by Dave Malloy

- CD cover
- Music: Dave Malloy
- Lyrics: Dave Malloy
- Book: Dave Malloy
- Premiere: October 8, 2014: Bushwick Starr, New York City
- Productions: 2015 Off-Broadway; 2015 Cambridge; 2015 San Francisco; 2016 Edinburgh; 2017 Off-Broadway; 2019 Chicago; 2019 Melbourne; 2019 Toronto; 2019 Off-West End; 2024 Sydney

Ghost Quartet is a musical song cycle written and composed by Dave Malloy. The show is described as "a song cycle about love, death, and whiskey. A camera breaks and four friends drink in four interwoven narratives spanning seven centuries."

== Synopsis ==
The story is told by four storytellers who portray multiple characters. It spans seven centuries and does not take place in any chronological order.

=== Side 1 ===
The musical begins with the storytellers introducing themselves ("I Don't Know").

A Photographer enters a camera shop to buy a new camera, having broken her old one. The Camera Shop Owner shows her a fiddle that belonged to her great-grandmother, Rose, that was made from the breastbone of Rose's sister, Pearl, and tells the story of the two sisters. Rose falls in love with an Astronomer and writes him poetry about the stars. The Astronomer, the editor of a prestigious astronomy journal, steals her work and publishes it under his own name before leaving her for Pearl. Furious, Rose asks a Bear to maul the astronomer and turn Pearl into a crow. In return, the Bear asks for one pot of honey, one piece of stardust, one secret baptism, and a photo of a ghost. It is revealed that Rose performed the baptism in the sea on a baby she abducted from a teenage mother ("The Camera Shop").

Starchild, the baby that Rose abducted and baptized, reflects on being blessed by a stranger and the impact it had on her life ("Starchild").

On a subway station, a Victim is pushed onto the tracks ("Subway").

In 1873, the Usher family is at the side of their teenage daughter, Roxie. Roxie's child, Starchild, has been stolen from her. As a result, Roxie has fallen deathly ill ("Usher, Part 1").

A Soldier reflects on her yearning for death. Rose arrives and seduces the Soldier to take her honey. The Soldier promises not to haunt Rose when she becomes a ghost ("Soldier & Rose").

The four storytellers sing about ghosts ("Any Kind of Dead Person").

=== Side 2 ===
The Astronomer introduces his character ("The Astronomer").

In the House of Usher, Edgar Usher, Roxie's father, calls a meeting to discuss Roxie's imaginary friend, the revived memory of Roxie's sister who died as a baby. Roxie's parents urge her to forget about her imaginary friend, but Roxie refuses and screams at them ("Family Meeting").

The four storytellers sing a song that personifies four types of whiskey ("Four Friends").

Edgar Usher encourages his son, the Fool, to leave home. The Fool makes plans to do so and leaves, leading his own life in the world ("Fathers & Sons").

In the House of Usher, Roxie cries out for her lost daughter, but is told by her family that she is gone. As a result, Roxie dies. Lady Usher vows to lock the corpse in a vault underneath the bedroom for a fortnight ("Usher, Part 2").

In the Astronomer's treehouse, Rose recites poetry about the stars and the Astronomer writes down her words. Later, the Astronomer and Pearl profess their love for one another ("The Telescope").

Rose searches for Scheherazade, an ancient storyteller. Rose asks for a piece of stardust and Scheherazade gives it to her, telling Rose the story of her life ("Tango Dancer").

Long ago, when Dunyazad, the sister of Scheherazade, was still alive, Scheherazade tells the story of David, the piano player and the ghost of Thelonious Monk living behind a hidden door. It is revealed that Dunyazad remembers nothing but her sister ("Monk").

=== Side 3 ===
In the House of Usher, a young Roxie asks her mother to read her Arabian Nights ("Lights Out").

It is revealed that the Photographer lost her camera after taking a photo of the Victim in the subway instead of saving her, leading her to throw her camera on the ground in disgust ("The Photograph").

Scheherazade finishes a story and proceeds to talk with her husband, Shah Zaman. Rose discovers the relationship between the Astronomer and Pearl and vows to take revenge. Later, Rose brings the Bear one pot of honey, one piece of stardust, one secret baptism, and a photo of a ghost. The Bear reveals that he never intended to kill the Astronomer and turn Pearl into a crow and tells Rose to take revenge herself ("Bad Men").

In the House of Usher, Lady Usher has gone mad following Roxie's burial. Edgar Usher reads her the story of the subway station to calm her. While he reads, they start to hear noises coming from Roxie's burial vault. Before Edgar can finish the story, Roxie breaks out of the vault, having been accidentally buried alive. She attacks and kills Lady Usher. On the subway station, the Victim, now revealed to be Pearl, is distracted and is pushed onto the tracks. The Photographer, now revealed to be Rose, has to make a decision whether she should save the Victim or take a photo of the ghost to give to the Bear. Rose chooses to take the photo and the Victim is killed ("Usher, Part 3").

The four storytellers vow to forgive themselves for their mistakes ("Prayer").

=== Side 4 ===
Rose laments about her mistakes and understands that she is not a hero ("Hero").

Rose and the Camera Shop Owner talk. The Camera Shop Owner reveals that she is the reincarnation of Pearl, the Soldier, and Lady Usher and reveals to Rose who she is the reincarnation of. Rose leaves the camera shop with the phone number of the Subway Driver written on her arm. Rose and the Subway Driver dance and have two daughters together ("Midnight").

The four storytellers tell the story of how Rose took revenge on Pearl and how Pearl's breastbone was turned into a fiddle ("The Wind & Rain").

== Original cast and characters ==
Ghost Quartet is‍

- Brent Arnold (vocals, cello, guitar, erhu, dulcimer, percussion)
- Brittain Ashford (vocals, autoharp, keyboard, percussion)
- Gelsey Bell (vocals, metallophone, Celtic harp, accordion, percussion)
- Dave Malloy (vocals, piano, keyboard, ukulele, percussion)

Each actor plays multiple roles; in the script, the following character allocation is used:

- Brent: Shah Zaman, Bear, The Fool, The Pusher
- Brittain: Dunyazad, Rose Red, (Starchild), Roxie, The Photographer/Rose
- Gelsey: Scheherazade, Pearl White, Soldier, Lady Usher, The Victim/Pearl
- Dave: Monk, The Astronomer, Edgar, The Driver

== Musical numbers ==
Side 1

- 1. "I Don't Know"
- 2. "The Camera Shop"
- 3. "Starchild"
- 4. "Subway"
- 5. "Usher, Part 1"
- 6. "Soldier & Rose"
- 7. "Any Kind of Dead Person"

Side 2

- 1. "The Astronomer"
- 2. "Family Meeting"
- 3. "Four Friends"
- 4. "Fathers & Sons"
- 5. "Usher, Part 2"
- 6. "The Telescope"
- 7. "Tango Dancer"
- 8. "Monk"

Side 3

- 1. "Lights Out"
- 2. "The Photograph"
- 3. "Bad Men"
- 4. "Usher, Part 3"
- 5. "Prayer"

Side 4

- 1. "Hero"
- 2. "Midnight"
- 3. "The Wind & Rain"

== Influences ==
The piece draws on numerous sources of inspiration, including Arabian Nights, Matsukaze (a Japanese Noh drama), Grimms' Fairy Tales, Edgar Allan Poe's "The Fall of the House of Usher", James Joyce's Ulysses, Rosemary Timperley's "Harry", Thelonious Monk's "Ruby, My Dear", "Epistrophy", and "'Round Midnight", The Twilight Zone (particularly "The After Hours" and "In His Image"), 2001: A Space Odyssey, David Bowie's Ziggy Stardust, Stephen Sondheim's Into the Woods, Cosmos (both the Carl Sagan and Neil DeGrasse Tyson versions), Stephen King's Dark Tower series, The Legend of Zelda and Castlevania, Neil Gaiman's Sandman, Bill Willingham's Fables, Ken Wilber's A Brief History of Everything, Tina Satter's Seagull (Thinking of You), Frozen, R. Umar Abbasi's NY Post photo, and "The Wind & Rain", a 17th-century English murder ballad.

The music is scored for four voices, cello, guitars, dulcimer, Celtic harp, erhu, autoharp, piano, keyboards and percussion, and is inspired by murder ballads, doo-wop, angular bebop, Chinese folk, Islamic adhan, and the music of Bernard Herrmann and George Crumb.

== Productions ==
The piece premiered in 2014 at the Bushwick Starr. The production starred Brent Arnold, Brittain Ashford, Gelsey Bell, and Dave Malloy, and was directed by Annie Tippe. Christopher Bowser was the production designer and James Harrison Monaco was the dramaturg.

The show was remounted at the McKittrick Hotel, home of Sleep No More, in January 2015 and ran through May 2015. Throughout 2015 the show went on tour, playing at various venues in New York State including Mt. Tremper Arts in Mt. Tremper NY (July 2015), American Repertory Theater's Club Oberon in Cambridge, MA (September 2015), San Francisco's Curran Theatre (October 2015), and the Edinburgh Festival Fringe (August 2016).

The show was also presented for a month-long engagement at the New York Theatre Workshop in October 2017, where it launched the inaugural season of Next Door at NYTW, a "new works program that provides a creative home for artists and theatre companies who produce their own work" in a 75-seat black box theater space. As stated on Gelsey Bell's Instagram, the run sold out within half an hour. Additional tickets were added for November 2017 and the show toured to the Seattle Theatre Group in January 2018.

The Chicago premiere of Ghost Quartet was presented from July 12 through August 17, 2019, by Black Button Eyes Productions. The cast included Rachel Guth, TJ Anderson, Alexander Ellsworth, and Amanda Raquel Martinez, who won a Joseph Jefferson Award for Best Performance in a Principal Role (Musical). The Production was also nominated for Best Production of a Musical, Best Ensemble, Best Direction of a Musical for Ed Rutherford, Best Music Direction for Nick Sula, and Best Projection Design for G "Max" Marvin IV.

An Australian production premiered in Melbourne's Gasworks Arts Park on August 14, 2019, by the Antipodes Theatre Company featuring David Butler, Melissa David, Patrick Schnur and Willow Sizer. This production was revived in November 2021 at the Meat Market Stables in North Melbourne with returning cast members David Butler, Patrick Schnur and Willow Sizer and new cast member, HaNy Lee. The production was revived again in January 2025, playing Sydney's Hayes Theatre with returning cast members Butler, Lee and Sizer being joined by Cameron Bajraktarevic-Hayward. Understudies for this Sydney season were Sam Hamilton, Charlotte Kerr and Felix Star.

Ghost Quartet made its Canadian debut in Toronto on October 5, 2019, presented by Crow's Theatre and Eclipse Theatre Company, directed by Marie Farsi and featuring Beau Dixon, Hailey Gillis, Kira Guloien, and Andrew Penner.

Ghost Quartet premiered in London as the inaugural production of the newly refurbished Boulevard Theatre on October 24, 2019, and closed on January 4, 2020.

In June 2025, the original stars Malloy, Arnold, Ashford, and Bell will reunite at Green-Wood Cemetery for three performances in honor of the ten year anniversary since the premiere.

== Notable casts ==
Character	World Premiere	Off-Broadway	United Kingdom premiere	Off-Broadway revival	Australia premiere	Canada premiere	Chicago premiere	Off-West End
Character	2014	2015	2016	2017	2019			
Rose Red	Brittain Ashford	Brittain Ashford	Brittain Ashford	Brittain Ashford	Melissa David	Hailey Gillis	Rachel Guth	Carly Bawden
Pearl White	Gelsey Bell	Gelsey Bell	Gelsey Bell	Gelsey Bell	Willow Sizer	Kira Guloien	Amanda Raquel Martinez	Maimuna Memon
The Astronomer	Dave Malloy	Dave Malloy	Dave Malloy	Dave Malloy	David Butler	Andrew Penner	TJ Anderson	Zubin Varla
Bear	Brent Arnold	Brent Arnold	Brent Arnold	Brent Arnold	Patrick Schnur	Beau Dixon	Alexander Ellsworth	Niccolò Curradi

== Critical response ==
The piece was well received by the New York press; Ben Brantley in the New York Times called it "rapturous... this happily haunted song cycle speaks in many styles. The voguish term "mash-up" doesn't begin to capture its breadth or its quirky sincerity... Ghost Quartet uses languages as varied as gospel, folk ballads, honky-tonk anthems of heartbreak, electropop, doo-wop and jazz à la Thelonious Monk... directed with unobtrusive cunning by Annie Tippe... Mr. Malloy is infectiously in love with the dark arts of storytelling in all its forms..."

== Recordings ==
On October 31, 2014, the album was released by the ensemble via Bandcamp. On July 1, 2016, a live cast recording from the show's run at the McKittrick Hotel was released. On March 15, 2020, during the COVID-19 pandemic, Dave Malloy uploaded a full video recording of the same live performance on his YouTube channel.

== Awards and nominations ==
=== Original Off-Broadway production ===
Year	Award	Category	Result
2015	Drama Desk Award	Outstanding Music	Nominated
2015	Drama League Award	Outstanding Musical	Nominated
2015	Off-Broadway Alliance Awards	Best Unique Theatrical Experience	Nominated

=== Original Cambridge Production ===
Year	Award	Category	Result
2016	Elliot Norton Awards	Outstanding Visiting Production	Won
