= Josh MacPhee =

American artist

- Born: Holliston, Massachusetts
- Education: Oberlin College
- Occupations: Artist, Curator, Stonemason

Josh MacPhee is an artist, curator, and activist living in Brooklyn, New York.

== Career ==
Josh MacPhee's work as a socially-engaged artist and designer focuses on the production and distribution of political graphics. Originally from Holliston, Massachusetts, MacPhee was influenced at an early age by the work of Seth Tobocman and Peter Kuper. He attended Oberlin College and studied media and culture while publishing the zine Fenceclimber. After two years at Oberlin, MacPhee moved to Washington, D.C. where he helped create a community space called Beehive and collaborated on founding the D.C. chapter of the Anarchist Black Cross Network as part of MacPhee's broader burgeoning involvement in prison reform. MacPhee returned to Oberlin in 1994 and graduated in 1996, continuing his prison reform work on campus. Following graduation, he moved to Boulder, Colorado, for a year to work with the Prison Rights Project before moving to Chicago.

His work against mass incarceration has continued, including a major 2013 public transit and commuter train design campaign with Philadelphia Mural Arts as well as design campaigns with the Close Rikers campaign.

In 2001, MacPhee co-organized the Department of Space and Land Reclamation in Chicago with Emily Forman and Nato Thompson. He also participated in "Rising Up", an exhibition with Rankin Renwick (then known as Vanessa Renwick) at Tollbooth Gallery, and Toby Room in 2004 with the project Celebrate People's History that featured wheatpaste art along with experimental video in public spaces, and included work by Cristy Road, Sabrina Jones, Carrie Moyer, Laura Whitehorn, David Lester, and Eric Drooker. As part of the God Bless Graffiti Coalition, he collected and exhibited the work of 275 graffiti artists from around the world; some of this material was later made available in a box set.

MacPhee is featured in the film Creative Violation: the rebel art of the street stencil.

MacPhee served as the juror for the Third Coast National in 2008, an exhibition of eclectic artworks by artists from across the United States at K Space Contemporary in Corpus Christi, Texas. In 2019, MacPhee served as a juror for the Scholastic Art & Writing Awards in the printmaking category.

=== Justseeds ===
MacPhee spent eight years as an artist and activist in Chicago, Illinois, where he established a distribution system called Justseeds in order to get more radical art projects out to the public. At its inception in 1999, Justseeds primarily functioned as a mail order system offering art by MacPhee; now the Justseeds Artists' Cooperative is a cooperative of 25 like-minded artists.

=== Celebrate People's History Poster Project ===
The Celebrate People's History poster series originated during MacPhee's tenure in Chicago, and has become an ongoing project with the participation of artists from around the globe who create posters highlighting the contributions of important radical figures and events. The first poster in the series depicted Malcolm X, followed by a poster of John Brown. These are produced as educational materials and distributed inexpensively as a teaching tool on radical history. By 2018, over 100 designs had been printed in the series, with over 300,000 posters distributed, and an exhibition featuring selections from this project was mounted at the Brush Gallery at St. Lawrence University.

=== Spectres of Liberty ===
MacPhee was a member of the artist collaborative Spectres of Liberty with Olivia Robinson and Dara Greenwald, which used an inflatable reproduction of the Liberty Street Church to examine, spread awareness of, and create dialogue around the history of slavery and abolition in the United States. Their work as a collective was featured in volume 13 of Aspect Magazine.

=== Occuprint ===
As one of the first artists to respond to the Occupy Wall Street protests with artwork, MacPhee built on Adbusters's use of the image of the Charging Bull of Wall Street to make it a popular visual representation of the Occupy movement's focus on capitalism's destructive tendencies. His "Money Talks Too Much" poster featuring the charging bull was reproduced as a sign for protesters to carry at marches. MacPhee played a role in Occuprint, a group of volunteers who came together to curate and produce graphics for use in Occupy protests. The work of Occuprint focused on curating submissions of graphic material and making them available through a website, for reproduction around the world, thereby cultivating a network of graphic design material to be used as an organizing tool for Occupy movements worldwide.

=== Curatorial work ===
MacPhee was curator of the politically charged printmaking exhibition, Paper Politics, which toured North America beginning in Chicago in 2004. It included an international group of approximately 200 artists including Sue Coe, Swoon, Sixten, Dara Greenwald, Tyler Kline, Meredith Stern and Meek, and focused on a broad range of political issues including peace, justice, social equity, and the environment; many works responded very directly to the war in Iraq. Various mediums were included in the show, including screenprint, stencil, and linocut. Every piece in the exhibition was printed by hand. Subsequent installation locations included 5+5 Gallery in Brooklyn, NY (2005-2006), Milwaukee (2006), Dowd Gallery at SUNY Cortland (September–October 2008), the Red House in Syracuse, NY (December 2008), Ghostprint Gallery in Richmond, VA (August 2009), West Central Illinois Arts Center (March–April 2010), and Space gallery in Pittsburgh, PA (August, 2010).

In 2008 he co-curated the exhibition Signs of Change: Social Movement Cultures 1960's to Now with Dara Greenwald. This exhibition focused on material produced by activist movements around the world.

In 2017, MacPhee curated Commonwealth: Water for all at the Queens Museum, focusing on crises in water management around the globe. Exhibition material highlighted protests in response to the 2016 proposal of the Dakota Access Pipeline, including a series of prints from the Justseeds Artists Cooperative, and was presented alongside the museum's panorama of New York City.

=== Interference Archive ===
Josh MacPhee was one of the cofounders of Interference Archive. This organization focuses on the intersection of social movements and cultural production, illustrating the history of social movement organizing through access to and display of cultural ephemera. MacPhee's personal collection of social movement publications, graphic material produced for organizing, and punk and DIY material culture, served as a major part of the original collection of Interference Archive alongside the collection of Dara Greenwald.

== Creative production ==
=== Signal ===
MacPhee has published Signal: A Journal of International Political Graphics and Culture (PM Press) with Alec Dunn since 2010. This ongoing series shares and provides commentary on political graphics, with full-color reproductions of a wide variety of graphic material.

=== Pound the Pavement ===
Pound the Pavement is a zine series featuring a variety of topics often related broadly, but not exclusively to street art and graffiti.

=== An Encyclopedia of Political Record Labels ===
In 2019, MacPhee published a compendium of information about political music and radical cultural production which focused on vinyl records and the labels that released.
