= Shawny Williams =

Shawny Williams is the first African American police chief of the city of Vallejo, California. In September, 2019 Williams was tapped as the next police chief after Chief Andrew Bidou stepped down. He was sworn in as the police chief in November 2019. He has pledged to move the police department in a new direction and to stay transparent and accountable. By 2020, after a year as police chief, he had instituted a number of reforms including banning choke holds, instituting a mandatory body-worn camera and a clear de-escalation protocol. In September 2020 he announced what he called operation PEACE which is a community program to engage residents more to help solve crimes.

In July 2022, Williams received an official vote of no confidence from the Vallejo Police Officers’ Association.

In November 2022, Williams resigned his position and was paid $408,000 for doing so.

It has been claimed that Williams lied under oath (perjury) during his time as Chief of Police. If investigated and found to be true, this would decertify Williams by POST and preclude him from being employed by another police agency in California under SB2

Prior to becoming the police chief, Williams was with the San Jose Police Department for 26 years and was most recently the head of their investigations division.

Williams has a Bachelor of Arts degree from Simpson University and a Master of Arts degree from Fort Hays State University in Organizational Leadership. He graduated from the FBI National Academy in 2012. Williams speaks Spanish.
