= Presente.org =

Online advocacy group

Presente.org is the largest online advocacy group for Latin American immigrants in the United States. It was co-founded by journalist Roberto Lovato and artist and activist Favianna Rodriguez in 2009 in order to "amplify the political voice of Latin@s" across the country and to help offer sustainable and stable standards of living for Latino immigrants whose political representation has been largely overlooked within the contemporary American society.

Since its establishment, Presente.org, a Latino organization based in Los Angeles, CA, organized various social movements such as "BastaDobbs.com" and received recognition for its contributions to improving empowering political rights for Latino immigrants. In 2015, a presidential candidate for the Democratic Party, Bernie Sanders, hired Arturo Carmona, the former executive director of Presente.org, as the Latino Outreach and Southwest political director for his presidential campaign.

== Mission & Tactics ==
The ultimate goal of Presente.org is to extend "the political imagination and traditional boundaries" for Latino immigrants and promote social justice by implementing information technology and transforming cultural norms and notions for color, race and gender among individuals in the United States. The organization seeks to become a primary online hub for Latino community across the country.

There is a wide array of tactics that Presente.org implements in order to accomplish its fundamental goal including but not limited to:

- Offering Calls to Action through email, social media, and text message
- Organizing local-scale community events and house parties
- Advertising its events on radio and television

== Leadership ==
Presente.org believes that making a collective voice for Latinos of "all nationalities, generations, and regions" is indispensable for ultimately expanding the political spectrums for Latino community and other minority groups in the United States. Thus, it primarily focuses on online activation where individuals join and support its events through online petitions. To maximize the effectiveness of the organization's strategy, Presente.org is vertically structured with a group of several experts in social movements. At the moment, there are 8 members in the team including different positions of:

- Executive Director
- Senior Advisor
- Technology Consultants
- Campaign Consultants and Strategists

By structuring the management team in such a way, Presente.org attempts to draw the maximum number of participations in its online petition movements. With the advent of social media, Presente.org also actively makes use of existing social media platforms such as Twitter and Facebook where it promotes different social movements and receives charitable donations.

== Campaign Archive ==
Since its foundation, Presente.org has organized numerous social movements that influenced various aspects of the American society including climate justice, criminal justice, economic justice, human rights, immigration and media bias. Among these, there are several movements where Presente.org succeeded in bringing benign changes to the lives of the Latino community in the United States.

- "Basta Dobbs Campaign": In 2009, Presente.org coordinated "BastaDobbs.com, a Latino-led coalition" critical of TV anchor Lou Dobbs' xenophobic commentary. For a number of years, CNN's well-known news anchor, Lou Dobbs made "disrespectful and dehumanizing" claims regarding the Latino immigrants in the United States. In response to his biased commentary on news media, Presente.org created video contents, ran advertisements, and organized local-scale community events in order to call for Lou Dobbs' resignation from his position. On November 11, 2009, Lou Dobbs actually decided to leave CNN after receiving harsh criticisms from the public and activists. According to Sasha Costanza-Chock, the campaign organizers' clever use of broadcast media and social media played an important role in determining the success of "BastaDobbs" campaign.
- "Tell President Obama: Don't Deport Antonio": Antonio Vanegas, a worker in a federally-owned building, received incomes below minimum wage for a number of years. Thus, with other co-workers, Antonio Vanegas organized a one-day strike at the entrance of the building. Unfortunately, however, Antonio Vanegas was at the brink of deportation after the strike. In support for improving workplace experiences and conditions for the Latino community in the United States, Presente.org provided calls to action through email, social networks and text messages, and successfully stopped the Federal government's plan for deporting Antonio.
- "Victory Over Arpaio! Help Make It Permanent": Maricopa County Sheriff Joe Arpaio was criticized for his "unconstitutional immigration patrols in Arizona." Some of Sheriff Joe Arpiao's policies include racial profiling and establishing a hostile and inhumane immigrant detention camp. In response to this discriminatory policy implementation that devastated the quality of life of immigrants in Maricopa County, Presente.org sent hundreds of thousands of email to individuals calling for support for the Puente Human Rights Movement which is an Immigrant advocacy group based in Arizona. On November 9, 2016, Joe Arpaio failed to attain the bid for his seventh term as a Maricopa County Sheriff, and was accused by federal prosecutors for his continuing unconstitutional patrols against immigrants in Arizona.
