= Gelsey Bell =

American singer, songwriter, and actress

- Education: Lehigh University (BA); New York University (PhD)
- Occupations: Actress; singer

Gelsey Bell is an American singer, songwriter, and actress, best known for her experimental music, as well as her portrayal of Princess Mary in the 2016 Broadway musical Natasha, Pierre, & the Great Comet of 1812 and her performance in the original cast of Ghost Quartet.

== Early life and education ==
Bell was raised in northern California. Her father is a philosopher and her mother is a musician. Bell's sister, Biba Bell, is a choreographer and dancer, and the sisters created a collaborative performance for the first time in 2016.

Bell attended Lehigh University and received a BA with a double major in music and theatre and a minor in philosophy in 2004. She went on to New York University, graduating with a PhD in Performance Studies in 2015. Bell has several published performance studies pieces.

== Career ==
=== Music ===
Bell creates experimental music, and often breaks the fourth wall during live performances. She has written solo albums as well as operas, song cycles, and improvisational pieces.

In 2007, Bell joined thingNY, a New York collective of experimental composer-performers. The group has created three concert-length operas: This Takes Place Close By, ADDDDDDDDD, and Time: A Complete Explanation in Three Parts. Bell was particularly praised for her performance in This Takes Place Close By; one critic called her "pure, translucent chorister's soprano" the "icing on the sonic cake.". In 2011, Bell co-founded the collective Varispeed, best known for durational performances of works by Robert Ashley and John Cage.

In 2012, Bell wrote and premiered Scaling, a song cycle, as a part of the Vital Vox Festival. The piece involved many forms of unconventional piano-playing, such as Bell lying on top of the piano and singing while playing. Bell wanted to express a connection between physicality, lyrics, and the way the songs were presented. Great Weather for Media called Bell's work "fresh" and "on the edge of what's happening."

Earlier in her career, Bell released a number of albums as a singer-songwriter, including Under a Piano (2005), February (2008), and In Place of Arms (2010). Most recently, she released Ciphony in collaboration with composer John King, which documented their work with Compagnie CNDC-Angers and Robert Swinston in restaging Merce Cunningham's EVENT. On Ciphony, Bell made use of not only her voice but vocoder and metallophone.

=== Theatre and opera ===
In 2012, Bell first became involved with Natasha, Pierre, & the Great Comet of 1812, an electro-pop opera based on War and Peace. She never auditioned for her role, and was instead asked by composer Dave Malloy to come in for its initial workshops, as he had written a part with her in mind. Bell's vocal skills inspired the opera-within-an-opera section of the musical. She refers to the project as her first real acting job, since in most of her other theatrical and musical experiences she was free to portray herself. Bell portrayed Mary Bolkonsky in the musical's initial performances at Ars Nova Theater, and continued with Great Comet through its Kazino run and its 2016 opening on Broadway. The performance marked Bell's Broadway debut. Bell was praised for bringing a "compelling light" to Princess Mary, and for her "impressive intense vocal control".

Bell worked again with Malloy as part of the original cast and co-arranger of Ghost Quartet (performing vocals as well as metallophone, Celtic harp, accordion, and percussion), and stayed with the show while it performed at various venues all over the US. Bell was praised by critics for her "astonishing vocal versatility," and was referred to as the "standout vocal performance."

In 2014, Bell was a performer in Crash, which was the last work of composer Robert Ashley. Crash is unique among Ashley's operas as it is performed completely a capella, with four voices audible at any given moment. The composer wrote the parts with Bell and her Varispeed colleagues in mind. Bell compared Ashley's work to "discovering a garden where different plants blossom on each visit.".

In 2015, Bell collaborated with Erik Ruin to create the show Prisoner's Song, an exploration into life in prison. Bell and Ruin utilized music, images, and recorded testimonials from former convicts in the piece. The pair additionally collaborated to create an art installation shown in Eastern State Penitentiary.

Bell was a featured performer and vocalist in the 2014 operatic film River of Fundament by filmmaker Matthew Barney, with composition by Jonathan Bepler. She has also collaborated on operas with composers Kate Soper (composer) and John King, and has worked with choreographers Kimberly Bartosik and Yasako Yokoshi.

Bell presented her evening-length piece "mɔɹnɪŋ [morning//mourning]" at HERE Arts Center in January 2023 as part of the Prototype Festival

=== Awards ===
In 2017, Bell was one of the select group of artists recognized by The Foundation for Contemporary Arts and awarded a sound/music grant. Bell has also received residencies and commissions from the Jerome Foundation. Bell's Bathroom Songs was included in the 2015 iterations of MoMA PS1's Greater New York exhibition.

== Performance credits ==
Year(s)	Production	Role	Location	Category
2010	Quarterly Arts Soirée	Performer	Webster Hall	New York
2011	Scaling	Performer & Composer	Roulette in Brooklyn	Vital Vox: A Vocal Festival
2012	Natasha, Pierre & The Great Comet of 1812	Princess Mary Bolkonskaya	Ars Nova	Off-Broadway
2013	Natasha, Pierre & The Great Comet of 1812	Princess Mary Bolkonskaya	Kazino Meatpacking District	Off-Broadway
2013	Banana Bag & Bodice's Beowulf: A Thousand Years of Baggage	Warrior 1	Abrons Arts Center	New York
2014	Crash	Performer	Whitney Biennial	New York
2014	Ghost Quartet	Pearl White, Sheherazade, Soldier, Lady Usher, Camera Shop Owner	Bushwick Starr	Off-Off-Broadway
2014-2015	Ghost Quartet	Pearl White, Sheherazade, Soldier, Lady Usher, Camera Shop Owner	McKittrick Hotel	Off-Broadway
2015	Crash	Performer	Roulette in Brooklyn	Off-Broadway
2015	Prisoner's Song	Co-writer, performer	Roulette in Brooklyn	Off-Broadway
2015	This Takes Place Close By	Performer	Knockdown Center in Queens	New York
2015	Ghost Quartet	Pearl White, Sheherazade, Soldier, Lady Usher, Camera Shop Owner	American Repertory Theater	Regional
2015	Ghost Quartet	Pearl White, Sheherazade, Soldier, Lady Usher, Camera Shop Owner	Curran Theatre	Regional
2015-2016	Natasha, Pierre & The Great Comet of 1812	Princess Mary Bolkonskaya	American Repertory Theater	Regional
2016	Ghost Quartet	Pearl White, Sheherazade, Soldier, Lady Usher, Camera Shop Owner	Edinburgh Festival Fringe	Regional
2016-2017	Natasha, Pierre & The Great Comet of 1812	Princess Mary Bolkonskaya	Imperial Theatre	Broadway
2017	Ghost Quartet	Pearl White, Sheherazade, Soldier, Lady Usher, Camera Shop Owner	New York Theatre Workshop	Off-Broadway
2018	Ghost Quartet	Pearl White, Sheherazade, Soldier, Lady Usher, Camera Shop Owner	Seattle Theatre Group	Regional
2019	Improvement (Don Leaves Linda)	Linda	The Kitchen	New York
2023	mɔɹnɪŋ [morning//mourning]	performer	HERE Arts center	New York
2025	Ghost Quartet	Pearl White, Sheherazade, Soldier, Lady Usher, Camera Shop Owner	Green-Wood Cemetery	Ten Year Anniversary Concert

== Discography ==
as Gelsey Bell

- This is Not a Land of Kings (Gold Bolus Recordings, 2018)
- SCALING live at roulette (2012)
- In Place of Arms (2010)
- love is just a crack in the space of you (2009)
- February (2008)
- Under a Piano (2005)
- Live at the Wildflower (2004)

With The Chutneys

- HOME (Gold Bolus Recordings, 2019)

With Joseph White

- Toyland (Gold Bolus Recordings, 2017)

With John King

- Ciphony (Gold Bolus Recordings, 2017)

With thingNY

- minis/Trajectories (Gold Bolus Recordings, 2016)

With Varispeed

- Empty Words (Gold Bolus Recordings, 2019)
