= Interference Archive =

Volunteer-run political art archive in New York City

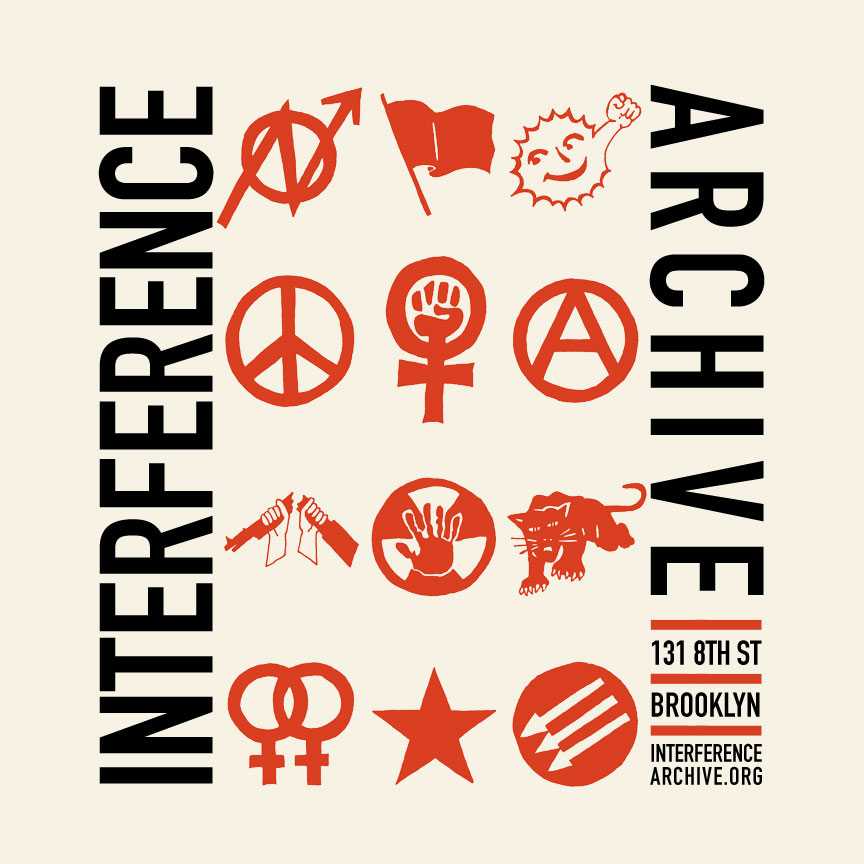
- 40.672487°N 73.991402°W
- Location: 314 7th Street, Brooklyn, New York 11215, United States
- Type: Archive
- Established: 2011

Other information
- Website: http://interferencearchive.org/

Interference Archive is a volunteer-run library, gallery, and archive of historical materials related to social and political activism and movements. Interference archive is located in the Park Slope neighborhood of Brooklyn, New York City.

== History ==
Interference Archive began as the personal collection of Josh MacPhee and Dara Greenwald, activists who told the New York Times that they had filled their home with so much "social movement memorabilia ... Ph.D. students would visit to conduct research." The idea to turn it into a public resource began in 2008 when the couple was asked to curate an exhibition at the Exit Art gallery in Manhattan. Using the title "Signs of Change," it showcased cultural artifacts produced by those engaged with groups organizing to foment change. MacPhee and Greenwald also point to archives and libraries of similar scope and purpose as inspiration, including another Brooklyn-based organization, the Lesbian Herstory Archives.

In 2010, MacPhee and Greenwald moved their collection to a warehouse in Gowanus, in collaboration with activists and artists Molly Fair and Kevin Caplicki. Greenwald named it Interference Archive, referring to "the idea that the collection causes static, or interference, in institutional archives and in the larger society." It opened its doors to the public in December 2011 with a punk and feminism themed exhibition in tribute to Greenwald, who had been struggling with endometrial cancer and died the following month.

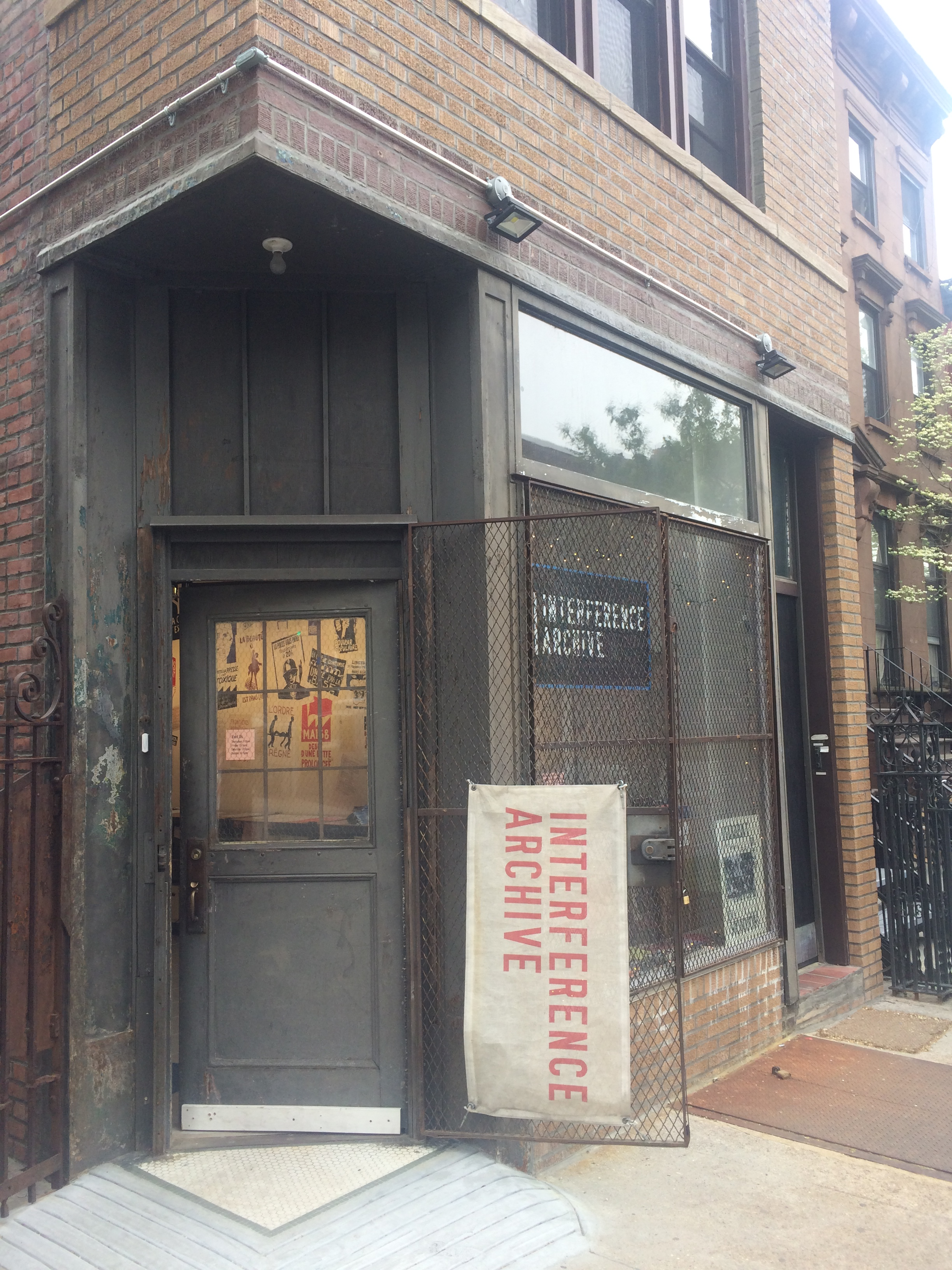
Exterior of the Interference Archive's location in Park Slope, Brooklyn

The rising prominence and popularity of the Occupy movement emerged as one specific motivation around the time of the Archive's opening, when its founders observed among Occupy participants a need for information about social movements of the past.

Interference Archive has broadened its activities significantly since opening, operating as a library and community space and hosting regular talks, art exhibitions, performances, workshops, and other events.

The Guardian's Edward Helmore, assessing the place of the Archive among other arts institutions, described it as "far removed from the realm of commercial art galleries, oligarch collectors, the show-palace museums of billionaire real estate developers, and under the watch of gun-toting revolutionaries from several decades back — and is far the richer for it."

In 2014, the library operated on a yearly budget of less than $25,000, supported primarily by donations from a community of financial sustainers.

In October 2017, after being evicted from their space in Gowanus, the archive relocated to the nearby Park Slope neighborhood of Brooklyn and reopened to the public in December 2017. The inaugural exhibit in the new space entitled no. NOT EVER opened in January 2018. The exhibit was a multidisciplinary and video-based exploration of "the rise of white nationalism" in America.

== Collection ==
The archive is housed in an open floor-plan storefront space, filled to the ceiling. The collection includes a number of different kinds of media artifacts which provide information and illustration about the histories of radical political movements around the world, with 40% of the archive coming from outside the United States. Among the materials are posters, fliers, pamphlets, zines, stickers, T-shirts, books, graphic novels, newspapers, games, videos, leaflets, buttons, audio recordings, and other ephemera. The topics it covers includes ACT-UP, Occupy Wall Street, Arab Spring, Code Pink, Pink Bloque, Rock for Choice, Latin American art, nature, ecology, feminism, punk rock, criminal justice, prison reform, apartheid, anti-nuclear movement, squatting, anarchist bookfairs, May 1968 events in France, and Dutch anti-fur activism.

MacPhee summarizes the conceptual basis for the collection as "material produced by people organizing to transform the world".

The owners and volunteers take a pointedly nontraditional approach to archivism. In selection and acquisition, no priority is given to particular movements, media types, or well-known artists. Instead, it positions itself as a commons where people can share what they have and benefit from what was donated by others. Whereas most archives stress materials protection and preservation, the Interference Archive promotes access, physical engagement, and use of the materials to maintain their continued relevance outside of the Archive. Collections are also organized for usability, prioritizing media type and subject over donation or donor.

== Events and activities ==
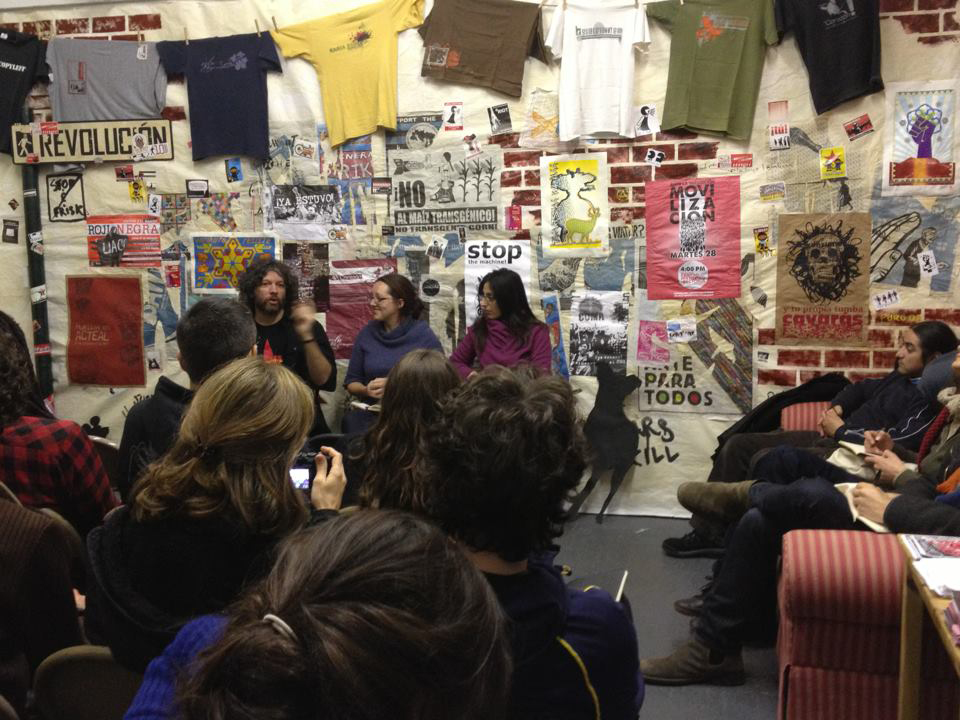
La Persistencia de los Sueños / The Persistence of Dreams event, a retrospective of the work of Mexican graphics collective Sublevarte in November 2012

In addition to its primary purpose as an archive and library, Interference Archive also functions as a multipurpose community center, gallery, and events space. Past events and exhibitions have covered prison reform, the Asian American movement in New York, underground newspapers, the anti-nuclear movement, and Art+Feminism edit-a-thons.

Armed by Design, a 2015 exhibition, comprised graphic art from Tricontinental, a magazine published by the Cuba-based anti-globalization, anti-imperialist, anticapitalist organization OSPAAL (Organization of Solidarity with the People of Asia, Africa and Latin America). The Guardian described it as "a fascinating tour of 60s and 70s radical politics and its heroes".

In addition to historical materials and preexisting cultural products, the Archive occasionally commissions artists to produce original work. For Armed by Design, the 60s and 70s graphics were supplemented by a new set of topical posters. Another exhibit, if a song could be freedom... Organized Sounds of Resistance, included a series of annotated mixtapes compiled by musicians, historians, and activists.

One exhibit in April 2013 featured "book blocs", home-made cardboard shields glued together by activists for use during college tuition protests. The shields on display as well as others made during a workshop earlier in the month were confiscated as weapons by the New York Police Department the day before they were due to be used at Cooper Union in a protest against the school's decision to begin charging tuition.

Since 2015, volunteers have hosted a podcast which highlights material in the collections and associated exhibits.
