= Dylan Miner =

American printmaker and academic (born 1976

Dylan A. T. Miner
- Born: 1976 (age 49–50); Michigan
- Citizenship: American
- Education: University of New Mexico (Ph.D.)
- Website: dylanminer.com

Dylan Miner (born 1976} is an American artist and assistant professor at Michigan State University.

== Art ==
As an artist, Miner has exhibited at the Institute of American Indian Arts, the United Nations Permanent Forum on Indigenous Issues, National Museum of Mexican Art, Native American Rights Fund, La Galería de la Raza, and Nokomis Center. His working-class comics are included in Studs Terkel’s Working: A Graphic Adaptation (New Press, 2009) and Wobblies: A Graphic History of the Industrial Workers of the World. In 2005, as part of the centennial celebrations of the founding of the IWW, Miner’s two-person exhibition with Carlos Cortéz Koyokuikatl traveled throughout North America and the world. In 2010, he was awarded an Artist Leadership fellowship from the National Museum of the American Indian. From this award, he created the exhibition Anishinaabensag Biimskowebshkigewag (Native Kids Ride Bikes). In 2010 and 2011, Miner had nine solo exhibitions, Urban Shaman Gallery, in Winnipeg, Manitoba and various university galleries. In 2015 he exhibited at the Martha Street Studio, in Winnipeg. In 2016 he did a residency in Regina, Saskatchewan in collaboration with the MacKenzie Art Gallery, and the Dunlop Art Gallery.

Miner is a member of Justseeds Radical Artist Collective. He co-founded the Campesina/o Collective.

== Controversies ==
Chris Andersen (Métis), professor and director of the Rupertsland Centre for Métis Research at the University of Alberta, critiques Miner's use of Metis identity and iconography in his book "Métis": Race, Recognition, and the Struggle for Indigenous Peoplehood. Andersen criticized Miner's racialization of Métis identity to support arguments for a Metis presence in locales with little Red River–based iconography.

Miner is a former member of the Woodland Métis Tribe of Ontario, which is not affiliated with the Métis National Council. He is now registered with the Métis Nation of Ontario.

== Selected articles ==
- "Dylan Miner: An Anti-Authoritarian Artist on Bikes Beyond Borders," by David P. Ball, Indian Country Today Media Network
- Métis Artist and Indigenous Activist: Dylan Miner, interview by America Meredith, First American Art Magazine, N° 1, Fall 2013
