= Killing of Willie McCoy =

2019 police killing of a black man in Vallejo, California, United States

- Date: February 9, 2019
- Time: 22:00
- Location: Vallejo, California
- Type: Shooting
- Participants: Ryan McMahon; Collin Eaton; Bryan Glick; Jordon Patze; Anthony Romero-Cano; Mark Thompson
- Deaths: Willie McCoy

Willie McCoy, also known as Willie Bo, was a 20 year old African-American rapper, killed by six police officers in Vallejo, California, on February 9, 2019. The officers had responded to a 911 call of an unconscious man in a vehicle in a Taco Bell drive through, when they found McCoy, with a .40 caliber handgun (later determined to be stolen from Oregon) with an extended magazine on his lap.

== Background ==
=== Early life and rapping ===
McCoy lost both parents to cancer by the time he was 12 years old. He did well at sports in school, and earned his GED before dropping out to pursue music. Collaborators noted his work ethic and desire to succeed. Under the stage name Willie Bo, he was part of the group FBG (Forever Black Gods), performing songs about what NBC News described as "money, guns, and street violence," which a collaborator suggested was because "they needed to conform their lyrics, to look cool. I saw it more as a cool thing — kids see you on YouTube like you have all this money." Other lyrics related to overcoming challenges, such as growing up without a father.

On Wednesday, April 11, 2018, Willie McCoy was arrested for kidnapping and human trafficking by San Francisco police; Oakland police subsequently served a search warrant on Willie McCoy's residence, seizing "numerous" firearms, and charging him with weapons violations. The kidnapping and human trafficking charges arose from an incident where a woman stated that she was forced into a car driven by McCoy with multiple occupants and driven to another location where she escaped. The kidnapping and human trafficking charges were later dropped.

It is unclear what McCoy's role was in the theft of a .40 caliber semi-automatic handgun he was carrying when he died.

=== Police department ===
Around the time of McCoy's shooting, Vallejo Police Department had about 100 officers serving a city of approximately 122,000 people. Under its Police Chief at the time of McCoy's shooting, Andrew Bidou, it had increased officer training programs and undertaken community outreach initiatives. However, residents had expressed concerns about the department's use of force.

From 2015–2017, Vallejo PD spent more per officer in fines or settlements for civil rights abuse claims than any other large police force in the Bay Area. From 2016 to 2019, five of Vallejo's police officers shot multiple people. At the time of McCoy's shooting, one of the officers who shot him was a defendant in a civil lawsuit for shooting a man dead in February 2018.

== Shooting ==
Around 10:30 pm February 9, 2019, McCoy was found unconscious at the drive-through of a Vallejo, California Taco Bell, in his car, with a .40 caliber semiautomatic handgun, while the engine was running and the car in drive. A Taco Bell employee called 911, informing the dispatcher that McCoy (who was not identified by name at this point) was unresponsive to people knocking on the car's window or honking their car horns. Six police officers arrived, and activated their bodycams.

The bodycam video and audio, which the police published March 30, 2019, showed that, for several minutes, officers with guns raised conversed next to McCoy's car while he was unconscious. The footage captured an officer saying that McCoy had on his lap a gun with its magazine "half out" such that McCoy would have at most one shot available; although the gun is not visible in the footage. The footage shows that the officers then decided to open the door to retrieve the alleged gun and remove McCoy from the car, but found the door locked and so instead attempted to block McCoy's car in the drive-through. After some minutes, McCoy scratched his shoulder, though there is no indication he was alert or aware of his surroundings at this time.

McCoy then moved in a manner that was interpreted by the Vallejo Police Department as "hand reaches to gun on lap". The Guardian stated that the videos at that point are "blurry" and "show McCoy’s body moving slightly, but do not capture his hand moving to the firearm, which is not visible in the footage." NBC News said, "McCoy then jerks up and appears to reach down. His face is obscured by the officer's arm, pointing his gun." KTVU said McCoy "seems to bend from the waist and move his left arm." The New York Times said, "The footage showed that Mr. McCoy appeared to be asleep for at least several minutes, and that he was shot about 10 seconds after he began to move. It was unclear whether he was reaching for a gun."

According to the bodycam footage and witness footage, officers then yelled at McCoy, through the closed car window, to put his hands up, and fired at him less than three seconds later. The six officers fired 55 rounds at McCoy over approximately four seconds, before again telling McCoy to put up his hands.

McCoy was pronounced dead at the scene.

== Reactions ==
Vallejo police initially said that McCoy had a gun in his lap, and that officers had opened fire when he did not respond to demands to put his hands up and instead reached downwards. Police also said that this gun had been reported stolen in Oregon.

McCoy's family called the incident "execution by a firing squad", and expressed skepticism that McCoy had a gun. According to McCoy's family and their attorney, around the time of his death McCoy was fatigued from recent touring and recording.

One of the family's attorneys, who had previously worked in a coroner's office, said McCoy had received roughly 25 wounds in the shooting. The family said McCoy had been shot in the head, ear, neck, chest, arms, shoulders, hands, and back. At the end of February 2019, the family filed a wrongful death claim against the city.

As of March 5, 2019, the Solano County district attorney's office had not responded to journalists' requests for information about an inquiry into the shooting. On March 13, 2019, Vallejo's police chief, Andrew Bidou, announced his retirement amid criticism of his department's conduct. (Vallejo Mayor Bob Sampayan said Bidou's retirement was long-planned, not due to recent criticism of the department. City officials echoed this, voting unanimously for Bidou to remain until succeeded.) The same day, some members of McCoy's family were permitted to see police footage of the shooting (their lawyer was allegedly refused), based upon which they said that McCoy appeared to still be asleep when the police opened fire, and did not appear to have reached for a gun.

On March 30, 2019, allegedly without notifying McCoy's family, Vallejo police published officers' bodycam videos from the shooting. In an annotation on the footage, police alleged that McCoy had on his lap, prior to the shooting, a gun loaded with an extended 14-round magazine (not a gun with the magazine "half out" as mentioned by an officer in the footage).

In April 2019, McCoy's family said that the handgun McCoy had was for his protection. The police said the gun was stolen.

In January 2024, the city of Vallejo agreed to pay $5 million to McCoy's family.
