= Favianna Rodriguez =

American artist, activist (b. 1978)

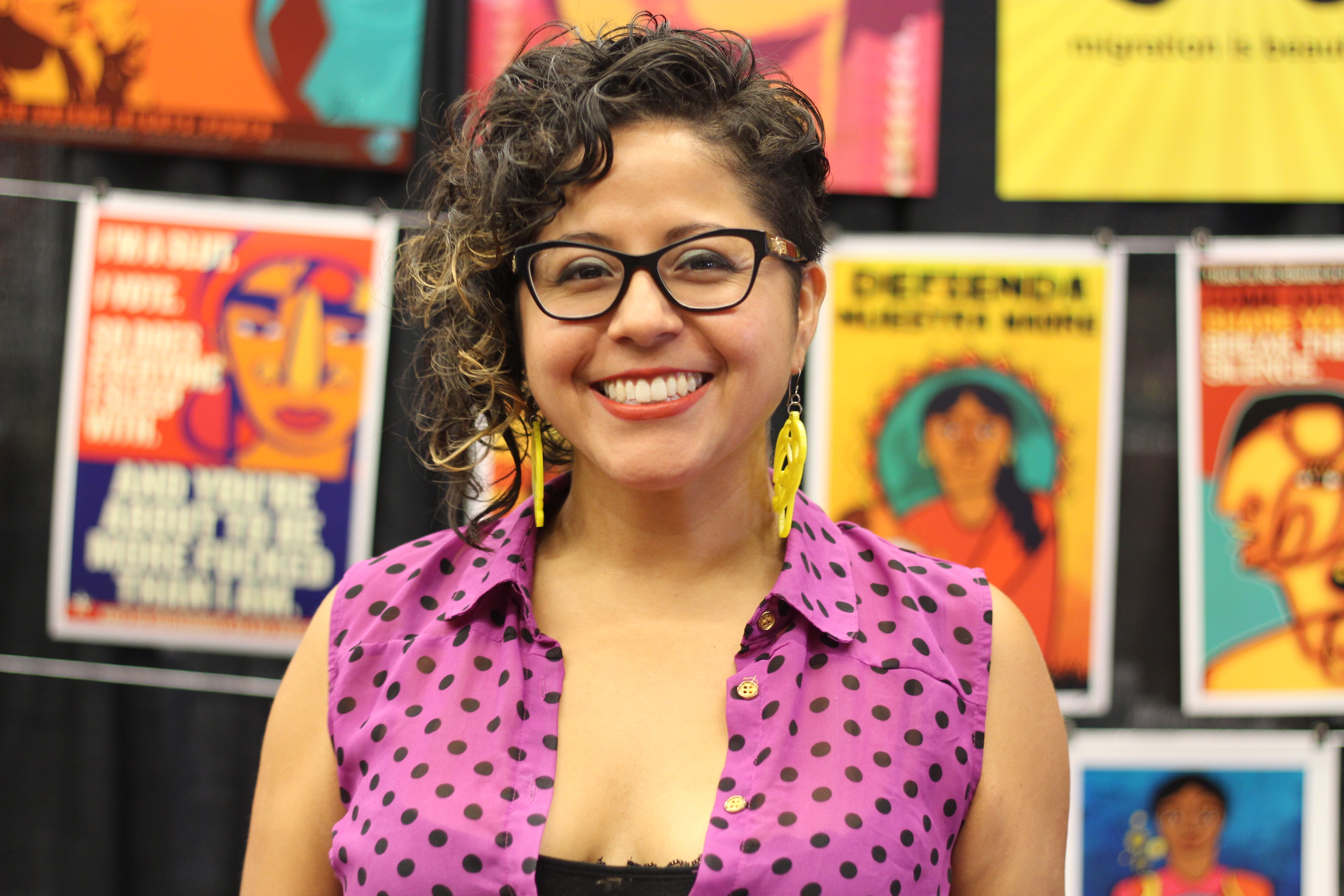
- Favianna Rodriguez at the 2018 National Women's Studies Association's conference
- Born: September 26, 1978 (age 47); Oakland, California, United States
- Occupations: Visual artist, activist, muralist, nonprofit director
- Known for: Collage, painting, printmaking

Favianna Rodriguez (born September 26, 1978) is an American visual artist, and activist, known for her work in political posters, graphic arts, and public art. Her artwork topics include global politics, economic injustice, interdependence, patriarchy, migration, and sexual liberation. She worked as a director of the National Arts Organization CultureStrike, in which writers, visual artists, and performers engage in migrant rights.

== Early life and education ==
Rodriguez was born in the Oakland, California in 1978, in the Fruitvale neighborhood. Her parents are Peruvian and migrated to California in the late 1960s. Rodriguez herself identifies as a queer latina with Afro-Peruvian roots. She attended Centro Infantil school in Oakland in her early childhood. In Mexico, Rodriguez became interested in political artwork. Learning from politically-engaged works of Frida Kahlo, she began to identify with both Kahlo herself and her powerful political works.

Fruitvale is a predominantly Latino neighborhood. Here, Rodriguez experienced and became aware of anti-Latino racism. She observed that students from her community were under-served by the school system and were profiled as gang members, and that women of color suffered negative representation in the media. Rodriguez went to live in Mexico City from age 13 to 15, first with her aunt and then in a rented room. She became interested in politically engaged artwork, learning about the political context of murals, and learning more about the work of Frida Kahlo, with whom she further identified. When Rodriguez returned to Oakland, she began to respond to anti-immigrant and anti-latino policies in California by associating herself with other Latino activists. She began staging walkouts and creating flyers. Her political artistic career began to really take shape. When she was 16, California Proposition 187 was introduced, marking state level anti-immigrant legislation.

After graduating from Skyline High School in Oakland in 1996, Rodriguez received numerous scholarship offers and chose to attend the University of California, Berkeley. She withdrew at age 20, indicating she wanted to follow her path rather than limit herself to her parents' wishes. She was inspired by printmaking, to which she was introduced by Chicana artist Yreina Cervantez, and decided to pursue a career in political art.

== Career ==
Rodriguez began as a political poster designer in the 1990s in the struggle for racial justice in Oakland, California. Her designs and projects range across a variety of different issues including globalization, immigration, feminism, patriarchy, interdependence, and genetically modified foods. Rodriguez studied the history of political art, including the artwork and graphics associated with the Black Panthers and the 1970s feminist movement, through her residency at the Center for the Study of Political Graphics in Los Angeles.Rodriguez was drawn to posters and reproducible art like printmaking for their power to educate, organize, and liberate communities.

Rodriguez has worked closely with artists in Mexico, Europe, and Japan, and her works have appeared in collections at Bellas Artes, The Glasgow Print Studio, and the Los Angeles County Museum of Art. In 2003, with Jesus Barraza, Rodriguez helped establish the Taller Tupac Amaru print studio to promote the practice of screen printing among California-based artists and foster its resurgence. Rodriguez also co-founded EastSide Arts Alliance and Cultural Center, an organization of artists and community organizers intended to promote community sustainability through political and cultural awareness and leadership development. She serves on the board of Presente.org, a national online organizing network dedicated to the political empowerment of Latino communities.

== Awards and exhibitions ==
- 2024, Favianna Rodriguez: Power From The Roots, solo exhibition, Eloise Pickard Smith Gallery, University of California, Santa Cruz, Santa Cruz, California, U.S.
- 2021, New Time: Art and Feminisms in the 21st Century, group exhibition, BAMPFA, Berkeley, California, U.S.
- 2017 Multicultural Center at the University of California, Santa Barbara, Santa Barbara, California
- 2016 Recipient of the Creative Work Fund Award, San Francisco, CA
- 2016 Yerba Buena Center for the Arts, San Francisco, California, U.S.
- 2015-2016 Museo del Barrio, Manhattan, New York, U.S.
- 2011 Recipient of Innovation Grant, Center for Cultural Innovation, Los Angeles, CA
- 2010 Inducted into Women's Hall of Fame (Alameda County) in Arts & Culture, Alameda County, CA
- 2007 Recipient of Innovation Grant, Center for Cultural Innovation, Los Angeles, CA
- 2006-2007 Mexican Fine Arts Center, Chicago, Illinois, U.S.
- 2006 Recipient of the Belle Foundation Individual Artist Award, San Jose, CA
- 2005 Art Is A Hammer Award from the Center for the Study of Political Graphics, CA
- 2005 Parco Museum, Tokyo, Japan
