= Jessica Sabogal =

Colombian-American muralist and stencil spray paint artist

Jessica Sabogal (born 1987) is a queer Colombian-American muralist and stencil spray paint artist who is currently active in the Bay Area. She's best known for her "Women Are Perfect! (If You Let Them)" visual campaign which she created as an artist in residence in 2014 at the Galeria de la Raza, and she is currently active in the "We The People" public art campaign created in collaboration with Shepard Fairey.

== Life and timeline ==
Sabogal was born and raised in San Francisco, California. She is the daughter of Colombian immigrants who came to America for a better education and to escape the normalization of violence and terror caused by the Pablo Escobar drug market. She graduated from UC San Diego in 2009 with a bachelor's degree in Political Science and became involved in stencil spray painting. Soon after, she began to publicly display and sell her artwork locally on the East Coast. Her first solo exhibition entitled "Womyn So Empowered Are Dangerous" opened in Northampton, Massachusetts in 2010 and later that year Sabogal opened her first Bay Area exhibition entitled "La Mujer Es Mi Religion". This same year, Sabogal received one of her earliest major commissions from Penguin Books in which she designed the 20th anniversary cover of Dorothy Allison's novel Bastard Out of Carolina that was released a year later. Soon after, she became the first female artist to be commissioned by Facebook to paint a series of panels at their headquarters in Menlo Park. Her work has also been part of Facebook's "Getting More Women in Tech" video. In addition to Facebook her murals have been commissioned by Google, 20th Century Fox, USC( University of Southern California), UCSF, CSU San Marcos, University of Arizona, and University of Utah and her work has been featured in national and international media such as CNN, The New York Times, The Wall Street Journal, and many more. Sabogal has since displayed her works in exhibitions throughout Oakland and San Francisco. She also has previously been sponsored by major spray paint supplier Montana Cans. She has also designed pieces for the artist's collective Unceded Voices, an Anti-Colonial Street Artist's Convergence based in Montréal for indigenous and women of color street artists. In 2014, Sabogal became the first artist in residence and mural coordinator for the Galería de La Raza, a non-profit arts organization which features Latinx and indigenous artistic identity in San Francisco's Mission District. Jessica Sabogal won the KQED’s Women to Watch Award in 2016. The following year, her artwork “Women Are Perfect” was the imagen of the 2017 Women’s March on Washington.

Sabogal paves the way for fellow women artists, not only through her recognition but through extending a hand and including them in her projects. In an interview titled “ITW #2- Jessica Sabogal” Sabogal states she works in a male dominated area of art and loves to teach female volunteers when she can. Providing them with the skills necessary to speak their truths and tell their stories. Throughout this interview Sabogal is working on a piece called Justice for All Indigenous Women. After she completes her work Sabogal expresses, “Basically, when I walk into a museum or gallery... I never see myself represented in art. And so, a lot of the subjects…and things that I chose for research and then paint on are ways that I can see myself in art. And that’s being a woman of color, a queer, a daughter of immigrants.” This is important because Sabogal is telling the story of people who do not have a platform to speak on. She works to ensure that her murals are familiar and are not foreign to the communities where the murals are presented. In addition, each piece provides insight into the person she is, because she connects to them on some level. She starts every mural as a research project and researches the people living in that community, the demographics and impact it will bring to that community.

== Selected works ==
=== "This Type of Love" and " White supremacy is killing me" ===
Sabogal’s art named “This Type of Love'', she creates a message about the relationship between other girls and indigenous women to emphasize the theme self-affirmation. In the image presented by Awad and Wagoner, the painting demonstrates two women looking down at the other. Sabogal creates her murals by first checking the environment and location where her work will show and next by addressing relevant issues to the area, including the positive portrayal of queer people and immigrants. Sabogal's murals have become community landmarks, such as her painting of an indigenous woman holding a placard that reads "White supremacy is killing me", which was created to send a political message about how white supremacy oppresses indigenous people. Her murals depicted messages attempting to empower and uplift oppressed minority groups, with a particular focus on women and queer people whose rights are being violated.

=== "Women Are Perfect! (If You Let Them)" ===
In 2014 Sabogal held an artistic campaign entitled "Women Are Perfect!", an exhibition hosted by the Galería de la Raza which featured much of her own work in addition to pieces submitted by 27 other self-identifying women of color from across the nation. This campaign was meant to serve as a tribute to female identity, specifically to the lived experiences of indigenous women and women of color who have been left out of the prevailing narrative of "womanhood".

==== "Women Are Perfect Mural" ====
Women Are Perfect Mural is a 45’ x 9' mural painted in 2013 to honor the women who were most affected by Colombia's 49-year long civil war. This mural depicts four different women in a blue background. The first girl from the left is a teenager who wears a hat. She is looking at the sky without a smile on her face but full of worries and sufferings from the war. The second girl from the left is The Middle Eastern woman with the veil. She looks like a brave figure who's calling out people to resist and fight. Just like the figure represents, during the civil war, there were lots of women who were encouraging and dedicated for social improvements. For example, In the OFP (Women's Popular Organization), women fought against the limits to rights and freedoms, and they engaged in connecting displaced women and families to provide basic services and train young women to develop leadership. The little girl on the right side of The Middle Eastern woman is also wearing a hat. She's laughing freely with the pure, innocent and carefree smile on her face. The last woman on the right is placing her gaze with firmness. She is Karmen Ramirez Boscan, a leader of the Wayuu indigenous people of La Guajira, Colombia. In this mural, she's the symbol for women's rights and the female voice that's not heard in the mainstream media.[5] These four women represent the major population of women. In the society, there are women with worries and fear who need help and protection. There are strong women who are ready to fight the fight and take actions to deal with the struggles. There are hopeful, innocent, and pure women who should be respected, appreciated, instead of being sexualized. There are also faithful and brave women who want their voice to be heard. Sadly the Colombian society did not give women a chance to be seen and to be heard. Their feelings were not noticed, and the efforts they paid were ignored.

Sabogal wishes to use this mural to show the values of women. Women not only have lower social status, but they are also suffering from the violence against them, from both rape and intimate partner violence. It brings them both short and long-term problems, including physical injury and illness, psychological symptoms, and, in extreme cases, death. After learning that 18% of Colombian women were victims of sexual violence between 2001 and 2009, Sabogal wanted to use this piece of art to encourage women to embrace their perfection and criticize the crimes against humanity. This mural is simple but powerful. It delivers the message that women are great, and they should be loved, respected, honored, and deeply remembered.

=== "Justice for All Indigenous Women" ===
When commissioned for a mural in Canada Sabogal began to research further into events of concern in the area. According to Sabogal, she quickly discovered “3,000 indigenous women had been missing or murdered since 1980.” Further disturbing to her findings is that indigenous women are more likely to be victims of this type of violence. In 2014, Sabogal created the mural Justice for All Indigenous Women. It was a beautiful product calling attention to a serious issue. The colors of this piece are incredibly bold, which is the intent of Sabogal. She wants to catch the attention of the public, “even if it’s subliminally.” At the center of this piece is a smiling indigenous woman. This social issue now has a face, creating the empathy that Sabogal hoped to achieve through her work.

=== "Our Existence Will No Longer Be Silenced..." ===
One of Sabogal's larger projects is a 30 foot tall mural located in Montreal. Created in 2015 during the annual Decolonizing Street Art Convergence, it depicts a lesbian couple alongside the quote "Our Existence Will No Longer Be Silenced, we require no explanations, apologies, or approvals". The foundational image used for this mural is also a part of Shepard Fairley's "We The People" Public Art Campaign and has become a popular political image and poster in the queer and activist community.

=== "Este Barrio No Se Vende (This Neighborhood is Not For Sale)" ===
On June 9, 2018, Sabogal's mural that depicts artist and activist Ella Mendoza was unveiled. The mural titled "Este Barrio No Se Vende (This Neighborhood is Not For Sale)" was painted in Salt Lake City. Sabogal states that she prefers to work in smaller towns, like Salt Lake City, because she feels that the artwork has a larger impact and that this impact is felt more intensely by the viewer. The mural was made for the people in the community that had lived and worked for many generations in the western Salt Lake area. Sabogal states that her main goal for the mural is "...to make you curious about your apprehension to the work, to sit in it and have the uncomfortable conversations about it."

=== "In This Classroom, There Are No Walls" ===
In February 2019, Sabogal revealed a mural titled "In This Classroom, There Are No Walls" that was painted at California State University San Marcos. The mural is located in the school's Kellogg Library and it covers 760 square feet of a wall on a stairwell. The mural depicts six students and alumni that attend the school and they were chosen in order to represent the different nationalities, identities, sexualities, genders, abilities, and other walks of life that students in the school may face. Sabogal states that, "When I envisioned this mural, well before I ever met the students who would be featured, I didn't want to portray joy – even though it may evoke joy, validation or visibility for others – I wanted the mural to evoke a fearlessness in the subjects, who were stoic and serious about being a united front regardless of their identities and standing behind the message."

"Protect Our Trans Daughters"

"Protect our trans daughters" is a mural painted by graffiti artist Jessica Sabogal and Shanna Strauss in honor of Chyna Gibson, who was murdered in New Orleans. A grand opening of the mural (located on the side of the Lavender Library in Sacramento, California) was held on March 31, 2018, to "coincide with the internationally recognized event known as the Transgender Day of Visibility, a day dedicated to celebrating the transgender community and raising awareness of discrimination faced by trans people worldwide." The mural is of Gibson's mother holding her up with her hands, with the statement of her mother's willingness to not just proudly support Gibson but to "uplift her in life through acknowledgment of well-being, identity, and spirit." The mural sheds light on the trials and tribulations Black trans women are currently experiencing today. It is a political message from Sabogal that cannot be denied or ignored because the message is placed publicly for everyone to see. Sabogal asserts that "Muralism brings validation instead of trying to take something from us."

“You Are Not Free Until All of Us Are Free” and “We Are the Ones We've Been Waiting For”

"You are not free Until all of us are free", was created for the Visual Solidarity campaign in 2017. Its message is that while people from other races, identity and religion are struggling, we must work together to uplift their condition. "We are the one We’ve been waiting for", is a mural created in June, 2014 and is painted in Thomas L. Berkley Way and Telegraph, Oakland and conveys the message that the next generation are the ones who are going to fix the mess created by this generation.

== List of works and exhibitions ==
Title	Year	Location	Type
Womyn So Empowered Are Dangerous	2010	Northampton, Massachusetts	Solo Exhibition
"La Mujer Es Mi Religión"	2010	Oakland, California	Solo Exhibition
Bastard out of Carolina	2011	None	Book Cover Design
Facebook Panels	2011	Facebook Headquarters - Menlo, Park	Diva-themed panels
Tribute to Egypt	2010/2011	None	Stencil Ill
Women are Perfect! (If You Let Them)	2014	La Galeria de La Raza	Collaborative Exhibition
Unknown	2013	Bogotá, Colombia	Mural
Youth So Educated Are Dangerous	2013/2014	24th and Bryant, San Francisco	Collaborative Mural
Better Than Perfect	2013	Betti Ono Gallery, Oakland	Solo Exhibition
Justice for All Indigenous Women	2014	Montréal, unceded territory	Mural
Los Hijos of the Revolution	2015	Stevenson and 6th, San Francisco	Mural
Perfection Is My Right	2015	Stevenson and 6th, San Francisco	Mural
We Are the Ones We've Been Waiting For	2015	Downtown Oakland	Mural
Our existence will be no longer silenced. We require no explanations, apologizes or approval.	2015	Montréal, unceded Kanien'kéhá:ka and Algonquin territories	Mural
Toypurina	2015	Mission Cultural Center's	Mural
Los Gordos	2016	MACLA	Mural
Womxn Are Perfect!	2016	Galería de la Raza, San Francisco, California	Group Exhibition
White Supremacy is Killing Me	2017	Montréal, unceded Kanien'kéhá:ka and Algonquin territories	Mural
Protect Our Trans Daughters	2018	Sacramento, California	Mural
In This Classroom, There Are No Walls	2019	California State University, San Marcos, California	Mural
