= Jesus Barraza =

American artist

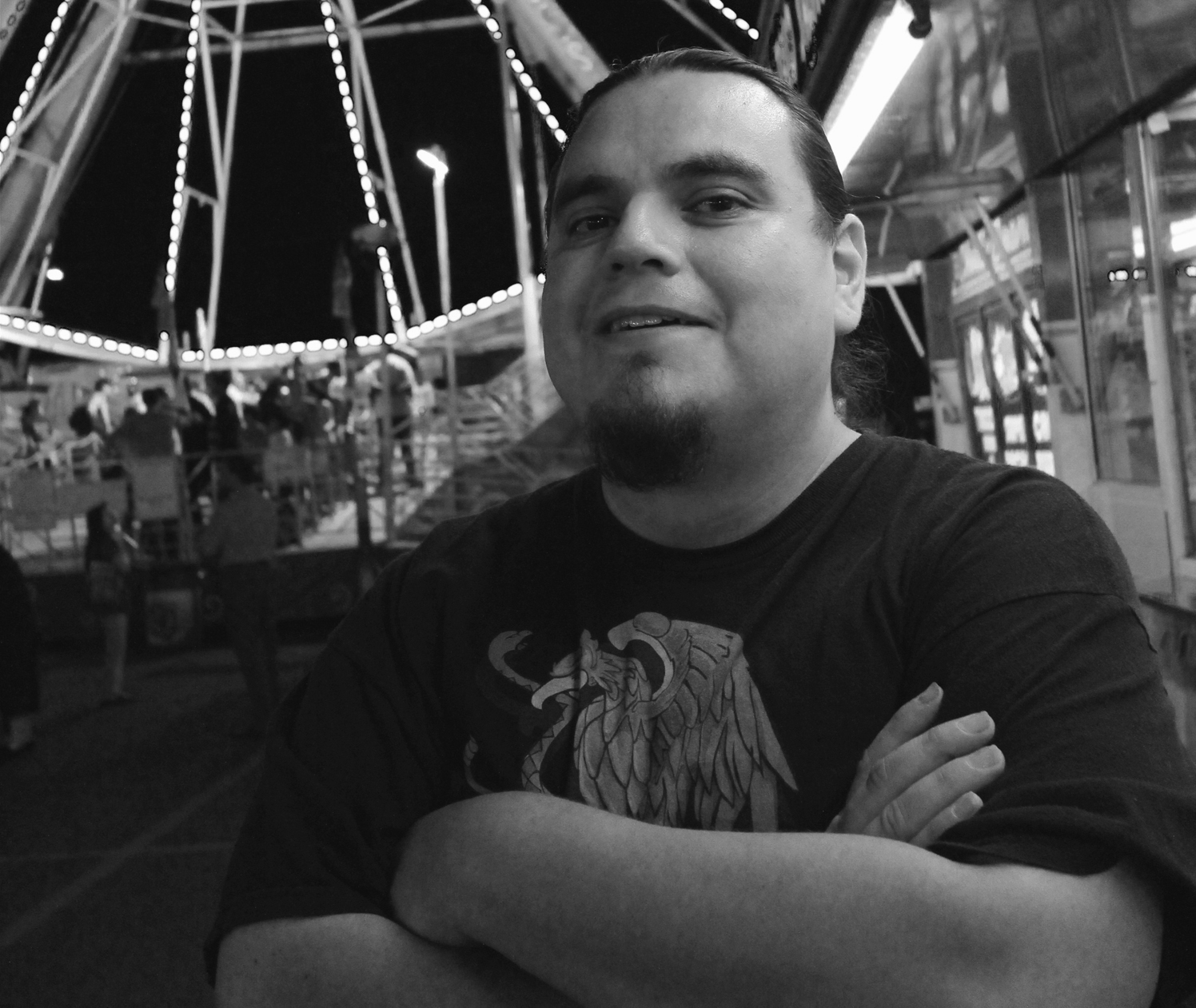
Jesus Barraza, photo by Melanie Cervantes, 2011

Jesus Barraza (born 1976), is an American printmaker and graphic artist. He started working as a layout editor in 1994 of the Xicana oppositional newspaper La Voz de Berkeley. He worked as a graphic designer for student groups at UC Berkeley, community organizations and with Elizabeth "Betita" Martinez designing Shades of Power, the newsletter for the Institute for Racial Justice.

== Biography ==
Jesus Barraza was born in 1976 in El Paso, Texas, U.S.

In the late 1990s Barraza became known for his designs for issues regarding the defense of Ethnic Studies, affirmative action, immigrants rights, woman's rights and youth activism. During this time Barraza worked for MEXA, third world Liberation Front (twLF) at UC Berkeley, Olin, National Network for Immigrant and Refugee Rights (NNIRR), Schools Not Jails, National Association of Chicana and Chicano Studies (NACCS) and Mujeres Activas en Letras y Ciencias (MALCS).

In 2001, Barraza worked at the Mission Cultural Center for Latino Arts (MCCLA), in the San Francisco's Mission District as a graphic designer. While working there Barraza worked with Juan R. Fuentes, to create screen printed posters for the Centers events at Mission Grafica, the printmaking studio at MCCLA. During the two years Barraza worked at MCCLA, he created dozens of screen printed posters and prints and had the opportunity to be mentored by Fuentes, Calixto Robles and Michael Roman in various screen printing techniques.

In 2003 Barraza left MCCLA to work at Tumis Design as a Graphic Designer, where he co-founded the Taller Tupac Amaru with Favianna Rodriguez and Estria Miyashiro. As a graphic designer at Tumis, Barraza worked with community organizations, non-profits and foundations to design collateral materials and websites. In 2006 Tumis co-founders Rodriguez and Miyashiro offered Tumi's workers a share in the company making them all co-owners and partners. Barraza worked at Tumis as a web developer, heading on over 50 web projects, before leaving at the beginning of 2010.

As a member of the Taller Tupac Amaru, Barraza has partnered with community organization to produce posters to help with the work they do. In 2005 Barraza and Rodriguez received the Art is a Hammer award from the Center for the Study of Political Graphics for the outstanding work with the Taller Tupac Amaru. Barraza has produced over 250 screen prints and posters. Barraza has printed editions for artists including Melanie Cervantes, Favianna Rodriguez, Tony Carraza, Malaquias Montoya, Emory Douglas, Barbara Carraco, Juan R. Fuentes, Ester Hernandez, Rupert Garcia and Enrique Chagoya.
