= Futurity (musical) =

2012 indie rock album and musical by César Alvarez and the Lisps

Studio album by the Lisps
- Released: March 16, 2012
- Genre: Indie rock; folk; musical theater
- Length: 52:32
- Label: Extropian

The Lisps chronology
Are We at the Movies? (2011)	Futurity (2012)

Futurity is a 2012 indie rock concept album and stage musical by the American experimental rock group the Lisps, featuring music and lyrics by César Alvarez and a book by Alvarez with co-librettist Molly Rice. (Note: Molly Rice was a co-librettist for the original A.R.T. production, but parted ways with Alvarez shortly after, with her credit being changed to "Story Development and Additional Text") Developed from songs Alvarez wrote in 2008, the work blends American Civil War fiction with speculative science to imagine a Union soldier and the mathematician Ada Lovelace building a steam-powered “brain” that might end warfare.

Early workshop concerts were presented at Bard College in 2008 and in New York City the following year. After further festival and residency development, the fully staged world premiere opened in March 2012 at the American Repertory Theater's Oberon space in Cambridge, Massachusetts, then toured to the Walker Art Center in Minneapolis. The Lisps self-released a 17-track studio recording that same year, serving as both a standalone album and the show's original cast soundtrack. The piece fuses folk, bluegrass and indie rock instrumentation with ensemble vocals to create its steampunk alternate history. The story is presented through letters and songs as Private Julian Munro and Lovelace pursue a cog-and-gear calculating machine while confronting the human cost of war and the limits of technology.

Critical response to the 2012 productions was mixed, with reviewers consistently praising the inventive score while noting uneven storytelling. A revised production, co-presented by Soho Rep and Ars Nova, opened Off-Broadway at the Connelly Theater in October 2015 to warmer notices; The New York Times named it a Critic's Pick. The run extended into November and the musical won the Lucille Lortel Award for Outstanding Musical for the 2015–16 season.

== Background and development ==
César Alvarez conceived Futurity in 2008 as a cross-genre experiment blending historical fiction with futurism. Initially, Alvarez wrote a series of songs for their MFA thesis at Bard College, imagining a Civil War soldier with scientific dreams. The Lisps performed early versions in concert format, first a 45-minute workshop at Bard in July 2008, then gigs at New York City in 2009. These workshops featured the band (Alvarez and Lisps co-founder Sammy Tunis among them) in the lead roles, alongside homemade percussion instruments. Over time, the concept album evolved into a theatrical piece, as Alvarez realized the story "wanted to be a musical" with a narrative through-line. Playwright Molly Rice joined as co-librettist, expanding the project into a full book musical.

In 2010–2011, Futurity continued to develop via festivals and residencies (including Ars Nova, New York City). The Walker Art Center in Minneapolis became a commissioning partner, supporting the piece's refinement. By late 2011 the band launched a Kickstarter to fund a studio album recording and vinyl pressing of Futurity, the album was eventually self-released on the Lisps' own label, Extropian Records.

== Productions and releases ==
The world premiere stage production of Futurity was mounted by the American Repertory Theater (A.R.T.) in Cambridge, Massachusetts. Previews began March 16, 2012 at A.R.T.'s club-like Oberon venue, and it ran through April 15, 2012. Directed by Sarah Benson of Soho Rep, the premiere starred César Alvarez as Julian Munro and Sammy Tunis as Ada Lovelace, with a cast of A.R.T. Institute actors and the band members performing onstage. The production featured specialized design: a "steam brain" machine built from junkyard scraps and percussion instruments was central to the set. Following the Cambridge run, A.R.T.'s production traveled to Minneapolis for a limited engagement at the Walker Art Center in late April 2012 (as part of the Walker's Out There series).

On October 6, 2012, the Lisps held an album release concert for Futurity at 92YTribeca in New York. The studio album, recorded by the band, had been made available in 2012 (digitally released in March 2012). This album serves as both a standalone concept album and the original cast recording, featuring 17 tracks of music from the show.

Futurity eventually made its way to Off-Broadway. The Off-Broadway premiere opened in October 2015, co-produced by Soho Rep and Ars Nova. Under Sarah Benson's direction, the New York production began previews on October 6, 2015, at the Connelly Theater and officially opened on October 20, 2015. Alvarez again starred as Julian, alongside an ensemble that included Karen Kandel as Ada (in the Off-Broadway incarnation, Tunis had departed) and a cast of downtown NYC performers. The Off-Broadway run, which extended to November 2015, was met with critical interest and later recognized with the Lucille Lortel Award for Outstanding Musical of the 2015–16 season.

== Concept and synopsis ==
Futurity is set in an alternate-history American Civil War environment infused with steampunk fantasy. Its protagonist, Julian Munro, is a Union Army private and budding inventor who is deeply disillusioned by war. Through letters, Julian enters into an unlikely correspondence with Ada Lovelace, the real-life British mathematician often credited as an early computer visionary. Julian shares with Ada his grand idea: constructing a cog-and-gear powered artificial intelligence (dubbed the "Steam Brain") that could "end all human strife" by solving the fundamental problem of war. Ada becomes intrigued by the concept and lends her expertise from afar.

As Julian's regiment marches through wartime trials (skirmishes, camp life, and encounters with a paternalistic superior known as The General), he and Ada work in parallel on plans for the peace-bringing machine. Ada faces skepticism from her mother, Lady Byron, and from the constraints of her 19th-century society, while Julian contends with the horrors and camaraderie of war. The musical unfolds partly through their epistolary dialogue; letters carried across the stage, and partly through ensemble-driven folk-rock songs that voice the characters' inner hopes and doubts.

Key plot points include Julian sketching out the Steam Brain in his diary and securing scrap metal under fire, and Ada chalking complex algorithms on a blackboard (sometimes stepping out of reality into Julian's imagination). The climax comes when the Steam Brain is finally assembled and activated onstage during a heated battle, just as a new, grim technological innovation, a repeating rifle, makes its debut. The juxtaposition of these inventions forces the characters to question whether technology will save humanity or accelerate its destruction.

== Music and style ==
Musically, Futurity is a fusion of folk, bluegrass, and experimental rock, executed with a DIY "indie" ethos. The Lisps' score features traditional Americana instrumentation: acoustic guitar, banjo, fiddle, harmonium, alongside electric elements and unconventional percussion. Critics have noted that the songs sound simultaneously old-fashioned and futuristic, aligning with the show's dual time-period setting. Many songs are sung as male-female duets between Julian (Alvarez) and Ada (Tunis), blending their voices in close harmony.

Several critics highlighted the strong songwriting. The New York Times critic Charles Isherwood wrote that Futurity boasts "some of the most lovely and inventive music you can hear on a New York stage right now," even if the piece at times feels more like a concert than a traditional book musical. The New Yorker's preview noted the album's "humor, wit, and Americana" in its lyrics and sound. The Boston Phoenix described the music as "bouncy [and] infectious" indie folk-rock reminiscent of the Avett Brothers or Mumford & Sons. The show intentionally forgoes the polished orchestral style of Broadway musicals, favoring a raw, "anti-folk" sound with lo-fi energy. Lyrically, Alvarez's songs mix poetic imagery with Victorian scientific references. For example, one song's lyric muses about "nervous…minuscule vibrations of molecules," a line that The Boston Phoenix pointed out as evidence of the overwrought intellectualism in the lyrics. Philosophy and hope are central to the lyrical content: Futurity grapples with ideas like the cost of war, the limits of technology, and the power of human imagination.

== Critical reception ==
Upon its initial 2012 runs, Futurity drew a wide range of reactions, often polarizing critics between admiration for its creativity and reservations about its dramatic cohesion. Local Boston critics praised the bold concept and music while questioning the storytelling. The Harvard Crimson lauded Futurity as "a quirky musical triumph" with "fantastic music and innovative set design" that made it one of A.R.T.'s strongest offerings. The Boston Globe's reviewer, however, found the piece "ultimately unsatisfying" as a narrative, describing it as "ambitious, high-minded, sporadically engaging, and even captivating," but noting that it "falls short" as a fully realized musical due to its "stilted, mannered dialogue" and passive protagonist. Globe critic Don Aucoin wrote that as an experimental concert by an indie band, it succeeded, but as a theater work, it lacked momentum and emotional payoff.

The Boston Phoenix echoed some of those criticisms. While granting that the music was catchy and the performers were a "smart, cohesive acting company," the Phoenix review from Ed Siegel argued that Futurity tried to cover too much: "the Civil War, the birth of computer programming, indie rock, the dynamics of Lord Byron's family, mathematical formulas, and letters about an invention," resulting in less than the sum of its parts. Siegel singled out Alvarez's verbose lyrics as an obstacle to genuine emotion. He suggested that the show could have used more irony and less didacticism in delivering its anti-war message.

By the time of the 2015 Off-Broadway run, critical sentiment had warmed. The New York Times designated Futurity a "Critic's Pick," with Charles Isherwood praising its score and explaining that it was "refreshing to meet a musical that has too much on its mind, rather than too little." Time Out New York gave a four-star review, highlighting the show's imaginative staging and the unique sound of the band onstage. At the Lortel Awards in spring 2016, Futurity took home the top musical honor, beating several more conventional shows.

== Track listing ==
All tracks are written by César Alvarez (with the Lisps), except for Cumberland Gap, which was arranged from the traditional.

Futurity album track list
No.	Title	Length
1.	"Arkansas"	2:30
2.	"Don’t Wait"	2:39
3.	"The Meaning or the Medium"	3:03
4.	"No More War"	1:18
5.	"Cumberland Gap"	2:40
6.	"Steam Brain"	4:18
7.	"Sinner’s Land"	1:38
8.	"Made Out of Wood"	3:14
9.	"Thinking"	4:29
10.	"Blacklick Creek"	3:25
11.	"Don’t Wait (Reprise)"	1:46
12.	"Still Walking"	3:12
13.	"Ada"	4:06
14.	"How Much"	3:05
15.	"The Machine That Creates Peace"	5:20
16.	"Gravestones"	2:04
17.	"Socrates"	3:36
Total length:		52:32
