= Julia Jarcho =

American dramatist

- Born: New York City, New York, United States
- Occupations: Playwright, Director, Poet, Professor
- Writing career
- Genre: Experimental
- Notable work: Grimly Handsome (2013)
- Website: Minor Theater

Julia Jarcho is an American experimental playwright and director and professor of theater and performance studies. The NYC company Minor Theater produces and debuts her new works. She won the 2013 Obie for Best New American Play for Grimly Handsome. Chief theater critic for The New York Times Ben Brantley has called her "a queen of experimental mayhem". Jarcho is an Associate Professor and Head the MFA Playwriting Program at Brown University.

== Background ==
Jarcho grew up in New York City, where she attended Hunter College High School. She graduated from Harvard College with a degree in literature. Her senior thesis, Going on: Wittgenstein's Liveness and the Grammar of Theater, included the production of an original play, Grammar. She received her PhD from UC Berkeley's Rhetoric Department in 2013.

== Career ==
Jarcho began her career in experimental theater as a performer, acting in plays by Richard Maxwell in Downtown New York theaters such as the Ontological Theater and Soho Rep.

=== Plays ===
Nursery, written when she was a senior at Hunter College High School, was a winner of the Young Playwrights Festival National Playwriting Competition and was performed at the Cherry Lane Theater in 2001.

Her adaptation of Alfred Noyes’ poem, The Highwayman was presented at the NTUSA performance space in Brooklyn in December 2004 and published in The Best American Short Plays 2005-2006.

Delmar was staged at the Prenzlkasper theater in Berlin, Germany, in October 2005. Jarcho later collaborated with visual artist, Meredith James, who adapted the play as a video installation at the Jack Hanley Gallery.

As a member of the playwrights' collective, 13P, Jarcho's American Treasure was staged at Paradise Factory Theatre in November 2009. The New York Times called the play, "an odd, dense, oblique but haunting work" and noted that Jarcho is "a remarkably clever, bewitching writer and a master of stylized behavior."

Grimly Handsome premiered at the Incubator Arts Project in January 2013 as part of the Other Forces Festival and won the Obie for Best New American Play that year. In January 2015 it was remounted at JACK in Brooklyn.

Other productions by Jarcho include: Dreamless Land which premiered with New York City Players at the Abrons Arts Center in November 2011; Nomads, directed by Alice Reagan, was the final play performed at the Incubator Arts Project in June 2014; Every Angel is Brutal, directed by Knud Adams, was part of Clubbed Thumb's Summerworks 2016 lineup and staged at the Wild Project.

Her most recent play, The Terrifying, premiered at the Abrons Arts Center in March 2017.

=== Style ===
The playwright Mac Wellman described Jarcho's work as a writer and director as “Menippean satire...dealing with the whole analysis of what theater is.”

Structurally, Jarcho's plays have employed unconventional storytelling techniques—what the New Yorker and others have called, "non-linear," and Time Out New York and New York Theatre Review have referred to as "shifting" narratives. Actors in Jarcho's productions often perform multiple roles to engage audiences in questions of coherent selfhood and stable identity.

== Works ==
=== As playwright and director ===
- Pathetic (Minor Theater, June 2019)
- The Terrifying (Minor Theater, March–April 2017)
- Grimly Handsome (Incubator Arts Project, January 2013 and JACK, January 2015)
- Dreamless Land (New York City Players, November 2011)
- American Treasure (13P, New York, November 2009 and Bay Area Playwrights Festival, May 2009)
- Aria Da Capo (Target Margin, New York, June 2009)
- All I Do Is Dream Of You (Festival 100º/Sophiensaele, Berlin, February 2006)
- The Highwayman (NTUSA performance space, New York, December 2004)

=== As playwright ===
- Every Angel is Brutal, directed by Knud Adams (Clubbed Thumb, May 2016)
- Nomads, directed by Alice Reagan (Incubator Arts Project, May/June 2014)
- A Small Hole, directed by Alice Reagan (Performance Lab 115, NYC Fringe Festival, August 2006)
- Nursery, directed by Brett W. Reynolds (Young Playwrights Festival/Cherry Lane Theater, New York, Fall 2001; directed by Mark Ravenhill at UC Davis, Fall 2005)

== Awards and honors ==
Jarcho is the recipient of the Mark O’Donnell Prize, a Doris Duke Impact Award, an Obie for Best New American Play, a Berrilla Kerr Award for Excellence in Playwriting, and a Sarah Verdone Writing Award. She has been a resident at the Eugene O’Neill Playwrights Conference, the Playwrights Foundation, the Macdowell Colony, and SPACE at Ryder Farm.

== Teaching and research ==
Jarcho is an Associate Professor and Head the MFA Playwriting Program at Brown University.

She previously taught in the Dramatic Literature department at New York University.

Her first academic book is Writing and the Modern Stage: Theater Beyond Drama (2017).

== Publications ==
- Nursery in Rush Hour II: Bad Boys ISBN 0-38-573033-0
- The Highwayman in The Best American Short Plays 2005-2006 ISBN 978-1-557-83713-4
- American Treasure in 13P: The Complete Plays in libraries (WorldCat catalog)
- Minor Theater: Three Plays ISBN 0-98-973936-8
- Writing and the Modern Stage: Theater Beyond Drama ISBN 978-1-107-13235-1
- Grimly Handsome ISBN 978-1-350-06636-6
