= Anna K. Jacobs =

Australian composer, lyricist and book writer

Anna K. Jacobs is an Australian composer, lyricist, and book writer living in Brooklyn, NY. She is best known for composing the music and co-writing the book for the musical Teeth.

== Career ==
Jacobs made her professional American theatrical debut in 2009 with POP! at the Yale Repertory Theatre, which received the 2010 Connecticut Critics Circle Award for Outstanding Production of a Musical. The musical, a collaboration with book writer and lyricist Maggie-Kate Coleman, was first developed by the pair as a student thesis project when they attended NYU's Graduate Musical Theatre Writing Program. It went on to receive productions at Studio Theatre in D.C. and City Theatre in Pittsburgh, the latter of which starred Anthony Rapp as Andy Warhol.

In 2012, Diversionary Theatre in San Diego produced the world premiere of Jacobs' musical Harmony, Kansas, with book and lyrics by Bill Nelson. The production received three Craig Noel Award nominations for Outstanding New Musical, Outstanding New Score, and Outstanding Direction of a Musical.

Jacobs was commissioned by George Street Playhouse to write the music and lyrics for Anytown, a musical developed in collaboration with book writer Jim Jack for the company's Educational Touring Theatre in response to the impact that prescription opioid misuse, heroin and fentanyl has had on communities throughout New Jersey. Anytown premiered at the Spotlight Conference on Opioid Abuse at George Street Playhouse in 2018.

Alongside composers and lyricists Jordan Beck, Carmel Dean, Mindi Dickstein, Matt Gould, Adam Gwon, and Gerald Sternbach, Jacobs wrote songs for the musical, Witnesses, which was conceived by Beck and featured a book by Robert L. Freedman. The musical premiered at California Center for the Arts, Escondido in 2022 and was awarded two Craig Noel Awards for Outstanding New Production and Outstanding Direction of a Musical.

In collaboration with Michael R. Jackson, Jacobs composed the music and co-wrote the book for Teeth, which premiered off-Broadway at Playwrights Horizons in the spring of 2024 with direction by Sarah Benson and choreography by Raja Feather Kelly. Jacobs received Drama Desk, Outer Critics Circle, Drama League, and Lucille Lortel Award nominations. She began working with Jackson on the musical in 2009, when he brought the idea to her. On July 12, 2024 a cast album was released, and dates for an open-ended commercial Off-Broadway run at New World Stages were announced, with opening night set for October 31, 2024.

From 2018 to 2023, Jacobs was the Director of New York Youth Symphony Musical Theater Songwriting Program.

== Honors ==
Jacobs received a 2020 Jonathan Larson Grant, the 2018 Eric Salzman Award for New Music Theater, and the 2016 Billie Burke Ziegfeld Award.

For Teeth, Jacobs received Drama Desk Award nominations for Outstanding Musical and Outstanding Book of a Musical, a Drama League nomination for Outstanding Production of a Musical, a Lucille Lortel Award nomination for Outstanding Musical, and Outer Critics Circle nominations for Outstanding New Off-Broadway Musical and Outstanding Book of a Musical.

Jacobs was a 2016 Sundance Institute Theatre Lab Fellow and a 2010-11 Dramatists Guild Fellow.

== Musicals ==
- Stella and the Moon Man (2005)
- POP! (2009)
- Harmony, Kansas (2012)
- Anytown (2018)
- Witnesses (2022)
- The Real Gemma Jordan (movie musical; 2022)
- Teeth (2024)

== Personal life ==
Jacobs is of Lebanese and Jewish descent. She studied at the University of Sydney, Indiana University, and New York University.
