= Fairview (play) =

2018 comedy play written by Jackie Sibblies Drury

- Written by: Jackie Sibblies Drury
- Original language: English

Premiere
- Date premiered: June 17, 2018
- Place premiered: Soho Repertory Theatre

Fairview is a 2018 comedy play written by Jackie Sibblies Drury. The play was co-commissioned by Berkeley Rep and Soho Repertory Theatre. The play follows a middle class African-American family as they prepare for a birthday dinner for their grandmother only to be watched by four white people.

== Plot ==
=== Act One ===
The play begins with an African American woman, Beverly, setting up a birthday party for her mother in an upper-middle class house. Her family slowly joins her onstage, including her husband Dayton, her sister Jasmine, and her daughter Keisha. Beverly receives a phone call from her brother, Tyrone, telling her that he cannot come to the birthday party. Beverly becomes so upset with things going crazy and family conflict that occurs that she faints.

=== Act Two ===
Act two has the Black actors mimic the same actions on the set from act one as a group of white characters commentate on race. Two of the white people, Jimbo and Mack, discuss which race they would be if they were not white and are challenged by a third white character, Suze. Bets, another white woman, questions the concept of race. Suze, who was raised by a Black woman, says that she would choose to be African-American because she holds a lot of empathy for them. As the white characters begin to argue, Beverly faints in the background action. The white characters continue their conversation as the audience sees the Black characters engage in action that continues where act one left off. As the act ends, the white characters disappear.

=== Act Three ===
The actions of the Black characters are continued in act three as Beverly’s mother enters the scene, played by the same white woman who played Suze in act two. Keisha is notably uncomfortable as her grandmother is played by a white woman. Tyrone then appears, played by the same white actor who played Jimbo. The white actor who played Mack appears as Erika. A second, jazzier version of the grandmother appears, played by the same white actress who played Bets. While all of the white actors enter the play as Black characters, Keisha becomes more and more uncomfortable as white people are trying to fit into Black misfortune. The play ends with Keisha breaking the fourth wall and speaking to the audience about how Black people need to tell their own stories and how white people need to participate as listeners, encouraging the white members of the audience to switch places with the Black actors onstage.

== Production ==
The play premiered Off-Broadway at Soho Repertory Theatre, running from June 17, 2018 through August 12, 2018. The play was produced at Berkeley Repertory Theatre, Berkeley, California in October and November 2018, again directed by Sarah Benson (the Artistic Director of Soho Rep) and choreographed by Raja Feather Kelly.

The play was produced at Polonsky Shakespeare Center, Brooklyn, New York by Theatre for a New Audience starting on June 2, 2019, directed by Sarah Benson and choreographed by Raja Feather Kelly. The play's run was extended from June 30 to July 28.

The play was produced in London at the Young Vic from November 28, 2019 to January 18, 2020. The production was directed by Nadia Latif.

== Awards and honors ==
In April 2019, Fairview won the 2019 Pulitzer Prize for Drama. The Pulitzer committee called the play "a hard-hitting drama that examines race in a highly conceptual, layered structure, ultimately bringing audiences into the actors' community to face deep-seated prejudices."

The play was nominated for the 2019 Drama Desk Awards: Outstanding Play; Outstanding Featured Actor in a Play (Charles Browning), Outstanding Director of a Play (Sarah Benson), Outstanding Set Design of a Play (Mimi Lien), Outstanding Lighting Design for a Play (Amith Chandrashaker) and Outstanding Sound Design in a Play (Mikaal Sulaiman).

== See also ==
- Get Out – 2017 film by Jordan Peele with a similar content.
