= PEN/Laura Pels Theater Award =

PEN/Laura Pels International Foundation for Theater Award
- Description: Recognition for excellence in American theater and playwrighting
- Country: United States
- Presented by: PEN America
- Website: pen.org/pen-laura-pels-international-foundation-for-theater-award/

The PEN/Laura Pels International Foundation for Theater Award, commonly referred to as the PEN/Laura Pels Theater Award, is awarded by the PEN America (formerly PEN American Center). It annually recognizes two American playwrights. A medal is given to a designated "grand master" American dramatist, in recognition of their work, and a stipend of $7,500 (in 2005) is presented to a "new voice", an American playwright whose literary and artistic merit is evident in their plays.

"Two playwrights are selected for the following honors: a specially commissioned art object will be presented to a master American dramatist, in recognition of his or her body of work; and a cash prize of $7,500 will be awarded to an American playwright in mid-career, whose literary achievements are vividly apparent in the rich and striking language of his or her work. In both cases, PEN/Laura Pels International Foundation for Theater honorees are writers working indisputably at the highest level of achievement. The awards were developed to reflect Laura Pels’s dedication to supporting excellence in American theatre as well as PEN’s commitment to recognizing and rewarding the playwright's literary accomplishment."

The Master American Dramatist Award is not open to nominations but is chosen by the judges panel. The Mid-Career Award is open to peer nominations (i.e., not by the playwrights themselves), but the playwrights must meet certain criteria: they must be American and write in English; they can be from regional theaters as long as they have had two full-length productions mounted under either open- or limited-run contracts and in theaters with at least 299 seats. Specifically excluded are playwrights who write one-acts, musical-books, or translations.

The award is one of many PEN awards sponsored by International PEN affiliates in over 145 PEN centers around the world. The PEN American Center awards have been characterized as being among the "major" American literary prizes.

== Award winners ==
PEN/Laura Pels Theater Award winners
| Year | Category | Playwright | Ref. |
|---|---|---|---|
| 1998 | American Playwright in Mid-Career | Richard Greenberg | |
| 1998 | Master American Dramatist | Arthur Miller | |
| 1999 | American Playwright in Mid-Career | Paula Vogel | |
| 1999 | Master American Dramatist | Edward Albee | |
| 2000 | American Playwright in Mid-Career | Suzan-Lori Parks | |
| 2000 | Master American Dramatist | Horton Foote | |
| 2001 | American Playwright in Mid-Career | Charles L. Mee | |
| 2001 | Master American Dramatist | Richard Foreman | |
| 2002 | American Playwright in Mid-Career | Tony Kushner | |
| 2002 | Master American Dramatist | María Irene Fornés | |
| 2003 | American Playwright in Mid-Career | Craig Lucas | |
| 2003 | Master American Dramatist | John Guare | |
| 2004 | American Playwright in Mid-Career | Lynn Nottage | |
| 2004 | Master American Dramatist | Lanford Wilson | |
| 2005 | American Playwright in Mid-Career | Dael Orlandersmith | |
| 2005 | Master American Dramatist | Wallace Shawn | |
| 2006 | American Playwright in Mid-Career | Stephen Adly Guirgis | |
| 2006 | Master American Dramatist | Adrienne Kennedy | |
| 2007 | American Playwright in Mid-Career | Naomi Iizuka | |
| 2007 | Master American Dramatist | A. R. Gurney | |
| 2008 | American Playwright in Mid-Career | Sarah Ruhl | |
| 2008 | Master American Dramatist | Richard Nelson | |
| 2009 | American Playwright in Mid-Career | Nilo Cruz | |
| 2009 | Master American Dramatist | Sam Shepard | |
| 2010 | American Playwright in Mid-Career | Theresa Rebeck | |
| 2010 | Master American Dramatist | David Mamet | |
| 2011 | American Playwright in Mid-Career | Marcus Gardley | |
| 2011 | Master American Dramatist | David Henry Hwang | |
| 2012 | American Playwright in Mid-Career | Will Eno | |
| 2012 | American Playwright in Mid-Career | Adam Rapp | |
| 2012 | Master American Dramatist | Christopher Durang | |
| 2013 | American Playwright in Mid-Career | Kirsten Greenidge | |
| 2013 | Master American Dramatist | Larry Kramer | |
| 2014 | American Playwright in Mid-Career | Donald Margulies | |
| 2014 | Emerging American Playwright | Laura Marks | |
| 2014 | Master American Dramatist | David Rabe | |
| 2015 | American Playwright in Mid-Career | Anne Washburn | |
| 2015 | Emerging American Playwright | Jennifer Blackmer | |
| 2015 | Master American Dramatist | Tina Howe | |
| 2016 | American Playwright in Mid-Career | Young Jean Lee | |
| 2016 | Emerging American Playwright | Branden Jacobs-Jenkins | |
| 2016 | Master American Dramatist | Lynn Nottage | |
| 2017 | American Playwright in Mid-Career | Tarell Alvin McCraney | |
| 2017 | Emerging American Playwright | Thomas Bradshaw | |
| 2017 | Master American Dramatist | Suzan-Lori Parks | |
| 2018 | American Playwright in Mid-Career | Sibyl Kempson | |
| 2018 | Emerging American Playwright | Mike Lew | |
| 2018 | Master American Dramatist | Luis Alfaro | |
| 2019 | American Playwright in Mid-Career | Larissa FastHorse | |
| 2020 | American Playwright in Mid-Career | Tanya Barfield | |
| 2021 | American Playwright in Mid-Career | Daniel Alexander Jones | |
| 2022 | American Playwright in Mid-Career | Jackie Sibblies Drury | |
| 2023 | | Erika Dickerson-Despenza | |
| 2024 | | Guadalís Del Carmen | |
| 2025 | | Mona Mansour | |
