= Thomas Bradshaw (playwright) =

American playwright

Thomas Bradshaw is an American playwright whose work has been extensively reviewed. He is the recipient of PEN/Laura Pels International Foundation for Theater Award as the Emerging American Playwright and of the Foundation for Contemporary Arts Grants to Artists award (2012). Bradshaw has been commissioned or been produced by companies including The Flea Theater, Goodman Theatre, Soho Rep, and translated into German for Theater Bielefeld. Several collections of Bradshaw's plays have been published by Theatre Communications Group.

As an actor, Bradshaw has performed in Groundwork of the Metaphysic of Morals and Pullman, WA, two early plays by Young Jean Lee.

== Plays ==
- The Seagull/Woodstock, NY (2023) - An adaptation of Anton Chekhov's The Seagull.
- Thomas & Sally (2017)
- Fulfillment (2015)
- Intimacy (2014)
- Job (2012)
- Burning (2011)
- Mary (2011)
- The Bereaved (2009)
- Southern Promises (2008)
- Purity (2007)
- Prophet (2005)

== Reactions ==
Bradshaw's work Thomas & Sally was met with protests because the play debates whether Thomas Jefferson and Sally Hemings could have been in love. Protestors argue that there is no room for debate because Hemings was Jefferson's slave.
