= The Lisps =

American indie rock band

- Origin: Brooklyn, New York, United States
- Genres: Indie Rock
- Years active: 2005–2015
- Label: Extropian Records
- Members: César Alvarez, Eric Farber, Sammy Tunis, Lorenzo Wolff
- Website: The Lisps on YouTube

The Lisps was an American, New York-based indie rock band. The group formed in The South Bronx in 2005 fronted by César Alvarez and Sammy Tunis. The band consists of four members playing guitars, melodicas, found percussion, drum set, and male/female vocals. The music combines elements of Folk and Vaudeville with Western pop music.

In 2008 The Lisps wrote a Civil War and science fiction themed musical entitled Futurity which has been performed in workshop versions at The Zipper Factory, Joe's Pub and HERE in New York City. Futurity world premiered as part of the American Repertory Theater's 2011-12 season under the direction of Sarah Benson. Walker Art Center has co-commissioned the project. Broadway actor Michael Cerveris has performed with The Lisps in several of the workshop productions of Futurity and in concert.

The Lisps composed the music for The Foundry Theatre's 2013 production of Bertolt Brecht's "The Good Person of Szechwan", which starred Taylor Mac.

The Lisps released their debut EP, The Vain, The Modest and The Dead, in 2006. In 2008 they self-released their debut album, Country Doctor Museum. In May 2011 they released their third album, Are We at the Movies? In October 2012, The Lisps released their fourth album, Futurity.

== Discography ==
- The Vain, The Modest and The Dead (self-released 2006)
- Country Doctor Museum (self-released 2008)
- Are We at the Movies? (Extropian Records 2011)
- Futurity (Extropian Records 2012)
