= Teeth (musical) =

Musical by Michael R. Jackson and Anna K. Jacobs

- Poster for the 2024 Playwrights Horizons production
- Music: Anna K. Jacobs
- Lyrics: Michael R. Jackson
- Book: Anna K. Jacobs; Michael R. Jackson
- Basis: Teeth by Mitchell Lichtenstein
- Premiere: March 19, 2024: Playwrights Horizons, New York City
- Productions: 2024 Playwrights Horizons; 2024 New World Stages

Teeth is a musical by Michael R. Jackson and Anna K. Jacobs, adapted from the 2007 horror film of the same name. It premiered off-Broadway in 2024 at Playwrights Horizons.

The musical follows Dawn O'Keefe, an evangelical teenager, who is navigating the challenges of adolescent dating and chastity when she discovers she has teeth in her vagina.

== Plot ==
"Pastor", the leader of a congregation in the town of Eden, leads a sermon preaching against premarital sex, following the recent case of teenage pregnancy involving Amy Sue and her boyfriend Brock. His stepdaughter, Dawn O'Keefe, leads the "Promise Keeper Girls" in reiterating their abstinence pledge, insisting that their vaginas are "a precious gift" that must be protected until marriage ("Precious Gift"). Her stepbrother, Brad, rejects both Pastor and Dawn's attempts to get him more involved in the church. He joins the Truthseekers, a virtual group of men's rights activists led by the mysterious "Godfather", and tells of an incident between him and Dawn when they were young in which he fingered her and received a cut ("Between Her Thighs"). Dawn meets with her boyfriend, Tobey, and the pair express their love for each other, with the latter claiming he loves her most for her modesty ("Modest is Hottest"). However, Dawn struggles with her temptation to break her chastity vow, as she has been taught since birth to consider her sexual urges evil ("Shame in My Body").

Pastor catches Brad masturbating upon the instructions of Godfather and beats him ("A Real Man"). Tobey meets with Dawn and reveals he is not actually a virgin as he previously had sexual intercourse with his girlfriend Denise at his previous school. Dawn, intrigued by the idea that Tobey has had sexual experiences, encourages him to share a fantasy he has of her and the two nearly consummate their relationship ("Playing With Fire"), but they are interrupted by fellow congregation member Ryan. Dawn summons the Promise Keeper Girls, who shame her, but she is defended by Ryan. The girls try to criticize Ryan as well due to him being gay: Ryan freely admits to this but claims despite his sins he is able to be born again, and they too can be forgiven for straying from the path ("Born Again"). The congregation decides to have Pastor re-baptize them in the morning. Dawn goes to Tobey to tell him of these plans, but he claims he cannot wait: they go into a lake and perform the baptism ritual themselves, before Tobey proposes to her and, in the rush of emotions, begin having sex ("When She Gave Birth"). However, Tobey starts becoming aggressive and ignores Dawn's pleas to stop. Dawn's vagina abruptly cuts off Tobey's penis and leaves him, dead, floating in the lake. Unbeknownst to Dawn, Brad witnessed everything.

The other Promise Keeper Girls have a vision of a mysterious female god, which they sense has been awakened in a vessel near to them. After Tobey's body is found, Pastor gathers the Promise Keeper Girls at the church, claiming an evil has awakened and sets off to find Dawn. The girls feel changes in their body as they sense whatever has awakened takes the form of teeth, while Brad leads the Truthseekers in believing the fall of man is upon them ("Teeth"). Ryan finds Dawn at her house while Brad and Pastor are out, and after learning what happened recommends she see a gynecologist outside of town. Dawn thinks back to her teachings and decides she, along with her late mother Kim, were punished simply for being women ("Always the Woman"). Brad confronts Dawn and tries to remind her of the incident from their childhood, but is stopped by Pastor. Before Brad leaves, he crudely tells Dawn that Pastor never had sexual intercourse with Kim — Pastor freely confesses to this, saying that Kim was "impure" because of her past ("Shame in My Body (reprise)"). Dawn elects to visit the gynecologist, Dr. Godfrey, who is initially sympathetic but reveals predatory tendencies during his examination ("Girls Like You") that result in Dawn cutting off his hand with her "teeth", causing him to bleed to death, but not before identifying her condition as vagina dentata. Dawn runs to Ryan, revealing she now remembers the incident with Brad and realizes she has had the "teeth" since birth. Ryan searches on the dark web for information on "vagina dentata". He, along with Brad and the Truthseekers, find a wiki revealing information on Dentata, an ancient goddess with teeth in her vagina. They realize that Dawn has become a vessel for Dentata, and supposedly the only way to defeat her is for a hero to have sex with her and cure her ("According to the Wiki"). Ryan reveals this to Dawn and offers to have sex with her, suggesting it will cure her of her dentition and him of his homosexuality ("I'm Your Guy"). The two have consensual sex and Dawn's "teeth" do not engage, but Ryan reveals he was secretly live-streaming the encounter to prove to the world he is no longer gay.

The trauma of her experiences finally causes Dawn to snap ("When She Gave Birth (Reprise)"), as she fully embraces the goddess Dentata's possession and seduces Ryan into having sex again before cutting off his penis. She leads the Promise Keeper Girls, now worshipers of Dentata and having grown their own "teeth", in attacking Pastor as revenge for his teachings, emasculating him. Brad declares himself the hero of the Truthseekers and that he will defeat Dawn, before killing Pastor by setting him on fire. He leads the Truthseekers in trying to fight "the feminocracy" but they all get their penises cut off by the Promise Keeper Girls ("Dentata"). Dawn and Brad face off in a final showdown, accusing each other of being their "monster" and the source of their pain before engaging in ritualistic sex ("Take Me Down (Part 1)") but Dawn emerges victorious, cutting off Brad's penis. Having taken over Eden, the Dentata worshipers promise to take over the rest of the Bible Belt and the rest of the world, threatening the audience to beware of their "teeth" ("Take Me Down (Part 2)").

== Cast and characters ==
Character	Playwrights Horizons	New World Stages
Character	2024	
Dawn O'Keefe	Alyse Alan Louis	Alyse Alan Louis
Pastor Bill O'Keefe	Steven Pasquale	Andy Karl
Brad/Truthseeker	Will Connolly	Will Connolly
Tobey/Truthseeker	Jason Gotay	Jason Gotay
Ryan/Truthseeker	Jared Loftin	Jared Loftin
Promise Keeper Girl Keke	Helen J Shen	Madison McBride
Promise Keeper Girl Rachel	Lexi Rhoades	Micaela Lamas
Promise Keeper Girl Stephanie	Wren Rivera	Wren Rivera
Promise Keeper Girl Becky	Courtney Bassett	Courtney Bassett
Promise Keeper Girl Fiona	Phoenix Best	Sydney Parra
Promise Keeper Girl Trisha	Jenna Rose Husli	Jenna Rose Husli

== Musical numbers ==
- "Precious Gift" – Dawn, Promise Keeper Girls
- "Between Her Thighs" – Brad, Truthseekers
- "Modest is Hottest" – Tobey, Dawn, Promise Keeper Girls
- "Shame in My Body" – Dawn, Promise Keeper Girls
- "A Real Man" – Pastor, Brad
- "Playing With Fire" – Tobey, Dawn, Promise Keeper Girls
- "Born Again" – Ryan, Dawn, Promise Keeper Girls
- "When She Gave Birth" – Promise Keeper Girls
- "Teeth" – Promise Keeper Girls, Pastor, Brad, Truthseekers
- "Always the Woman" – Dawn, Promise Keeper Girls
- "Shame in My Body (Reprise)" † – Dawn
- "Girls Like You" – Dr. Godfrey, Dawn, Promise Keeper Girls
- "According to the Wiki" – Ryan, Brad, Truthseekers
- "I'm Your Guy" – Ryan, Dawn
- "When She Gave Birth (Reprise)" † – Promise Keeper Girls
- "Dentata" – Dentata, Hero, Promise Keeper Girls
- "Take Me Down (Part 1)" – Company
- "Take Me Down (Part 2)" – Company

† Not included on the original cast recording

== Adaptation ==
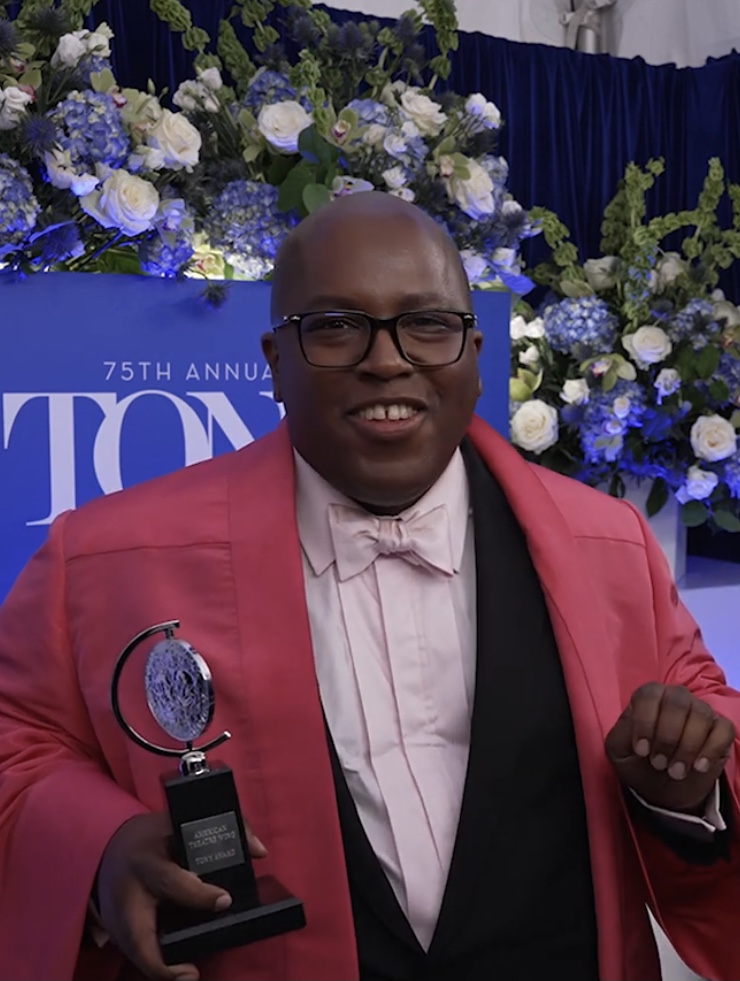
Writer Michael R. Jackson won the Tony Award for Best Book of a Musical for his previous project, A Strange Loop

Though based on the 2007 film Teeth, the musical makes some adjustments to the characters, combining the roles of pastor and Dawn's stepfather, significantly altering the character of Ryan, and originating characters of the Promise Keeper Girls. The musical also originates Brad's incel storyline.

Jacobs' score ranges from Christian rock to what she described as "an ancient feminine Tori Amos meets Stravinsky pagan ritual music."

== Productions ==
Versions of the show were workshopped at the Sundance Institute, Playwrights Horizons, Ars Nova, and 54 Below.

The off-Broadway run entered previews at Playwrights Horizons on February 21, 2024, opening March 19 after a weeklong delay due to cast illness. It was twice extended and closed April 28. Sarah Benson directed and Raja Feather Kelly choreographed.

An Off-Broadway commercial, open-ended transfer of the Playwrights Horizons production began preview performances at New World Stages on October 16, 2024, and officially opened on October 31. The production closed on January 5, 2025.

The original Off-Broadway cast recording was released digitally on July 12, 2024, with the physical release set for August 30.

== Reception ==
The New York Times theater critic Jesse Green praised Jacobs' and Jackson's "catchy pop-rock tunes with their smart, smutty rhymes," but suggested the musical's plot is contrived to fit the frame of its satirical message. A Times feature on the show by journalist Erik Piepenburg called it a "feminist awakening with a lethal bite." Vulture's Sara Holdren commended the musical's use of the horror genre, juxtaposing the "fantastical" gruesomeness of the on-stage violence with the frightening realism of the ideas that underpin them. For The Washington Post, Brittani Samuel lamented the power that men hold in defining Dawn's character, commenting that, "While it's all raucous, campy fun, one can’t help but crave more for our protagonist."

The musical received four Drama Desk Award nominations in 2024, specifically Outstanding Musical, Outstanding Lyrics, Outstanding Book, and Outstanding Featured Actor for Steven Pasquale. It also received four Outer Critics Circle Award nominations the same year, including Outstanding New Off-Broadway Musical.
