= A Public Reading of an Unproduced Screenplay About the Death of Walt Disney =

2013 play about Walt Disney

- Promotional art from 2013 off-Broadway premiere
- Written by: Lucas Hnath
- Subject: Walt Disney

Premiere
- Date: April 30, 2013
- Place: Soho Repertory Theatre

A Public Reading of an Unproduced Screenplay About the Death of Walt Disney is a 2013 play by Lucas Hnath.

== Synopsis ==
The show is in the form of a screenplay written and performed by Walt Disney about himself and his death. It's about his last days on earth and a city he's going to build that's going to change the world.

== Production history ==
A series of workshops directed by Jyana Browne supported the initial creation of the play, which starred Ryan Bronz, Andrew Grutsetskie, Mike Mihm, and Amy Staats.

The play premiered off-Broadway at the Soho Repertory Theatre on April 30, 2013, and closed on June 9, 2013. It was directed by Sarah Benson and produced by Caleb Hammons. The set designer was Mimi Lien, the costume designer was Kaye Voyce, the lighting designer was Matt Frey, and the sound designer was Matt Tierney. Choreography was by Annie-B Parson and special effects were by Steve Culffo.

In the original off-Broadway cast, Walt Disney was played by Larry Pine, his brother Roy was played by Frank Wood, his daughter was played by Amanda Quaid, and his son-in-law, Ron, was played by Brian Sgambati.

The Wilbury Theatre Group produced the New England premiere of the play in November 2014. The production was directed by Brien Lang. The play was produced by MKA Theatre in Australia in 2018. The production was directed by Tobias Manderson-Galvin and starred a real-life family. In 2021, a Philadelphia production of the play was put on by the Actor's Playground at the Philadelphia Ethical Society. Working Barn Productions put on the west coast premiere of the play at the Odyssey Theatre in Los Angeles, California in March 2022. Christopher Eccleston and Joe Caffrey starred in a single performance for Live Theatre Company in November 2026.

A Public Reading of an Unproduced Screenplay About the Death of Walt Disney is licensed by Concord Theatricals.
