= César Alvarez =

American composer, lyricist and playwright

- Born: 1980 (age 45–46); Greensboro, North Carolina, U.S.
- Education: Interlochen Arts Academy; Oberlin Conservatory; Bard College (MFA)
- Occupations: Composer, lyricist, playwright, professor
- Employer: Dartmouth College
- Known for: Futurity (musical), The Lisps
- Notable work: Futurity, The Elementary Spacetime Show, The Universe is a Small Hat, Noise
- Awards: Lucille Lortel Award for Outstanding Musical (2016)

César Alvarez (born 1980) is an American composer, lyricist and playwright. César is best known for the musical Futurity which they wrote with their band The Lisps. Futurity won the Lucille Lortel Award for Outstanding Musical in 2016.

Alvarez is an assistant professor of music at Dartmouth College.

== Early life ==
César J. Alvarez was born to a Cuban father and a Euro-American mother in Greensboro, NC. They were named for César Cauce and James Waller, who were both victims of the Greensboro Massacre.

Alvarez attended Interlochen Arts Academy and Oberlin Conservatory. They received an MFA from Bard College.

Alvarez uses they/them pronouns

== Career ==
Alvarez spent the early years of their career performing with The Lisps. The Lisps released 4 albums between 2006 and 2012."

In 2008, Alvarez conceived of the Civil War-era science fictional musical Futurity as their master's thesis at Bard. In 2009, The Lisps first performed Futurity at the now defunct New York City venue, The Zipper Factory. Futurity world premiered as part of the American Repertory Theater's 2011/12 season under the direction of Sarah Benson co-commissioned by Walker Art Center. Futurity went on to an Off-Broadway premiere co-produced by Soho Rep and Ars Nova in 2015. That production won the Lucille Lortel Award for Outstanding Musical and received four other Lortel nominations.

In 2013 Alvarez composed original music with The Lisps for The Foundry Theater's production of Bertolt Brecht's The Good Person of Szechwan starring Taylor Mac. Alvarez and The Lisps received a Drama Desk Nomination for Outstanding Music in a Play.

In 2014 Alvarez composed original music for the World Premiere production of Branden Jacobs-Jenkins's play An Octoroon. They received another Drama Desk Nomination for Outstanding Music in a Play.

Alvarez also composed music for Soho Rep's site specific work Washeteria, Theatre for a New Audience's production of Thornton Wilder's The Skin of Our Teeth, and the documentary A Woman Like Me.

Alvarez's other musicals include The Universe is a Small Hat, The Elementary Spacetime Show and Noise.

Alvarez was an artist-in-residence at The University of the Arts where they served as Founding Artistic Director of Polyphone, a festival of new musicals for five years.

In June of 2026, their musical The Potluck debuted at Soho Repertory Theatre, running June 30 - July 26, directed by Sarah Benson.

== Theater works ==
- Futurity (2012)
- The Elementary Spacetime Show (2014)
- The Universe is a Small Hat (2015)
- Noise (2017)
- egg (2022)
- The Potluck (2026)
- Painting Mary

== Awards ==
- 2016 Lucille Lortel Award for Outstanding Musical (Futurity)
- 2016 Jonathan Larson Award recipient
- 2016 Off-Broadway Alliance Award for Best New Musical (Futurity)
- 2022 Kleban Prize in Musical Theater
- 2022 Guggenheim Fellowship recipient for Drama & Performance Art
