= We Are Proud to Present... =

2012 play about the Herero and Nama genocide

We Are Proud to Present a Presentation About the Herero of Namibia, Formerly Known as Southwest Africa, From the German Südwestafrika, Between the Years 1884–1915
- Original language: English
- Written by: Jackie Sibblies Drury
- Genre: Drama, comedy

Premiere
- Date: 2012

We Are Proud to Present a Presentation About the Herero of Namibia, Formerly Known as Southwest Africa, From the German Südwestafrika, Between the Years 1884–1915 (sometimes shortened as We Are Proud to Present...) is a 2012 comedy/drama play by the American playwright Jackie Sibblies Drury.

== Plot ==
The play is a comedic dramatization of the largely forgotten Herero and Nama genocide which took place in Namibia between 1904 and 1907 when the region was a German colony, after Germany confiscated tribal lands and the Herero people rebelled. The retribution over four years by German soldiers resulted in more than 65,000 deaths. The play deals with the enormity of this story by introducing it through the actors of a "presentation" which is intended to tell the story, and shows how the various players respond to the gruesome facts during first rehearsal.

== Themes ==
The play reflects ethical debates in the theatre about representation, as the actors in the presentation use a series of improvisations during their rehearsal to explore personal relationships to the loss of culture experienced by the Herero as a consequence of the genocide. An undercurrent of the race issues of contemporary America is present in this rehearsal as the actors, three black and three white Americans struggle to retain a sense of polite political correctness while trying to humanize both the Herero and the German colonizers.

The play also explores the capacity of humans to casually inflict suffering on one another, and as the exploration of German brutality through theatre spirals off the rails, the actors get carried away in the scene and the violence becomes scary. The play asks the audience to consider how the art and theatre we consume is produced, and how the relationships of the people involved can suffer during an intense creative process.

== Performances and reception ==
The play was read at the Victory Gardens Theater in Chicago in August 2010 as part of their Ignition Festival of New Plays and received its world premiere at Victory Gardens in April 2012. It was later performed at the Off-Off-Broadway Soho Repertory Theatre in New York from November 7 to December 16, 2012. Its European premiere was at the Bush Theater in London between February 28 and April 12, 2014. Other performances have included The Matrix Theatre Company in Los Angeles where the cast was nominated for an Ovation Award in 2013, in Washington, DC, and in Boston.

The play received mixed reviews, mainly because of its attempted reach. Said one critic, "[The play] falters a bit in its cathartic stretch, but the work accomplishes something signally important: In recalling a traumatic chapter of African history, it magnifies the biases and conflicts that are inextricably part of the act of remembrance itself."
