= Erika Dickerson-Despenza =

American playwright

- Born: Chicago, Illinois
- Education: University of Wisconsin–Madison
- Occupation: Playwright
- Writing career
- Notable awards: Susan Smith Blackburn Prize 2021; PEN/Laura Pels Theater Award 2023

Erika Dickerson-Despenza is an American playwright. She won the Susan Smith Blackburn Prize in 2021 for her play, cullud wattah.

== Early life and education ==
Originally from Chicago, Illinois, Dickerson-Despenza graduated from the University of Wisconsin–Madison in 2014 with a bachelor's degree in English education from the School of Education. While at UW–Madison, she started a theater company, The For Colored Girls Project.

== Career ==
After graduating, Dickerson-Despenza took on teaching jobs. She moved to New York and took a position with People's Theatre Project. In 2019, Dickerson-Despenza quit her non-theatre job to pursue playwriting full time. She was The Public Theater's 2019-2020 Tow Foundation playwright-in-residence.

Dickerson-Despenza's play, cullud wattah, received its first staged reading at Jackalope Theatre in Chicago in 2018. The play follows three generations of Black women living through the Flint, Michigan water crisis. It was featured on the 2019 Kilroys' List, as was Dickerson-Despenza's play, [hieroglyph]. The Public Theatre had slated cullud wattah to be staged in the summer of 2020, which would have been Dickerson-Despenza's first professional production. However, the production was postponed due to the COVID-19 pandemic. Despite the suspension of all performances of the play, cullud wattah won the 2021 Susan Smith Blackburn Prize. cullud wattah opened at The Public Theatre in NYC in November 2021, under the direction of Candis C. Jones.

Dickerson-Despenza's play, shadow/land received a podcast production in 2021 with The Public Theatre. shadow/land is the first installment of a 10-play cycle about the effects of Hurricane Katrina. The second installment, [hieroglyph], was co-produced by The San Francisco Playhouse and Lorraine Hansberry Theatre in 2021 for a digital production.

Dickerson-Despenza pulled Victory Gardens Theater's rights to produce cullud wattah in 2022, citing allegations of racism and oppressive values. In 2022, it was announced that Dickerson-Despenza would be the first resident playwright of the Ntozake Shange Social Justice Theater Residency, an initiative from the Barnard Center for Research on Women, the Public Theater, and the Ntozake Shange Literary Trust.

shadow/land had its off-Broadway debut in 2023.

== Personal life ==
Dickerson-Despenza is queer and lives in New York.

== Plays ==
- cullud wattah
- shadow/land
- [hieroglyph]

== Awards and nominations ==
Year	Award	Work	Result	Ref.
2020	L. Arnold Weissberger New Play Award (Williamstown Theatre Festival)	cullud wattah	finalist	
2021	Susan Smith Blackburn Prize	cullud wattah	Won	
2022	Drama Desk Award for Outstanding Play	cullud wattah	Nominated	
2022	Forward Award (Wisconsin Alumni Foundation)	n/a	Won	
2023	PEN/Laura Pels International Foundation for Theater Award	n/a	Won	
