= Sibyl Kempson =

American playwright and performer (born 1973)

Sibyl Kempson (born 1973) is an American playwright and performer.

Kempson was raised in Pequannock Township, New Jersey.

== Academics and fellowships ==
She received her B.F.A. in 1995 from Bennington College and her M.F.A. in 2007 from Brooklyn College. Sibyl has taught at Brooklyn College, The New School, and Sarah Lawrence College.

She is a 2014 USA Rockefeller Fellow and a MacDowell Colony Fellow.

== Collaborators ==
New York City Players, Elevator Repair Service, Big Dance Theater, Advanced Beginner Group, Mike Iveson, Rude Mechanicals (theater company), Salvage Vanguard, Physical Plant, Rubber Rep. She received the 2018 PEN/Laura Pels International Foundation for Theater Award for an American Playwright in Mid-career.

She is a member of New Dramatists, class of 2017.

== Plays ==
- The Wytche of Problymm Plantation
- Bad Girls, Good Writers
- The Secret Death of Puppets (or) How Do Puppets Die? (or) Puppets Die In Secret
- Ich, Kürbisgeist
- Potatoes of August
- Crime or Emergency
- Restless Eye
- So Much To Go Crazy
- River of Gruel, Pile of Pigs: The Requisite Gesture(s) of Narrow Approach
