= Social Creatures =

Play by Jackie Drury

- Original language: English
- Written by: Jackie Sibblies Drury
- Subject: Thriller
- Genre: Drama, comedy, horror

Premiere
- Date: 2013
- Place: Trinity Repertory Company, Providence, RI

Social Creatures is a 2013 American zombie apocalypse themed play by Jackie Sibblies Drury.

== Productions ==
The play had its world premiere at Trinity Rep, Providence, Rhode Island in March 2013. The play was commissioned by Trinity Rep; Jackie Sibblies Drury was in residence there. The play was directed by Curt Columbus, who said "I knew that Jackie's interest lay not in creating a traditional zombie thriller - although there will be plenty of blood for those that are hoping for that - but also questioning our true nature, and where the true monsters are found."

== Plot ==
A handful of survivors in an abandoned building must deal with a zombie apocalypse.
