= Straight White Men =

2014 American play by Young Jean Lee

- Original language: English
- Written by: Young Jean Lee
- Genre: Drama, comedy
- Setting: House in Midwestern United States

Premiere
- Date: 2014
- Place: The Public Theater, New York City, New York

Straight White Men is a 2014 American play by Young Jean Lee. The play's 2018 production at the Hayes Theater made Lee the first Asian American woman to have a play produced on Broadway.

== Background ==
Much of Straight White Men was born out of a workshop Lee conducted with a group of women, people of color, and LGBTQ people. Lee was cognizant that the umbrella term "straight white man" represented the default "other" for marginalized groups, and so asked the workshop attendees what they thought of straight white men, and how they would prefer straight white men behave. After a lengthy discussion, the group decided the ideal straight white man was someone who was not aggressive, who was passive in social justice spaces, and overall did not interfere with their causes.

Lee took the ideas and created a straight white male character that fit the workshop's description: this became the character of Matt in the finished play. When Lee brought the character back to the workshop, however, she was surprised to discover that despite fitting everything the group claimed would make him better, the group hated him. On further discussion, they realized the factors that would have made Matt the ideal straight white man had also turned him into a loser, which made him even less likeable. From there, Lee became interested in unpacking what the label "straight white man" actually meant, and the unrealistic expectations behind it.

== Plot ==
The pre-show consists of "loud hip-hop with sexually explicit lyrics by female rappers." The pre-show and scene transitions are guided by Stagehand-In-Charge (or Stagehands-In-Charge, as done on Broadway with Kate Bornstein and Ty Defoe), who is "transgender or gender nonconforming."

During the Christmas holidays, three brothers return to their family home in the Midwestern United States to keep their widowed father, Ed, company. Drew is a writer, Jake is a banker, and Matt - the oldest brother, and a Harvard graduate - has moved back in with Ed. The family begins to question the reason for Matt's lack of ambition, while Matt insists that he is content.

== Productions ==
Straight White Men opened off-Broadway at the Public Theatre on November 7, 2014 and closed on December 14, 2014. The play was directed by the author, Young Jean Lee. The cast featured Austin Pendleton as "Ed", Pete Simpson, James Stanley, and Gary Wilmes.

The play was produced by the Steppenwolf Theatre Company, Chicago, in February 2017 to March 26, 2017 in a revised and restaged version. The Marin Theatre Company produced the play in June and July 2018. In January 2019, Washington Ensemble Theatre produced the Northwest Premiere in Seattle, WA.

The play made its Broadway premiere for a limited run on June 29, 2018 in previews at the Hayes Theatre, with the official opening July 23, running until September 9. Directed by Anna D. Shapiro, the cast featured Armie Hammer as Drew, Josh Charles as Jake, Paul Schneider as Matt, Kate Bornstein and Ty Defoe as the Stagehands-In-Charge, and Stephen Payne as Ed (Tom Skerritt left the show prior to opening and Denis Arndt left during previews).

== Reception ==
The Broadway production received mixed reviews from critics. The main source of criticism was that the piece was not as confrontational as Lee's other works, with The New Yorker critic Hilton Als writing "not only does it not exhibit any of the humor, recklessness, and passion of Lee's previous work; it refutes those things." Others praised it on the basis of the same reasoning, with Matthew Wexler writing for The Broadway Blog that Lee intentionally makes the production "a calculated portrait". Jesse Green, writing for The New York Times, compared the Broadway production under Shapiro's direction unfavorably to the 2014 production at the Public directed by Lee herself. Green noted that the Off-Broadway production "was shaggier and, paradoxically, more coherent," but overall received the play positively and concluded that the play "is still an exceedingly odd — and thus welcome — presence on Broadway. It remains undeniably powerful, especially when Mr. Schneider, excellent as the forlorn and heartbreaking Matt, tries to make his family understand something he can barely articulate to himself."
