= Lucille Lortel Awards =

Awards to recognize excellence in New York Off-Broadway theatre

- Awarded for: Excellence in Off-Broadway theatre
- Country: United States
- Presented by: The League of Off-Broadway Theatres and Producers
- First award: 1986; 40 years ago
- Website: http://www.lortelaward.com

The Lucille Lortel Awards recognize excellence in New York Off-Broadway theatre. The Awards are named for Lucille Lortel, an actress and theater producer, and have been awarded since 1986. They are produced by the League of Off-Broadway Theatres and Producers by special arrangement with the Lucille Lortel Foundation, with additional support from the Theatre Development Fund.

Other awards for off-Broadway theatre (although not necessarily exclusive to off-Broadway theatre) include the Drama League Award, Outer Critics Circle Awards, Drama Desk Awards and the Obie Awards, as well as the Henry Hewes Design Awards presented by the American Theatre Wing.

== Voting committee ==
The voting committee is composed of representatives from the Off-Broadway League, Actors' Equity Association, Stage Directors & Choreographers Society, the Lucille Lortel Foundation, as well as theatre journalists, academics, and other Off-Broadway professionals.

== Ceremonies ==
Season	Ceremony Date	Venue	Notes	Ref.
1990–1991	April 1, 1991	The Trophy Room at Gallagher's	Host: Lynne Meadow; Special Awards: Circle Repertory Theatre; Rosetta LeNoire	
1991-1992	May 11, 1992	Lucille Lortel Theatre	Host: Ernie Anastos, Special Awards: Terrence McNally; Blue Man Group; Ellen Stewart	
1992-1993	May 17, 1993	Lucille Lortel Theatre	Host: Ernie Anastos, Special Awards: John Lee Beatty; John Willis	
1993-1994	May 16, 1994	Lucille Lortel Theatre	Host: Bruce Weber, Special Awards: Theatre for a New Audience; A.R. Gurney; Irene Worth	
1994-1995	April 24, 1995	Lucille Lortel Theatre	Host: Wendy Wasserstein, Special Awards: Horton Foote; Uta Hagen; Signature Theatre Company	
1995-1996	May 6, 1996	Lucille Lortel Theatre	Hosts: Walter Cronkite and Wendy Wasserstein, Special Awards: Athol Fugard; Gene Feist; Edith Oliver	
1996-1997	May 5, 1997	Lucille Lortel Theatre	Host: Ernie Anastos, Special Awards: Gerard Alessandrini; Rob Fisher	
1997-1998	May 4, 1998	Lucille Lortel Theatre	Host: Jane Alexander, Special Award: Arthur Miller	
1998-1999	May 3, 1999	Lucille Lortel Theatre	Hosts: Bea Arthur and Ossie Davis, Special Awards: Harold Pinter; Tom Jones; Harvey Schmidt; Jerry Orbach; Brooklyn Academy of Music; Classic Stage Company	
1999-2000	May 1, 2000	Lucille Lortel Theatre	Hosts: Joy Behar and Sam Harris, Special Awards: Eileen Heckart; Jason Robards; Charles Busch and Israel Horovitz	
2000-2001	May 7, 2001	Lucille Lortel Theatre	Hosts: Alan Cumming and Brooke Shields, Special Awards: Lanford Wilson; New York Theatre Workshop; Kitty Carlisle Hart	
2001-2002	May 6, 2002	Lucille Lortel Theatre	Hosts: Tim Robbins and Susan Sarandon , Special Awards: Edward Albee; Ruby Dee; Elaine Stritch at Liberty; Second Stage Theatre	
2002-2003	May 5, 2003	Lucille Lortel Theatre	Host: B.D. Wong, Special Awards: Marian Seldes; The Exonerated; Vineyard Theatre	
2003-2004	May 3, 2004	Minetta Lane Theatre	Hosts: Richard Thomas and Joanna Gleason, Special Awards: Kathleen Chalfant; The Public Theater; Noche Flamenca	
2004-2005	May 2, 2005	Dodger's Stages	Hosts: Julie Halston and Bruce Vilanch, Special Awards: Frances Sternhagen; Irish Repertory Theatre	
2005-2006	May 1, 2006	New World Stages	Hosts: Judy Gold and Brían F. O'Byrne, Special Awards: Wendy Wasserstein; John Patrick Shanley; Betty Corwin; Atlantic Theater Company	
2006-2007	May 7, 2007	New World Stages	Hosts: Bebe Neuwirth and Bobby Cannavale, Special Awards: Christopher Durang; Actors' Fund of America	
2007-2008	May 5, 2008	Union Square Theater	Host: Julie White, Special Awards: Theodore Mann; Primary Stages; New York Theatre Workshop's Horizon	
2008–2009	May 3, 2009	Marriott Marquis Hotel	Host: Kristen Johnston, Special Awards: Ira Weitzman; The Lark Play Development Center	
2009–2010	May 2, 2010	Terminal 5	Hosts: Bryan Batt and Bebe Neuwirth, Special Awards: Daryl Roth; Lincoln Center Theatre	
2010–2011	May 1, 2011	NYU Skirball Center	Hosts: Zach Braff, Samantha Bee, Special Awards: Lynne Meadow; Gary Glaser; Gatz	
2011–2012	May 6, 2012	NYU Skirball Center	Host: Mario Cantone, Special Awards: Richard Frankel; Richard Foreman; FDNY; Voca People	
2012–2013	May 5, 2013	NYU Skirball Center	Hosts: Aasif Mandvi, Maura Tierney, Special Awards: Todd Haimes; Neil LaBute; Theatre Development Fund; Old Hats	
2013–2014	May 4, 2014	NYU Skirball Center	Hosts: Megan Mullally, Nick Offerman, Special Awards: Robyn Goodman; Richard Nelson	
2014–2015	May 10, 2015	NYU Skirball Center	Hosts: Jesse Tyler Ferguson, Anna Chlumsky, Special Awards: Terrence McNally; Jeanine Tesori; Nancy Nagel Gibb	
2015–2016	May 8, 2016	NYU Skirball Center	Host: Zachary Levi, Special Awards: Oskar Eustis; The Wooster Group	
2016–2017	May 7, 2017	NYU Skirball Center	Host: Taran Killam, Special Awards: David Hyde Pierce; Elevator Repair Service	
2017–2018	May 6, 2018	NYU Skirball Center	Hosts: Laura Benanti and Jeremy Shamos, Special Awards: Kathleen Chalfant; The York Theatre Company	
2018–2019	May 5, 2019	NYU Skirball Center	Host: Mike Birbiglia, Special Awards: Edward Albee (posthumous); Page 73 Productions	
2019–2020	Postponed due to the COVID-19 pandemic			
2020–2021	May 2, 2021	Virtual	Held virtually due to the COVID-19 pandemic	
2021–2022	May 1, 2022	NYU Skirball Center	Hosts: Jelani Alladin, Jared Grimes, Jeff Hiller, Krysta Rodriguez, Christopher Sieber and Jennifer Simard, Special Awards: Deirdre O'Connell; David Henry Hwang	
2022–2023	May 7, 2023	NYU Skirball Center	Hosts: Kevin Cahoon, D'Arcy Carden, Crystal Lucas-Perry, Bonnie Milligan, Arian Moayed and Tamara Tunie, Special Awards: Stephen McKinley Henderson; Ntozake Shange	
2023-2024	May 5, 2024	NYU Skirball Center	Hosts: Rosalind Chao, Jenn Colella, Michael Esper, Eden Espinosa, B.D. Wong and Nikki M. James, Special Awards: Ruben Santiago-Hudson; Dominique Morisseau; Ars Nova	
2024-2025	May 4, 2025	NYU Skirball Center	Hosts: Ilana Glazer, Maya Hawke, Stephanie Nur, and Alaska Thunderfuck, Special Awards: Alice Childress; New Federal Theatre; Carol Fishman	
2025-2026	May 3, 2026	NYU Skirball Center	Special Awards: Mia Katigbak; William Finn	

== Categories ==
At the beginning, the Lead Actor/Actress and Featured Actor/Actress awards encompassed both plays and musicals. Starting in 2014, the acting awards were split into separate play and musical categories.

Starting with the 2022 awards, the acting categories were made gender-neutral.

=== Current categories ===
Awards are given in the following categories:

- Outstanding Play
- Outstanding Musical
- Outstanding Revival
- Outstanding Solo Show
- Outstanding Director
- Outstanding Choreographer
- Outstanding Lead Performer in a Play
- Outstanding Featured Performer in a Play
- Outstanding Lead Performer in a Musical
- Outstanding Featured Performer in a Musical
- Outstanding Ensemble|Outstanding Ensemble
- Outstanding Scenic Design
- Outstanding Costume Design
- Outstanding Lighting Design
- Outstanding Sound Design
- Outstanding Projection Design

=== Special categories ===
- Outstanding Alternative Theater Experience
- Outstanding Lifetime Achievement
- Outstanding Body of Work
- Playwrights’ Sidewalk Inductee
- Edith Oliver Award for Sustained Excellence/Service to Off-Broadway

=== Retired Categories ===
- Outstanding Lead Actor in a Play
- Outstanding Lead Actress in a Play
- Outstanding Lead Actor in a Musical
- Outstanding Lead Actress in a Musical
- Outstanding Featured Actor in a Play
- Outstanding Featured Actress in a Play
- Outstanding Featured Actor in a Musical
- Outstanding Featured Actress in a Musical

== Award winners in key categories ==
=== Production Awards ===
==== Outstanding Play ====
- 1987: The Common Pursuit
- 1989: The Cocktail Hour
- 1991: Aristocrats
- 1992: Lips Together, Teeth Apart
- 1993: The Destiny of Me
- 1994: Three Tall Women
- 1995: Camping with Henry & Tom
- 1996: Molly Sweeney
- 1997: How I Learned to Drive
- 1998: Gross Indecency: The Three Trials of Oscar Wilde
- 1999: Wit
- 2000: Dinner With Friends
- 2001: Proof
- 2002: Metamorphoses
- 2003: Take Me Out
- 2004: Bug
- 2005: Doubt
- 2006: The Lieutenant of Inishmore
- 2007: Stuff Happens
- 2008: Betrayed
- 2009: Ruined
- 2010: The Orphans' Home Cycle
- 2011: The Elaborate Entrance of Chad Deity
- 2012: Sons of the Prophet
- 2013: The Whale
- 2014: Bad Jews
- 2015: Between Riverside and Crazy
- 2016: Guards at the Taj
- 2017: Oslo
- 2018: Cost of Living and School Girls; Or, the African Mean Girls Play
- 2019: Pass Over
- 2020: Heroes of the Fourth Turning
- 2022: English
- 2023: Wolf Play
- 2024: The Comeuppance
- 2025: Here There Are Blueberries
- 2026: Prince Faggot

==== Outstanding Musical ====
- 1991: Falsettoland
- 1992: And the World Goes Round…
- 1993: Forbidden Broadway
- 1994: Wings
- 1995: Jelly Roll!
- 1996: Floyd Collins
- 1997: Violet
- 2000: James Joyce’s The Dead
- 2001: Bat Boy: The musical
- 2002: Urinetown
- 2003: Avenue Q
- 2004: Caroline, or Change
- 2005: The 25th Annual Putnam County Spelling Bee
- 2006: The Seven
- 2007: In the Heights and Spring Awakening
- 2008: Adding Machine
- 2009: Fela! A New Musical
- 2010: The Scottsboro Boys
- 2011: Bloody Bloody Andrew Jackson
- 2012: Once
- 2013: Dogfight
- 2014: Fun Home
- 2015: Hamilton
- 2016: FUTURITY
- 2017: The Band's Visit
- 2018: KPOP
- 2019: Rags Parkland Sings the Songs of the Future
- 2020: Octet
- 2022: Kimberly Akimbo
- 2023: Titanique
- 2024: (pray)
- 2025: Three Houses
- 2026: Mexodus

==== Outstanding Revival ====
- 1991: Measure For Measure
- 1992: Boesman and Lena
- 1993: Henry V
- 1994: Owners, Traps
- 1995: Merrily We Roll Along
- 1996: Entertaining Mr. Sloan
- 1997: June Moon
- 1998: All My Sons
- 1999: The Mystery of Irma Vep
- 2000: The Torch-Bearers
- 2001: Tiny Alice
- 2002: Cymbeline
- 2003: Fifth of July
- 2005: Counsellor-At-Law
- 2006: The Trip to Bountiful
- 2007: Two Trains Running
- 2008: Ohio State Murders
- 2009: Our Town
- 2010: The Glass Menagerie
- 2011: Angels in America: A Gay Fantasia on National Themes/Part 1: MillenniumApproaches, Part 2: Perestroika
- 2012: The Cherry Orchard
- 2013: The Piano Lesson
- 2014: Good Person of Szechwan
- 2015: Into the Woods
- 2016: The Robber Bridegroom
- 2017: Sweeney Todd: The Demon Barber of Fleet Street
- 2018: Jesus Hopped the 'A' Train
- 2019: Carmen Jones
- 2020: for colored girls who have considered suicide/when the rainbow is enuf
- 2022: Twilight: Los Angeles, 1992
- 2023: A Raisin in the Sun
- 2024: Translations
- 2025: Our Class
- 2026: 25th Annual Putnam County Spelling Bee

=== Honorary Awards ===
==== Outstanding Lifetime Achievement ====
- 1988: Paul Libin
- 1991: Rosetta LeNoire
- 1992: Ellen Stewart
- 1993: Wynn Handman
- 1995: Uta Hagen
- 1996: Gene Feist
- 1997: Jane Alexander
- 1998: Arthur Miller
- 1999: Harold Pinter
- 2000: Jason Robards
- 2001: Kitty Carlisle Hart
- 2002: Edward Albee
- 2003: Stephen Sondheim
- 2006: Wendy Wasserstein
- 2007: Kevin Kline
- 2010: Daryl Roth
- 2011: Lynne Meadow
- 2012: Richard Frankel
- 2013: Todd Haimes
- 2015: Terrence McNally
- 2016: Robyn Goodman
- 2017: William Ivey Long
- 2018: Eve Ensler
- 2020: Tim Sanford
- 2022: Deirdre O’Connell
- 2023: Stephen McKinley Henderson
- 2024: Ruben Santiago-Hudson
- 2025: No award given.
- 2026: Mia Katigbak

==== Playwright Sidewalk Inductee(s) ====
- 1999: Tom Jones & Harvey Schmidt
- 2000: Charles Busch & Israel Horowitz
- 2002: Romulus Linney
- 2004: Tony Kushner
- 2005: Charles Ludlam
- 2006: John Patrick Shanley
- 2007: Christopher Durang
- 2012: Richard Foreman
- 2013: Neil LaBute
- 2014: Richard Nelson
- 2015: Jeanine Tesori
- 2016: Suzan-Lori Parks
- 2017: Lynn Nottage
- 2018: Michael Friedman
- 2019: María Irene Fornés
- 2020: Anna Deavere Smith
- 2022: David Henry Hwang
- 2023: Ntozake Shange
- 2024: Dominique Morisseau
- 2025: Alice Childress
- 2026: William Finn

==== Outstanding Body of Work ====
- 2018: WP Theater
- 2019: Telsey + Company
- 2020: Not awarded
- 2021: Not awarded
- 2022: Not awarded
- 2023: The Alliance of Resident Theatres/New York
- 2024: Ars Nova
- 2025: New Federal Theatre

== See also ==
- Drama Desk Award
- Drama League Award
- Tony Awards
