= We're Gonna Die =

American Play

- Original language: English
- Written by: Young Jean Lee
- Genre: Drama, comedy, musical

Premiere
- Date: April 2011
- Place: Joe's Pub, New York City, New York

We're Gonna Die is a 2011 American play by Young Jean Lee.

== Productions ==
We're Gonna Die was first produced at Joe's Pub, closing in April 2011. Young Jean Lee performed the solo role, accompanied by the band Future Wife.

We're Gonna Die was produced at Lincoln Center Theater’s Claire Tow Theater for four performances from September 12 to 15 in 2012. The play was produced again at the Claire Tow Theater from August 5 to 17 in 2013.

Future Wife's debut album, We’re Gonna Die was released August 6, 2013. It features members of various New York projects, including David Byrne, Laurie Anderson, Adam Horovitz, Kathleen Hanna, Sarah Neufeld, Colin Stetson, Drew Daniel and Martin Schmidt of Matmos, Cloud Becomes Your Hand, San Fermin, Field Guides, and Landlady, in monologue and musical roles.

In August 2015, a production was part of David Byrne's Meltdown takeover series at Southbank Centre in London. It featured David Byrne as the lead singer while Lee performed the monologues with Future Wife performing.

In 2020, an Off-Broadway production of the show by Second Stage Theater was directed and choreographed by Raja Feather Kelly. It opened in Tony Kiser Theater on February 4 and was scheduled to run through March 22. Janelle McDermoth played the lead role of the Singer. The production closed early due to the COVID-19 pandemic.

== Summary ==
Young Jean Lee, with her band along with her, tells tragic stories from her life.

=== Uncle John ===
As a child, Lee’s Uncle John was “...the most isolated person I ever knew.” (Uncle John) One day Lee hid under his bed while he brushed his teeth and planned to scare him by grabbing his ankles. When Uncle John walked in he sat down at a desk and started muttering to himself, “I’m a piece shit. I’m shit” over and over again. As he was saying this to himself he started crying. He did this until he eventually fell asleep. Lee then snuck out of his room and thought to herself, “Is this how Uncle John falls asleep every night?”(Uncle John). Lee then goes on to talk about a “public mask” that people wear to hide the pain. And when you’re hiding your pain you’re all alone while doing it.

=== Emily & Jenny ===
This story is about her friends when she was six. Her two friends Emily and Jenny both had bikes and Lee would chase after them until she couldn’t anymore then walk back until they came back around. They would do this all the time for fun. One day they decided to teach Lee how to ride a bike and she ended up bleeding from all her joints. Although she was covered in blood she was still determined to learn how to ride the bike. Eventually she got it. About a year later a new girl moved into the neighborhood and joined their friend group. It got to the point where they would hang out with the new girl without inviting Lee. One day at school during recess Lee came up to them and they all ran away from her, making it very clear that she was not supposed to chase after them. This is the moment she realized that they weren’t her friends anymore. That night she couldn't sleep. This was the first time in her life where she felt this type of way. Her mom came into her room to check on her and what she said to Lee was conveyed through the song, “Lullaby for the Miserable”. The song was saying how even though you’re sad or you’re feeling down you’ll eventually fall asleep and that you’re not the only one.

=== Family Reunion ===
In this story Lee talks about romance. She says that she never found romance until after she had graduated college. When she had started getting her life together she met this guy named Henry. Henry was this amazing guy who Lee was really looking forward to showing him off to her family at this family reunion. During the family reunion she had overheard her mother talking, “...I heard my mother tell my aunt how she could never feel the same way about me as she felt about my sister.”(Family Reunion). Later that night she told Henry what happened but he is an only child so he could never really understand. As Lee lay in bed she told herself something that she tells everyone listening in the form of the song, “I Still Have You”. The song is about her still having her boyfriend and her boyfriend still having her and if either one of them dies first the other will be lonely.

=== Henry ===
This story starts with Lee saying that Henry had dumped her. Before Henry had moved out, Lee said that she was going to a friend's house because it would be too painful to watch him move all his stuff. She had also asked him to rearrange all the furniture so that she didn’t have to see all the empty spots of where his stuff used to be. When she came back to her house the furniture had been perfectly rearranged. When she had noticed that half of the books from the bookshelf, they were Henry’s, were missing she had realized that she now lived alone. The song, “No Comfort For The Lonely” starts playing after the story ends. The song is about how the lonely will never hear any words of comfort. The song shows how she was lost in despair after the break up but the second half of the song shows that she is finally getting over it.

=== White Hair ===
Lee finds her first white hair and she had never really thought about getting older and losing her looks, etc. It all hit her at once and she had a freak out and went to her mom for help. She says how her next song will be an impersonation of her mom doing an impersonation of her grandmother. The song is called, “When You Get Old”. Lee sings about how getting old is awful and you’re going to want to die. “When you get old all your friends will die and you will be a burden to the world.”(When You Get Old)

=== Father ===
Lee’s father was diagnosed with advanced stage lung cancer and only had a year and a half to live. He was a very healthy person and survived chemotherapy for three years while working. One day the father went to the doctor and they said there was this miracle drug that only less than two percent of people have the genetics to take, and it will save her father’s life. Where they had the trial to test if he has the genetic mutation was a six hour long drive. Her father was not in the best health to travel but they made the trip anyway. The test took two full days and then they had to wait a month to get the results back. When the test results came back it was positive. He was part of that two percent. They had gone back to the clinic that was six hours away, but when they got there they told them that the blood sample wasn’t large enough. They needed to retake the sample and wait another month for the results so that they could release the medication. The only concern was that they didn’t think he would live that long. They asked a doctor to just give them the medication but legally he could not because it wasn’t guaranteed that it would work on him. All the doctor could do was put a rush on the medication. As they waited they stayed at a hotel and her father’s condition worsened. He was barely able to breathe, even with an oxygen tank. Eventually he had to be hospitalized to keep him stable. This is when Lee shows up. One night while Lee slept at the hospital her father woke up in a panic trying to rip out the tube that was down his throat, feeding him oxygen. This kept happening throughout the night. The nurses say it is because when you’re sedated you wake up not knowing anything or what’s going on so you panic. Lee had a terrible thought that her father did know what was going on and he was trying to take the tube out of his mouth so that he could say something. They couldn’t do anything but keep the cycle going because if they gave him more sedatives he would die and if they took the tube out of his throat he would die. The next morning the blood sample came back confirming her father’s genetic mutation, but he died that afternoon. Lee was enraged by this situation and by what happened with her father. She wasn’t eating and couldn’t sleep. When someone tried to help her she would just get even more angry, until she got a letter from her friend Beth.

=== Beth ===
This story starts off with Lee telling us about her friend Beth before she gets to the letter. Beth was a married woman with kids. She had found out that her husband had been sleeping with many other women ever since they had started dating. He claims that all of them were purely just for sex and that he only truly loved her. Except now he had found someone new that he loved and was going to leave Beth and the children to go be with this other person. Lee had helped Beth through that trauma. When Beth heard about what had happened with her father she wrote a letter. Lee tells the listeners about the letter through the song, “Horrible Things.” The song is telling Lee that no one goes through life without having something bad happen to them. “Who do you think you are? To be immune from tragedy. What makes you so special? That you should go unscathed.”(Horrible Things).

=== Conclusion ===
Lee realizes that everyone goes through something awful and she was able to find a little bit of comfort in knowing that it’s not just her.
