= New York City Players =

Coordinates: 40.68513°N 73.97340°W

New York City Players is a not-for-profit New York City-based experimental theatre company founded in 1999 by playwright and director Richard Maxwell to present his work. The company has produced approximately 30 new plays in New York and has toured in over 20 countries. Among their notable productions are Ode to the Man Who Kneels and People Without History, the latter at the Performing Garage in SoHo, Manhattan. The company's works have also been presented at Performance Space New York, The Kitchen, and Soho Rep in New York, and in Paris, Brussels, Dublin, London, and Germany.

Aside from the works of Maxwell, the company has also created a limited number of works through partnerships with other artists and companies, including Devotion with choreographer Sarah Michelson, The Early Plays with The Wooster Group, and Open Rehearsal at the 2012 Whitney Biennial.

The company runs two programs, the American Playwright Division, which produces plays written and directed by emerging playwrights, and the Incoming Theatre Division, a program which provides resources and production support to immigrant New Yorkers to develop their stories into theatrical works.

== Productions ==
Plays by Richard Maxwell

- Billings (1996)
- Flight Courier Service (1997)
- Burger King (1997)
- Ute Mnos v. Crazy Liquors (1998)
- House (1998)
- Cowboys and Indians (1999)
- Showy Lady Slipper (1999)
- Boxing 2000 (1999)
- Caveman (2000)
- Drummer Wanted (2001)
- Joe (2002)
- Showcase (2003)
- Henry IV Part 1 (2003)
- Good Samaritans (2004, 2017)
- The End of Reality (2006)
- Ode to the Man Who Kneels (2007)
- People Without History (2009)
- Ads (2010)
- Neutral Hero (2010)
- Open Rehearsal (2012)
- Isolde (2013)
- The Evening (2015)
- Paradiso (2018)

American Playwrights Division

- Vision Disturbance (2010 premiere; toured nationally and internationally through 2017) - written by Christina Masciotti and directed by Richard Maxwell
- Dreamless Land (2011) - written and directed by Julia Jarcho
- House of Dance (2013) - written and directed by Tina Satter
- Really (2016) - written by Jackie Sibblies Drury and directed by Richard Maxwell

Incoming Theatre Division

- I Came From There, I Am Here Now (2016) - directed by Tory Vazquez
- The Second Wedding of Yasmin Blessing to Jeff Jackman Jr. (2017) - directed by Tory Vazquez
- Immigration Stories (2018) - directed by Tory Vazquez
