= Gene Feist =

Gene Feist (January 16, 1923 – March 17, 2014, New York City) was an American playwright, theater director and co-founder of the Roundabout Theater Company. He authored 15 plays or adaptations, of which two were published by Samuel French Inc. – James Joyce's Dublin and The Lady from Maxim's.

== Early life ==
Feist was born Eugene Feist in Brooklyn, the son of Hattie (Fishbein), a beautician, and Henry Feist, a bar owner and, later, a cab driver. Along with his identical twin brother Harold, Feist grew up in the Coney Island neighborhood of Brooklyn. His father owned and operated a bar in Coney Island at Seagate and Surf Avenue named Indian Village but referred to as "The Bucket of Blood" due to its rough clientele. Feist's love of reading made him a target of teasing during his youth. He attended a vocational high school for newspaper printing press operators. After graduating he joined the United States Army Air Forces where he was trained as an airplane mechanic but quickly moved to a post as editor of the Biggs (Texas) Air Field newspaper, "Bigg Stuff". During World War II he was stationed in the Philippines and later occupied Japan, writing for other military newspapers and serving as a librarian.

After the war he attended Carnegie Tech, which later became Carnegie Mellon University. There he became a close friend of the artist and fellow student Andy Warhol.

== Career ==
With his wife Kathe, known professionally as stage actress "Elizabeth Owens", he revived the New Theater in Nashville, Tennessee, and, in 1965, Gene and Kathe Feist founded the Roundabout Theatre Company, first located in the basement of a supermarket building owned by the housing development in Manhattan where the Feists lived. Owens appeared in more than 30 plays over the next 25 years, while Gene Feist served as the Roundabout's founding director.

In the 1960s, Gene Feist was the Dramatics Teacher and Director of the Drama Department at New Rochelle High School and 7th grade English Teacher at Albert Leonard Junior High School, in the city of New Rochelle, New York.

== Personal life ==
Feist married Irma "Kathe" Schneider (February 26, 1928 – March 7, 2005) on February 10, 1957. They had two daughters. The couple reached their 48th wedding anniversary several weeks before her death.

== Death ==
Kathe Feist predeceased him. She died from breast cancer, aged 77, on March 7, 2005. Gene Feist died at the age of 91 on March 17, 2014, in Englewood, New Jersey. He is survived by two daughters, a grandson and a granddaughter.
