= Connelly Theater =

Off-Broadway theater in Manhattan, New York

- Interactive map of Connelly Theater
- Address: 220 E 4th St; Manhattan, New York City; United States
- Coordinates: 40°43′25″N 73°59′00″W
- Capacity: 99–165
- Type: Off-Broadway

Website
- www.connellytheater.org

The Connelly Theater is an Off-Broadway theater at 220 East 4th Street in the East Village of Manhattan in New York City. It was originally built in the 1860s as the choir hall for an orphanage. The theater consists of a 200-seat main auditorium and a smaller 50-seat black box rented from the Roman Catholic Archdiocese of New York, by the Cornelia Connelly Center, an education non-profit that also operates a middle school in the building. In the 2010s and early 2020s, the theater became a celebrated off-Broadway venue, with programming curated by Director & General Manager Josh Luxenberg. In 2024, the Archdiocese of New York began restricting the theater from staging shows that were not approved by the Catholic Church, leading to Luxenberg's resignation and the shuttering of the theater as a space for public performance.
