= Jackie Sibblies Drury =

American playwright

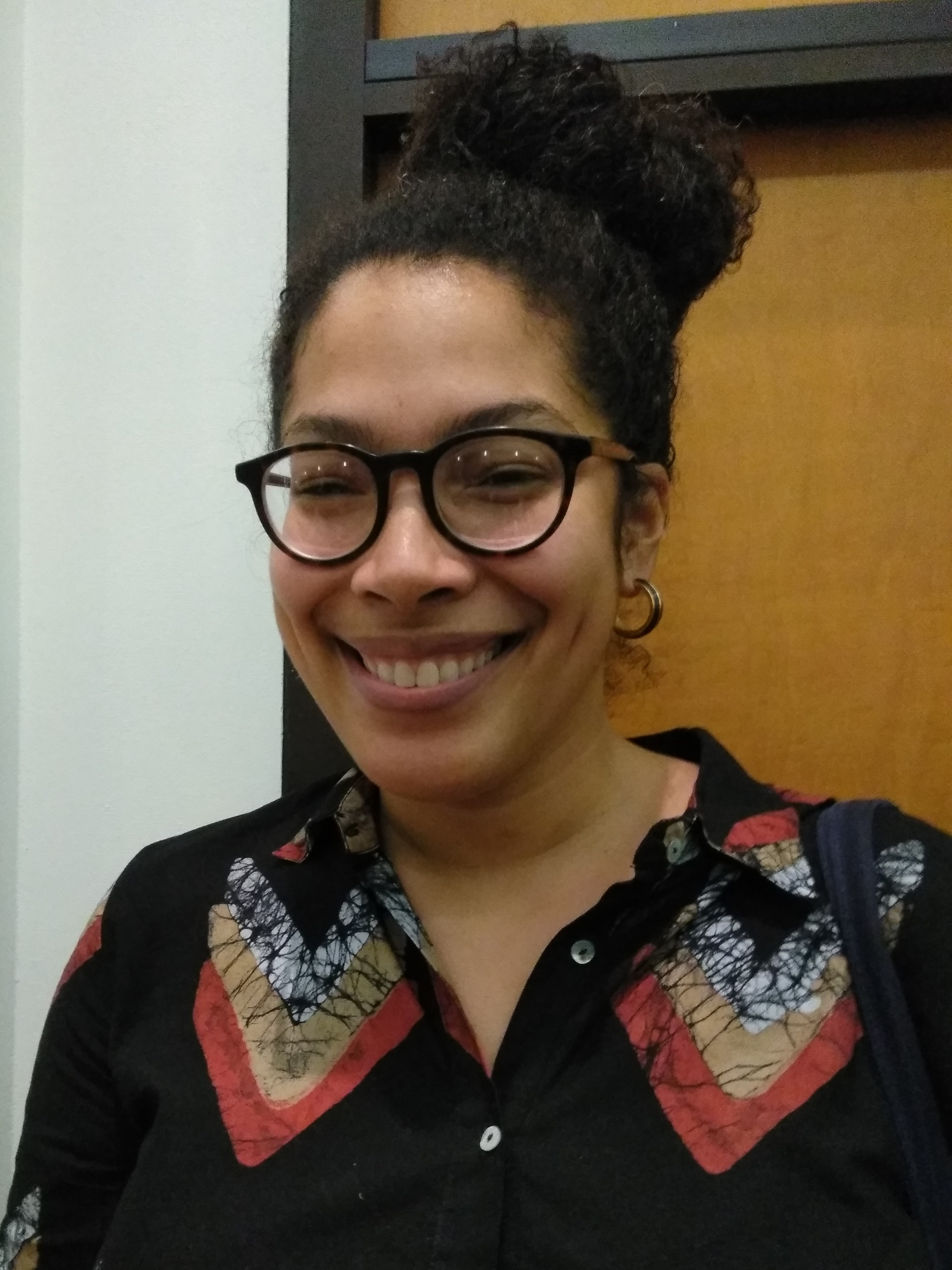
- Drury in 2018
- Born: United States
- Education: Yale University (BA); Brown University (MFA)
- Occupations: Playwright, screenwriter
- Writing career
- Language: English
- Genres: Theatre, drama

Jackie Sibblies Drury is an American playwright and screenwriter. The New York Times called Drury's 2012 play We Are Proud to Present a Presentation About the Herero of Namibia, Formerly Known as Southwest Africa, From the German Sudwestafrika, Between the Years 1884–1915 "her breakout work". Her subsequent works include Social Creatures (2013) and Fairview (2018); for the latter, Drury received the 2019 Pulitzer Prize for Drama.

== Early life and education ==
Jackie Sibblies Drury was raised by her Jamaican immigrant mother and grandmother in Plainfield, New Jersey. Drury's mother enrolled her at a private school in New Jersey where she witnessed the persistence of "segregation even in a harmonious community."

Drury attended Yale University, where she majored in literature. She received her MFA in playwriting from Brown University in 2010.

== Works ==
=== Full-length plays ===
- We Are Proud to Present a Presentation About the Herero of Namibia, Formerly Known as Southwest Africa, From the German Sudwestafrika, Between the Years 1884–1915 (2012)
- Social Creatures (2013)
- Really (2016)
- Fairview (2018)
- Marys Seacole (2019)
- Illinoise (2023) - with Justin Peck & Sufjan Stevens

=== Television ===
- In Treatment (2021; season 4)

== Awards and honors ==
She was a winner of the Windham-Campbell Literature Prize for Drama in 2015.

She was awarded the 2019 Susan Smith Blackburn Prize for her play Fairview. The prize has a cash award of $25,000. Fairview was presented Off-Broadway in 2018 by Berkeley Repertory Theatre and Soho Rep.

Fairview was also awarded the 2019 Pulitzer Prize for Drama for this "hard-hitting drama that examines race in a highly conceptual, layered structure, ultimately bringing audiences into the actors’ community to face deep-seated prejudices."

She received the 2019 Steinberg Playwright Award for Fairview, which includes a $50,000 cash prize.

Drury received PEN/Laura Pels International Foundation for Theatre Award in 2022.
