= Raja Feather Kelly =

American dancer and choreographer

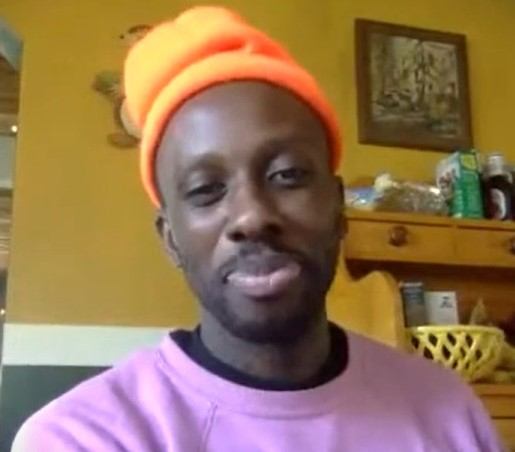
- Kelly interviewed on HowlRound in 2021
- Born: 1986 or 1987 (age 38–39)
- Education: Connecticut College (BA)
- Known for: Choreography
- Awards: Doris Duke Artist Award (2025)
- Website: thefeath3rtheory.com

Raja Feather Kelly is an American dancer and choreographer based in Brooklyn who is notable for his "radical downtown surrealist" productions which combine "pop and queer culture". He has choreographed numerous theatrical productions, including Fairview and A Strange Loop. He is the artistic director of his dance company called The Feath3r Theory, and he serves as the artistic director of the New Brooklyn Theatre.

== Early life ==
Kelly grew up in Fort Hood, Texas and later in Long Branch, New Jersey, where he graduated from Long Branch High School and was selected to participate in the theater program of the Governor's School of the Arts. He attended Connecticut College where he studied English and poetry and dance, graduating in 2009.

== Career ==
Reviewer Sara Aridi in The New York Times wrote that "one leaves a performance of Raja's infected by his curiosity, love of craft and just plain outrageousness." His choreography was described in Vogue magazine as combining social dance with the black vernacular. Critic Brian Schaefer in The New York Times wrote that Kelly's choreography has a "lighter touch, a flirty wink and a queer sensibility" that "treats pop culture as a kind of religion itself." A prime influence of Kelly in his approach to dance was the American visual and pop artist Andy Warhol. Kelly has raised money for dance production by hosting telethons out of his apartment.

In 2020, Kelly directed and choreographed an Off-Broadway production of We're Gonna Die by Young Jean Lee. It opened in Second Stage Theater's Tony Kiser Theater on February 4 and was scheduled to run through March 22.

== Awards and honors ==
In 2025, Kelly received a Doris Duke Artist Award, "the largest prize in the United States that is dedicated to individual performing artists" from the Doris Duke Foundation.

In addition, he has received the following awards and honors:

- National Dance Project Production Grant, 2019
- New York Live Arts (2019)
  SDCF Commission Award (2019)
- Randjelovic-Stryker Award (2019)
- Harkness Promise Award (2018)
- Carthorse Fellowship (2018)
- Solange MacArthur Award (2016)
- Dancemapolitan Award (2016)
- NYFA Choreography Fellow (2016)
- Dixon Place Dance Artist (2015)
- Dance Web Scholar (2009)
