= Young Jean Lee =

American playwright, director and filmmaker

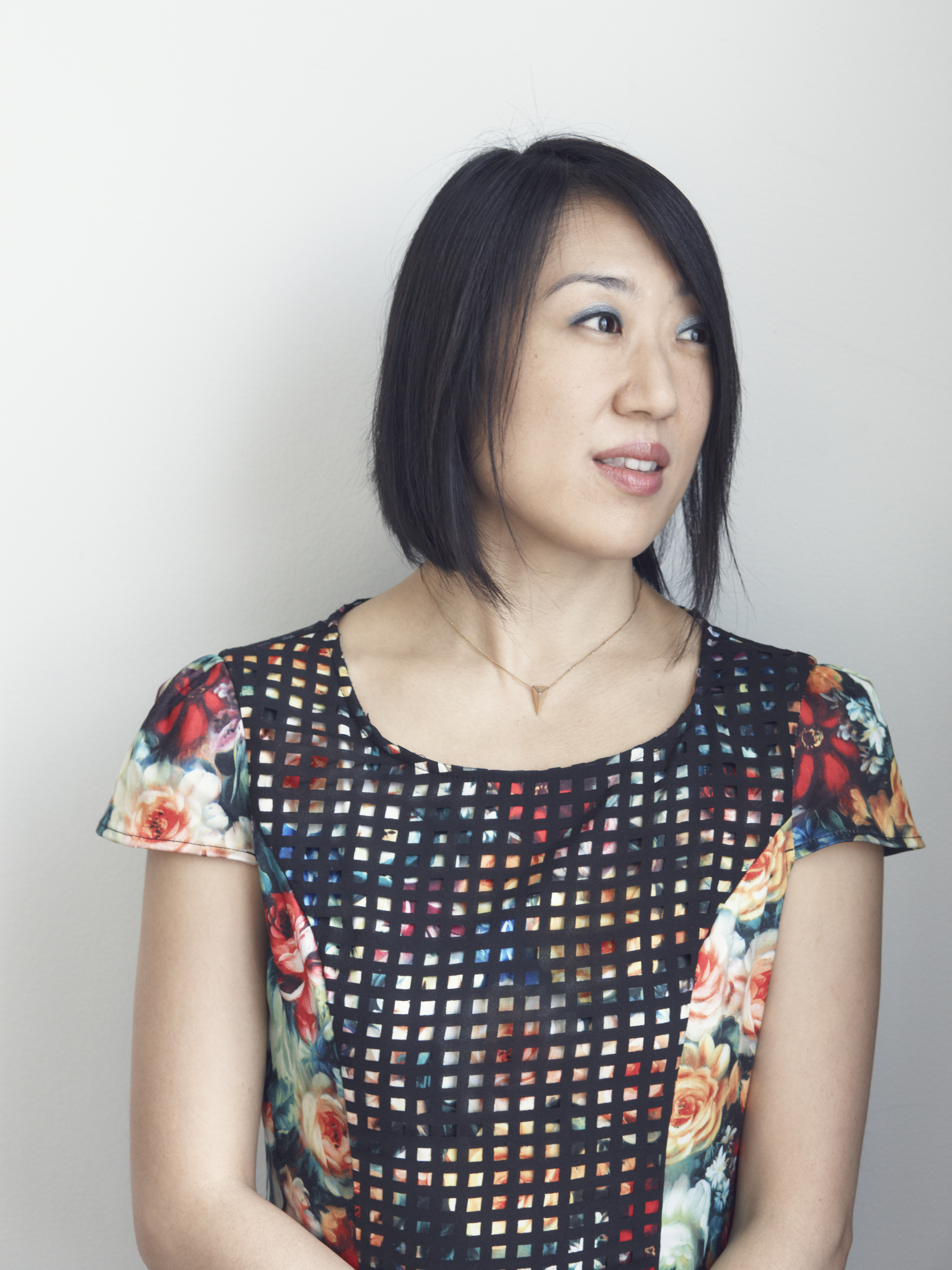
- Lee in 2014
- Born: 1974 (age 51–52); Daegu, South Korea
- Education: University of California, Berkeley (BA); Brooklyn College (MFA)
- Occupations: Playwright, director, filmmaker
- Writing career
- Period: Contemporary
- Movements: Experimental, Avant-garde

Korean name
- Hangul: 이영진
- RR: I Yeongjin
- MR: I Yŏngjin
- Website: Official website

Young Jean Lee (born 1974) is an American playwright, director, and filmmaker. She was the Artistic Director of Young Jean Lee's Theater Company, a not-for-profit theater company dedicated to producing her work. She has written and directed ten shows for Young Jean Lee's Theater Company and toured her work to over thirty cities around the world. Lee was called "the most adventurous downtown playwright of her generation" by Charles Isherwood in The New York Times and "one of the best experimental playwrights in America" by David Cote in Time Out New York. With the 2018 production of Straight White Men at the Hayes Theater, Lee became the first Asian American woman to have a play produced on Broadway.

== Background ==
Lee was born in South Korea and moved to the United States when she was two years old. She grew up in Pullman, Washington and attended college at UC Berkeley, where she majored in English and graduated summa cum laude and Phi Beta Kappa. Immediately after college, Lee entered UC Berkeley's English Ph.D. program, where she studied Shakespeare for six years before moving to New York to become a playwright. She received an MFA from Mac Wellman's playwriting program at Brooklyn College.

Lee is the granddaughter of Son Chint'ae, the founder of the academic study of folklore in Korea, who was kidnapped to North Korea during the North Korean invasion of 1950.

== Works ==
=== Theater ===
Lee's plays have been presented in New York City at Second Stage Theater (Straight White Men and We're Gonna Die), The Public Theater (Straight White Men), the Baryshnikov Arts Center (Untitled Feminist Show), LCT3/Lincoln Center Theater (We're Gonna Die), Joe's Pub (We're Gonna Die), Soho Repertory Theater (Lear and The Appeal), The Kitchen (The Shipment) The Public Theater (Church), P.S. 122 (Church), Pullman, Washington, HERE Arts Center (Songs of the Dragons Flying to Heaven), and the Ontological-Hysteric Theater (Groundwork of the Metaphysics of Morals). Her work has toured venues in Paris, Vienna, Hannover, Berlin, Zurich, Brussels, Budapest, Sydney, Melbourne, Bergen, Brighton, Hamburg, Oslo, Trondheim, Rotterdam, Salamanca, Graz, Seoul, Zagreb, Toulouse, Toronto, Calgary, Antwerp, Athens, London, Chicago, Chapel Hill, Los Angeles, Portland, Seattle, San Francisco, Philadelphia, Columbus, Pittsburgh, Boston, New Hampshire, Williamstown, and Minneapolis.

==== Plays ====
- Straight White Men (2014)
- Untitled Feminist Show (2011)
- We're Gonna Die (2011)
- Lear (2010)
- The Shipment (2009)
- Church (2007)
- Songs of the Dragons Flying to Heaven (2006)
- Pullman, WA (2005)
- The Appeal (2004)
- Groundwork of the Metaphysic of Morals (2003)
- Yaggoo (2003)

=== Film ===
Her first short film, Here Come the Girls, had its world premiere at the Locarno International Film Festival, its U.S. premiere at the Sundance Film Festival, and its New York premiere at BAMcinemaFest. Two of her other short films--A Meaning Full Life and Reenactment—also had their New York premieres at BAMcinemaFest.

=== Music ===
Her band, Future Wife, released their debut album, We’re Gonna Die, in 2013. The band features members of various New York projects, including Cloud Becomes Your Hand, San Fermin, Field Guides, and Landlady. The album also features monologues performed by Adam Horovitz (Beastie Boys), Kathleen Hanna (Bikini Kill), Sarah Neufeld (Arcade Fire), Martin Schmidt and Drew Daniel (Matmos), Colin Stetson, David Byrne (Talking Heads), and Laurie Anderson. Young Jean Lee and Future Wife performed the show, We're Gonna Die, with David Byrne at his Meltdown Festival in London (Southbank Centre) in August 2015. The Velvet Underground's Lou Reed described Lee as, "One of the most accomplished, articulate, versatile, and hilarious playwrights, musicians, and artists that we in America have to offer."

== Affiliations ==
Outside her own company, Lee has worked with Radiohole and the National Theater of the United States of America. She is on the board of Yaddo, is a former member of New Dramatists and 13P, and has been awarded residencies from Yaddo, the MacDowell Colony, the Ucross Foundation, Hedgebrook, the Park Avenue Armory, Orchard Project, HERE Arts Center, and Brooklyn Arts Exchange.

Lee is currently the Denning Family Professor in the Arts at Stanford University.

== Publications ==
Theatre Communications Group has published all 11 of Lee's plays in four books: Songs of the Dragons Flying to Heaven and Other Plays; The Shipment and Lear; We're Gonna Die, and Straight White Men/Untitled Feminist Show. Other publications include: Three Plays by Young Jean Lee (Samuel French, Inc.), New Downtown Now (an anthology edited with Mac Wellman), and An Interview with Richard Foreman in American Theatre magazine.

== Awards ==
Lee is the recipient of a Guggenheim Fellowship, two OBIE Awards, a Prize in Literature from the American Academy of Arts and Letters, a PEN Literary Award, a United States Artists Fellowship, the Windham–Campbell Prize, a Doris Duke Performing Artist Award, a Doris Duke Artist Residency, a Foundation for Contemporary Arts Grants to Artists award (2006), and the ZKB Patronage Prize of the Zürcher Theater Spektakel. She has also received funding from the National Endowment for the Arts, the New York State Council on the Arts, the Rockefeller Foundation MAP Fund, the Andrew Mellon Foundation, Creative Capital, the Greenwall Foundation, the Jerome Foundation, the New York Foundation for the Arts, the Arts Presenters/Ford Foundation Creative Capacity Grant, the Barbara Bell Cumming Foundation, and the New England Foundation for the Arts: National Theater Project Award.
