= Sarah Benson =

British director

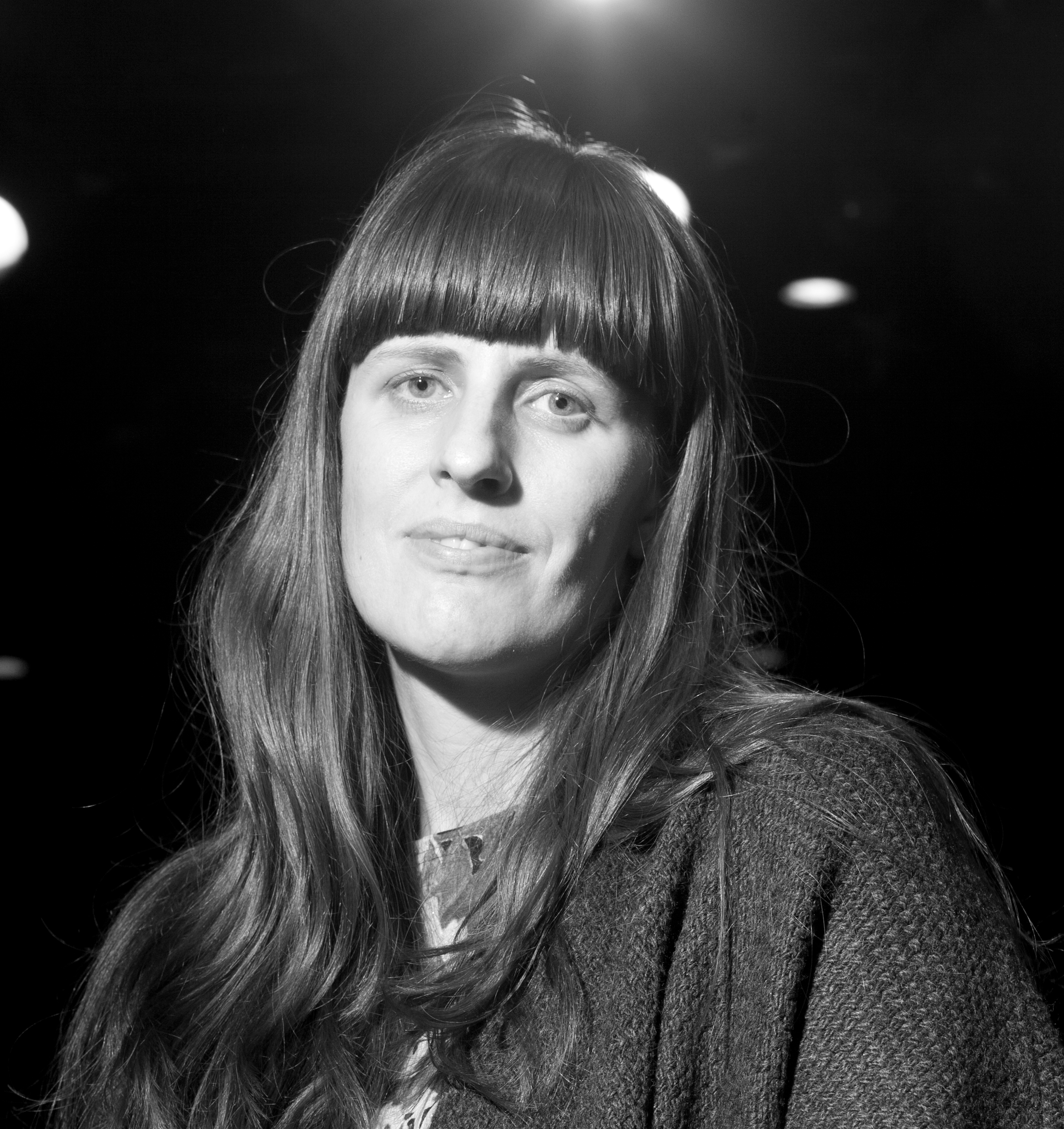
- Born: 1977 or 1978 (age 47–48)
- Education: King's College London; Brooklyn College M.F.A., 2004
- Known for: Theatre director Artistic director of Soho Rep
- Movement: Avant-garde theatre production
- Awards: Fairview 2019 Drama Desk nomination Vilcek award, 2016, Creative promise in theatre Futurity 2015, Lucille Lortel award, Best musical Callaway award Blasted 2009, Obie award Drama Desk nomination
- Website: sohorep.org

Sarah Benson is a British director of avant-garde theatre productions based in New York. As a Director of the Soho Rep, a lower Manhattan-based theatre company with an "audacious taste in plays", she is notable for her "commitment to adventurous new plays with an experimental bent". She has been at the company since 2007, and during her tenure, the company has won numerous Obie awards and Drama Desk nominations.

While Benson specializes in noncommercial work, in 2019 she directed an advertisement starring Michael C. Hall which aired in the 2019 Super Bowl entitled Skittles Commercial: The Broadway Musical to promote a brand of candy; Forbes described it as the "best Super Bowl ad of the year".

When developing a new project, Benson likes to collaborate intensively in the early stages of development with theatrical designers. With actors, she is interested in character and person co-existing in performance rather than character being used exclusively as a mask. Once in rehearsal she stages "really really fast" so she can start "seeing scenes on their feet".

During the worldwide COVID-19 pandemic, when the theatre world was particularly hard hit, Benson and the other directors of Soho Rep, Cynthia Flowers and Meropi Peponides, noticed that many creative people were abandoning the city. They embarked on a plan in September 2020 to put artists on salary.

Benson has also worked with the O'Neill Playwrights Conference, the New York Stage and Film and the New Dramatists. She has mentored students in the theatre programs at New York University and Yale University. She lives in Brooklyn and is a member of the board of trustees of the Brooklyn College Foundation.

== Awards ==
Benson's theatrical work has earned her high plaudits from the community. For her 2008 rendition of Sarah Kane's play Blasted, a piece "famous for its shock value" and which played an extended acclaimed run, Benson won an Obie award and received a Drama Desk nomination. Her production of An Octoroon won an Obie Award for Best New American Play in 2014. Her 2019 production of Fairview received numerous accolades: it won a Pulitzer Prize for best play and Benson was nominated for a Drama Desk Award for her direction. The Vilcek Foundation described her trademarks as "invention and persistence".

== Beginnings ==
Benson grew up in rural England and her father was an engineer who built ship's wheels. She studied English lterature at King's College, London. She had planned on an acting career but eventually moved into directing. She won a Fulbright Scholarship to study in America. She emigrated to the United States and got her master's degree in fine arts in 2004 from the Brooklyn College graduate theatre program. She began an internship at Soho Rep and soon ran the company's Writer/Director Lab; in 2005 she curated the Prelude Festival. She was appointed as Artistic Director of Soho Rep in 2007.

== Reviews ==
New York Times drama critic Ben Brantley described Benson's Fairview as being "directed with disarming smoothness and military precision" and noted Benson's "drama of disruption". He praised her direction of In the Blood, writing that it was directed with "a dangerously relaxing sense of humor". He described her direction of Octoroon as having "great cunning" and her direction of Blasted as being "impeccably staged". Gothamist critic John Del Signore agreed with that assessment, and wrote that her "flawless production succeed(ed) in rendering's Kane's bitter world view with stunning clarity and courage". Her production of Fairview was described by another critic as a "hard-hitting drama that examines race in a highly conceptual, layered structure".

New Yorker critic Hilton Als wrote:

Under her directorship I have never seen a boring production—a very rare thing, indeed. Her deeply individual sensibility is not compromised by needs other than those of the work at hand, and it’s that freedom, structured around shows that I may not agree with but always learn from, that distinguishes the SoHo Rep... Benson has imbued each work with a tough, unsentimental core; she’s also made the plays into distinct visual works that help us see the words.

— Hilton Als in The New Yorker, 2013

== Dramatic productions ==
Year	Title	Role	Venue	Writer	Comments
2024	Teeth	Director	Playwrights Horizons	Michael R. Jackson and Anna K. Jacobs	
2019	Fairview	Director	Soho Rep, Berkeley Rep, Theater for a New Audience	Jackie Sibblies Drury	Pulitzer Prize for Drama 2019; Drama Desk nomination
2017	In The Blood	Director	Signature Theater	Suzan-Lori Parks	
2017	Samara	Director	A.R.T. Theater; Soho Rep production	Richard Maxwell with music by Steve Earle	
2015	Futurity	Director	American Repertory Theater, Walker Arts Center, Connelly Theater; Soho Rep & Ars Nova Production	César Alvarez & The Lisps	Lucille Lortel award for 'Best Musical' Callaway Award
2014/5	Octoroon	Director	Soho Rep, Theater for a New Audience	Dion Boucicault, Branden Jacobs-Jenkins	Obie winner best new American play; Chris Myers, Obie winner for Performance
2013	A Public Reading of an Unproduced Screenplay About the Death of Walt Disney	Director	Soho Rep	Lucas Hnath	Larry Pine, Obie winner for Performance
2011	Elective Affinities	Director	site-specific	David Adjmi	Featured Zoe Caldwell
2008	Blasted	Director	Soho Rep	Sarah Kane	Drama Desk nomination, Obie Award
