= Richard Maxwell (director) =

American stage director and dramatist

- Born: 1967 (age 58–59); New York City, U.S.
- Citizenship: United States
- Occupations: Theater director; playwright

Richard Maxwell (born 1967) is an American experimental theater director and playwright in New York City. He is the artistic director of the New York City Players.

== Life and career ==
Originally from West Fargo, North Dakota, Maxwell began his professional career with the Steppenwolf Theatre Company. While in Chicago, he became a co-founder and director of the Cook County Theater Department.

In 2000, Maxwell received a Foundation for Contemporary Arts Grant to Artists award along with a project grant from Creative Capital. In 2010, Maxwell received a Guggenheim Fellowship and in 2012 received the Doris Duke Performing Artist Award. Also in 2012, Maxwell was an invited artist in the Whitney Biennial.

== Publications ==
- Maxwell, Richard (2004). Plays: 1996-2000. New York: Theatre Communications Group. ISBN 1559362286. OCLC 470079707.
- Maxwell, Richard (2015). Theater for Beginners (1st ed.). New York: Theatre Communications Group. ISBN 9781559364867. OCLC 875240238.
