= Soho Repertory Theatre =

American off-Broadway theater company

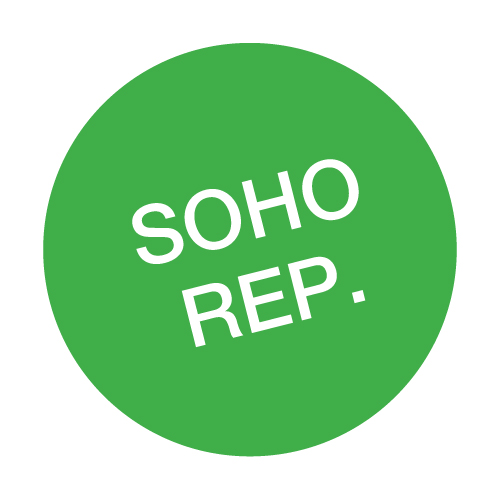
- Formation: June 1, 1975
- Type: Theatre group
- Purpose: Avant-garde theatre
- Location: 416 W 42nd Street New York, NY 10036
- Members: --Directors-- Cynthia Flowers; Caleb Hammons; Eric Ting
- Awards: Fairview 2019 Drama Desk nomination Vilcek award, 2016, Creative promise in theatre Futurity 2015, Lucille Lortel award, Best musical Callaway award Blasted 2009, Obie award Drama Desk nomination
- Website: sohorep.org

The Soho Repertory Theatre, known as Soho Rep, is an American off-Broadway theater company based in New York City which is notable for producing avant-garde plays by contemporary writers. The company, described as a "cultural pillar", is currently located in a 65-seat theatre in the TriBeCa section of lower Manhattan. The company, and the projects it has produced, have won multiple prizes and earned critical acclaim, including numerous Obie Awards, Drama Desk Awards, Drama Critics' Circle Awards, and a Pulitzer Prize. A recent highlight was winning the Drama Desk Award for Sustained Achievement for "nearly four decades of artistic distinction, innovative production, and provocative play selection."

Notable artists who have recently created work at the theater, often early in their careers, include: David Adjmi, César Alvarez, Annie Baker, Alice Birch, Christopher Chen, Jackie Sibblies Drury, debbie tucker green, Aleshea Harris, Lucas Hnath, Branden Jacobs-Jenkins, Daniel Alexander Jones, Young Jean Lee, Richard Maxwell, Nature Theater of Oklahoma and Anne Washburn.

The New York Times has described it as a "safer home for dangerous plays". Critics note the “jaw dropping premieres” and “big plays in a small room” as defining features of the theater’s programming. New Yorker theatre critic Hilton Als wrote about current director Sarah Benson:

Under her directorship I have never seen a boring production—a very rare thing, indeed. Her deeply individual sensibility is not compromised by needs other than those of the work at hand, and it’s that freedom, structured around shows that I may not agree with but always learn from, that distinguishes the SoHo Rep... Benson has imbued each work with a tough, unsentimental core; she’s also made the plays into distinct visual works that help us see the words.

In 2019 the company adopted a shared leadership model. The three Directors of the theater of the company Sarah Benson, Cynthia Flowers, and Meropi Peponides led the theater until Benson and Peponides' departure in 2023.

In 2023, Caleb Hammons and Eric Ting joined Cynthia Flowers as co-directors of the theater.

The company has an annual budget of around $2 million and employs a full-time staff of seven. In 2020, in response to the Covid-19 pandemic, the company put eight artists on salary for the 2020-21 season through the creation of a job creation program titled Project Number One referencing Federal Project Number One.

== History ==
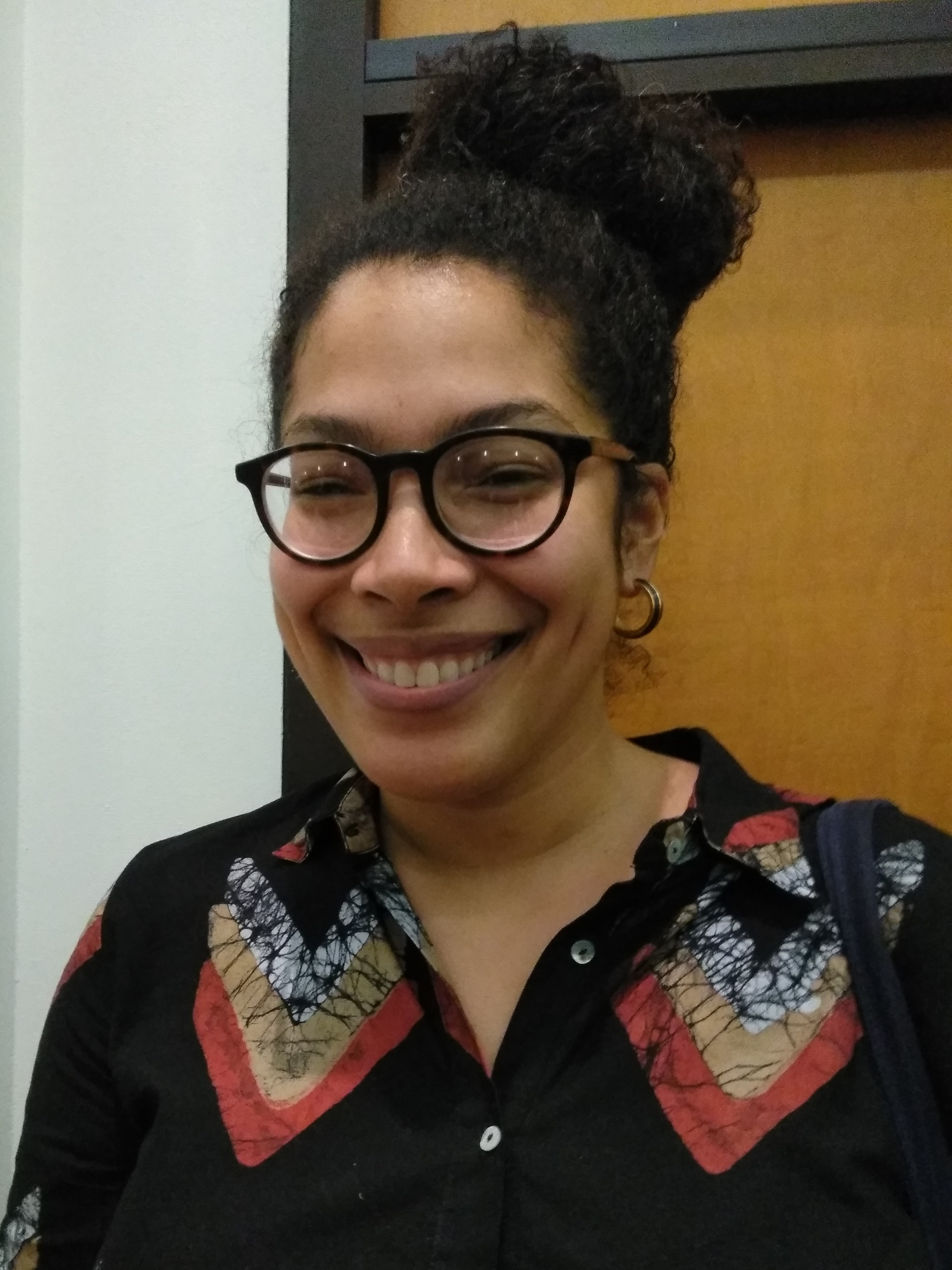
Soho Rep is a favorite venue to launch experimental new plays. Photo: New Jersey-born playwright Jackie Sibblies Drury.

The Soho Repertory Theatre company was founded in 1975 by Jerry Engelbach and Marlene Swartz. From June through September 1975, they remodeled a former textile factory in SoHo. They wanted the space to feel "light and informal" so the audience would feel comfortable. They produced their first play, Maxwell Anderson's Key Largo, on September 25. Their initial focus was on rarely seen classical plays, such as works by Aristophanes, Shakespeare, Molière, Jean Anouilh, Michel de Ghelderode, Eugene O'Neill and Samuel Beckett. By 1979, the company was sometimes producing two shows per night, allowing audiences to see both plays in succession on a Saturday night. The founding duo produced more than a hundred plays until Engelbach left in 1989.

Since its early days, the company's focus has shifted to contemporary avant-garde theatrical works. In 1981, after producing works from Shakespeare to Shaw, the company produced its first new play: Stephen Davis Parks' The Idol Makers. Among the many new works presented were plays by Americans Len Jenkin and Mac Wellman.

After 1989, Swartz partnered with English director Julian Webber, and they worked together for the next decade until Swartz departed in 1999. The company was run by Artistic Director Daniel Aukin from 1998 to 2006, and he produced new work by artists including Adam Bock, Young Jean Lee, Richard Maxwell, Melissa James Gibson, and María Irene Fornés.

Sarah Benson was appointed as Artistic Director in 2007. Around this time, the company transitioned from the smaller off-off-Broadway model of less than 100 seats to an off-Broadway contract, typically reserved for theatres with a 100-499 seat capacity.

Benson and Flowers ran the theater together from 2012 until being joined by Producer Meropi Peponides in 2014. In the last decade the company has taken on ambitious projects often winning awards and critical acclaim. One of Benson's first plays was writer Sarah Kane’s Blasted which won the director an Obie Award. Benson's production of Branden Jacobs-Jenkins's An Octoroon won an Obie for Best New American Play and transferred to Theatre for a New Audience. Taibi Magar's production of Aleshea Harris' 'Is God Is' re-opened Walkerspace in 2018 following renovations and won multiple Obie awards. Benson directed Jackie Sibblies Drury's 'Fairview' which won the 2019 Pulitzer Prize for Drama and had an extended run. The company celebrates with an annual gala usually in the spring, sometimes on a rooftop.

== Performance spaces ==
During the forty-five years of its existence, the theatre has produced in several venues in lower Manhattan, often being forced to move because of issues with rent or city building requirements, and survived from time to time with help from city authorities and supporters. Its first space in 1975 on 19 Mercer Street was in a converted hat warehouse, described by the founders as a "practical adaptation of the Shakespearean playhouse laid out in a modest modern space". In 1985, Bob Moss of Playwrights Horizons, assisted by the mayor's office and a grant from the Manhattan Borough President, helped them relocate to a 100-seat neo-classical theater attached to Bellevue Hospital. While the theatre had a separate entrance from the psychiatric hospital, sometimes backstage their actors and writers rode the same elevator with patients, recalled playwright Mac Wellman. After a year they moved to Greenwich Village, and stayed there until 1991, when they found their present-day space at 46 Walker Street in Tribeca. Dubbed Walkerspace, the present theatre is only a few blocks from the company's original venue. The company has been at this location except for a short period for building renovations, which had been paid for with a fundraising campaign as well as help from the city's building commissioner, Rick Chandler and Julie Menin. In July 2024, Soho Rep announced it would be leaving its longtime home of Walkerspace, citing rising rent costs, lack of accessibility, and the costs of persistent repairs. The company will share space with Playwrights Horizons as it considers long-term plans.

== Staff ==
- Marlene Swartz, Co-Artistic Director (1975–1995)
- Jerry Engelbach, Co-Artistic Director (1975–1989)
- Julian Webber, Co-Artistic Director (1990–1998)
- Daniel Aukin, Artistic Director (1998–2006)
- Sarah Benson,
  - Artistic Director (2007–2019)
  - Director (2019-2023)
- Meropi Peponides
  - Producer (2014–2019)
  - Director (2019-2023)
- Cynthia Flowers
  - Executive Director (2012–2019)
  - Director (2019–present)
- Caleb Hammons
  - Producer (2011–2013)
  - Director (2023–present)
- Eric Ting
  - Director (2023–present)

Since 2019, Soho Rep has used a shared leadership model.

== Dramatic productions ==
Season	Title	Playwright	Director	Awards	Producing Partners
1975–76 (Season 1)	19 Mercer Street				
1975–76 (Season 1)	Key Largo	Maxwell Anderson	Jerry Engelbach		
1975–76 (Season 1)	The Master Builder	Henrik Ibsen	Marlene Swartz		
1975–76 (Season 1)	Coriolanus	William Shakespeare	Jerry Engelbach		
1975–76 (Season 1)	The Congresswomen	Aristophanes, translation and music by William and Billie Snow	Marlene Swartz		
1975–76 (Season 1)	The Infernal Machine	Jean Cocteau	Michael Wright		
1975–76 (Season 1)	Anna Christie	Eugene O'Neill	Marlene Swartz		
1975–76 (Season 1)	Heartbreak House	George Bernard Shaw	Jerry Engelbach		
1975–76 (Season 1)	The Father	August Strindberg, adapted by Jonathan Furst	Jonathan Furst		
1975–76 (Season 1)	Abelard and Eloise	Ronald Duncan	Charles Conwell		
1975–76 (Season 1)	The Imaginary Invalid	Molière, translation by Frances Kosbab	Marlene Swartz		
1975–76 (Season 1)	Bimbos in Paradise	B. Prune	Michael Wright		
1975–76 (Season 1)	Private Lives	Noël Coward	Jack H. Cunningham		
1975–76 (Season 1)	Candida	George Bernard Shaw	Jerry Engelbach		
1976–77 (Season 2)	Six Play Subscription Costs $12				
1976–77 (Season 2)	The Birthday Party	Harold Pinter	Marlene Swartz		
1976–77 (Season 2)	Dracula	Bram Stoker, adapted by Jerry Engelbach	Jerry Engelbach		
1976–77 (Season 2)	Faustus X Seven	Based on "Doctor Faustus," by Christopher Marlowe, adapted by Jerry Engelbach	Carol Corwen and Jerry Engelbach		
1976–77 (Season 2)	The Merchant of Venice	William Shakespeare	Marlene Swartz		
1976–77 (Season 2)	Billy Liar	Keith Waterhouse and Willis Hall	Jerry Engelbach		
1976–77 (Season 2)	Uncle Vanya	Anton Chekhov, adapted by Marlene Swartz	Marlene Swartz		
1976–77 (Season 2)	Spring's Awakening	Frank Wedekind, adapted by Carol Corwen and Mary Eileen O'Donnell	Carol Corwen		
1976–77 (Season 2)	Back to Methuselah	George Bernard Shaw	Stephen R. Lieb		
1976–77 (Season 2)	What the Butler Saw	Joe Orton	Marlene Swartz		
1976–77 (Season 2)	The Dock Brief	John Mortimer	Steven Burch		
1976–77 (Season 2)	The Public Eye	Peter Shaffer	Stephen R. Lieb		
1976–77 (Season 2)	Black Comedy	Peter Shaffer	Frank Cento		
1976–77 (Season 2)	Under Milk Wood	Dylan Thomas	Harrison Ewing		
1976–77 (Season 2)	July 2 and Thanksgiving	Stan Kaplan	Jerry Engelbach		
1976–77 (Season 2)	Rain	John Colton and Clemence Randolph, based on the novel by W. Somerset Maugham	Jack H. Cunningham		
1976–77 (Season 2)	Ghosts	Henrik Ibsen	Marlene Swartz		
1977–78 (Season 3)	Misalliance	George Bernard Shaw	Trueman Kelley		
1977–78 (Season 3)	The Miser	Molière	Moshe Yassur		
1977–78 (Season 3)	Peer Gynt	Henrik Ibsen, adapted by Carol Corwen	Carol Corwen		
1977–78 (Season 3)	The Chairs	Eugène Ionesco	Jon Fraser		
1977–78 (Season 3)	Better Dead	Georges Feydeau, adapted by Jude Schanzer and Michael Wells	Jude Schanzer		
1977–78 (Season 3)	Cyrano DeBergerac	Edmond Rostand	Jerry Engelbach		
1977–78 (Season 3)	Poe in Person, one-man show	Conrad Pomerleau	Conrad Pomerleau		
1977–78 (Season 3)	Traveler Without Luggage	Jean Anouih	Marlene Swartz		
1977–78 (Season 3)	The Play's the Thing	Ferenc Molnár	Jack H. Cunningham		
1977–78 (Season 3)	Mister T	Michael Zettler	Stephen Zuckerman	Featuring Kathleen Turner and Jonathan Frakes	
1977–78 (Season 3)	The Killing of Sister George	Frank Marcus	Marlene Swartz		
1977–78 (Season 3)	The Magistrate	Arthur Wing Pinero	Jim Milton		
1977–78 (Season 3)	The Four Little Girls	Pablo Picasso	Richard Gershman		
1977–78 (Season 3)	The Soho Theatre of the Air, an evening of vintage radio plays	Conceived and Adapted by Carol Corwen	Carol Corwen		
1977–78 (Season 3)	The Real Inspector Hound	Tom Stoppard	Timothy Brennan		
1977–78 (Season 3)	Philadelphia, Here I Come!	Brian Friel	Ron Daley		
1978–79 (Season 4)	One Act Festival Opened Jan 5th, 1979. Cost: $10 for Festival Pass; $3 per show.				
1978–79 (Season 4)	Overruled!	George Bernard Shaw	Gene Santarelli	Villager Downtown Theatre Award for a commitment to the presentation of a program of short plays	
1978–79 (Season 4)	The Love of Don Perimplin and Belisa in the Garden	Federico García Lorca	Mary Ryder	Villager Downtown Theatre Award for a commitment to the presentation of a program of short plays	
1978–79 (Season 4)	Only 10 Minutes to Buffalo	Gunter Grass	Alison Mackenzie	Villager Downtown Theatre Award for a commitment to the presentation of a program of short plays	
1978–79 (Season 4)	Guernica	Fernando Arrabal	Mitchell Engelmeyer	Villager Downtown Theatre Award for a commitment to the presentation of a program of short plays	
1978–79 (Season 4)	Action	Sam Shepard	Chris Silva	Villager Downtown Theatre Award for a commitment to the presentation of a program of short plays	
1978–79 (Season 4)	Deathwatch	Jean Genet	Denise Merat	Villager Downtown Theatre Award for a commitment to the presentation of a program of short plays	
1978–79 (Season 4)	If You Had Three Husbands	Gertrude Stein, adapted by Randy Knolle	Randy Knolle	Villager Downtown Theatre Award for a commitment to the presentation of a program of short plays	
1978–79 (Season 4)	The Twelve-Pound Look	J. M. Barrie	Alison Mackenzie	Villager Downtown Theatre Award for a commitment to the presentation of a program of short plays	
1978–79 (Season 4)	Richard III	William Shakespeare	Jerry Engelbach		
1978–79 (Season 4)	Miss Jairus	Michel DeGhelderode	Carol Corwen		
1978–79 (Season 4)	Dandy Dick	Arthur Wing Pinero	Gene Santarelli		
1978–79 (Season 4)	Inadmissible Evidence	John Osborne	Marlene Swartz		
1978–79 (Season 4)	The Knights of the Round Table	Jean Cocteau	Jerry Engelbach		
1978–79 (Season 4)	Amphitryon 38	Jean Giraudoux	Jude Schanzer		
1978–79 (Season 4)	The Servant	Robin Maugham	Marlene Swartz		
1978–79 (Season 4)	Fallen Angels	Noël Coward	Trueman Kelley		
1978–79 (Season 4)	October 12, 410 B.C. (Thesmophoriazusae)	Aristophanes	Alison Mackenzie		
1978–79 (Season 4)	Requiem for a Heavyweight	Rod Serling	Richard Leighton		
1979–80 (Season 5)	The Insect Comedy	Karel & Joseph Čapek	Trueman Kelley		
1979–80 (Season 5)	The Cannibals	George Tabori	Carol Corwen		
1979–80 (Season 5)	The Barber of Seville	Pierre Beaumarchais	Alison Mackenzie		
1979–80 (Season 5)	We Have Always Lived in the Castle	Hugh Wheeler, from the book by Shirley Jackson	Gene Santarelli		
1979–80 (Season 5)	The Silver Tassie	Séan O'Casey	Carey Perloff		
1979–80 (Season 5)	Twelfth Night	William Shakespeare	Stephen Brant		
1979–80 (Season 5)	The Second Man	S. N. Behrman	Jude Schanzer		
1979–80 (Season 5)	The Life and Death of Tom Thumb the Great	Henry Fielding, music by Anthony Bowles	Anthony Bowles		
1979–80 (Season 5)	Feathertop	From a short story by Nathaniel Hawthorne, adapted by Truman Kelley	Trueman Kelley		
1979–80 (Season 5)	The Ugly Duckling	A. A. Milne	Trueman Kelley		
1979–80 (Season 5)	Brewsie and Willie	Gertrude Stein	Michael Bloom		
1979–80 (Season 5)	Homefires	John Guare	Michael Bloom		
1979–80 (Season 5)	Fairy Tales of New York	J. P. Donleavy	Jerry Engelbach		
1979–80 (Season 5)	The Caretaker	Harold Pinter	Marlene Swartz		
1979–80 (Season 5)	The Gamblers	Nikolai Gogol	Penelope Hirsch		
1979–80 (Season 5)	Old Possum's Book of Practical Cats	T. S. Eliot, adapted for the stage by Jonathan Foster, music by Elyse Goodwin	Jonathan Foster		
1979–80 (Season 5)	The Party	Sławomir Mrożek	N/A		
1979–80 (Season 5)	The Tricycle	Fernando Arrabal	N/A		
1980–81 (Season 6)	Desire Caught by the Tail	Pablo Picasso	Jonathan Foster		
1980–81 (Season 6)	The Idol Makers	Stephen Davis Parks	Marlene Swartz	"Villager Downtown Theatre Award" for Directing	
1980–81 (Season 6)	The Streets of New York, also known as The Poor of New York	Dion Boucicault	Trueman Kelley		
1980–81 (Season 6)	Dark Ride	Len Jenkin	Len Jenkin		
1980–81 (Season 6)	Love in the Country	Book and lyrics by Michael Alfreds, music by Anthony Bowles	Anthony Bowles		
1980–81 (Season 6)	The Doctor and the Devils	Dylan Thomas	Carol Corwen		
1980–81 (Season 6)	Old Times	Harold Pinter	Jerry Engelbach		
1981–82 (Season 7)	The Girl Who Ate Chicken Bones	Book by Stan Kaplan, music by David Hollister, lyrics by Stan Kaplan and David Hollister	Marlene Swartz		
1981–82 (Season 7)	One-Act Operas: The Audience; Mr. Lion; Miyako	Libretto by Glenn Miller, music by Royce Dembo	Scott Clugstone		Golden Fleece Ltd.
1981–82 (Season 7)	One-Act Operas: The Audience; Mr. Lion; Miyako	Music and libretto by Linder Chlarson	Lou Rodgers		Golden Fleece Ltd.
1981–82 (Season 7)	One-Act Operas: The Audience; Mr. Lion; Miyako	Lou Rodgers	Lou Rodgers		Golden Fleece Ltd.
1981–82 (Season 7)	Nathan the Wise	Gotthold Ephraim Lessing	Jerry Engelbach		
1981–82 (Season 7)	Subject to Fits	Robert Montgomery, based on Dostoevsky's The Idiot	Barry Koron		
1981–82 (Season 7)	Barbarians	Barrie Keeffe	Peter Byrne	Featured Kevin Spacey	
1982–83 (Season 8)	Fanshen	David Hare	Michael Bloom		
1982–83 (Season 8)	Kid Twist	Len Jenkin	Tony Barsha		
1982–83 (Season 8)	Rape Upon Rape	Henry Fielding	Anthony Bowles		
1983–84 (Season 9)	Under the Gaslight	Augustin Daly	Stephen Wyman		
1983–84 (Season 9)	Mandrake	Book and lyrics by Michael Alfreds, music by Anthony Bowles	Anthony Bowles		
1983–84 (Season 9)	Catchpenny Twist	Stewart Parker, music by Shaun Davey	Marlene Swartz		
1983–84 (Season 9)	The Wood Painting	Ingmar Bergman	Alan Wynroth		
1983–84 (Season 9)	Yes is for a Very Young Man	Gertrude Stein	Robert P. Barron		
1983–84 (Season 9)	The Business of Good Government	John Arden	Jerry Engelbach		
1983–84 (Season 9)	Bertha, Queen of Norway	Kenneth Koch	Steven Brant		
1983–84 (Season 9)	George Washington Crosses the Delaware	Kenneth Koch	Steven Brant		
1983–84 (Season 9)	The Dwarfs	Harold Pinter	Jerry Engelbach		
1983–84 (Season 9)	Lenz	Mike Stott, based on a fragment by Georg Büchner	N/A		
1984–85 (Season 10)	Theater moves to Bellevue Hospital in January 1985				
1984–85 (Season 10)	The Crimes of Vautrin	Nicholas Wright, based on the novel by Honoré de Balzac: Splendeurs et Miseresdes Courtisanes	Carol Corwen		
1984–85 (Season 10)	Energumen	Mac Wellman	Rebecca Harrison		
1984–85 (Season 10)	Almos' A Man	Paris Barclay, based on Richard Wright's short story, The Man Who Was Almost a Man	Tazewell Thompson		
1984–85 (Season 10)	The Winter's Tale	William Shakespeare	Anthony Bowles		
1985–86 (Season 11)	Theater moves to Greenwich House, 27 Barrow Street				
1985–86 (Season 11)	The Two Orphans	Cormon and D'Ennery (Les deux orphelines), original music by Marshall Coid	Julian Webber		
1985–86 (Season 11)	One Fine Day	Nicholas Wright	Tazewell Thompson		
1985–86 (Season 11)	The Grub Street Opera	Henry Fielding, new music by Anthony Bowles	Anthony Bowles		
1986–87 (Season 12)	The Ragged Trousered Philanthropists	Stephen Lowe	Julian Webber		
1986–87 (Season 12)	Sergeant Ola and his Followers	David Lan	Tazewell Thompson		
1986–87 (Season 12)	The Mock Doctor	Henry Fielding, music by Anthony Bowles	Anthony Bowles		
1986–87 (Season 12)	Eurydice	Henry Fielding, music by Anthony Bowles	Anthony Bowles		
1987–88 (Season 13)	The Racket	Bartlett Cormack	Michael Bloom		
1987–88 (Season 13)	The Girl of the Golden West	David Belasco	Julian Webber		
1987–88 (Season 13)	A Cup of Coffee	Preston Sturges	Larry Carpenter		
1988–89 (Season 14)	The Blitzstein Project	Marc Blitzstein	Carol Corwen		
1988–89 (Season 14)	The Phantom Lady	Pedro Calderón de la Barca, translated by Edwin Honig	Julian Webber		
1988–89 (Season 14)	The Cezanne Syndrome	Normand Canac-Marquis, translated by Louison Denis	N/A		
1989–90 (Season 15)	Limbo Tales	Len Jenkin	Thomas Babe		
1989–90 (Season 15)	American Bagpipes	Iain Heggie	Julian Webber		
1990–91 (Season 16)	Theater is established at 46 Walker Street Julian Webber is hired as Co-Artistic Director (with Marlene Swartz)				
1990–91 (Season 16)	Native Speech	Eric Overmyer	John Pynchon Holms		
1990–91 (Season 16)	Yokohama Duty	Quincy Long	Julian Webber		
1990–91 (Season 16)	Two Gentlemen of Verona	William Shakespeare, adapted by Mark Milbauer and David Becker	Mark Milbauer and David Becker		Cucaracha Theatre
1990–91 (Season 16)	Hanging the President	Michele Celeste			
1991–92 (Season 17)	7 Blowjobs	Mac Wellman	Jim Simpson		
1991–92 (Season 17)	Tone Clusters	Joyce Carol Oates	Julian Webber		
1992–93 (Season 18)	Three Americanisms	Mac Wellman	Jim Simpson		
1992–93 (Season 18)	Cross Dressing in the Depression	Erin Cressida Wilson			
1992–93 (Season 18)	Mormons in Malibu	Wendy Hammond			
1993–94 (Season 19)	David's Red-Haired Death	Sherry Kramer			
1993–94 (Season 19)	Terminal Hip	Mac Wellman			
1993–94 (Season 19)	Careless Love	Len Jenkin			
1993–94 (Season 19)	Dracula	Mac Wellman	Julian Webber	featured Tim Blake Nelson	
1993–94 (Season 19)	Hollywood Hustle	written and performed by Jeremiah Bosgang	Rob Greenberg		
1993–94 (Season 19)	Exchange	Yuri Trifonov, translated and adapted by Michael Frayn	Peter Westerhoff		
1993–94 (Season 19)	Swoop	Mac Wellman	Julian Webber		
1993–94 (Season 19)	Women Behind Bars	Tom Eyen			
1994–95 (Season 20)	The House of Yes	Wendy MacLeod			
1994–95 (Season 20)	Skin	Naomi Iizuka			
1994–95 (Season 20)	Frank, Frank				
1994–95 (Season 20)	Titus Andronicus	William Shakespeare	Lester Shane		
1994–95 (Season 20)	Measure for Measure	William Shakespeare	Jared Hammond		
1995–96 (Season 21)	Dark Ride (revival of 1981 production)	Len Jenkin	Julian Webber		
1995–96 (Season 21)	Wally's Ghost	Ain Gordon		OBIE, Playwriting	
1997–98 (Season 23)	A Devil Inside	David Lindsay-Abaire	Julian Webber		
1997–98 (Season 23)	Fnu Lnu	Mac Wellman, original music by David Van Tieghem	Julian Webber		
1997–98 (Season 23)	How to Write While You Sleep	Madeleine Olnek	Lisa Portes		
1998–99 (Season 24)	Cowboys and Indians	Richard Maxwell and Jim Strahs	Richard Maxwell		
1998–99 (Season 24)	Quartet	Heiner Müller			
1998–99 (Season 24)	The Escapist	The Flying Machine			
1998–99 (Season 24)	Alice's Evidence	Ellen Beckerman			
1999–2000 (Season 25)	R&D: Research & Development	new work development series featuring Mac Wellman, Richard Maxwell, and Maria Shron			
1999–2000 (Season 25)	The Year of the Baby	Quincy Long, composed by Maury Loeb, based on a play by Stephen Foster	Daniel Aukin		
1999–2000 (Season 25)	Hypatia	Mac Wellman	Bob McGrath		
2000–01 (Season 26)	Cat's-Paw	Mac Wellman	Daniel Aukin		
2000–01 (Season 26)	Caveman	Richard Maxwell	Richard Maxwell		
2000–01 (Season 26)	Boxing 2000	Richard Maxwell			
2001–02 (Season 27)	[sic]	Melissa James Gibson	Daniel Aukin	OBIE, Playwriting OBIE, Special Citation, Direction OBIE, Special Citation, Set Design	
2001–02 (Season 27)	Attempts On Her Life	Martin Crimp	Steve Cosson		
2002–03 (Season 28)	Signals of Distress	created and performed by members of the Flying Machine; adapted by Joshua Carlebach from the novel by Jim Crace	Joshua Carlebach		
2002–03 (Season 28)	Molly's Dream	María Irene Fornés	Daniel Aukin	OBIE, Special Citation	
2003–04 (Season 29)	Suitcase, or Those That Resemble Flies from a Distance	Melissa James Gibson	Daniel Aukin		True Love Productions
2003–04 (Season 29)	The Appeal	Young Jean Lee	Young Jean Lee		
2004–05 (Season 30)	Everything Will Be Different (later retitled A Brief History of Helen of Troy)	Mark Schultz	Daniel Aukin		
2004–05 (Season 30)	Frankenstein	adapted by Joshua Carlebach from the novel by Mary Shelley	Joshua Carlebach		
2005–06 (Season 31)	Not Clown	Carlos Treviño and Steve Moore	Carlos Treviño		
2005–06 (Season 31)	Peninsula	Madelyn Kent	Madelyn Kent		
2006–07 (Season 32)	Thugs	Adam Bock	Anne Kauffman	OBIE, Playwriting OBIE, Ross Wetzsteon Award	
2007–08 (Season 33)	Sarah Benson begins tenure as Artistic Director Soho Rep. begins producing under Off-Broadway Equity Contract				
2007–08 (Season 33)	Philoktetes	John Jesurun, adapted from Sophocles' original	John Jesurun		
2007–08 (Season 33)	No Dice	Nature Theater of Oklahoma		OBIE, Special Citation	
2008–09 (Season 34)	Blasted	Sarah Kane	Sarah Benson	OBIE, Special Citation, Direction OBIE, Special Citation, Set Design, Drama Desk nomination	
2008–09 (Season 34)	Sixty Miles to Silver Lake	Dan LeFranc	Anne Kauffman	New York Times Outstanding Playwright Award	
2008–09 (Season 34)	Rambo Solo	conceived by Pavol Liska and Kelly Copper in conversation with Zachary Oberzan	Pavol Liska and Kelly Copper		Nature Theater of Oklahoma
2009–10 (Season 35)	Lear	Young Jean Lee, adapted from King Lear by William Shakespeare, choreographed by Dean Moss	Young Jean Lee		
2009–10 (Season 35)	The Truth: A Tragedy	written, composed, and performed by Cynthia Hopkins	DJ Mendel		
2010–11 (Season 36)	Orange, Hat & Grace	Gregory Moss	Sarah Benson		
2010–11 (Season 36)	Jomama Jones * Radiate	performed by Daniel Alexander Jones, music direction by Bobby Halvorson	Kym Moore		
2010–11 (Season 36)	born bad	debbie tucker green	Leah C. Gardiner	OBIE, Special Citation, Playwriting OBIE, Special Citation, Directing	
2011–12 (Season 37)	Elective Affinities	David Adjmi	Sarah Benson	Featured Zoe Caldwell	Piece by Piece Productions and Rising Phoenix Repertory
2011–12 (Season 37)	The Ugly One	Marius von Mayenburg	Daniel Aukin		The Play Company, John Adrian Selzer
2011–12 (Season 37)	Uncle Vanya	Annie Baker, adapted from Anton Chekhov's original	Sam Gold		John Adrian Selzer
2012–13 (Season 38)	We Are Proud to Present a Presentation About the Herero of Namibia, Formerly Known as South West Africa, from the German Sudwestafrika Between the Years 1884–1915	Jackie Sibblies Drury	Eric Ting	OBIE, Direction	John Adrian Selzer
2012–13 (Season 38)	Life and Times, Episodes 1–4	conceived by Pavol Liska and Kelly Copper in conversation with Kristin Worrall	Pavol Liska and Kelly Copper	OBIE, Special Citation	Nature Theater of Oklahoma, Burgtheater in Vienna, The Public Theater, John Adrian Selzer
2012–13 (Season 38)	A Public Reading of an Unproduced Screenplay About the Death of Walt Disney	Lucas Hnath	Sarah Benson	OBIE, Performance (Larry Pine)	John Adrian Selzer
2013–14 (Season 39)	Marie Antionette	David Adjmi	Rebecca Taichman		John Adrian Selzer, American Repertory Theater, Yale Repertory Theater
2013–14 (Season 39)	An Octoroon	Branden Jacobs-Jenkins; songs, score, and musical direction by César Alvarez, choreography by David Neumann	Sarah Benson	OBIE, Performance (Chris Myers) OBIE, Best New American Play	John Adrian Selzer
2014–15 (Season 40)	generations	debbie tucker green	Leah C. Gardiner		The Play Company, John Adrian Selzer
2014–15 (Season 40)	Winners and Losers	created and performed by Marcus Youssef and James Long	Chris Abraham		
2014–15 (Season 40)	10 out of 12	Anne Washburn	Les Waters		John Adrian Selzer
2015–16 (Season 41)	FUTURITY	lyrics and book by César Alvarez, music by César Alvarez with The Lisps	Sarah Benson	Lortel Award, Outstanding Musical	Carole Shorenstein Hays, Ars Nova
2015–16 (Season 41)	Revolt. She Said. Revolt Again.	Alice Birch	Lileana Blain-Cruz		John Adrian Selzer
2016–17 (Season 42)	Duat	Daniel Alexander Jones, with new music by Samora Pinderhughes, Bobby Halvorson, and Jomama Jones	Will Davis		
2016–17 (Season 42)	[untitled new play]	Jackie Sibblies Drury	Sarah Benson		
2016–17 (Season 42)	In The Blood	Suzan-Lori Parks	Sarah Benson		
2016–17 (Season 42)	Samara	Richard Maxwell, with original music by Steve Earle	Sarah Benson		John Adrian Selzer
2017–18 (Season 43)	Is God Is	Aleshea Harris	Taibi Magar	American Playwriting Foundation Relentless Award 2016	
2017–18 (Season 43)	[studio]	Alice Birch, Narcissister, Carmelita Tropicana and Branden Jacobs-Jenkins, Kate Tarker, Becca Blackwell			
2017–18 (Season 43)	Fairview	Jackie Sibblies Drury	Sarah Benson	Pulitzer Prize for Drama 2019; Drama Desk nomination	
2018–19 (Season 44)	Thunderbodies	Kate Tarker	Lileana Blain-Cruz		
2018–19 (Season 44)	Passage	Christopher Chen	Saheem Ali		
2019–20 (Season 45)	for all the women who thought they were Mad	Zawe Ashton	Whitney White		
2021–22 (Season 46)	while you were partying	Julia Mounsey & Peter Mills Weiss			
2021–22 (Season 46)	Wolf Play	Hansol Jung	Dustin Wills		
2021–22 (Season 46)	Notes on Killing Seven Oversight, Management and Economic Stability Board Members	Mara Vélez Meléndez	David Mendizábal		
2022–23 (Season 47)	Montag	Kate Tarker, with original music by Daniel Schlossberg	Dustin Wills		
2022–23 (Season 47)	Public Obscenities	Shayok Misha Chowdhury	Shayok Misha Chowdhury	Finalist for the 2024 Pulitzer Prize for Drama	
2022–23 (Season 47)	The Whitney Album	Jillian Walker	Jenny Koons		
2023-2024	Snatch Adams & Tainty McCracken Present It’s That Time of the Month	Becca Blackwell & Amanda Duarte	Jess Barbagallo		
2023-2024	The Fires	Raja Feather Kelly	Raja Feather Kelly		
2024-2025	Give Me Carmelita Tropicana!	Alina Troyano & Branden Jacobs-Jenkins	Eric Ting		
2024-2025	SOHO REP IS NOT A BUILDING. SOHO REP HAD A BUILDING…	Various writers including David Adjmi, Fred Basch, Jackie Sibblies Drury, Lucas Hnath, Branden Jacobs-Jenkins, Kate Tarker, Shayok Misha Chowdhury, Young Jean Lee, Amanda Spooner, Louisa Thompson, and Peter Mills Weiss			
2024-2025	The Great Privation (How to flip ten cents into a dollar)	Nia Akilah Robinson	Evren Odcikin		
2024-2025	Prince Faggot	Jordan Tannahill	Shayok Misha Chowdhury		
