= Jenny Schlenzka =

Artistic director of New York Performance Nonprofit

Jenny Schlenzka is a Berlin-born curator of time-based art, currently serving as Executive Artistic Director at Performance Space New York (formerly PS 122). Schlenzka was the first full-time curator dedicated to performance art at The Museum of Modern Art and established the Sunday Sessions program at MoMA PS1. In March 2023, she was selected to become the director of Berlin's Martin-Gropius-Bau, effective September 2023.

== Education ==
Schlenzka received her Master's in Cultural Studies 2007 from Humboldt University of Berlin, during which she studied at NYU’s School of Arts and Sciences.

== Career ==
=== At MoMA and MoMA PS1 (2006–2017) ===
After completing her Master’s, Schlenzka became the liaison between the Berlin-based institution The KW Institute for Contemporary Art and MoMA PS1 in New York.

In 2008 Schlenzka was appointed to the role of Assistant Curator for Performance at MoMA. She held this position from 2008-2012, during which she co-organized the Performance Exhibition Series together with Klaus Biesenbach, featuring artists such as Allora & Calzadilla, Simone Fortif, Tehching Hsieh, Xavier Le Roy, Roman Ondák, Anne Teresa De Keersmaeker, Ralph Lemon, Trisha Brown, Alison Knowles, Yvonne Rainer, Grand Openings, and others.

In 2012, alongside choreographer and Guest Curator Ralph Lemon, Schlenzka organized the three-week program Some sweet day. Through efforts led by Biesenbach and Schlenzka, MoMA began acquiring works of performance, among the first of which were pieces by Tino Sehgal and Roman Ondák. Schlenzka became Associate Curator of MoMA PS1, where she was in charge of the museum’s live programs. Schlenzka founded the weekly live interdisciplinary program Sunday Sessions, which over the years featured hundreds of artists, performers, and more, among them Genesis Breyer P-Orridge, Rosa Barba, Annie Dorsen, Lynn Hershman Leeson, Andre Lepecki, Juliana Huxtable, Mette Ingvartsen, Sarah Ortmeyer, Adam Pendleton, Peggy Phelan, Sondra Perry, William Pope.L, Terre Thaemlitz, Underground Resistance, Vogue’ology Collective, Wu-Tang Clan; for this series, Schlenzka commissioned work from Hannah Black, Trajal Harrell, Ragnar Kjartansson, Mårten Spångberg, Anne Imhof, Matthew Lutz Kinoy, and Tobias Madison.

Schlenzka at PS1 expanded on the idea of presenting live art via exhibition, with the Xavier Le Roy exhibit Retrospective (2014) and Anne Imhof: DEAL.

=== At Performance Space New York (since 2017) ===
In January 2017, PS 122 announced that Schlenzka would step in as Executive Artistic Director. Under her new leadership, the organization—whose name previously stood for Performance Space 122—was renamed Performance Space New York, "signaling an ambition to be relevant and accessible to all of New York,” as Schlenzka described. Initial seasons under Schlenzka’s direction were organized within themes, providing “a way in” for those newer to the institution and to performance.

Schlenzka organized a themed series around the organization’s history within its neighborhood, the East Village, reflecting, as The New York Times described, “on forces that have shaped them: gentrification, the AIDS epidemic, and punk and club culture.” Schlenzka included the revival of Ishmael Houston Jones, Chris Cochrane, and Dennis Cooper’s THEM. Others included in the inaugural series were the Lenape Center (in the space's re-opening event, featuring Indigenous artists and leaders), a focus on Kathy Acker, Women’s History Museum, Diamanda Galás, Sarah Michelson, Tiona Nekkia McClodden, Penny Arcade, BRUJAS, and Alliance for Positive Change.

As Performance Space New York turned 40, Schlenzka, with the artist Sarah Michelson, conceived a year-long artist takeover of the institution’s programming. 02020, as it was called, saw Performance Space New York turning its full annual production budget over to a cohort of artists. Schlenzka and Michelson wrote, in a joint letter:

For the year of 2020 a group of NYC-based artists and collectives has been given the mandate to run the organization together with our staff, board, and leadership…The only requirement of their tenure is that the spaces must be utilized…Shifting our model is shifting our future: toward new institutional structures, new coalitions, new partnerships, new priorities. We know artistic practice is changing, that the world is changing, and that we need to be ready to adjust. We are betting on an artist-recalibrated institutional mission as a catalyst for futurist art practice.

Schlenzka worked with artists from the 02020 cohort, with the institutional board, and community members to formulate a new mission statement for Performance Space New York; and has pushed for the organization’s board to include at least 50% artists.

== Awards ==
Jenny Schlenzka is a 2012 recipient of the Yoko Ono Courage Award for the Arts.
