= Social studies of marketing =

Interdisciplinary area

The social study of marketing is an interdisciplinary area of social science. It combines perspectives from anthropology, economic sociology, science and technology studies, and cultural studies to study consumption. Work in the area emphasizes the social and cultural dimensions of marketing practices but focuses also on technical and historical issues that have shaped contemporary consumer markets. Its emergence follows similar developments in social studies of finance. But it is also seen as response to mainstream marketing management research which focuses on marketing as a series of tools and techniques devoid of social interactions.

The term "social studies of marketing" was first used to refer to a body of marketing theories by the economic sociologist Fabian Muniesa in his book Provoked Economy. He writes:

'The emerging field of the social studies of marketing ... can be defined as having a shared interest in how specialties such as marketing, market research, branding and advertising shape (purposeful, most of the time) the things they target – specifically consumers. ... Of course, this does not mean that consumers do not exist and that marketing is a fiction' (2014: 32).

Theoretically, the main discussions in the area centre on questions of agency and representation. Dealing with questions of agency, and informed by actor–network theory, many discussion explore the ways that seemingly trivial material objects such as shopping bags, carts and trolleys and retail displays fundamentally shape how people consume. Accepting that these objects can influence what people buy has led researchers to question dominant views of consumers as sovereign decision makers that are more typical in studies of consumer markets. Dealing with representation, work in the area argues that the main task of marketing is to describe markets. The notion of performativity has emerged as a key concept here. It tells us that marketing practices which supposedly measure consumer behaviours can also be said to produce them. This has led the area to engage in philosophical discussions in particular critical realism and social constructionism. The latter suggests that all reality – including consumer behaviour – is made up or constructed through representations. They former, says that there is an underlying real world, even if marketers base their decisions only on limited representation of that real world.

Authors who have contributed to this area are predominantly based on Europe and North America. They include prominent sociologists such as Michel Callon and business researchers such as Araujo; Zwick; Pollock; Mason; and Schwartzkopf.
