= Caroline Levine =

American literary critic (born 1970)

Professor Caroline Levine MAPS
- Born: December 12, 1970 (age 55); Syracuse, New York
- Years active: 1996–present
- Title: David and Kathleen Ryan Professor of Humanities

Academic background
- Education: Princeton University (A.B.); Birkbeck, University of London (DPhil)

Academic work
- Discipline: Comparative literature English studies Cultural studies
- School or tradition: Birmingham School (Note: "The Birmingham school is part of my worldview....But where I was never a good Birmingham acolyte was around form[.]" -Levine)
- Institutions: Wake Forest University; Rutgers University–Camden; University of Wisconsin–Madison; Cornell University; School of Criticism and Theory; Harvard Radcliffe Institute
- Main interests: World literature New Formalism (critical movement); Formalism (literature); Sociology of art Environmental humanities Victorian studies
- Notable works: Forms: Whole, Rhythm, Hierarchy, Network (2015) (Note: Turkish translation: Biçimler: Bütün, Ritim, Hiyerarşi, Ağ. Istanbul: Koç Üniversitesi Yayınları, 2017.; Korean translation: 『형식들: 전체, 리듬, 위계, 네트워크』. Paju Book City: 아카넷, 2021.); The Activist Humanist: Form and Method in the Climate Crisis (2023)

Caroline Levine (born 1970) is an American scholar and literary critic. She is the David and Kathleen Ryan Professor of Humanities at Cornell University.

== Early life and education ==
Levine was born in 1970 in Syracuse, New York. Her father, Joseph M. Levine (1933–2008), was a Distinguished Professor at Syracuse University, specializing in the intellectual history of early modern England. Her brother, Peter, is a political philosopher and political scientist at Tufts University.

Levine earned her A.B. from Princeton University in 1992, choosing Comparative Literature as a major because she disliked the nationalist history approach to English literature. (Note: "I chose comparative literature as an undergraduate because I didn't like the nationalist history ... It never seemed to me that a history of English literature made sense as such. And there are a bunch of histories—from history departments, history of science, art history, literary history, music history. How do we think about them together?" -Levine) She moved to England for graduate work, earning her DPhil in English at Birkbeck College, University of London in 1996. She has said that her training there was influenced by the questions of British cultural studies. (Note: "I was trained in England, at University of London ... I read and talked to lots of people who were grappling with the questions of cultural studies. I think almost all problems are political, or at least there are not many questions that people care passionately about that don't have something to do with larger questions of how we live together." -Levine)

She is unrelated to Victorian literature scholar George Levine.

== Career ==
Levine assumed her position as David and Kathleen Ryan Professor of the Humanities at Cornell University in 2016, and she was the Picket Family Chair of the English Department from 2018 to 2021. Prior to her work at Cornell, Levine taught at the University of Wisconsin–Madison from 2002 to 2016 and was chair of the English Department from 2013 to 2016. She held previous appointments in the English Department at Rutgers University–Camden (1998–2002) and Wake Forest University (1997–1998).

Levine's published works are in the fields of literary theory, cultural studies, Victorian literature, environmental humanities, narrative theory, world literature, and infrastructure studies.

Levine has published twenty academic articles on Victorian literature, including four articles on George Eliot, four articles on Elizabeth Barrett Browning, two articles on John Ruskin, as well as articles on Charlotte Brontë, Charles Dickens, Wilkie Collins, John Clare, Elizabeth Gaskell, and Henry Mayhew. She has said her interest in the Victorian period began with its interest in collectives, such as the "shared utterance" in poems by Alfred Lord Tennyson or Elizabeth Barrett Browning. (Note: "[L]ooking back, I think I was drawn to the Victorian period in the first place for its interest in collectives. Tennyson's "Lotos-Eaters" (1832) and Elizabeth Barrett Browning's "Cry of the Children" (1843) refuse the solitary subject of Romantic lyric in favour of the shared utterance. The nineteenth-century British novel, too, enmeshes the self in the context of groups and institutions." -Levine)

Levine is the nineteenth-century editor for the Norton Anthology of World Literature, a role she views as essential to democratizing literature. She also co-founded the Mellon World Literatures Workshop at the University of Wisconsin-Madison.

=== Shift to Climate Activism and Public Humanism ===
Levine is an activist and public intellectual working to address climate change and sustainability. In the course of her career, she has retooled formalist methods to address the climate crisis. She has acknowledged this professional shift, noting that the values she now advocates for (e.g., stability, predictability, and continuity) are values she had rejected in her first three books, all of which ended with a focus on open-endedness. (Note: "I started revaluing stability, predictability, and continuity. And these are all values I spent my whole professional life rejecting. My three earlier books all end with open-endedness." -Levine)

While traditional literary criticism often prizes "anti-instrumentality"—the idea that art should be studied for its own sake rather than for a practical goal—Levine argues that the climate crisis has made this kind of over-analysis a luxury human beings can no longer afford. She has moved from the analysis of fictional worlds to the active engineering of the real one through policy, divestment, and collective organizing. While some literary experts spend their time debating the "hidden meanings" or "ambiguity" of a book, Levine uses her expertise in "forms" (Note: "In literary studies, the word form typically refers to the patterns, shapes, and structures that organize literary texts, such as plot and metre. I deliberately define form more broadly than that—as any shape or configuration of materials, any arrangement of elements, any ordering or patterning (Levine, Forms 1–6). Politics, according to this definition, is very much a matter of form." -Levine) to move away from just discussing ideas and toward pushing for practical solutions like stronger labor unions and better laws conducive to systemic environmental change. Recent work by Levine includes an article concerning the necessity for fixed, reliable, and egalitarian clean water pathways for the survival of the indigent amid the climate crisis.

Levine still considers herself a literary critic because she uses the methodological tools of her training and researches historical conditions, analyzing the artfulness of how social worlds are designed. She moves fluidly between nineteenth-century literature and modern climate policy because she sees both through the lens of form. (Note: "I have become convinced, then, that the formalist methods taught to literary critics can be used to analyze social forms. As neoliberal economics and rising global temperatures threaten the most basic means of survival, I have used my own formalist training to identify just and sustaining forms of collective life, such as public housing and transportation, food security systems, and egalitarian waterways." -Levine) Levine is willing to challenge the norms of her profession and has called for a "different literary studies" that's unafraid to be "tormented" by global crises and take direct action. (Note: "I am interested in building a different literary studies, one willing to move back and forth between knowledge and action, one keen to analyze and undertake political movements, and one that will sustain us—and literary studies itself—into the distant future. Care to join me?" -Levine) She is a member of TIAA-Divest and Citizens Climate Lobby and was a leader in the successful effort to make Cornell University divest from fossil fuels.

Levine has discussed her hands-on local activist work on college campuses, which she believes are full of students at major turning points in their lives–moments when people are naturally more open to taking on new civic responsibilities. To tap into this, she has helped develop online sustainability modules at Cornell University for incoming first-year students. These modules educate students on local infrastructure and explicitly ask them to name three existing campus climate organizations they may wish to join. Levine encourages campus tracking where students, whom she characterizes as foot soldiers, join existing efforts and commit to collective work. (Note: "[W]e just need a lot of foot soldiers. We just need a lot of people stuffing envelopes or whatever the contemporary equivalent of that is. If it's not stuffing envelopes, it's posting on social media or organizing town halls or whatever it is. We need a lot of people just doing the grunt work of showing up." -Levine)

Levine was awarded a fellowship at the Harvard Radcliffe Institute, a nine-month residency that runs from September 2026 through May 2027. During this time, she is expected to be in residence in Cambridge to engage with her cohort. Her research during the fellowship will focus on theories of power and agency specifically in the context of the climate crisis. She was elected to the American Philosophical Society in 2026 and will be formally inducted in November 2026.

== Personal life ==
Levine was previously married to the American scholar Professor Jon McKenzie, Director of StudioLab and Professor of Practice at Cornell University, whom she has described as the most serious pleasure in her life.

Levine has two sons, as well as a daughter whom she has characterized as a radical and a Marxist. (Note: "I did have the experience of telling my radical daughter about it, and she was like, 'no, money is evil.' She's a Marxist[.]" -Levine)

She has spent time traveling in the Moroccan countryside, where she observed how local villages traditionally manage and share river irrigation. (Note: "I spent some time in Morocco and in the countryside. A lot of Moroccan villages will divide up access to the river by times of the day in times of the year, so everybody gets equal access, for example.")

In terms of politics, Levine has firmly aligned her identity and goals with the broader left. She has emphasized that her core commitment is finding practical strategies to achieve economic equality, distribute resources fairly, and organize collective action to fight crises like climate change. She has said that she does not, however, fit into traditional Marxist frameworks. (Note: "Marxism was also always not quite satisfying to me[.]...I've had a lot of trouble being a full-blooded Marxist." -Levine)

Levine maintains a close personal friendship with the Marxist theorist and critic Professor Anna Kornbluh (University of Illinois-Chicago), describing her as her best interlocutor. (Note: Anna Kornbluh ... [is] my good friend ... She's the best kind of interlocutor for me")

== Notable works ==
Levine's first monograph, The Serious Pleasures of Suspense: Victorian Realism and Narrative Doubt (2003), was an interdisciplinary literary study that began as doctoral research, funded by a British Marshall Commission fellowship. Levine argued that narrative suspense functioned as a corollary to the scientific method. Drawing on nineteenth-century philosophy of science, she claimed that both novelists and scientists relied on the "doubtful pause"—a rigorous suspension of judgment required to test hypotheses before asserting truth. By inviting readers to speculate while withholding immediate resolution, suspenseful plots in Victorian novels served as a form of epistemological training, democratizing the 'don't-believe-it-until-you-see-the-proof' mindset that was central to Victorian realism. Levine primarily focused on Jane Eyre by Charlotte Brontë, Great Expectations by Charles Dickens, The Moonstone by Wilkie Collins, and The Picture of Dorian Gray by Oscar Wilde to demonstrate her argument.

Levine's second monograph, Provoking Democracy: Why We Need the Arts (2007), was spurred by contemporary culture wars and legal battles over art funding and obscenity. Levine set out to use her expertise in narrative theory to explain why public outrages were a sign of health for democracy rather than a sign of its decay. She argued that the avant-garde and provocative art are not a threat to democracy but a functional necessity for it, reframing starving artists and transgressive artists as democratic heroes whose role is to protect the public sphere from conformity. Rebutting the idea that art should reflect the will of the majority, she claimed that democracy requires art that challenges, shocks, and unsettles mainstream values. Provoking Democracy is less about one time period than about how the idea of the rebellious artist survived and evolved across different centuries. The artists Levine examined span the 1800s to the 2000s, including D.H. Lawrence, John Ruskin, Elizabeth Barrett Browning, Charlotte Brontë, Bertolt Brecht, Constantin Brâncuși, Richard Serra, and Andreas Gursky.

Levine's third monograph, Forms: Whole, Rhythm, Hierarchy, Network (2015), argued that aesthetic patterns (which Levine calls "forms") are not just found in art, but may function as tools for control and analysis. According to Levine, a pattern like a hierarchy works the same way in a poem as it does in a company, society, or government. For example, a hierarchy may rank the protagonist above the servants in a play, while the same pattern ranks a landlord above a tenant in a city. Levine argued that patterns force human beings to act in certain ways; for instance, the "rhythm" of a school bell tells people exactly when to move, and the "network" of the internet dictates who they can talk to. According to Levine, human beings may learn how to spot, use, and change the patterns that control their real lives and their politics by studying patterns in stories. Levine analyzed a variety of works to show how the same patterns exist in both famous art and real-world systems, including The Wire (television) and Bleak House by Charles Dickens, as well as things that are not traditionally art like theme parks and medieval convents. Forms was the focus of a forum in PMLA in 2017.

A methodological guide for scholars, students, and citizens, Levine's fourth monograph, The Activist Humanist: Form and Method in the Climate Crisis (2023), argued for pivoting humanities scholarship toward practical, large-scale activism that influences public, structural change. Building on the theory developed in Forms, Levine proposed applying formalist methods—i.e., the analysis of organizational patterns—to social and physical infrastructures to build systems necessary for collective survival and climate justice. Levine urged all academics to come together and use their influence to avert global catastrophe. At the end of the book, Levine included a practical workbook, titled "Three Weeks to Political Action," which provided a guide for starting structural change.

== Reception and critiques ==
Levine's work has been praised for originality, clarity, and connecting form, politics, and the climate. Recurring criticisms, however, include a lack of historical context, treating capitalism as "one of many" patterns rather than a dominant force, and an unclear roadmap for practical activism.

Professor Philip V. Allingham (Lakehead University) observed that Levine's Serious Pleasures of Suspense neglected material, historical, and production-context factors that shaped how Victorian readers actually experienced suspense and narrative doubt. According to Allingham, Levine largely ignored the role of Victorian publishers, serialization, paratextual elements like illustrations, intertextuality, and how these shaped reception.

In her review of Provoking Democracy: Why We Need the Arts, Susana Smith Bautista, Ph.D., argued that Levine's elevation of the avant-garde artist as a democratic hero who challenges the mainstream rather than integrating with it pedagogically validates the very snob stereotype of the artist that the book set out to refute. In Bautista's view, Levine also underplayed the role of institutions like museums and glossed over how markets and politics amplify certain forms of provocation.

=== Reception and critiques of Forms ===
Forms was reviewed in venues such as PMLA, the Los Angeles Review of Books, the London Review of Books, and The Times Literary Supplement.

Professor Carolyn Lesjak (Simon Fraser University) observed that Forms offers limited ways to make real changes within the existing system rather than challenging the system itself. Lesjak contended that by treating all organizational patterns as equal, Levine ignores the underlying influences of global capitalism and the climate crisis. According to Lesjak, Levine's focus on small-scale collisions between forms makes it look like people have more freedom than they actually do. Lesjak argued that Levine chooses piecemeal "fixes" over a deeper analysis of how power and economic exploitation function.

Professor Tom Eyers (Duquesne University) argued that by refusing to say one form is more powerful than another, Levine's theory in Forms loses its teeth. He suggested that her definition of "form" is so broad that she never explained exactly how a book may change the real world. For Eyers, Levine provided more of a fancy description of how things overlap than a political critique.

David Alworth, Ph.D., noted that Forms lacks deep, worked-out examples and concrete guidance. He also argued that it risks presentism by treating ancient and modern forms as easily interchangeable.

Asking the rhetorical question, "Is this what critics do?", Professor Sheila Liming (Champlain College) questioned whether Levine's core activity of mapping and describing how forms collide qualifies as literary criticism. She suggested that the method might be too self-reflexive and descriptive to drive deep interpretation.

=== Reception and critiques of The Activist Humanist ===
The Activist Humanist was excerpted and critiqued in The Chronicle of Higher Education.

Professor Anne Pasek (Trent University) argued that The Activist Humanist does not provide an adequate step-by-step guide or quality-control standards for analyzing social structures, suggesting that without clear rules for what makes a "strong" or "weak" interpretation, Levine's approach works better as an inspiring idea than as a practical, teachable system.

Levine has explicitly mentioned that her method receives very little uptake from her peers in literary studies, identifying a "breezy cynicism" as a social norm among students and colleagues who discredit her engagement in active, collective struggle by labeling it as naïve, attention-seeking, and shrill. (Note: "I want to start from a different point and ... that for me always means both aesthetic and non-aesthetic forms [and] which forms most readily afford collective action ... This is a method point which I often try out on people and get very little uptake." -Levine) (Note: "I also think that, and I see this around me at Cornell among my students and my colleagues, kind of breezy cynicism is the social norm. And it's easy to discredit the few people who do engage in struggle as naive, attention-seeking or shrill, which only makes it harder for people who could be recruited to collective action to give up before. It makes it easier for them to give up before they've even begun." -Levine) She has acknowledged that some humanities scholars believe her "practical humanism" may overlook the supposed true value of the humanities, potentially turning them into a watered-down social science. (Note: "The other [major critique] is that I'm selling out the humanities because I'm turning towards these kind of instrumental plans and programs, like getting involved in action instead of sticking with the particular value of the aesthetic, which is open ended. By closing down that open endedness, I'm kind of saying, 'let's move over to the social sciences and away from the humanities.'" -Levine)

==== Dialogue with Sarah Cole on Activism ====
In a 2024 discussion hosted by the Columbia Climate School, Levine and Professor Sarah Cole, Dean of the School of the Arts and Parr Professor of English and Comparative Literature at Columbia University, discussed the integration of political action into humanist work. Cole argued for a distinction between academic instruction and political organizing:

I do think that we have a responsibility to offer our students, including undergraduates, a training in climate and society/culture, that moves well beyond (but can and should include) climate science ... Universities have often taken a role in advancing causes such as social and racial justice, and the climate crisis is certainly one of these ... But these can be distinguished from activism."

— Sarah Cole

Levine responded by advocating for a shift from academic awareness toward direct engagement:

Some argue that ... we should just read literature and look at art. But I think that studying art and literature has always had a political impulse behind it. A lot of people have argued that [the humanities] raises our consciousness ... [b]ut that doesn't give us tools for taking action, so I argue against that position. Most people now know that glaciers are melting, for example, but they don't know how to stop that process. It's time to move beyond raising awareness: we need to figure out what effective actions ordinary people can take. And my research makes it clear that small-scale individual actions ... aren't making enough of a difference. We need organized collective action to reduce the world's dependence on fossil fuels.

— Caroline Levine

== Awards and accolades ==
- 2004 Perkins Prize for Best Book in Narrative Studies from the Narrative Society
- 2015 James Russell Lowell Prize from the MLA
- 2016 Dorothy Lee Award for Outstanding Scholarship in the Ecology of Culture, Media Ecology Association

Levine was a 1992 Senior Prize recipient at Princeton, winning the Moses Taylor Pyne Honor Prize, awarded annually to that member of the senior class who has most clearly manifested scholarship, strength of character, and effective leadership.

Flavorwire named Forms as one of the 10 Must-Read Academic Books for 2015.

Levine was elected to the American Philosophical Society in 2026.

== Bibliography ==
Books

- The Serious Pleasures of Suspense: Victorian Realism and Narrative Doubt. Charlottesville and London: University of Virginia Press, 2003.
- Provoking Democracy: Why We Need the Arts. Oxford: Blackwell, 2007. "Manifestos" series. (Note: Polish translation: Od prowokacji do demokracji. Czyli o tym, dlaczego potrzebna nam sztuka. Warsaw: Musa, 2013.)
- Forms: Whole, Rhythm, Hierarchy, Network. Princeton: Princeton University Press, 2015. (Note: Turkish translation: Biçimler: Bütün, Ritim, Hiyerarşi, Ağ. Istanbul: Koç Üniversitesi Yayınları, 2017.; Korean translation: 『형식들: 전체, 리듬, 위계, 네트워크』. Paju Book City: 아카넷, 2021.)
- The Activist Humanist: Form and Method in the Climate Crisis. Princeton: Princeton University Press, 2023.

Anthologies

- Norton Anthology of World Literature. New York: W.W. Norton & Co., 2024. (Note: Levine is one of a team of co-editors. She is responsible for the nineteenth-century material.)

Edited Books

- From Author to Text: Re-reading George Eliot's Romola. Aldershot: Ashgate Press, 1998. (Note: A collection of essays co-edited with Professor Mark W. Turner (King's College London). Levine also contributed the essay, "The Prophetic Fallacy: Realism, Foreshadowing and Narrative Knowledge in Romola.")
- Narrative Middles: Navigating the Nineteenth-Century British Novel. Columbus: Ohio State University Press, 2011. (Note: Co-edited with Professor Mario Ortiz-Robles (University of Wisconsin-Madison).)
- Dr. Jekyll and Mr Hyde by Robert Louis Stevenson. New York: W.W. Norton & Co., 2021. (Note: New edition commissioned for the Norton Library series. This series provides a gateway for readers encountering classics for the first time. The editions use endnotes instead of footnotes so the pages remain clean and easy to read, and they include an introduction providing necessary historical and literary context. These editions are typically priced lower to make them accessible for students and general readers.)

Edited Special Issues of Journals

- "Gender, Genre and George Eliot," Women's Writing 3:2. 1996. (Note: Special issue co-edited with Mark W. Turner, with co-authored introduction: 95–96)
- "Reading for Pleasure: The Gender of Popular Genres," The Journal of Popular Culture 35:1. 2001. (Note: Special issue of The Journal of Popular Culture co-edited with Mark W. Turner, with co-authored introduction: 1–4)
- "What Counts as World Literature?", MLQ 74:2 (June), with co-authored introduction. 2013. (Note: Special issue, co-edited with Professor B. Venkat Mani (University of Wisconsin-Madison))
- "Television for Victorianists," special issue of Romanticism and Victorianism on the Net 63 (April), with introduction. 2013.

== See also ==
- Birmingham school
- Literary criticism
- Victorian literature
