= Ravon =

Ravon or RAVON may refer to:

- RAVON, German robot
- Ravon, Uzbekistan
- Ravon, an automotive marque used by UzAuto Motors
- Romanticism and Victorianism on the Net (RaVoN), an online journal
