= Collapsable Hole =

Avant-garde performance space in New York City

- The Hole
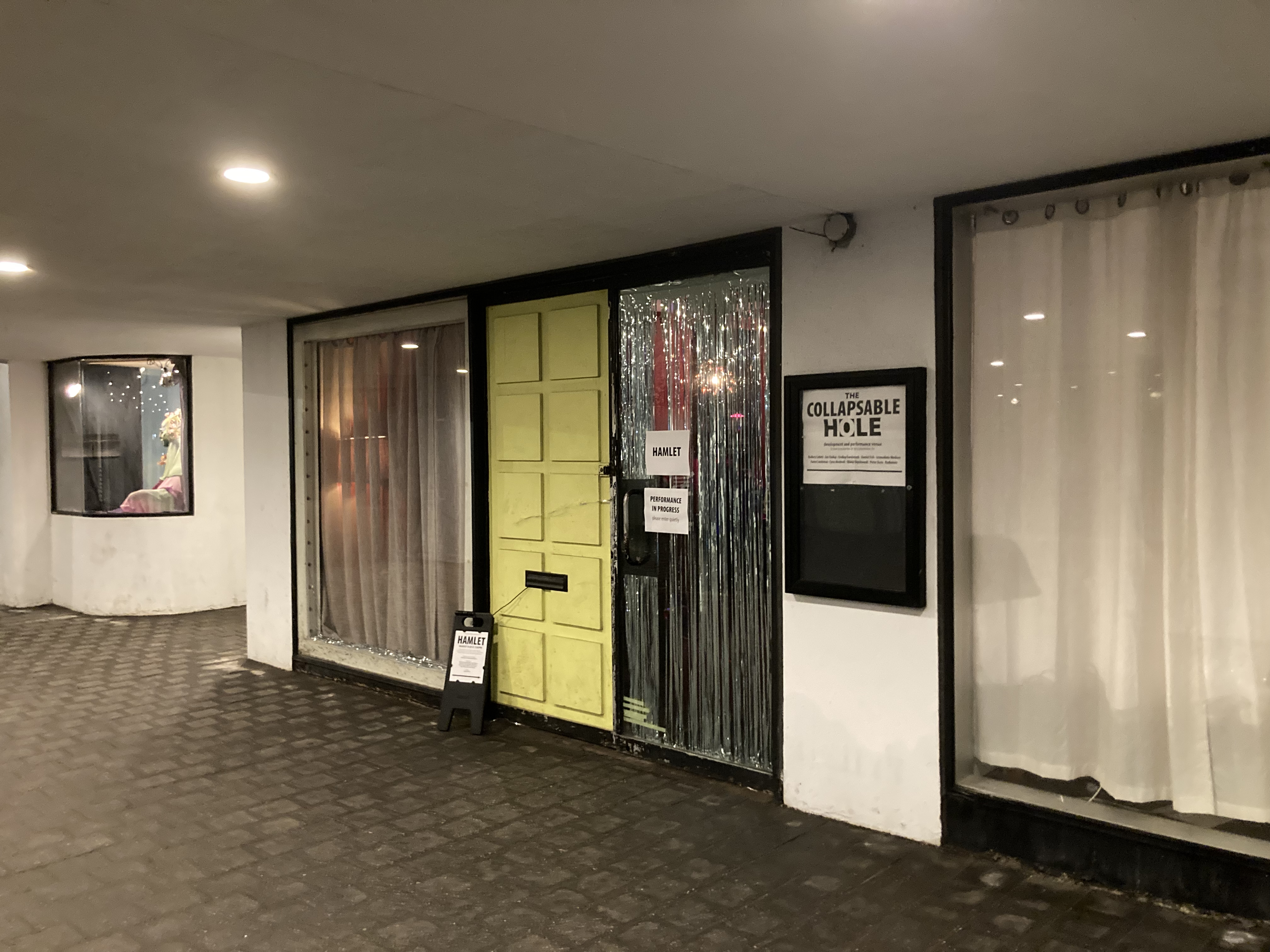
- Collapsable Hole at Westbeth, 2024
- Interactive map of Collapsable Hole
- Location: 155 Bank Street; Manhattan, New York City
- Coordinates: 40°44′11″N 74°00′33″W

Website
- thehole.site

The Collapsable Hole is a artist-run performance space in New York City.

Co-founded in 2000 by the performance companies Radiohole and The Collapsable Giraffe, The Hole was originally located at 146 Metropolitan Avenue in Willamsburg, Brooklyn. Described in The New York Times as "a spare industrial box except for all the techie gadgetry" it helped establish the area as "a full-fledged theater district. Call it Off Off Off Broadway", alongside The Charlie Pineapple Theater, The Brick, Galapagos Art Space, the Streb Laboratory for Action Mechanics (SLAM), Monkey Town, and Supreme Trading.

The Metropolitan Avenue location opened on December 1, 2000 and existed until its final Memorial Service on September 14, 2013. It was later resurrected at 155 Bank Street in the West Village, Manhattan at Westbeth, where it continues to serve as a forum for avant performance.

== Partners / Affiliated Artists ==
As of 2026, partners in The Hole are Mallory Catlett / Restless NYC, Collapsible Giraffe / Jim Findlay, Immediate Medium, Cyrus Moshrefi, Object Collection, and Radiohole. Affiliated artists are Daniel Fish, Aaron Landsman, Findlay//Sandsmark, and Okwui Okpokwasili & Peter Born.

== Other Associated Artists ==
The Hole has see presentations of work by numerous artists and performance companies, including:

- Anna Kohler
- Banana Bag & Bodice
- Ben Neill
- Big Dance Theater
- Bob McGrath
- Cynthia Hopkins
- Elevator Repair Service
- Joe Silovsky
- Mikel Rouse
- NTUSA
- Sibyl Kempson
- Young Jean Lee

== Recognition ==
- Obie Grant, 2003
