= Brujas =

Brujas may refer to:

- Brujas F.C., association football team
- Brujas (TV series), television series
- Brujas (film), a 1996 Spanish drama film
- Brujas (play), a 1988 Spanish play
- Brujas, Panama, city in Panama
- Bruja (novel), horror novel
- Brujas (album), a 2013 album by Mala Rodriguez
- Brujas (skate crew), Bronx-based skateboarding collective
- Brujería, the Spanish word for "witchcraft"
- Brujas (moth), a synonym for the moth genus Hemeroblemma
- Spanish name of the Belgian town of Bruges
