= Janice Perry =

- Education: Drew University, Goddard College
- Known for: Performance art
- Movement: Feminist art

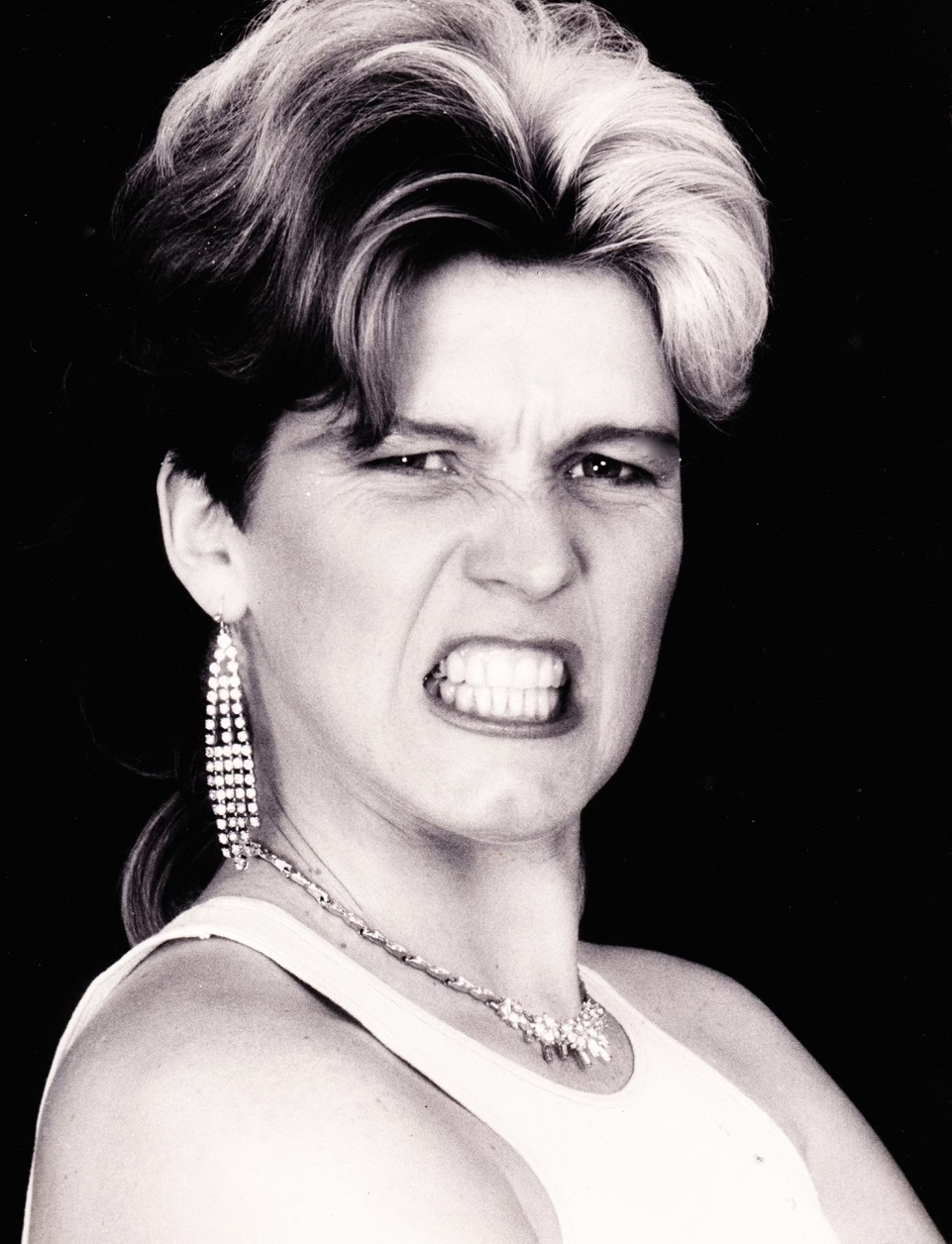
Janice Gal Perry

Janice Perry (also known as GAL) is an American performance artist. Described as "a cross between Doris Day and a high-velocity rifle", her interdisciplinary work has been presented on stage, published, screened at film festivals, adapted for radio and television (NPR, PBS, BBC), and exhibited at academic and cultural institutions in the United States and Europe. Perry began international touring in 1981.

She has received multiple fellowships for live performance, visual art, and teaching from the Fulbright Commission/US Department of State, the National Endowment for the Arts, the Vermont Arts Council, the Vermont Community Foundation, and other organizations. Her performance/installation, Being Derrida, was a semi-finalist in the Smithsonian Institution's National Portrait Gallery Outwin Boochever Portrait Competition.

Perry taught performance studies as a Fulbright professor in American studies at Goethe University Frankfurt, and the University of Würzburg from 2001 to 2005; and at the University of Vermont in the Departments of English, Theatre, Art, and Leadership and Developmental Sciences in association with the UVM Gender Studies program from 2006 to 2017.

Throughout her career, Perry has led and partnered on international collaborations in multi-media, site responsive, video and live art performance, and more traditional stage work with groups of students, and emerging and established artists in the US, Europe, South Korea, and South Africa, researching performativity in intersectional identity, theoretical, social, and scientific concepts.
