= Radiohole =

Theater artist collective

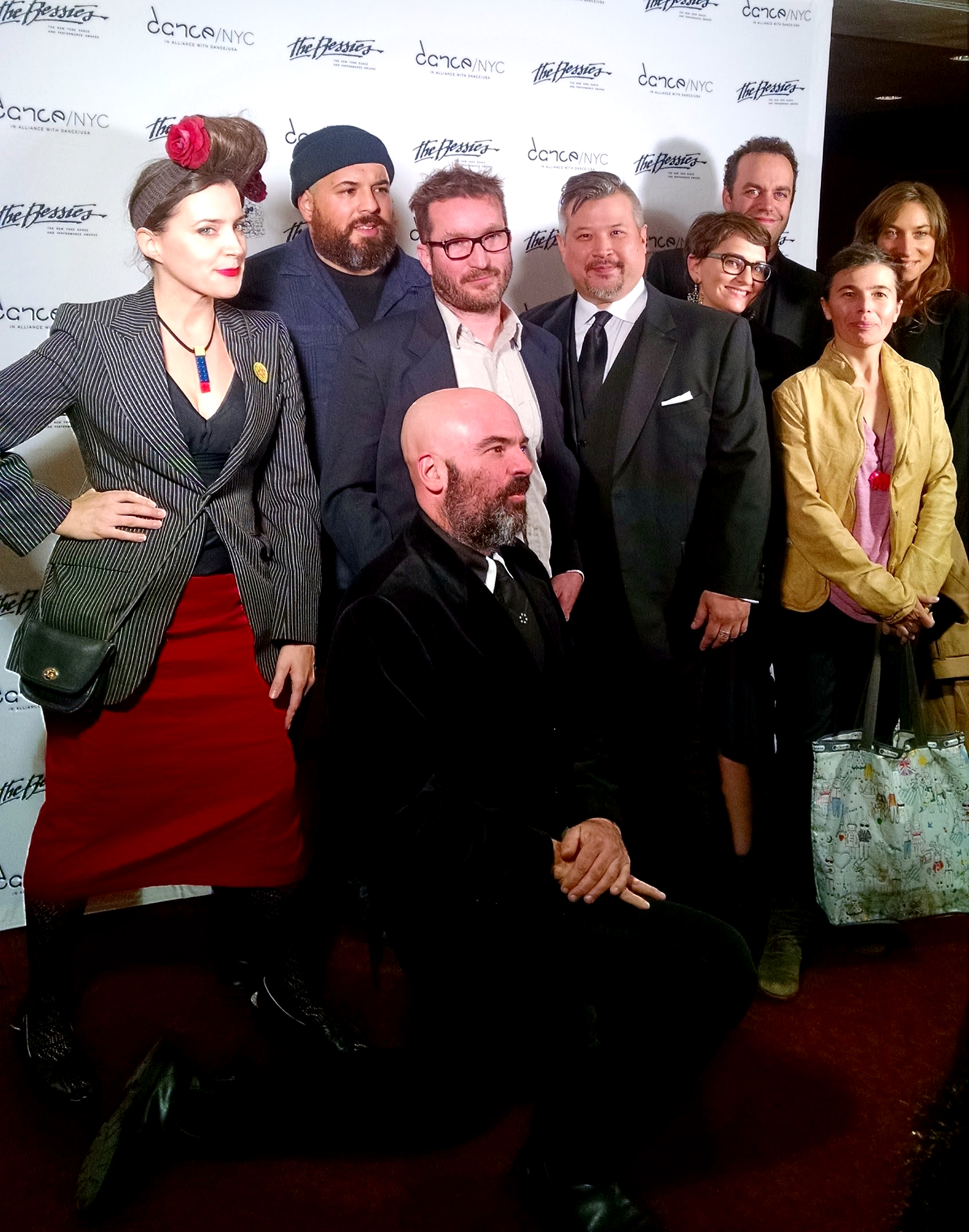
- Maggie Hoffman, Ilan Bachrach, Eric Dyer, Scott Halvorsen Gillette, Jon Okabayashi, Erin Douglass, Andreea Mincic, and Amanda Bender at The Bessie Awards
- Formation: 1998
- Type: Theatre group
- Location: New York City, New York, United States
- Website: radiohole.com

Radiohole is a collective of artists that have created devised performance works since 1998. Radiohole was founded by Erin Douglass, Eric Dyer, Scott Halvorsen Gillette, and Maggie Hoffman, and has been described by The Drama Review as “the quintessential American performance group".

In 2000, Radiohole and The Collapsable Giraffe founded the Obie Award-winning space The Collapsable Hole in Williamsburg, Brooklyn. The artist-run venue has since relocated to Westbeth in NYC's West Village.

As of 2026, Radiohole has created 17 original full-length shows and numerous short pieces. Venues at which Radiohole has premiered / performed work include: The Kitchen, PS122, The Performing Garage, La Mama, and Walker Art Center.

In addition to their own work, they have collaborated with other artists - for Tarzana, they commissioned initial text from writer Jason Grote - and have provided a forum for other artists to present work, such as 2023's EXPOSURE show, which included performances by Paris Alexander, Julia Mounsey, Alex Tatarsky, and Peter Mills Weiss, among others.

They have also provided internships for other artists - Young Jean Lee credits Radiohole with providing an opportunity for her to learn how to direct: "Through NTUSA, I met a company called Radiohole... I interned with them for two years, going to every single rehearsal, every single performance, and that’s how I learned how to direct."

== Works ==
Original works by Radiohole:

- Bender (1998)
- A History of Heen (1999)
- Rodan (1999)
- Bend Your Mind Off (2000)
- NONE OF IT (2002)
- WURST (2002)
- RADIOHOLE IS STILL MY NAME (2004)
- FLUKE (2006)
- ANGER/NATION (2007)
- WHATEVER, HEAVEN ALLOWS (2009)
- INFLATABLE FRANKENSTEIN (2013)
- MYTH OR METH (2014)
- TARZANA (2014)
- HOLLYWOOD DOLLS (HULL I HODET) (2016) - with the Norwegian Theatre Academy
- TV PARTY (2017)
- NOW SERVING (2019)
- HAPPY HOURS (2020)

== Production ==
Presented by Radiohole:

- ISOLATION: A group show of new work made during the pandemic - 2021
- EXPOSURE: A group show of performance works exploring the body - Prelude Festival, 2023
- FAUST - 2023 (by Eric Dyer)
- HAMLET - 2024 (by Christopher Rashee Stevenson)

== Recognition ==
- Spalding Gray Award, 2009
- A 2013 Wall Street Journal survey of 40 New York-based theater artists placed Radiohole third in a list of companies and venues they felt most deserved funding, after New Dramatists and The Chocolate Factory.
