= Racial Innocence =

2013 nonfiction book by Robin Bernstein

Racial Innocence: Performing American Childhood from Slavery to Civil Rights is a nonfiction book by Robin Bernstein. It was published in 2011 by NYU Press.

== Synopsis ==
During the mid-nineteenth century, American perspectives on childhood changed significantly. Childhood went from the Calvinist belief that a child was inherently flawed to a child is an innocent being. However, this change in view applied to white children and not other races. The author shows how now archived material evidence shaped American worldviews and racial divides.

== Accolades ==
According to the publisher, this book was awarded the following honors:

- 2013 Book Award Winner from the International Research Society in Children's Literature
- 2012 Outstanding Book Award Winner from the Association for Theatre in Higher Education
- 2012 Winner of the Lois P. Rudnick Book Prize presented by the New England American Studies Association
