= Jon McKenzie =

Performance theorist

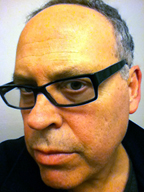
- Jon McKenzie
- Occupation: Professor of English
- Known for: Author, scholar, theorist, artist, and designer.

Jon McKenzie is a performance theorist, media maker, and transdisciplinary researcher and teacher at Cornell University. He is founder of the StudioLab pedagogy and former director of DesignLab at the University of Wisconsin-Madison. McKenzie's main interests are in new media, performance theory, and the role of art and technology in cultural research, contemporary processes of globalization, and emerging forms of social activism.

== Career ==
=== Degree ===
Throughout his career McKenzie has achieved the following degrees: BFA (with honours) at the University of Florida, Department of Fine Arts (1984); MA (with honours) at the University of Florida, Department of English (1987); and finally a PhD at the New York University, Tisch School of the Arts, Department of Performance Studies (1996). McKenzie has held a number of professional positions including; Writing Instructor, Department of English, University of Florida (1985–1987); Assistant Professor, Department of Multimedia, The University of the Arts (1999–2001); and Associate and Full Professor, Department of English, University of Wisconsin-Milwaukee (2006–2007); Full Professor, Department of English, University of Wisconsin-Madison; and Dean's Fellow for Media and Design and Visiting Professor of English at Cornell University.

== Influences ==
During his time as an undergraduate at the University of Florida McKenzie was heavily influenced by the work of Professor Gregory Ulmer and his theories of applied Grammatology. By taking film classes with Ulmer and fellow Professor Robert Ray, McKenzie began to explore art informed by theories of relativity and psychoanalysis. This led to an interest in the deconstructive and grammatological projects of Jacques Derrida. The first lesson that Ulmer taught McKenzie was that even the most critical of theories, such as Marx and Freud, came from creativity and invention. Therefore, for McKenzie theory became a form of applied conceptual art. The second lesson Ulmer taught McKenzie was to approach the classroom as a performance space, a site where materials (bodies, ideas, media) could be mixed together to create pedagogical events.

Another influence for McKenzie has been performance artist Laurie Anderson as he was fascinated by the complexity and simplicity of her work. He wrote his master's theses on Anderson's United States Parts: I-IV where he explored Anderson's multimedia performance art using Derrida's notion of grammatological, generalised writing, while also trying to explore the relation of experimental performance and the highly normative theory of performativity articulated by Lyotard. In his essay ‘Laurie Anderson for Dummies’ McKenzie analyses Anderson's performance stories from the Never Bible and her CD ROM, ‘Puppet Motel’; and how they are related to his interest in performative pedagogies.

The years at Florida shaped McKenzie's approach to theory and life and Ulmer's teaching left a big thumbprint on his mind. ‘The experimental approach to theory is constant, the emphasis on generalised writing, multimedia, mixing them up. Anagrammatology’.

== McKenzie's concepts and views on performance theory ==
Jon McKenzie has various views on performance theory. He refers to performance as having multiple definitions: performance as spectacle, performance as a machine's effectiveness, and a government representative's performance during speeches. All these concepts are becoming ‘entwined’ (McKenzie, 2003; 118) due to the different paradigms involved around the phenomena in defining what is performance. McKenzie describes the whole world as becoming a ‘test site,’ (McKenzie, 2003; 120) in which everything is being tested as a performance. McKenzie believes that the world is entering ‘an age of global performance.' He believes that performance has become globalized and that everything can be perceived as a performance. In the article, 'Democracy’s Performance,' he notes that ‘performance practices have gone digital... merging art, activism and technology to create electronic civil disobedience’ (McKenzie, 2003; 117). According to McKenzie, performance studies is constantly ‘contesting’ (McKenzie, 2003; 117) and expanding its own concepts through ‘experimental’ (McKenzie, 2003; 117) ways of teaching and research. McKenzie considers the definition of performance in light of globalization to be ‘too American’ (McKenzie, 2006; 7) because it is problematically seen as universal, where, in actuality, each piece of performance is contextually unique.

Another of McKenzie's theories, influenced by the work of Judith Butler, Jean-François Lyotard and Herbert Marcuse, is that performance has formed a ‘performance stratum’ (McKenzie, 2003;117). This stratum involves the intersection of power and knowledge; although he admits that it has not ‘fully installed itself’ (McKenzie, 2001; 6); he has come to this conclusion by extending Michel Foucault's theories of discipline, in which he believes there needs to be a term to explain the different degrees of performance; cultural, organizational, and technological, although this term is only new due to the emergence of the globalization of performance; which is rapidly increasing. Referencing Friedrich Nietzsche, he also suggests that Gay Science might help us to develop a methodology that can be practiced within performance by interweaving paradigms and researching different types performance. In the article ‘Democracy’s Performance’ he suggests that global performance contains complex forces and affects; the effects being a system of barometers including the Eurobarometer, which are a group of demographic constituencies which take public surveys based on the performance of democracy in countries and regions across the world. The thoughts expressed in the article by McKenzie are extended thoughts based on research for his book Perform or Else.

McKenzie notes in ‘Performance and Global Transference’ that cultural performances contribute to the contemporary process of globalization. Although he generally sees the globalization of performance as having a negative impact, he does see some positive aspects, such as: the emergence of universal human rights, establishment of the world court (international court of justice), annual conferences on global warming and the AIDS crisis, and the formation of Performance Studies International, co-founded by noted American feminist scholar Peggy Phelan.

A unifying theme throughout all of McKenzie's work is researching what performance might mean in an attempt to build a clear and unique single definition that sums up various paradigms in performance studies globally. It is understood that his goal by publishing materials is to create an understanding of different theorists and researchers around the world and their different understanding of terms and approach to cultural performance and help solve problematic queries regarding to the definition of performance which is increasingly difficult as the further you research the more contradicting performance becomes to its previous definitions. This is established as his mission statement within ‘Is Performance Studies Imperialist?’(McKenzie, 2006).

== StudioLab ==
In 1996 McKenzie decided to tackle the question: ‘How does an artist perform technologically?’ With this performance in mind he taught ‘Electronic Performance’ as a graduate course in the summer of 1996 and then in an undergraduate workshop in the autumn. McKenzie explains that ‘the focus of both workshops was to explore electronic performance as the cross of cultural performance (such as theatre, ritual and performance art) and technological performance (ranging from clocks and answering machines to computers and the internet). McKenzie explains that both humans and technologies perform: ‘interfaces are thus always joint performances’. McKenzie believed that it was critically important for his drama students to experience and experiment with new media. Student participation is a high expectation in McKenzie's classes and he has created a framework that allows students to add their own work.

The StudioLab is designed to take place in studio and computer lab environments, allowing students to develop critico-creative projects and digital skills using models drawn from cultural performance: theatre, performance art, ritual and practices of everyday life. In the studio, the students work in ‘bands’ to collaboratively conceive and develop performative aspects of their projects. StudioLab bands contain specialised players; one student might focus on imagery, another on text and another on interactive elements. However, in the lab, the same students work in different groupings called ‘guilds’ to develop the electronic elements needed by the bands. Guilds are technically monochromatic, composed of specialised players such as Photoshoppers, Hypertextualists and Interactivists. Individual guild members then bring their skills back to their bands in the studio, integrating them into projects. Moving between studio and lab, band and guild, these projects unfold through the interlacing of bodies, ideas and media. McKenzie's role in this process is one of producer giving his students advice on how to mix their tracks. The interlacing of the bands and guilds was an important discovery for McKenzie, for it took the collaboration to a higher level.

One project McKenzie used was ‘Interface in Everyday Life’ combining performance art and Donald Norman’s work on interface design. Students were given the opportunity to pick a common interface, explore the activities the design brings forth, and create a live performance from this exploration. They then tried to translate the performance back into a Web interface. Another project is a transformation of Brenda Laurel’s Computers as Theatre, which developed a theory of human-computer interaction using Aristotle's Poetics. Students created actual and virtual events by substituting another performance form for Greek tragedy: Kabuki, solo performance, Dada, Sumo as well as the theatre of Brecht, Artuad, Schechner and LeCompte.

In this interview McKenzie was asked about his opinion about the validity of collaborative student Web projects. He explained that theatre has traditionally been a collaborative activity: ‘If dramatic writing has traditionally been a solitary activity, producing theatre has always been collaborative: actors, costume and set designers, technical crews, etc. It's this collaborative dimension that makes theatre so applicable to creating new media, which requires integrating so many different skills and media. McKenzie believes that the model of individual genius that has dominated modern aesthetics is giving way to collaborative modes of creativity. For him, all creativity is social and recombinant’. McKenzie goes on to talk about the process of updating and maintaining a large website like StudioLab. He joked that ‘Maintaining a Website was artificial life!’ He explains that the joke makes sense on two levels: First, anyone who builds and maintains a site knows that it takes some effort and if you want it to be really interesting, it takes a lot of effort so much that it can take over your life for a while. Second, the joke suggests Manuel De Landa's notion of inorganic life, which teaches us something important about human-computer interfaces, namely, that there are feedback loops and machinic processes everywhere, operating in all mediums—organic and inorganic—and doing so at very different scales and temporalities. Machinic processes are more than tools, more than mediums even: at a general level, they make up everything.

In sum: StudioLab is characterised by the circulation between studio and lab environments, by collaborative learning in different sociotechnical groupings and by the mixing and fine-tuning of physical, conceptual and multimedia elements.

Jon McKenzie's second book published in 2019 Transmedia Knowledge for Liberal Arts and Community Engagement: A StudioLab Manifesto provides an overview of his StudioLab pedagogy.

== McKenzie Stojnić ==
In 2017, McKenzie co-founded the media performance group McKenzie Stojnić together with his spouse, performance theorist and artist Aneta Stojnić. Their first performance, "Thought Action Figures EPISODE 7: THE THINKERS," premiered on 23 May 2018 at Spring Festival in Utrecht. McKenzie Stojnić operated at the intersections of art & life, theory & practice, playing & reality and episteme & doxa and performed across a variety of media. The main focus and means of their collaborative work was Thought Action Figures a.k.a. TAF. TAF is an original concept conceived by Jon McKenzie and developed by McKenzie and Stojnić in a series of lecture-performances, comics, videos, talks, publications, workshops etc. They proposed TAFs as a new mode of thinking and performing in digital age. TAFs overcome the limitations of ideation and literacy for the benefits of figuration, digitally and transmedia knowledge. McKenzie explains: "With transmedia knowledge, a new image of thought emerges: Thought-Action Figures, which are to digitality what ideas are to literacy, basic forms of thought and existence (recall that Plato interpreted Being as eidos). Thought-Action Figures are not limited to human figures: animals, plants, machines, systems, processes, materialities, symbols and other abstract entities—all become thought-action figures via transmediation, movement through mediums deemed material, spiritual, cultural, etc. within different ontologies.". Aneta Stojnić elaborates: "TAFs are figures of thought as well as concrete objects that allow us to transform and perform ideas, concepts, and knowledge across different media and in variety of forms. TAFs are always created in relation, and they always produce meaning: that is what distinguishes them from simple objects. These relations are multiple, fluid, networked, transversal, and always in motion."

== Published literature ==
=== Definition ===
McKenzie's most heavily cited work is the 2001 book Perform or Else: From Discipline to Performance. In his book ‘Perform or Else,' McKenzie questions whether there is a single and conclusive definition capturing all types of performance. In the first part McKenzie reviews the research area Performance Studies. Including how theatre transcended into performance as well as industries and corporations emergence into performance. Due to its complexity, there is no fixed definition of performance despite its vast field of research. McKenzie attempts to find a universal and coherent definition of performance and questions whether it is feasible to do so. He then explores why and how performance has emerged as a theoretical paradigm within the past century. He proves why there is a need for a single coherent definition of performance and shows how it goes beyond a concept of theory for theatre. McKenzie's research uses the 1986 NASA Challenger Space Shuttle shuttle flight as a case study linking his theory to that of Marcuse, Lyotard and Butler, and assesses its performative qualities. He challenges himself to create a meta-performance theory called ‘perfumance’ (McKenzie, 2001: 232). Perfumance is a neologism from McKenzie's research into finding a global definition for performance. A perfumance incorporates the sense of smell into performance, as performance as a manifesto with an alluring smell to it, that everyone is drawn to and pulled in and trapped, due to its complex meaning. McKenzie notes that ‘perfumance emits emissions of the future’ (McKenzie, 2001: 232). Meaning that it can finally end the ongoing discussion battle of performance; solving the problems of global communications.

=== Politics ===
In a platform about performance studies Jon McKenzie gives a speech titled ‘Democratizing Torture: Three Scenarios’ McKenzie addresses to the participants that society is ‘dictated’ (McKenzie, 2005:1) by performance and that people are ‘judged’ (McKenzie, 2005:1) on whether their actions can be tested as performance according to the State of the art. Performance he continues has become to find an ‘emergence of freedom’ (McKenzie, 2005:1) due to the large ‘undetermined’ (McKenzie, 2005:1) field which overlaps other fields such as institutions and processes. He continues by saying that ‘everything and everybody’ (McKenzie, 2005:1) is being judged by its potential in performance and theorists are now beginning to predict the new performance hierarchies. He then begins to discuss three scenarios based on this new immergence of performance and democracy and what he predicts by using these three scenarios what the future entails because of this performance. The first being an extension of today's society he calls this ‘clean torture’ (McKenzie, 2005:2) which entails; stun guns, stress position and highly public human rights initiatives. He calls this ‘torture as usual’ (McKenzie, 2005:2). He addresses the second scenario as ‘society of the spectacle of the Scaffold’ (McKenzie, 2005:2) of which entails politicians becoming ‘security obsessed’ (McKenzie, 2005:2) because of the increasing danger of terrorism. This meaning the theatre of torture goes public as civilians begin to support ‘enhanced interrogation techniques’ (McKenzie, 2005:2). The final scenario McKenzie discusses is ‘A world without torture’ (McKenzie, 2005:2). He explores the avenues we need to explore to abolish torture on a global mass. He argues that international human rights have helped develop clean torture techniques rather than the brutal torture techniques developed in earlier decades.

=== Society ===
In 2005 McKenzie wrote another article titled ‘Hacktivism and Machinic Performance’ in which he attempted to define both terms in context to the social climate of today. He referred to his book ‘Perform or Else’ when he defines Hacktivism: ‘the emergence of political activism within digital environments, primarily but not exclusively, the Internet’. McKenzie's goal has been to theorise the performance of hacktivism in hope of connecting his research on electronic civil disobedience to his ongoing performance research. Whilst being interested in cultural performances such as performance art and political theatre, McKenzie has focused on the relationships between cultural performance and ‘high performance’ technologies and ‘peak performance’ organisations. As well as being interested in these three performances (cultural, organisations and technological) McKenzie is most interested in performance as the defining modality of power in contemporary society. He goes on to define machinic performances as ‘arising when different processes ‘recur’ or communicate across diverse systems, thereby creating performances that escape subjective control and even objective analysis...They happen at multiple sites through multiple agents, both human and technological. Machinic performances pose a real challenge to study, as to research a machinic performance is perhaps to become part of it’. McKenzie suggests that two areas where machinic performance was most visible are interface design and socio-technical systems. In new media interface design is primarily in discrete human-computer interactions, such as an exchange in front of an automated teller machine (ATM) or on a web page. The machinic performance is precisely the interaction between an individual and a PC or other device, each providing the other with information. From another perspective, however, McKenzie states that all human-computer interactions are actually close-ups of larger socio-technological systems. It is not simply one person standing at an ATM: it is a customer base interacting with a financial institution or even a whole client sector interacting with a multinational banking industry. McKenzie believes that socio-technical systems perform machinically: they entail communication across diverse structures and processes, and their ‘events’ are not confined to discrete times and places, but are instead distributed across many performance sites.

=== Speech ===
In the article ‘Democracy’s Performance’ (McKenzie, 2003), McKenzie extends his discussion and research on performance he produced in ‘Perform or Else’ (McKenzie, 2001) by discussing the definition of performance further. He begins this by using George W. Bush’s speech; his announcement of war on terrorism as a performance, he tests his speech to see, according to the term performance, whether it is indeed a performance as such. McKenzie goes on to discuss how performance has become involved in a power matrix and the ‘will to power’ (McKenzie, 2003: 119) performance stratum. Through discussing this he gives his theory structure by using evidence linking the idea ‘the will to become in power’ (McKenzie, 2003: 119) to performance through George Bush. He does this by showing how Bush's will makes his speech become a performance as he emphasizes his democratic views in order to gain the public's faith. McKenzie argues that Bush used a weak point in America by tackling the 9/11 attacks by blaming those responsible in a historical and philosophical perspective by linking the attacks of Al Qaeda and comparing these attacks to those of Pearl Harbor.

=== Culture ===
In the article ‘Performance and Global Transference’ (McKenzie, 2001) McKenzie analyses the impact of globalization on cultural performances. Commenting on previous research from the article ‘Democracy’s Performance’ (McKenzie, 2003) he continues his theory by saying that the stratum he has developed to make a clearer term for performance has not been ‘fully installed’ (McKenzie, 2003:6) this being due to the emergence of globalization and the era we are heading into of global performance.

His research in performance theory has inspired performance arts groups, such as Doorika, mentioned in the feminist theory journal Women & Performance.
