= Robin Bernstein (historian) =

American academic (born 1969)

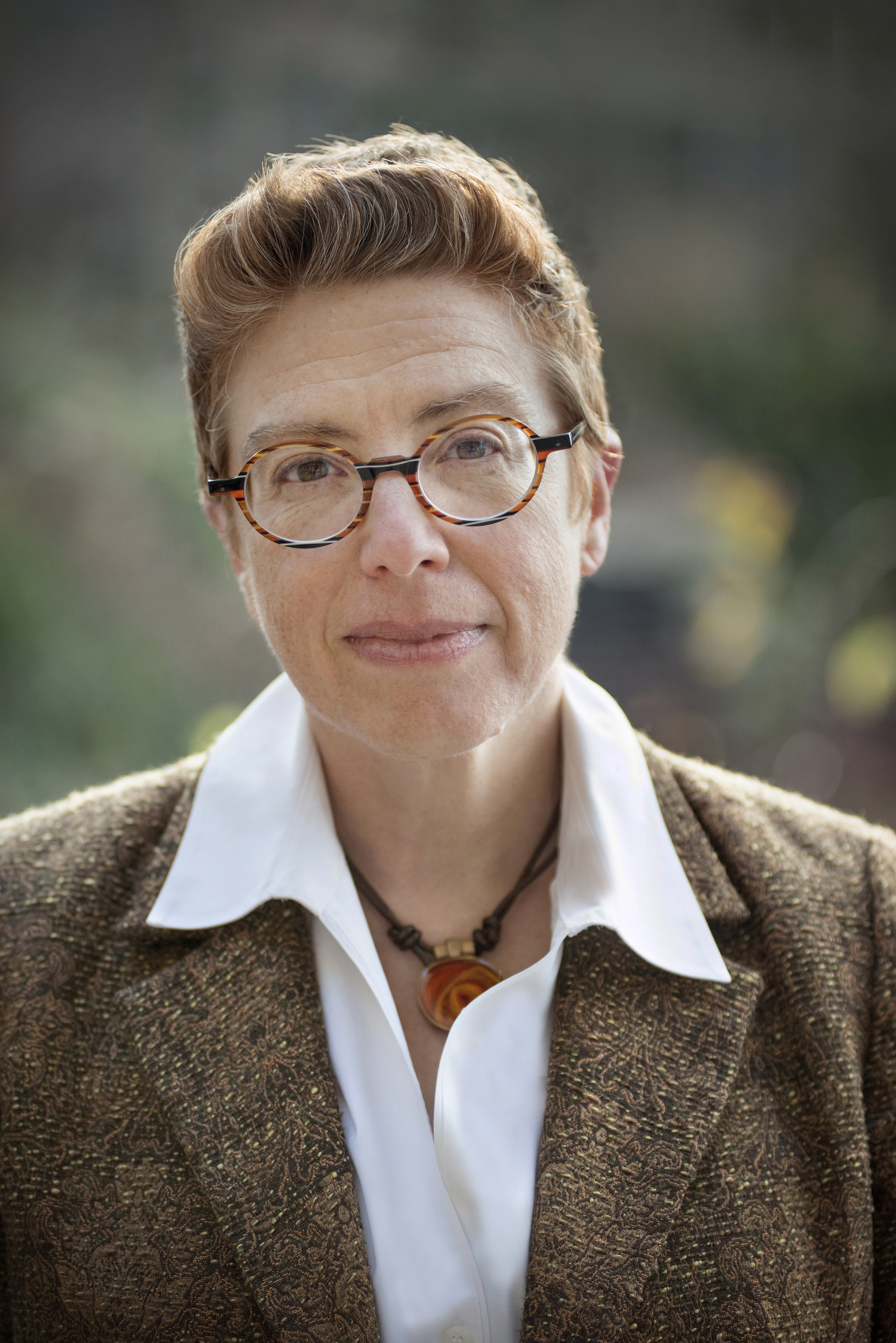
- Bernstein in 2024
- Born: 1969 (age 56–57)

Academic background
- Education: Bryn Mawr College (BA); University of Maryland, College Park (MA); George Washington University (MA); Yale University (PhD)

Academic work
- Discipline: American studies
- Sub-discipline: African-American history, Performance studies
- Institutions: Harvard University
- Website: Official website

Robin Bernstein is a cultural historian who specializes in race and racism from the nineteenth century to the present. A graduate of Yale’s doctoral program in American Studies, she teaches at Harvard University, where she is the Dillon Professor of American History and Professor of African and African American Studies and of Studies of Women, Gender, and Sexuality. She also chairs Harvard’s doctoral program in American Studies. Bernstein wrote her book Freeman’s Challenge: The Murder that Shook America’s Original Prison for Profit (University of Chicago Press 2024) with fellowships from the National Endowment for the Humanities and the Radcliffe Institute for Advanced Study. Freeman's Challenge won the 2026 Herbert H. Lehman Prize for Distinguished Scholarship, 2025 PROSE Award for North American/U.S. History, the 2025 Montaigne Medal, and the 2025 Nonfiction Honor from the Massachusetts Book Award. Freeman's Challenge also received Honorable Mention for the 2025 Merle Curti Award for Social History from the Organization of American Historians. Her previous book, Racial Innocence: Performing American Childhood from Slavery to Civil Rights (NYU Press 2011), won five awards. Other publications include a Jewish feminist children’s book, many prize-winning articles, and op-eds and essays in The New York Times, The Chronicle of Higher Education, and other venues.

== Career ==
=== Research and writing ===
Bernstein researches race through several thematic lenses, including childhood, theatre, and performance studies.

Her book Freeman’s Challenge: The Murder that Shook America’s Original Prison for Profit was published by the University of Chicago Press in May 2024. This book exposes the true origins of profit-driven incarceration—not in the South after the Civil War, as many assume, but instead in the North half a century earlier. She tells this story through the life of one young Afro-Native man named William Freeman. When he was fifteen years old, Freeman was incarcerated in the Auburn State Prison, the first for-profit prison in the United States. Forced to work for no pay in prison factories, Freeman rebelled, with effects that reverberate into the present day. Bernstein wrote Freeman’s Challenge with support from the National Endowment for the Humanities and the Radcliffe Institute for Advanced Study. The book was praised by academics including Angela Y. Davis, Tiya Miles, Ibram X. Kendi, Heather Ann Thompson, Elizabeth Hinton, and Caleb Smith. It has won the Herbert H. Lehman Prize for Distinguished Scholarship, the PROSE Book Award, the Montaigne Medal, the Massachusetts Book Award Nonfiction Honor, and was an honorable mention for the Merle Curti Social History Award.

Racial Innocence: Performing American Childhood from Slavery to Civil Rights won the Outstanding Book Award from the Association for Theatre in Higher Education (co-winner), the Grace Abbott Best Book Award from the Society for the History of Children and Youth, the Book Award from the Children's Literature Association, the Lois P. Rudnick Book Prize from the New England American Studies Association, and the IRSCL Award from the International Research Society for Children's Literature. Racial Innocence was also a runner-up for the American Studies Association's John Hope Franklin Publication Prize and received an Honorable Mention for the Book Award from the Society for the Study of American Women Writers. Bernstein's other books include the anthology Cast Out: Queer Lives in Theater (University of Michigan Press 2006) and a Jewish feminist children's book titled Terrible, Terrible! (Kar-Ben Publishing 1998).

In 2018, Bernstein published the forgotten 1897 slave narrative of Jane Clark, who liberated herself from slavery in Maryland by undergoing an arduous three-year journey that ended in Auburn, New York in 1859. The full text of the narrative (which was penned by a white amanuensis), along with her annotations and an introduction that verifies and contextualizes Jane Clark's story, was published in Common-place, an online journal of accessible history for lay readers.

She also writes opinion pieces, including op-eds and academic advice. The New York Times published her op-ed "Let Black Kids Just Be Kids," and Harvard Magazine published "Being Alive Together: Stephen Sondheim, Omicron, and the Power of Theater." She publishes academic advice columns in The Chronicle of Higher Education, including "The Art of ‘No,’" "Can You Reverse a Defeatist Habit that Sabotages Your Writing?" "You are Not a Public Utility," "How to Talk to Famous Professors," and "Banish the Smarm: Effective Networking is Sincere, Deep, and Generous." With Stephanie Batiste and Brian Herrera, she co-edits the NYU Press book series Performance and American Cultures.

Bernstein's article “‘You Do It!’: Going-to-Bed Books and the Scripts of Children’s Literature" co-won the MLA’s William Riley Parker Prize for the best article in PMLA.

=== Teaching ===
Bernstein teaches in the Department of African and African American Studies and the Program in Studies of Women, Gender, and Sexuality at Harvard. She also chairs Harvard’s doctoral program in American Studies. She has been honored to receive a Harvard College Professorship, which recognizes “particularly distinguished contributions to undergraduate teaching and to creating a positive influence in the culture of teaching in the Faculty of Arts and Sciences.” In 2021, she received the Everett Mendelsohn Excellence in Mentoring Award, an honor conferred by the Graduate Student Council at Harvard.
