= Fabian Muniesa =

Author and social scientist

- Born: 16 October 1972 (age 53); Madrid, Spain
- Citizenship: French, Spanish
- Occupation: Social scientist

Academic background
- Education: Universidad Complutense de Madrid

Academic work
- Discipline: Science and technology studies, Sociology
- Institutions: École des Mines de Paris
- Main interests: Cultural studies, Performativity, Actor-Network Theory

Fabian Muniesa (alternative spelling: Fabián Muniesa) is an author, social scientist, and poet of French and Spanish citizenship. He is a Professor at the École des Mines de Paris, and a member of the Centre de Sociologie de l'Innovation in Paris, France.

== Life ==
Fabian Muniesa (born 16 October 1972 in Madrid, Spain) received high school education at the Lycée Français de Madrid, in Spain. He graduated (sociology) from the Universidad Complutense de Madrid (Facultad de Ciencias Políticas y Sociología) in 1996, and obtained a master's degree in that same institution in 1998. Notable mentors and influences in this institution included Ignacio Gómez de Liaño, Jesús Ibáñez, and Ramón Ramos Torre. He then joined the Centre National d'Études des Télécommunications in France, enrolling simultaneously in the doctoral programme of Centre de Sociologie de l'Innovation, at the École des Mines de Paris, and completing a doctoral dissertation in 2003 (on the automation of the Paris Bourse). After a year working as a post-doctoral researcher at the London School of Economics (Department of Information Systems), he returned to Paris with an international grant from the city's municipal government. He obtained a permanent position at the École des Mines de Paris in 2005, becoming there a collaborator of Michel Callon and Bruno Latour. In 2010, he obtained an ERC Starting Grant. In 2011, he obtained a research habilitation from the Université Paris Dauphine.

== Work ==
Fabian Muniesa's academic work is focused on the anthropological critique of the culture of capitalism and on the study of the troubles of economic meaning. An early contributor to the social studies of finance, his work has been featured in academic outlets such as the Journal of Cultural Economy, Distinktion, and Economy and Society. Major contributions include the development of an approach to economic performativity inspired by the philosophy of Gilles Deleuze and Bruno Latour (his 2014 book The Provoked Economy), and the examination of the paranoid potentials of contemporary notions of financial value (his 2024 book Paranoid Finance).

Literary work by Fabian Muniesa includes a collection of poems in Spanish, published in 2023, titled Barrena. His approach to literature is marked by the influence of Roberto Bolaño.

== Notable publications ==
=== Academic work ===
- Muniesa, Fabian (2014). The Provoked Economy: Economic Reality and the Performative Turn. Abingdon: Routledge. ISBN 9780415857130.
- Muniesa, Fabian (2024). Paranoid Finance. Cambridge: Polity. ISBN 9781509561162.
- Muniesa, Fabian (2023). "A science of stereotypes: paranoiac-critical forays within the medium of information". Distinktion: Journal of Social Theory. 24 (2): 283–296. doi:10.1080/1600910X.2023.2235634.
- Muniesa, Fabian (2017). "On the political vernaculars of value creation". Science as Culture. 26 (4): 445–454. doi:10.1080/09505431.2017.1354847.
- Muniesa, Fabian (2017). "The live act of business and the culture of realization". HAU: Journal of Ethnographic Theory. 7 (3): 347–362. doi:10.14318/hau7.3.019.
- Muniesa, Fabian (2011). "A flank movement in the understanding of valuation". The Sociological Review. 59 (2_suppl): 24–38. doi:10.1111/j.1467-954X.2012.02056.x.
- Muniesa, Fabian (2007). "Market technologies and the pragmatics of prices". Economy and Society. 36 (3): 377–395. doi:10.1080/03085140701428340.

=== Poetry ===
- Muniesa, Fabián (2023). Barrena (in European Spanish). Santiago de Chile: Ril Editores. ISBN 978-84-19372-96-3.
