= Diana Taylor (professor) =

American academic (born 1950)

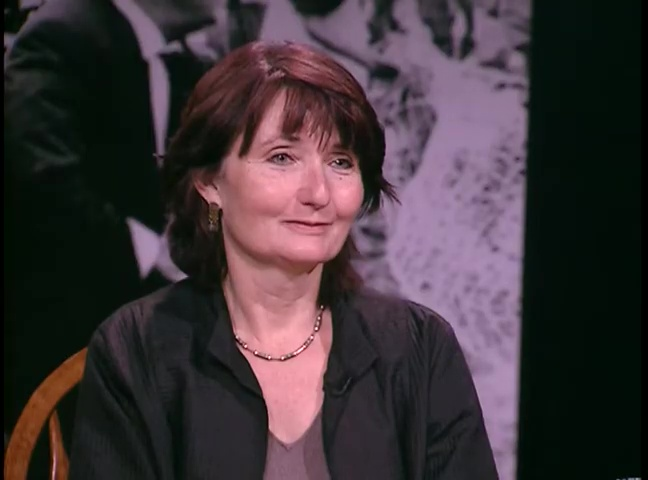
Taylor on CUNY TV's City Cinematheque, 2004

Diana Taylor is a University Professor of Performance Studies and Spanish at New York University' s Tisch School of the Arts and the founding director of the Hemispheric Institute of Performance and Politics. She was also the president of the Modern Language Association (MLA) in 2017–2018. Her work focuses on Latin American and U.S. theatre and performance, performance and politics, feminist theatre and performance in the Americas, Hemispheric studies, and trauma studies.

== Personal life ==
Born in Canada and raised in Mexico, Taylor graduated from the Universidad de las Américas, A.C., where she earned a bachelor of arts degree in creative writing in 1971, and another degree from Aix-Marseille University in France. She earned a master's degree from the National Autonomous University of Mexico in 1974 and a PhD from the University of Washington in 1981, both in comparative literature.

She is married to Eric Manheimer, former New York Bellevue Hospital medical director and later writer and producer of the NBC television show New Amsterdam.

== Career ==
Taylor taught at Dartmouth College from 1982 to 1997 before joining the faculty at New York University, where she is a University Professor of Performance Studies and Spanish at the Tisch School of the Arts. Taylor is also the founder and former director of the Hemispheric Institute of Performance and Politics, a leading center for research and collaboration across the Americas.

She served as the second vice president of the Modern Language Association (MLA) beginning in 2014 and was president of the organization from 2017 to 2018.

Taylor’s research explores the intersection of performance, memory, and social justice in the Americas. Her book Theatre of Crisis received the Best Book Award from the New England Council on Latin American Studies, and her work The Archive and the Repertoire earned both the Outstanding Book Award from the Association of Theatre in Higher Education and the Kathleen Singer Kovacs Award from the MLA.

Over the course of her career, Taylor has received numerous fellowships and honors recognizing her scholarly and creative contributions, including a John Simon Guggenheim Fellowship, two Rockefeller Foundation Fellowships, Mellon Foundation support, and an American Council of Learned Societies (ACLS) Digital Innovation Fellowship. She also held a Research Fellowship at the Institut d’Études Avancées de Paris.

In recognition of her impact on the field, Taylor was inducted into the American Academy of Arts and Sciences and received the Edwin Booth Award for her outstanding contribution to the New York City theatre community and her efforts to bridge academic and professional theatre. In 2025, she was elected an International Fellow of the British Academy and awarded a National Endowment for the Humanities (NEH) Digital Publication Fellowship. In 2026, she was selected to receive the Rodolfo Usigli Medal granted by the Rodolfo Usigli National Center for Theater Research, Documentation, and Information (CITRU) of the National Institute of Fine Arts and Literature (INBAL) of the Government of Mexico, and the Department of Literature at the Universidad Iberoamericana in Mexico City.

== Works ==
=== Books ===
- ¡Presente! The Politics of Presence
- Performance, politica e memoria culturale
- Performance
- Acciones de memoria: Performance, historia, y trauma
- The Archive and the Repertoire: Performing Cultural Memory in the Americas
- Theatre of Crisis: Drama and Politics in Latin America
- Disappearing Acts: Spectacles of Gender and Nationalism in Argentina's 'Dirty War'

=== Edited and Co-Edited Books ===
- Crossings: Living between Languages and Varied Imagination
- Resistant Strategies
- What is Performance Studies?
- Dancing with the Zapatistas: 20 Years Later
- Estudios avanzados de Performance
- From Memory to History: Walking through Villa Grimaldi
- Stages of Conflict: A Reader of Latin American Theatre and Performance
- Holy Terrors: Latin American Women Performance
- Defiant Acts: Four Plays by Diana Raznovich
- Negotiating Performance in Latin/o America: Gender, Sexuality and Theatricality
- The Politics of Motherhood: Activists from Left to Right
- The Representation of Otherness in Chicano and Latin American Theatre and Film
- En busca de una imagen: Ensayos sobre el teatro de Griselda Gambaro y José Triana
- Fernando Arrabal: El arquitecto y el emperador de asiria y Cementerio de automoviles
