= Performativity =

Linguistic quality

Performativity is the concept that language can function as a form of social action and have the effect of change. The concept has multiple applications in diverse fields such as anthropology, social and cultural geography, economics, gender studies (social construction of gender), law, linguistics, performance studies, history, management studies and philosophy.

The concept is first described by philosopher of language John L. Austin when he referred to a specific capacity: the capacity of speech and communication to act or to consummate an action. Austin differentiated this from constative language, which he defined as descriptive language that can be "evaluated as true or false". Common examples of performative language are making promises, betting, performing a wedding ceremony, an umpire calling a foul, or a judge pronouncing a verdict.

The concept of performance has been developed by such scholars as Richard Schechner, Victor Turner, Clifford Geertz, Erving Goffman, John Austin, John Searle, Pierre Bourdieu, Stern and Henderson, and Judith Butler.

== Defining performance ==
Performance is a bodily practice that produces meaning. It is the presentation or 're-actualization' of symbolic systems through living bodies as well as lifeless mediating objects, such as architecture. In the academic field, as opposed to the domain of the performing arts, the concept of performance is generally used to highlight dynamic interactions between social actors or between a social actor and their immediate environment.

Performance is an equivocal concept and for the purpose of analysis it is useful to distinguish between two senses of 'performance'. In the more formal sense, performance refers to a framed event. Performance in this sense is an enactment out of convention and tradition. Founder of the discipline of performance studies Richard Schechner dubs this category 'is-performance'. In a weaker sense, performance refers to the informal scenarios of daily life, suggesting that everyday practices are 'performed'. Schechner called this the 'as-performance'. Generally the performative turn is concerned with the latter, although the two senses of performance should be seen as ends of a spectrum rather than distinct categories.

== History ==
The performative turn is a paradigmatic shift in the humanities and social sciences that affected such disciplines as anthropology, archaeology, linguistics, ethnography, history and the relatively young discipline of performance studies. Previously used as a metaphor for theatricality, performance is now often employed as a heuristic principle to understand human behaviour. The assumption is that all human practices are 'performed', so that any action at whatever moment or location can be seen as a public presentation of the self. This methodological approach entered the social sciences and humanities in the 1990s but is rooted in the 1940s and 1950s. Underlying the performative turn was the need to conceptualize how human practices relate to their contexts in a way that went beyond the traditional sociological methods that did not problematize representation. Instead of focusing solely on given symbolic structures and texts, scholars stress the active, social construction of reality as well as the way that individual behaviour is determined by the context in which it occurs. Performance functions both as a metaphor and an analytical tool and thus provides a perspective for framing and analysing social and cultural phenomena.

=== Origins ===
The origins of the performative turn can be traced back to two strands of theorizing about performance as a social category that surfaced in the 1940s and 1950s.

The first strand is anthropological in origin and may be labelled the dramaturgical model. Kenneth Burke (1945) expounded a 'dramatistic approach' to analyse the motives underlying such phenomena as communicative actions and the history of philosophy. Anthropologist Victor Turner focused on cultural expression in staged theatre and ritual. In his highly influential The Presentation of Self in Everyday Life (1959), Erving Goffman emphasized the link between social life and performance by stating that 'the theatre of performances is in public acts'. Within the performative turn, the dramaturgical model evolved from the classical concept of 'society as theatre' into a broader category that considers all culture as performance.

The second strand of theory concerns a development in the philosophy of language launched by John Austin in the 1950s. In How to do things with words he introduced the concept of the 'performative utterance', opposing the prevalent principle that declarative sentences are always statements that can be either true or false. Instead he argued that 'to say something is to do something'. In the 1960s John Searle extended this concept to the broader field of speech act theory, where due attention is paid to the use and function of language. In the 1970s Searle engaged in polemics with postmodern philosopher Jacques Derrida, about the determinability of context and the nature of authorial intentions in a performative text.

The performative turn is anchored in the broader cultural development of postmodernism. An influential current in modern thought, postmodernism is a radical reappraisal of the assumed certainty and objectivity of scientific efforts to represent and explain reality. Postmodern scholars argue that society itself both defines and constructs reality through experience, representation and performance. From the 1970s onwards, the concept of performance was integrated into a variety of theories in the humanities and social sciences, such as phenomenology, critical theory (the Frankfurt school), semiotics, Lacanian psychoanalysis, deconstructionism and feminism. The conceptual shift became manifest in a methodology oriented towards culture as a dynamic phenomenon as well as in the focus on subjects of study that were neglected before, such as everyday life. For scholars, the concept of performance is a means to come to grips with human agency and to better understand the way social life is constructed.

=== J. L. Austin ===
The term derives from the founding work in speech act theory by ordinary language philosopher J. L. Austin. In the 1950s, Austin gave the name performative utterances to situations where saying something was doing something, rather than simply reporting on or describing reality. The paradigmatic case here is speaking the words "I do". Austin did not use the word performativity.

Breaking with analytic philosophy, Austin argued in How to Do Things With Words that a "performative utterance" cannot be said to be either true or false as a constative utterance might be: it can only be judged either "happy" or "infelicitous" depending upon whether the conditions required for its success have been met. In this sense, performativity is a function of the pragmatics of language. Having shown that all utterances perform actions, even apparently constative ones, Austin famously discarded the distinction between "performative" and "constative" utterances halfway through the lecture series that became the book and replaced it with a three-level framework:

- locution (the actual words spoken, that which the linguists and linguistic philosophers of the day were mostly interested in analyzing)
- illocutionary force (what the speaker is attempting to do in uttering the locution)
- perlocutionary effect (the actual effect the speaker actually has on the interlocutor by uttering the locution)

For example, if a speech act is an attempt to distract someone, the illocutionary force is the attempt to distract and the perlocutionary effect is the actual distraction caused by the speech act in the interlocutor.

==== Influence of Austin ====
Austin's account of performativity has been subject to extensive discussion in philosophy, literature, and beyond. Jacques Derrida, Shoshana Felman, Judith Butler, and Eve Kosofsky Sedgwick are among the scholars who have elaborated upon and contested aspects of Austin's account from the vantage point of deconstruction, psychoanalysis, feminism, and queer theory. Particularly in the work of feminists and queer theorists, performativity has played an important role in discussions of social change (Oliver 2003).

The concept of performativity has also been used in science and technology studies and in economic sociology. Andrew Pickering has proposed to shift from a "representational idiom" to a "performative idiom" in the study of science. Michel Callon has proposed to study the performative aspects of economics, i.e. the extent to which economic science plays an important role not only in describing markets and economies, but also in framing them. Karen Barad has argued that science and technology studies deemphasize the performativity of language in order to explore the performativity of matter (Barad 2003).

Other uses of the notion of performativity in the social sciences include the daily behavior (or performance) of individuals based on social norms or habits. Philosopher and feminist theorist Judith Butler has used the concept of performativity in their analysis of gender development, as well as in analysis of political speech. Eve Kosofsky Sedgwick describes queer performativity as an ongoing project for transforming the way we may define—and break—boundaries to identity. Through her suggestion that shame is a potentially performative and transformational emotion, Sedgwick has also linked queer performativity to affect theory. Also innovative in Sedgwick's discussion of the performative is what she calls periperformativity (2003: 67–91), which is effectively the group contribution to the success or failure of a speech act.

== Elaborations ==
=== John Searle ===
In A Taxonomy of Illocutionary Acts, John Searle takes up and reformulates the ideas of his colleague J. L. Austin. Though Searle largely supports and agrees with Austin's theory of speech acts, he has a number of critiques, which he outlines: "In sum, there are (at least) six related difficulties with Austin's taxonomy; in ascending order of importance: there is a persistent confusion between verbs and acts, not all the verbs are illocutionary verbs, there is too much overlap of the categories, too much heterogeneity within the categories, many of the verbs listed in the categories don't satisfy the definition given for the category and, most important, there is no consistent principle of classification."

His last key departure from Austin lies in Searle's claim that four of his universal 'acts' do not need 'extra-linguistic' contexts to succeed. As opposed to Austin who thinks all illocutionary acts need extra-linguistic institutions, Searle disregards the necessity of context and replaces it with the "rules of language".

=== Jean-François Lyotard ===
In The Postmodern Condition: A Report on Knowledge (1979, English translation 1986), philosopher and cultural theorist Jean-François Lyotard defined performativity as the defining mode of legitimation of postmodern knowledge and social bonds, that is, power. In contrast to the legitimation of modern knowledge through such grand narratives as Progress, Revolution, and Liberation, performativity operates by system optimization or the calculation of input and outputs. In a footnote, Lyotard aligns performativity with Austin's concept of performative speech act. Postmodern knowledge must not only report: it must do something and do it efficiently by maximizing input/output ratios.

Lyotard uses Wittgenstein's notion of language games to theorize how performativity governs the articulation, funding, and conduct of contemporary research and education, arguing that at bottom it involves the threat of terror: "be operational (that is commensurable) or disappear" (xxiv). While Lyotard is highly critical of performativity, he notes that it calls on researchers to explain not only the worth of their work but also the worth of that worth.

Lyotard associated performativity with the rise of digital computers in the post-World War II period. In Postwar: A History of Europe Since 1945, historian Tony Judt cites Lyotard to argue that the Left has largely abandoned revolutionary politics for human rights advocacy. The widespread adoption of performance reviews, organizational assessments, and learning outcomes by different social institutions worldwide has led social researchers to theorize "audit culture" and "global performativity".

Against performativity and Jürgen Habermas' call for consensus, Lyotard argued for legitimation by paralogy, or the destabilizing, often paradoxical, introduction of difference into language games

=== Jacques Derrida ===
Philosopher Jacques Derrida drew on Austin's theory of performative speech act while deconstructing its logocentric and phonocentric premises and reinscribing it within the operations of generalized writing. In contrast to structuralism's focus on linguistic form, Austin had introduced the force of speech acts, which Derrida aligns with Nietzsche's insights on language.

In "Signature, Event, Context," Derrida focused on Austin's privileging of speech and the accompanying presumptions of the presence of a speaker ("signature") and the bounding of a performative's force by an act or a context. In a passage that would become a touchstone of poststructuralist thought, Derrida stresses the citationality or iterability of any and all signs.

Every sign, linguistic or nonlinguistic, spoken or written (in the current sense of this opposition), in a small or large unit, can be cited, put between quotation marks; in doing so it can break with every given context, engendering an infinity of new contexts in a manner which is absolutely illimitable. This does not imply that the mark is valid outside of a context, but on the contrary that there are only contexts without any center or absolute anchorage [ancrage]. This citationality, this duplication or duplicity, this iterability of the mark is neither an accident nor an anomaly, it is that (normal/abnormal) without which a mark could not even have a function called "normal." What would a mark be that could not be cited? Or one whose origins would not get lost along the way?

Derrida's stress on the citational dimension of performativity would be taken up by Judith Butler and other theorists. While he addressed the performativity of individual subject formation, Derrida also raised such questions as whether we can mark when the event of the Russian revolution went awry, thus scaling up the field of performativity to historical dimensions.

=== Judith Butler ===
The philosopher and feminist theorist Judith Butler offered a new, more Continental (specifically, Foucauldian) reading of the notion of performativity, which has its roots in linguistics and philosophy of language. They describe performativity as "that reiterative power of discourse to produce the phenomena that it regulates and constrains." It is an anti-essentialist theory of subjectivity in which a performance of the self is repeated and dependent upon a social audience. In this way, these unfixed and precarious performances come to have the appearance of substance and continuity.

A key theoretical point that was most radical in regards to theories of subjectivity and performance is that there is no performer behind the performance. Butler derived this idea from Nietzsche's concept of "no doer behind the deed." This is to say that there is no self before the performance of the self, but rather that the performance has constitutive powers. This is how categories of the self for Butler, such as gender, are seen as something that one "does," rather than something one "is." They have largely used this concept in their analysis of gender development.

Influenced by Austin, Butler argued that gender is socially constructed through commonplace speech acts and nonverbal communications that are performative, in that they serve to define and maintain identities. This view of performativity reverses the idea that a person's identity is the source of their secondary actions (speech, gestures). Instead, it views actions, behaviors, and gestures as both the result of an individual's identity as well as a source that contributes to the formation of one's identity which is continuously being redefined through speech acts and symbolic communication. This view was influenced by philosophers such as Michel Foucault and Louis Althusser.

The concept places emphasis on the manners by which identity is passed or brought to life through discourse. Performative acts are types of authoritative speech. This can only happen and be enforced through the law or norms of the society. These statements, just by speaking them, carry out a certain action and exhibit a certain level of power. Examples of these types of statements are declarations of ownership, baptisms, inaugurations, and legal sentences. Something that is key to performativity is repetition. The statements are not singular in nature or use and must be used consistently in order to exert power.

== Various applications ==
Performance offers a tremendous interdisciplinary archive of social practices. It offers methods to study such phenomena as body art, ecological theatre, multimedia performance and other kinds of performance arts.

Performance also provides a new registry of kinaesthetic effects, enabling a more conscientious observation of the moving body. The changing experience of movement, for example as a result of new technologies, has become an important subject of research.

Moreover, the performative turn has helped scholars to develop an awareness of the relations between everyday life and stage performances. For example, at conferences and lectures, on the street and in other places where people speak in public, performers tend to use techniques derived from the world of theatre and dance.

Performance allows us to study nature and other apparently 'immovable' and 'objectified' elements of the human environment (e.g. architecture) as active agents, rather than only as passive objects. Thus, in recent decades environmental scholars have acknowledged the existence of a fluid interaction between man and nature.

The performative turn has provided additional tools to study everyday life. A household for example may be considered as a performance, in which the relation between wife and husband is a role play between two actors.

=== Economics and finance ===
In economics, the "performativity thesis" is the claim that the assumptions and models used by professionals and popularizers affect the phenomena they purport to describe; bringing the world more into line with theory. It also refers, more largely, to the idea of economic reality as a ceaselessly provoked reality and of things such as performance indicators, valuation formulas, consumer tests, stock prices or financial contracts constituting what they refer to. This theory was developed by Michel Callon in The Laws of the Markets, before being further developed in Do Economists Make Markets edited by Donald Angus MacKenzie, Fabian Muniesa and Lucia Siu, and in Enacting Dismal Science edited by Ivan Boldyrev and Ekaterina Svetlova. The most important work in the field is that of Donald MacKenzie and Yuval Millo on the social construction of financial markets. In a seminal article, they showed that the option pricing theory called BSM (Black-Scholes-Merton) has been successful empirically not because of the discovery of preexisting price regularities, but because participants used it to set option prices, so that it made itself true.

The thesis of performativity of economics has been extensively criticized by Nicolas Brisset in Economics and Performativity. Brisset defends the idea that the notion of performativity used by Callonian and Latourian sociologists leads to an overly relativistic view of the social world. Drawing on the work of John Austin and David Lewis, Brisset theorizes the idea of limits to performativity. To do this, Brisset considers that a theory, in order to be "performative", must become a convention. This requires conditions to be met. To take a convention status, a theory will have to:

- Provide social actors with a representation of their social world allowing them to choose among several actions ("Empiricity" condition);
- Indicate an option considered relevant when the agreement is generalised ("self-fulfilling" condition);
- Be compatible with all the conventions constituting the social environment ("Coherency" condition);

Based on this framework, Brisset criticized the seminal work of MacKenzie and Millo on the performativity of the Black–Scholes–Merton financial model. Drawing on the work of Pierre Bourdieu, Brisset also uses the notion of Speech Act to study economic models and their use in political power relations.

MacKenzie's approach was also criticized by Uskali Maki for not using the concept of performativity in accordance with Austin's formulation. This point gave rise to a debate in economic philosophy.

=== Gender studies ===
Judith Butler theorized gender as constructed by repeated acts. Acts that people come to perform in the mode of belief which cite existing norms, analogous to a script. Butler sees gender not as an expression of what one is but as something that one does. The appearance of a gendered essence is merely a "performative accomplishment". Furthermore, they do not see it as socially imposed on a self that is prior to gender, as the self is not distinct from the categories which constitute it. According to Butler's theory, homosexuality and heterosexuality are not fixed categories: a person is merely in a condition of "doing straightness" or "doing queerness," where these categories are not natural but historical and socially constititued. For Butler, "the distinction between the personal and the political or between private and public is itself a fiction designed to support an oppressive status quo: our most personal acts are, in fact, continually being scripted by hegemonic social conventions and ideologies".

For Amelia Jones, this mode of viewing gender offered a way to move beyond the theories of the male gaze in feminist art criticism. She suggests that taking into account the subversive potential of performative acts offers ways to consider images as something beyond inanimate objects for male visual pleasure.

Nonetheless, several criticisms have been raised regarding Butler's reading of performativity. Martha Nussbaum has argued that Butler misreads Austin and neglects the material reality of gender oppression. Another criticism is that Butler possibly overlooks the unplanned effects of performative acts and the contingencies surrounding them.

Scholars in the field of sociology observe that Butler's theory might be better suited to literary analysis as opposed to social theory. It has also been suggested that the concept of gender performativity offers little new insight when compared to existing ethnomethodological and symbolic interactionist frameworks.

=== Management studies ===
In management, the concept of performativity has also been mobilized, relying on its diverse conceptualizations (Austin, Barad, Barnes, Butler, Callon, Derrida, Lyotard, etc.).

In the study of management theories, performativity shows how actors use theories, how they produce effects on organizational practices and how these effects shape these practices.

For instance, by building on Michel Callon's perspective, the concept of performativity has been mobilized to show how the concept of Blue Ocean Strategy transformed organizational practices.

=== Journalism ===
The German news anchorman Hanns Joachim Friedrichs once argued that a good journalist should never act in collusion with anything, not even with a good thing. In the evening of November 9, 1989, the evening of the fall of the Berlin Wall, however, Friedrichs reportedly broke his own rule when he announced: "The gates of the wall are wide open." („Die Tore in der Mauer stehen weit offen.”) In reality, the gates were still closed. According to a historian, it was this announcement that encouraged thousands of East Berliners to march towards the wall, finally forcing the border guards to open the gates. In the sense of performativity, Friedrichs's words became a reality.

=== Video art ===
Theories of performativity have extended across multiple disciplines and discussions. Notably, interdisciplinary theorist José Esteban Muñoz has related video to theories of performativity. Specifically, Muñoz looks at the 1996 documentary by Susana Aiken and Carlos Aparicio, "The Transformation."

Although historically and theoretically related to performance art, video art is not an immediate performance; it is mediated, iterative and citational. In this way, video art raises questions of performativity. Additionally, video art frequently puts bodies and display, complicating borders, surfaces, embodiment, and boundaries and so indexing performativity.

== Issues and debates ==
Despite cogent attempts at definition, the concept of performance continues to be plagued by ambiguities. Most pressing seems to be the paradox between performance as the consequence of following a script (cf. Schechners restored behaviour) and performance as a fluid activity with ample room for improvisation. Another problem involves the discrepancy between performance as a human activity that constructs culture (e.g. Butler and Derrida) on the one hand and performance as a representation of culture on the other (e.g. Bourdieu and Schechner). Another issue, important to pioneers such as Austin but now deemed irrelevant by postmodernism, concerns the sincerity of the actor. Can performance be authentic, or is it a product of pretence?

== Related concepts ==
=== Performance studies ===
Performance studies emerged through the work of, among others, theatre director and scholar Richard Schechner, who applied the notion of performance to human behaviour beyond the performing arts. His interpretation of performance as non-artistic yet expressive social behaviour and his collaboration in 1985 with anthropologist Victor Turner led to the beginning of performance studies as a separate discipline. Schechner defines performance as 'restored behaviour', to emphasize the symbolic and coded aspects of culture. Schechner understands performance as a continuum. Not everything is meant to be a performance, but everything, from performing arts to politics and economics, can be studied as performance.

=== Habitus ===
In the 1970s, Pierre Bourdieu introduced the concept of 'habitus' or regulated improvisation, in a reaction against the structuralist notion of culture as a system of rules (Bourdieu 1972). Culture in his perspective undergoes a shift from 'a productive to a reproductive social order in which simulations and models constitute the world so that the distinction between real and appearance becomes erased'. Though Bourdieu himself does not often employ the term 'performance', the notion of the bodily habitus as a formative site has been a source of inspiration for performance theorists.

=== Occasionalism ===
The cultural historian Peter Burke suggested using the term 'occasionalism' to stress the implication of the idea of performance that '[...] on different occasions or in different situations the same person behaves in different ways'.

=== Non-representational theory ===
Within the social sciences and humanities, an interdisciplinary strand that has contributed to the performative turn is non-representational theory. It is a 'theory of practices' that focuses on repetitive ways of expression, such as speech and gestures. As opposed to representational theory, it argues that human conduct is a result of linguistic interplay rather than of codes and symbols that are consciously planned. Non-representational theory interprets actions and events, such as dance or theatre, as actualisations of knowledge. It also intends to shift the focus away from the technical aspects of representation, to the practice itself.

== See also ==
- Dramaturgy (sociology)
- Erving Goffman
- Frame analysis
- John Searle
- Performance
- Performance studies
- Performative text
- Performative utterances
- Speech act

== Bibliography and further reading ==
- Austin, J. L. 1962. How to Do Things with Words. Oxford: Clarendon Press.
- Austin, J. L. 1970. "Performative Utterances." In Austin, "Philosophical Papers", 233–52. London: Oxford University Press.
- Bakhtin, Mikhail. "Discourse in the Novel", The dialogic imagination : four essays; edited by Michael Holquist; translated by Caryl Emerson and Michael Holquist Austin: University of Texas Press, c1981.
- Bamberg, M., Narrative. State of the Art (2007).
- Barad, Karen. 2003. "Posthumanist Performativity: Toward and Understanding of How Matter Comes to Matter." Signs: Journal of Women in Culture and Society 28.3: 801–831.
- Boldyrev, Ivan and Svetlova, Ekaterina. 2016. Enacting Dismal Science: New Perspectives on the Performativity of Economics. Basingstoke: Palgrave Macmillan.
- Bourdieu, P., Outlines of a Theory of Practice (Cambridge 1972).
- Burke, Peter, 'Performing history: the importance of occasions', in: Rethinking history 9 afl. 1 (2005), pp. 35–52.
- Brickell, Chris. 2005. "Masculinities, Performativity, and Subversion: A Sociological Reappraisal." Men and Masculinities 8.1: 24–43.
- Brisset, Nicolas. 2017. "On performativity: Option Theory and the Resistance of Financial Phenomena". Journal of the History of Economic Thought. 39(4) : 549–569. DOI: https://doi.org/10.1017/S1053837217000128
- Brisset, Nicolas. 2019. Economics and Performativity. Exploring limits, Theories and Cases. Routledge INEM Advances in Economic Methodology.
- Butler, Judith. 1993. Bodies that Matter. On the Discursive Limits of Sex. London and New York: Routledge.
- Butler, Judith. 1997. Excitable Speech: A Politics of the Performative. London and New York: Routledge.
- Butler, Judith. 2000. "Critically Queer", in Identity: A Reader. London: Sage Publications.
- Butler, Judith. 2010. "Performative Agency", in Journal of Cultural Economy 3:2, 147–161. doi:10.1080/17530350.2010.494117.
- Callon, Michel. 1998. "Introduction: the Embeddedness of Economic Markets in Economics". In M. Callon (ed.), The Laws of the Markets. Oxford: Blackwell.
- Carlson, M., Performance: A Critical Introduction (London 1996).
- Chaney, D., Fictions of Collective Life (London 1993).
- Crane, M. T. 'What was performance?', in: Criticism 43, afl. 2 (2001), pp. 169–187.
- Davidson, M., Ghostlier Demarcations. Modern Poetry and the Material Word (Berkeley 1997).
- Davis, T. C., The Cambridge Companion to Performance Studies (Illinois 2008).
- Derrida, Jacques. 1971. "Signature, Event, Context", in Limited, inc., Evanston: Northwestern Univ. Press, 1988.
- Dirksmeier, P & I. Helbrecht, 'Time, Non-representational Theory and the "Performative Turn"—Towards a New Methodology in Qualitative Social Research', Forum: Qualitative Social Research 9 (2008), pp. 1–24.
- Dunn, R.G. 1997. "Self, Identity and Difference: Mead and the Poststructuralists." Sociological Quarterly 38.4: 687–705.
- Farnell, B., 'Moving Bodies: acting selves', Annual Review in Anthropology 28 (1999), pp. 341–373.
- Felluga, Dino. "Modules on Butler". Retrieved on 10/30/06 from Modules on Butler II: Performativity.
- Felman, Shoshana. 1980/2003. The Scandal of the Speaking Body: Don Juan With J.L. Austin, or Seduction in Two Languages. Translated by Catherine Porter. Stanford: Stanford University Press.
- Garfinkel, Harold. 1967. Studies in Ethnomethodology. Englewood Cliffs, NJ: Prentice Hall.
- Geertz, C., Negara: the Theatre State in Nineteenth-Century Bali (Princeton 1980).
- Glass, Michael & Rose-Redwood, Reuben. 2014. Performativity, Politics, and the Production of Social Space. New York: Routledge.
- Goffman, Erving. 1959. The Presentation of Self in Everyday Life. Garden City, NY: Anchor.
- Goffman, Erving. 1976. "Gender Display" and "Gender Commercials." Gender Advertisements. New York: Harper and Row.
- Goffman, Erving. 1983. "Frame Analysis of Talk." The Goffman Reader, Lemert and Branaman, eds., Blackwell, 1997.
- Green, Adam Isaiah. 2007. "Queer Theory and Sociology: Locating the Subject and the Self in Sexuality Studies." Sociological Theory 25.1: 26–45.
- Green, B., Spectacular Confession: Autobiography, Performative Activism and the Sites of Suffrage, 1905–1938 (London 1997).
- Hall, Stuart. 2000. "Who Needs Identity?" In Identity: A Reader. London: Sage Publications.
- Hawkes, David. 2020. The Reign of Anti-logos: Performance in Postmodernity (Palgrave Insights into Apocalypse Economics), London and New York: Palgrave Macmillan.
- Hymes, D., 'Breakthrough into performance', in: D. Ben-Amos and K.S. Goldstein (eds.) Folklore: Performance and Communication (The Hague 1975).
- Ingold, T., 'The temporality of Landscape'. World Archeology 25 (1993), pp. 152–174.
- Kapchan, D., 'Performance' in: Journal of American Folklore 108, pp. 479–508.
- Kessler, Suzanne, and Wendy McKenna. 1978. Gender: An Ethnomethodological Approach. Chicago: University of Chicago Press.
- Kulick, Don (April 2003). "No". Language & Communication. 23 (2): 139–151. doi:10.1016/S0271-5309(02)00043-5. Pdf.
- Lloyd, Moya. 1999. "Performativity, Parody, Politics", Theory, Culture & Society, 16(2), 195–213.
- McKenzie, J., 'Performance studies', The Johns Hopkins Guide to Literary Theory and Criticism (2005).
- Matynia, Elzbieta. 2009. Performative Democracy. Boulder: Paradigm.
- Membretti, Andrea. 2009. "Per un uso performativo delle immagini nella ricerca-azione sociale", Lo Squaderno n.12 (http://www.losquaderno.professionaldreamers.net/?p=1101)
- McKenzie, Jon. "Perform or Else: From Discipline to Performance." London: Routledge, 2001.
- McKenzie, Jon, Heike Roms, and C. J. Wan-ling. Wee. "Contesting Performance: Global Sites of Research." Basingstoke, UK: Palgrave Macmillan, 2010.
- Muñoz, Performing Disidentifications. Disidentifications: Queers of Color and the Performance of Politics. 1999.
- Oliver, Kelly. 2003. "What Is Transformative about the Performative? From Repetition to Working Through." In Ann Cahill and Jennifer Hansen, eds., Continental Feminism Reader.
- Parker and Sedgwick, Introduction: Performativity and Performance. Performativity and Performance. 1995.
- Pickering, Andrew. 1995. The Mangle of Practice: Time, Agency and Science. Chicago: University of Chicago Press.
- Porter, J.N., 'Review Postmodernism by Mike Featherstone', Contemporary sociology 19 (1990) 323.
- Robinson, Douglas. 2003. Performative Linguistics: Speaking and Translating as Doing Things With Words. London and New York: Routledge.
- Robinson, Douglas. 2006. Introducing Performative Pragmatics. London and New York: Routledge.
- Roudavski, Stanislav. 2008. Staging Places as Performances: Creative Strategies for Architecture (PhD, University of Cambridge)
- Rosaldo, Michele. 1980. The things we do with words: Ilongot speech acts and speech act theory in philosophy. Language in Society 11: 203–237.
- Schechner, Richard, Performance Studies. An Introduction (New York 2006).
- Schieffelin, E., 'Problematising Performance', in: Hughes-Freeland, F., (ed) Ritual, Performance, Media (London 1998), pp. 194–207.
- Searle, John. 1969. "Speech Acts: An Essay in the Philosophy of Language". Cambridge: Cambridge University Press.
- Sedgwick, Eve Kosovsky. 2003. Touching Feeling: Affect, Pedagogy, Performativity. Durham, NC: Duke University Press.
- Stern and Henderson, Performance: Texts and Contexts (Londen 1993).
- Thrift, N. en J. Dewsbury, 'Dead geographies – and how to make them live', Environment and Planning D: Society and Space 18 (2000), pp. 411–432.
- Thrift, N. J., 'The still point: resistance, expressive embodiment and dance', in: Pile, S. (ed), Geographies of Resistance (London 1997), pp. 125–151.
- Thrift, N. J., Spatial Formations (London 1996).
- Weiss, B., The Making and Unmaking of the Haya Lived World: Consumption, Commodization, and Everyday Practise (Durham 1996).
- Wells, P., Understanding Animation (London 1998).
- West, Candace and Don Zimmerman. 1987. "Doing Gender." Gender and Society 1.2: 121–151.
