= Donald MacKenzie (sociologist) =

British sociologist (born 1950)

Professor Donald MacKenzie FBA FRSE FAcSS
- Born: Donald Angus MacKenzie; 3 May 1950 (age 76)
- Awards: 1993 Robert K. Merton Award of the American Sociological Association

Academic background
- Education: The University of Edinburgh

Academic work
- Main interests: Social studies of technology

Donald Angus MacKenzie (born 3 May 1950) is a professor of sociology at the University of Edinburgh, Scotland. His work constitutes a crucial contribution to the field of science and technology studies. He has also developed research in the field of social studies of finance. He has undertaken widely cited work on the history of statistics, eugenics, nuclear weapons, computing and finance, among other things.

In 1978 he earned a PhD from the University of Edinburgh for his thesis on the development of statistical theory in Britain.

In August 2006, MacKenzie was awarded the Chancellor's Award from Prince Philip, Duke of Edinburgh and Chancellor of the University of Edinburgh, for his contributions to the field of science and technology studies. He is also the winner of the 1993 Robert K. Merton Award of the American Sociological Association and the 2005 John Desmond Bernal Prize of the Society for Social Studies of Science among many others.

== Books ==
- MacKenzie, Donald (1981). Statistics in Britain, 1865-1930: The Social Construction of Scientific Knowledge. Edinburgh: Edinburgh University Press. ISBN 9780852243695.
- MacKenzie, Donald; Wajcman, Judy (1985). The Social Shaping of Technology: How the Refrigerator Got Its Hum. Milton Keynes Philadelphia: Open University Press. ISBN 9780335150267.
- MacKenzie, Donald (13 December 1990). Inventing Accuracy: A Historical Sociology of Nuclear Missile Guidance (1st ed.). MIT Press. ISBN 978-0262132589. LCCN 90005915. OCLC 1068009953. OL 1854178M. Archived from the original on 22 November 2019.
- MacKenzie, Donald (1998). Knowing Machines: Essays on Technical Change. Cambridge, Massachusetts: MIT Press. ISBN 9780262631884.
- MacKenzie, Donald (2001). Mechanizing Proof: Computing, Risk, and Trust. Cambridge, Massachusetts: MIT Press. ISBN 9780585436739.
- MacKenzie, Donald (2006). An Engine, Not a Camera: How Financial Models Shape Markets. Cambridge, Massachusetts: MIT Press. ISBN 9781423774488.
- MacKenzie, Donald; Muniesa, Fabian; Siu, Lucia (2007). Do Economists Make Markets?: On the Performativity of Economics. Princeton: Princeton University Press. ISBN 9780691138497.
- MacKenzie, Donald (2009). Material Markets: How Economic Agents are Constructed. Oxford New York: Oxford University Press. ISBN 9780199278152.
- MacKenzie, Donald (2021). Trading at the Speed of Light: How Ultrafast Algorithms Are Transforming Financial Markets. Princeton University Press. ISBN 9780691211381.
