= Sarah Ortmeyer =

German artist

Sarah Ortmeyer (born in Frankfurt, Germany) is a German artist. Her work spans across classic artistic disciplines such as sculpture, painting and publishing, recurring to non-traditional modes of display. Ortmeyer has exhibited internationally at venues including the Stedelijk Museum voor Actuele Kunst, Belvedere21, Palais de Tokyo, MAK Center, KW Institute for Contemporary Art, MoMA PS1, Performance Space New York, the Swiss Institute and has published several books, including a comprehensive volume on chess, politics, and aesthetics.

== Early life and education ==
Ortmeyer was born in Frankfurt, Germany. She lived in Paris then moved to New York in 2008. She graduated from the University of Applied Arts in Vienna and from Städelschule, Academy of Fine Arts, Frankfurt am Main.

== Work ==
Ortmeyer creates a wide range of works that oscillate in their dimensions between small-scale and large-scale and has collaborated with artists, poets, rappers, and musicians from various disciplines and generations, including Friederike Mayröcker, Yoko Ono, and Lafawndah.

For her stay at Hotel Marienbad in 2009, a previous exhibition entity of the KW Institute of Contemporary Art, the artist turned the rooms into a "hallucinatory version" of the Eiffel Tower. The artist is currently banned from the Eiffel Tower.

In 2010, Ortmeyer showed at Lodz Biennale in Poland, 303 Gallery in New York, MAK Center for Art and Architecture in Los Angeles, and at the Museum of Modern Art Warsaw.

GRANDMASTERS WORLDCHAMPIONS is a 2012 artwork conceived specially at the Stedelijk Museum voor Actuele Kunst. A publication by the same title was made for the exhibition.

Ortmeyer showed at the Haus Wittgenstein in Vienna in 2013. That same year, the artist’s first solo exhibition in Italy, MACHO AMORE, was shown in Milan.

In 2014, Ortmeyer exhibited a sculpture series, titled SANKT PETERSBURG PARADOX, at the Swiss Institute in New York. Art critic Roberta Smith wrote for The New York Times that the artwork was, "a large, chaotic scatter piece involving numerous chessboards and several species of natural eggs, as if contrasting the elevated competition of board games with the dice toss of genetics."

Ortmeyer turned MoMA PS 1's Dome into a planetarium of egg-shaped stars within a grey-colored set for Valentine's Day in 2016. The third installment of her PALMA series was shown at the Belvedere 21 earlier that year.

In 2018, Ortmeyer was commissioned as an Associate Artist to develop a new visual identity and logo for Performance Space New York. During a studio visit with Milton Glaser, he "opened up her black heart painting with a scissor cut," birthing the iconic symbol. Later that year the silent movie FLYRT premiered at Kunstverein München, the result of Ortmeyer’s long lasting correspondence with a rising teen idol and rapper.

== Themes ==
Since 2010, chess has become one of the central themes in Ortmeyer’s art, starting with the ongoing GRANDMASTER series. Additional themes explored in Ortmeyer's work include eggs from her MONSTER series, icons from her EMOJI SHADOW series, the devil from her DIABOLUS collection, palm trees from her PALMA collection, and the heart from her COR collection.

Ortmeyer works in the dialectical relationship between emotions and knowledge and between life and politics. She has created artworks on sports icons and the subject of collecting, on the mystery of female chess world champions, on nature-derived motifs or the fashion style of Immanuel Kant.

== Public Collections ==
- Stedelijk Museum voor Actuele Kunst
- Austrian National Library
- Nationalgalerie
- Hamburger Bahnhof, Berlin
- Museum der Moderne, Salzburg
- Fonds régional d'art contemporain Grand-Large-Hauts-de-France (formerly FRAC Nord-Pas de Calais)

== See also ==
- List of German women artists
