= Brujas (skate crew) =

- Formation: 2014
- Headquarters: The Bronx, New York City, United States
- Region served: Worldwide
- Members: Yes, subscription-based
- Official language: English
- Website: brujas.nyc

Brujas (founded 2014) are a feminist skate collective and streetwear brand based in the Bronx, New York City.

== History ==
The Brujas name (English: witches) is derived and inspired by a 1986 video called Skate Witches. Brujas was founded by Arianna Gil, Sheyla Grullon, and other skaters in 2014 to host safe meeting places for female skaters of color. Since its inception, the Brujas collective participates in community organizing and political activism with an interest in challenging oppressive traditions. Brujas hosts community events, making space for marginalized individuals and communities to skateboard. As a women-run brand, the Brujas collective advocates for women and people of color, partially informed by their own experiences as women in skateboarding.

In regards to the name Brujas, Gil explained: "We are intersectional feminists who are interested in spirituality and the tradition of brujería (witchcraft) in our culture. So there was more going on than just that little YouTube video." In 2016 Brujas created Brujas x 1971, a limited edition streetwear line that was funded through Kickstarter. The 1971 in the name refers to Attica prisoner uprising, of 1971. The line raised money for prisoner rights. "We see 1971 as a combination of both the political DIY cultures that we were radicalized on the Lower East Side, anarchist organizing where people sell T-shirts and throw parties to get their friends out of prison, and the really brash street and skate wear aesthetics that have been developing for ages," said Izzy Nastasia a Bruja member.

In 2016 the New Museum in New York hosted Scamming the Patriarchy: A Youth Summit that included Brujas as one of the organizers. About their work, Sara O'Keeffe, assistant curator of the New Museum mentioned, "Brujas is a critical voice among an emerging generation of artists, writers and activists who are propelling conversations about politics and forging spaces for empowerment."

In 2017, Brujas presented a pop-up classroom to present their streetwear line as part of New York Fashion Week. The grass-roots presentation received critical acclaim. In 2018, BRUJAS presented an exhibition titled "Training Facility" at Performance Space New York where they turned the art venue into a skatepark. Brujas organizes inclusive parties, including Anti-Prom and SUCIA. In 2019, Brujas hosted the fourth Anti-Prom party in celebration of Pride.
