= Performance studies =

Interdisciplinary academic field

Performance studies is an interdisciplinary academic field that teaches the development of performance skills and uses performance as a lens and a tool to study the world. The term performance is broad, and can include artistic and aesthetic performances like concerts, theatrical events, and performance art; sporting events; social, political and religious events like rituals, ceremonies, proclamations and public decisions; certain kinds of language use; and those components of identity which require someone to do, rather than just be, something. Performance studies draws from theories and methods of the performing arts, anthropology, sociology, literary theory, culture studies, critical theory, communication studies, and others.

Performance studies tends to concentrate on a mix of research methods. The application of practice-led or practice-based research methods has become a widespread phenomenon not just in the anglophone world. As such research projects integrate established methods like literature research and oral history with performance practice, i.e. artistic auto-ethnographic approaches and verbatim theatre. The documentation of Practice-as-Research in Performance (PARIP), a devoted research project conducted at the University of Bristol between 2001 and 2006, offers a number of inspiring articles and portraits of such research projects and was key for a breakthrough of using creative thinking within this subject field.

== Origins and basic concepts ==
Performance studies has been charged as an emerging discipline. As an academic field it is difficult to pin down; which could be the nature of the field itself or it is still too young to tell. In either case, many academics have been critical of its instability. There are, however, numerous degree-granting programs that train researchers being offered by universities. Some have referred to it as an "inter discipline" or a "post discipline."

Scholars in today's field of performance studies may trace their roots to a number of other fields such as elocution, interpretation, theatre, anthropology, and speech communication. According to Diana Taylor, "what they have in common is their shared object of study: performance—in the broadest possible sense—as a process, praxis, and episteme, a mode of transmission, an accomplishment, and a means of intervening in the world."

Richard Schechner states that performance studies examines performances in two categories, the first being artistic performance, marked and understood as art. This includes solo-performance, performance art, performance of literature, theatrical storytelling, plays, and performance poetry. Artistic performance considers performance as an art form. The second category is cultural performance, which includes events that occur in everyday life, in which a culture's values are displayed for their perpetuation: rituals such as parades, religious ceremonies, community festivals, controversial storytelling, and performances of social and professional roles, and individual performances of race, gender, sexuality and class are all considered a form of cultural performance.

=== Elocution ===
The oldest roots of performance studies are in elocution, sometimes referred to as declamation. This early approach to public speech delivery focused on verbal diction, physical gestures, stance, tone, and even dress. A revival of its practices during the eighteenth century, also known as The Elocution Movement, contributed to the emergence of Elocution as an academic discipline in its own right. One of the major figures of the Elocution Movement was actor and scholar Thomas Sheridan. Sheridan's lectures on elocution, collected in Lectures on Elocution (1762) and his Lectures on Reading (1775), provided directions for marking and reading aloud passages from literature. Another actor, John Walker, published his two-volume Elements of Elocution in 1781, which provided detailed instruction on voice control, gestures, pronunciation, and emphasis.

The elocution movement took hold in the West; schools and departments of elocution and oratory cropped up across England and the United States throughout much of the eighteenth and nineteenth centuries. Most significant of these to performance studies today is the Northwestern University School of Oratory, established in 1894 by Robert McLean Cumnock to teach speech education on the principles of elocution. The School of Oratory housed their Department of Interpretation which focused on literature and on the art of interpretation as a means of understanding literature and bringing it to life through oral reading. In 1984, the Department of Interpretation was named the Department of Performance Studies to incorporate a broader definition of texts.

=== Oral interpretation of literature ===
On the literature front, Wallace Bacon (1914–2001) was considered by many to be someone who pioneered performance theory. Bacon taught performance of literature as the ultimate act of humility. In his defining statement of performance theory, "Our center is in the interaction between readers and texts which enriches, extends, clarifies, and (yes) alters the interior and even the exterior lives of students [and performers and audiences] through the power of texts" (Literature in Performance, Vol 5 No 1, 1984; p. 84).

In addition, Robert Breen's text Chamber Theatre is a cornerstone in the field for staging narrative texts, though it remains controversial in its assertions about the place of narrative details in chamber productions. Breen is also regarded by many as a founding theorist for the discipline, along with advocate Louise Rosenblatt. More recently, performance theorist and novelist Barbara Browning has suggested that narrative fiction itself—and particularly the novel—demands the performative participation of the reader.

=== Theatre and anthropology ===
On the theatrical and anthropological front, this origin is often regarded as the research collaborations of director Richard Schechner and anthropologist Victor Turner. This origin narrative emphasizes a definition of performance as being "between theatre and anthropology" and often stresses the importance of intercultural performances as an alternative to either traditional proscenium theatre or traditional anthropological fieldwork.

Dwight Conquergood developed a branch of performance ethnography that centered the political nature of the practice and advocated for methodological dialogism from the point of encounter to the practices of research reporting.

Barbara Kirshenblatt-Gimblett has contributed an interest in tourist productions and ethnographic showmanship to the field, Judd Case has adapted performance to the study of media and religion, Diana Taylor has brought a hemispheric perspective on Latin American performance and theorized the relationship between the archive and the performance repertoire, while Corinne Kratz developed a mode of performance analysis that emphasizes the role of multimedia communication in performance. Laurie Frederik argues for the importance of ethnographic research and a solid theoretical base in anthropological perspective.

=== Speech-act theory and performativity ===
An alternative origin narrative stresses the development of speech-act theory by philosophers J. L. Austin and Judith Butler, literary critic Eve Kosofsky Sedgwick, and also Shoshana Felman. The theory proposed by Austin in How To Do Things With Words states that "to say something is to do something, or in saying something we do something, and even by saying something we do something". the most illustrative example being "I do", as part of a marriage ceremony. For any of these performative utterances to be felicitous, per Austin, they must be true, appropriate and conventional according to those with the proper authority: a priest, a judge, or the scholar, for instance. Austin accounts for the infelicitous by noting that "there will always occur difficult or marginal cases where nothing in the previous history of a conventional procedure will decide conclusively whether such a procedure is or is not correctly applied to such a case". The possibility of failure in performatives (utterances made with language and the body) is taken up by Butler and is understood as the "political promise of the performative". Her argument is that because the performative needs to maintain conventional power, convention itself has to be reiterated, and in this reiteration it can be expropriated by the unauthorized usage and thus create new futures. She cites Rosa Parks as an example:

When Rosa Parks sat in the front of the bus, she had no prior right to do so guaranteed by any…conventions of the South. And yet, in laying claim to the right for which she had no prior authorization, she endowed a certain authority on the act, and began the insurrectionary process of overthrowing those established codes of legitimacy.

The question of the infelicitous utterance (the misfire) is also taken up by Shoshana Felman when she states "Infelicity, or failure, is not for Austin an accident of the performative, it is inherent in it, essential to it. In other words ... Austin conceives of failure not as external but as internal to the promise, as what actually constitutes it."

=== Other fields ===
Performance studies has also had a strong relationship to the fields of feminism, psychoanalysis, critical race theory and queer theory. Theorists like Peggy Phelan, José Esteban Muñoz, E. Patrick Johnson, Rebecca Schneider, and André Lepecki have been equally influential in both performance studies and these related fields.

== Academic programs ==
Performance studies incorporates theories of drama, dance, art, anthropology, folkloristics, philosophy, cultural studies, psychology, sociology, comparative literature, communication studies, and increasingly, music performance.

The first academic department with the name "Performance Studies" started at NYU in 1980. Shortly after in 1984 Northwestern University renamed its long-standing Department of Interpretation as the "Department of Performance Studies;" finally reflect their broadened definition of text and performance. Generally the differences between the NYU and Northwestern models cite different disciplinary concerns, however, in both instances a focus on practice lead to research methodologies and theories beyond theatre or literature in relation to or in service of understanding performance. For more information on the different origins and disciplinary traditions of performance studies see Shannon Jackson's book Professing Performance and the introductory chapter in Nathan Stucky and Cynthia Wimmer's Teaching Performance Studies.

Undergraduate and graduate programs are offered at the UCLA, UC Davis, UC Irvine, Kennesaw State University, Louisiana State University, California State University, Northridge, San Jose State University, Southern Illinois University Carbondale, Texas A&M University, University of Maryland, College Park, University of North Carolina at Chapel Hill, University of San Diego, University of Texas at Austin, and Washington University in St. Louis.

In the United Kingdom Aberystwyth University offers a degree scheme in performance studies with highly acclaimed performance artists such as Mike Pearson, Heike Roms and Jill Greenhalgh. The University of Roehampton in London offers a BA in drama, Theatre and Performance Studies. Richmond University, London also offers a BA in Performance and Theatre Arts. The University of Plymouth has offered a BA in Theatre & Performance since the early 1990s; its postgraduate research programme (ResM and MPhil/PhD) specialises in performance studies. The University of Warwick also offers a BA in Theatre and Performance Studies, in addition to leading Postgraduate programmes. More recently, the Guildford School of Acting has offered a BA in Theatre and Performance. Part of the conservatoire, the course focused on investigating performance practically, with strong emphasis on the idea of Practice as Research. The programme was led by Dr Laura Cull, founder of the now multinational Centre for Performance Philosophy; a new strand of performance studies which attempts to develop the relationship between philosophy and performance.

In Denmark Roskilde University offers a master and ph.d. degree in "performance design", focusing on subjects such as theatrical performances, live music, festivals, and urban performances.

In Poland, Jagiellonian University in Kraków offers a master program in performance studies at the Faculty of Polish Language and Literature.

In India, Jawaharlal Nehru University offers MPhil and PhD program in theatre & performance studies at the School of Arts & Aesthetics. Since 2012, School of Culture and Creative Expressions, Ambedkar University Delhi, started a MA program in performance studies, which focus on redefining methodologies of cultural studies and research on the basis of the nuances of performance studies. It is formulating the first Practice based PhD in the country and working extensively in the realm of Practice-as-Research. On the similar lines, the Centre for Performance Research and Cultural Studies in South Asia (CPRACSIS), Kerala have organized series of workshops and seminars over the last few years to engage scholars, artists and practitioners in conversation informed by performance studies.

In Australia, the University of Sydney, Victoria University and Queensland University of Technology offer degrees majoring in performance studies, honours, masters and PhD. Performance studies in some countries is also an A-level (AS and A2) course consisting of the integration of the discrete art forms of Dance, Music and Drama in performing arts.

In Brazil, the Universidade Federal de Goiás, started an interdisciplinary program (masters) in cultural performances in 2012, the first in a Latin country. The goal of this program is to analyse "rituals, games, performances, drama, dance" from a cross-cultural point of view.

== See also ==
- David Lewin
- Brooks McNamara
- Tracie Morris
- Fred Moten
- Jon McKenzie
- Performative turn
- Theatre pedagogy
- Bryan Reynolds
- Harvey Young
- Tavia Nyong'o
- Robin Bernstein
