= André Lepecki =

Writer and curator (born 1965)

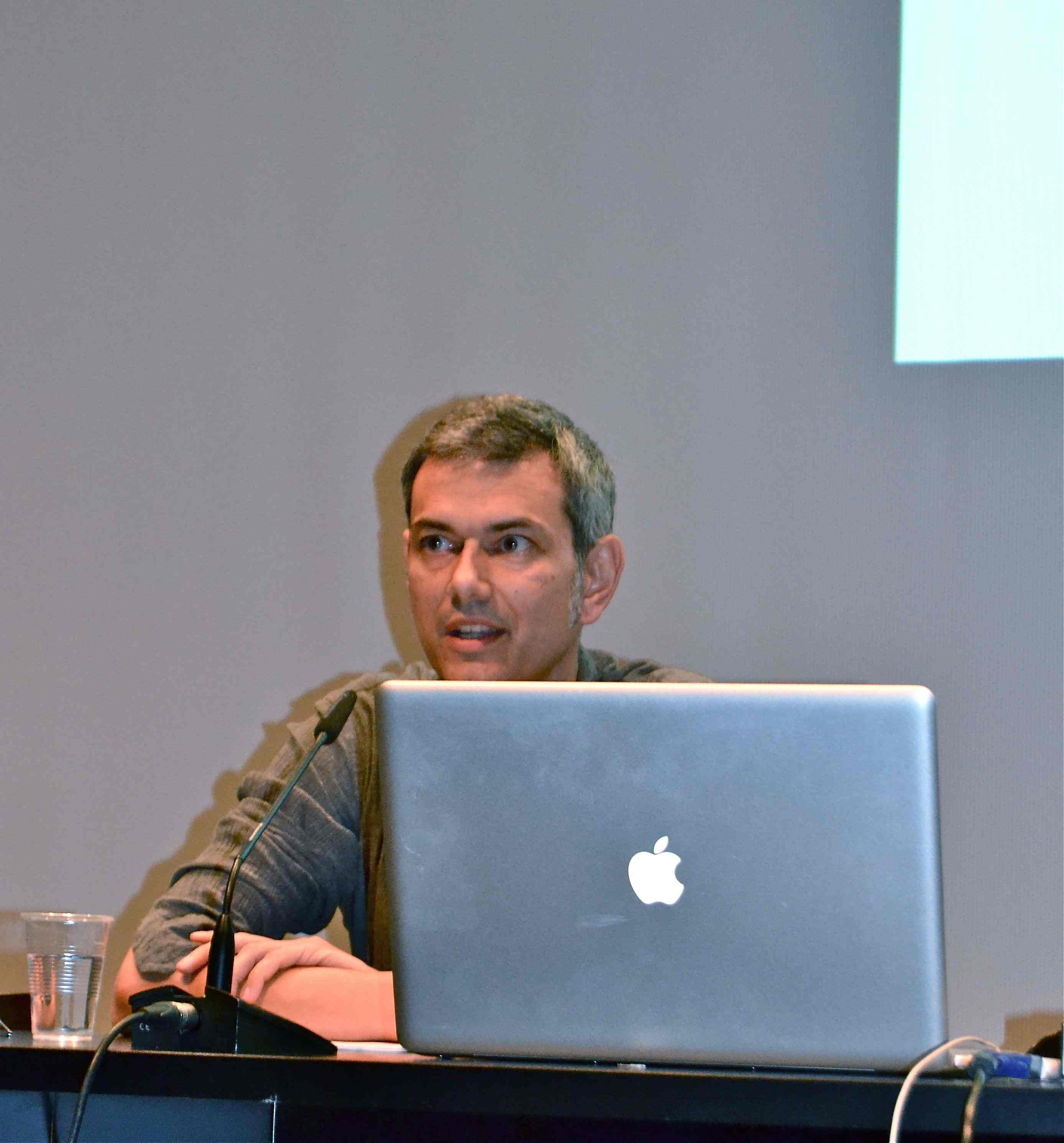
- Born: July 15, 1965 (age 59)
- Education: New York University; New University of Lisbon
- Notable work: Exhausting Dance (2006), Singularities: Dance in the Age of Performance (2016)

André Lepecki (born July 15, 1965) is a writer and curator working mainly on performance studies, choreography and dramaturgy. He is a Professor and the chair of the Department of Performance Studies at Tisch School of the Arts at New York University. He has published widely and edited several anthologies. He has also curated numerous festivals and exhibitions including the award-winning re-staging of Allan Kaprow’s 18 Happenings in 6 Parts. In 2010 he co-curated the Archive on Dance and Visual Arts since the 1960s for the exhibition Move: Choreographing You at the Hayward Gallery, London. He is the author of the books Exhausting Dance (2006) and Singularities: Dance in the Age of Performance (2016) and the editor of Dance (2013), Planes of Composition (with Jenn Joy, 2009), The Senses in Performance (with Sally Banes, 2007), and Of the Presence of the Body (2004).
