= Distinktion =

- Discipline: Social theory, political theory
- Language: English
- Edited by: Hannah Richter, Gavin Rae

Publication details
- History: 2000-present
- Publisher: Routledge
- Frequency: Triannually
- Open access: Hybrid
- Impact factor: 0.7 (2022)

Standard abbreviations
- ISO 4: Distinktion

Indexing
- ISSN: 1600-910X (print); 2159-9149 (web)
- LCCN: 2009215007
- OCLC no.: 746936465

Links
- Journal homepage; Online access; Online archive

Distinktion: Journal of Social Theory is a triannual peer-reviewed academic journal covering social and political theory. It is published by Routledge and the editors-in-chief are Hannah Richter (University of Sussex) and Gavin Rae (Universidad Complutense de Madrid). The journal was established in 2000.

== Abstracting and indexing ==
The journal is abstracted and indexed in:

- Emerging Sources Citation Index
- EBSCO databases
- ProQuest databases
- Scopus

According to the Journal Citation Reports, the journal has a 2022 impact factor of 0.7.
