= Performance Space New York =

Nonprofit arts organization

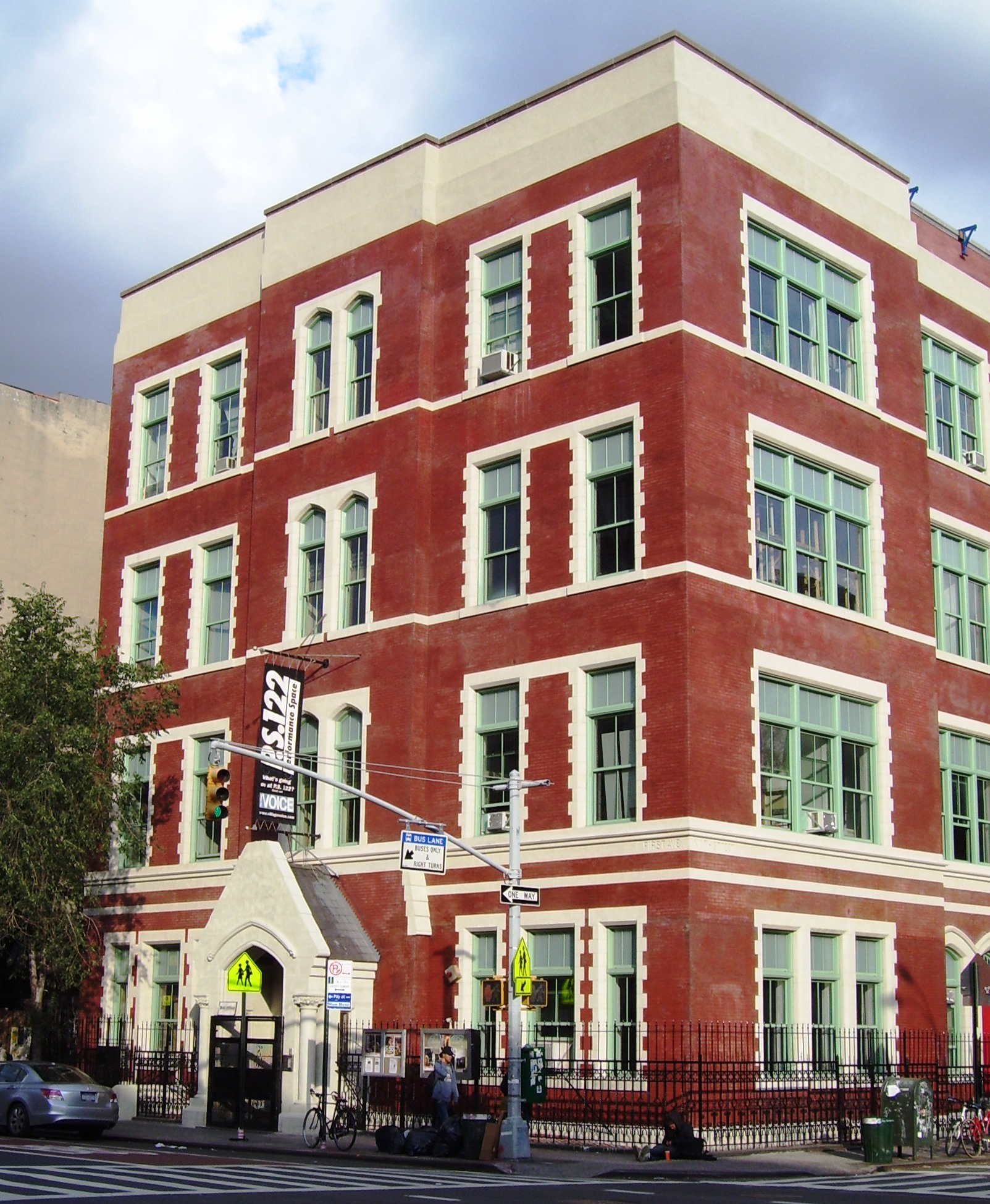
- Performance Space New York (formerly Performance Space 122 or P.S. 122) is housed in an old public elementary school in the East Village neighborhood of Manhattan.
- Interactive map of Performance Space New York
- Address: 150 First Avenue
- Location: New York City, New York, U.S.
- Coordinates: 40°43′42″N 73°59′04″W

Construction
- Opened: 1980 (as presentation venue)

Website
- performancespacenewyork.org

Performance Space New York, formerly known as Performance Space 122 or P.S. 122, is a nonprofit arts organization founded in 1980 in the East Village of Manhattan in an abandoned public school building.

== Origin ==
The former elementary school, Public School 122, was abandoned and in disrepair, until a group of visual artists began to use the old classrooms for studios. In 1979, choreographer Charles Moulton began holding rehearsals and workshops in the second-floor cafeteria and invited fellow performers Charles Dennis, John Bernd, and Peter Rose to collaborate in the administration and use of the space. Tim Miller, John Bernd's lover, later joined the four in launching P.S. 122.

One of the space's earliest offerings created by one of the founders, choreographer Stephanie Skura, was Open Movement, a weekly, non-performative, improvisational dance event. Early participants in Open Movement included artists Ishmael Houston-Jones, Yvonne Meier, Jennifer Monson, Yoshiko Chuma, Jennifer Miller, Jeremy Nelson, and Christopher Knowles, among other dance and performance artists. P.S. 122 began presenting shows in 1980 with the first "Avant-Garde-Arama", a multidisciplinary showcase, and published its first complete calendar of performances, classes, and workshops. The first full-length public play or performance presented in P.S. 122 in October 1980 was a play by Robin Epstein and Dorothy Cantwell's experimental women's theater company, More Fire! Productions.

== Expansion ==
Mark Russell was hired as the artistic director in 1983 to curate and focus the overall programming, expanding it from a rental house into a year-round presenting facility. P.S. 122 doubled its programming in 1986 when it converted the old gym on the first floor into a performance space to be used for extended runs of small theater groups and as a site for community meetings. Russell departed in 2004. Vallejo Gantner succeeded him in the position with the 2005–2006 season through 2017 and notably created Performance Space 122's annual winter series, the COIL Festival.

== Funding ==
In 2005, P.S. 122 was among 406 New York City arts and social service institutions to receive part of a $20 million grant from the Carnegie Corporation, made possible through a donation by New York City Mayor Michael Bloomberg.

In 2011, funding from the New York City Department of Cultural Affairs initiated an extensive $37 million renovation of the First Avenue building that houses P.S. 122 and four other organizations. During the six-year process, P. S. 122 held programming at partner venues across New York City, including Danspace Project, The Chocolate Factory, Abrons Arts Center, The Invisible Dog Art Center, and La MaMa ETC, operating from administrative office spaces based in Brooklyn. P.S. 122's revamped spaces reopened in January 2018 with the premiere of "Visions of Beauty" by choreographer Heather Kravas, held as part of the 2018 COIL Festival.

== Rebranding ==
In 2017, former MoMA PS1 curator Jenny Schlenzka was named Gantner's successor as executive artistic director, becoming the first female director in the organization's history. Coinciding with the reopening of its building, the organization announced its new name, Performance Space New York. The updated name is meant to signal "an ambition to be relevant and accessible to all of New York", in Schlenzka's words, and to actively collaborate with the local community in its programs. Schlenzka's first full season of programming began in February–June 2018 with a series of performances, discussions, film screenings, and other presentations specifically themed around the East Village. The series included up-and-coming performers and collectives representative of the area today while paying homage to Performance Space New York's past. Performance Space New York's new logo and identity were created by German visual artist Sarah Ortmeyer.

== Facilities ==
Since its renovation in 2011, Performance Space New York now has two interdisciplinary theater spaces that showcase dance performances, performance art, art exhibitions, music performances, and film screenings.

== Artist awards ==
Performance Space New York supports two ongoing artist awards, The Spalding Gray Award and The Ethyl Eichelberger Award.

The Spalding Gray Award, named after the groundbreaking monologist Spalding Gray (1941–2004), is sponsored by a consortium that includes Kathleen Russo, Gray's widow; Performance Space New York; the Walker Art Center in Minneapolis; The Andy Warhol Museum in Pittsburgh; and On the Boards in Seattle. The award comes with a $20,000 commission to create new work and provides for a full production of that work presented by each organization. Past recipients include Tim Etchells, Richard Maxwell, Rabih Mroué, Young Jean Lee, National Theater of the United States of America, Radiohole, and Heather Woodbury.

The Ethyl Eichelberger Award, named for the flamboyant, trailblazing performer Ethyl Eichelberger (1945–1990), is awarded to an artist who "exemplifies Ethyl's larger-than-life style and generosity of spirit; who embodies Ethyl's multi-talented artistic virtuosity, bridging worlds and inspiring those around them." Recipients include Dane Terry, Mike Iveson, Taylor Mac, Julie Atlas Muz, Justin Vivian Bond, Jennifer Miller, Vaginal Davis, John Kelly, and Peggy Shaw.
