= RAVON =

Robust Autonomous Vehicle for Off-road Navigation
- Type: Autonomous vehicle
- Purpose: Off-road navigation

RAVON (Robust Autonomous Vehicle for Off-road Navigation) is a robot being developed at the Robotics Research Lab at University of Kaiserslautern, Germany. The vehicle is used, as a testbed to investigate behaviour-based strategies on motion adaptation, localization and navigation in rough outdoor terrain. The basis vehicle was produced by Robosoft.

== Description ==
The vehicle uses a 3D laser scanner.

The vehicle is an example of using behavior-based components on two layers of a multi-layer control system. It also uses a form of short-term memory to prevent collisions with obstacles that it observed some time ago.

The vehicle was experimentally tested at the 2nd Military European Land Robot Trial 2008.

== Technical specifications ==
- Length: 2.35 m
- Width: 1.4 m
- Height: 1.2 m
- Weight: 750 kg
- Computer: 4 On-board PCs
- Power Supply: 8 spiral cell batteries (12 V, 55 Ah each)
- Operation Time: about 4 hours
- Drive: 4WD with four independent electric motors
- Steering: front and rear wheel steering via linear motors
- Velocity: 10 km/h max.
- Controller: 2 Motorola 56F803 DSPs
- Computer: 4 On-board PCs
- Floor Clearance: 0.3 m
- Max. Slope: 100% (at 7 km/h)
