= Romanticism and Victorianism on the Net =

Open access journal

Romanticism on the Net (RoN) is an international, open access journal devoted to British Romantic literature. The journal was founded by Michael E. Sinatra in February 1996. It expanded its scope in August 2007 to include Victorian literature (under the editorship of Dino Franco Felluga and then Jason Camlot) and the new name Romanticism and Victorianism on the Net. In 2017, as the journal entered its third decade of publication, it reverted its scope back to Romantic literature, and expanded its core editorial team to include Chris Bundock, Julia S. Carlson, Nicholas Mason, and Matthew Sangster.

== History ==
The journal was founded in February 1996 as Romanticism on the Net under the editorship of Michael Sinatra. In August 2007, it expanded to include Victorian literature and changed its name to Romanticism and Victorianism on the Net.
