= Social studies of finance =

Interdisciplinary research area

Social studies of finance is an interdisciplinary research area that combines perspectives from anthropology, economic sociology, science and technology studies, international political economy, behavioral finance, and cultural studies in the study of financial markets and financial instruments. Work in social studies of finance emphasizes the social and cultural dimensions of financial activities, but focuses also on technical and economic dimensions such as pricing and trading.

== History ==
Financial markets have been an object for sociological inquiry since, at least, Max Weber’s Die Börse. The rise of quantitative financial theory in financial economics from the 1950s onwards has led to an academic specialization on financial markets rather focused on economic modeling, and poorly attentive to sociological aspects. In the 1980s, a number of economic sociologists developed empirical investigation on the social structure and cultural characteristics of financial markets, especially in the US. Such pioneering researchers included contributions from Wayne E. Baker, Mitchel Y. Abolafia and Charles W. Smith, and was based on methods such as ethnographic observation or social network analysis. In the 1990s, a number of researchers from the field of science and technology studies such as Karin Knorr-Cetina and Donald A. MacKenzie started also developing empirical research in this area, with close attention to the role of expert knowledge and technology in financial activities.

== Main topics ==
Research topics in social studies of finance include the cultural world and work habits of professionals in financial markets, the globalization and regulation of financial services, the processes of innovation in the financial industry and the problems of risk and uncertainty that characterize such processes.

== Major references ==
- Adler, Patricia A. and Adler, Peter (eds) (1984) The Social Dynamics of Financial Markets, Greenwich (Connecticut): The JAI Press. ISBN 0-89232-435-X
- Bernstein, Peter (1993) Capital Ideas: The Improbable Origins of Modern Wall Street, New York: The Free Press. ISBN 0-02-903012-9
- Abolafia, Mitchel Y. (1997) Making Markets: Opportunism and Restraint on Wall Street, Cambridge (Massachusetts): Harvard University Press. ISBN 0-674-54324-6
- Hertz, Ellen (1998) The Trading Crowd: An Ethnography of the Shanghai Stock Market, Cambridge: Cambridge University Press. ISBN 0-521-56497-2
- Smith, Charles W. (1999) Success and Survival on Wall Street: Understanding the Mind of the Market, Lanham (Maryland): Rowman & Littlefield. ISBN 0-8476-9490-9
- Godechot, Olivier (2001) Les Traders: Essai de Sociologie des Marchés Financiers, Paris: La Découverte. ISBN 2-7071-3385-X
- Godechot, Olivier (2017) Wages, Bonuses and Appropriation of Profit in the Financial Industry, London: Routledge. ISBN 978-1-138-12396-0
- Knorr Cetina, Karin and Preda, Alex (eds) (2004) The Sociology of Financial Markets, Oxford: Oxford University Press. ISBN 0-19-927559-9
- MacKenzie, Donald (2006) An Engine, not a Camera: How Financial Models Shape Markets, Cambridge (Massachusetts): The MIT Press. ISBN 0-262-13460-8
