= Peggy Phelan =

American feminist scholar

- Born: Margaret Phelan; New York
- Awards: 2004 Guggenheim Fellowship for Theatre Arts

Philosophical work
- Main interests: Feminist performance studies

Peggy Phelan (born April 23, 1959) is an American feminist scholar. She is the Ann O’Day Maples Professor of the Arts, Professor of Theater & Performance Studies, and Professor of English at Stanford University.

== Career ==
Phelan is a former president and treasurer of Performance Studies International; the former chair of New York University's Department of Performance Studies from 1993 to 1996 and of Stanford University's Drama Department; and the former Denning Family Director of the Stanford Arts Institute. She is currently the Ann O’Day Maples Professor of the Arts, Professor of Theater & Performance Studies, and Professor of English at Stanford University.

Phelan's research interests include American literature, British literature, and performance studies with a focus in poetry and drama. Her work is primarily concerned with the ephemerality of live performance. While most of her initial work was rooted in feminist post-structuralism and psychoanalysis, her more recent work is concerned with media, photography, and visual arts. She has written on topics including the selfie, Ronald Reagan, and Andy Warhol. Her essay, "The Ontology of Performance," was originally published in her book Unmarked: The Politics of Performance (1993).

== Selected publications ==
- Phelan, Peggy. Live Art in La: Performance in Southern California, 1970-1983. New York: Routledge, 2012.
- Reckitt, Helena, and Peggy Phelan. Art and Feminism. London: Phaidon, 2001.
- Phelan, Peggy, Hans U. Obrist, Elisabeth Bronfen, and Pipilotti Rist. Pipilotti Rist. London: Phaidon, 2001.
- Phelan, Peggy, and Martin Gustavsson. Martin Gustavsson. 2001.
- Phelan, Peggy. Special Issue: Narrative and Performance. Ohio State University Press, 2000.
- Phelan, Peggy, and Jill Lane. The Ends of Performance. New York University Press, 1998.
- Phelan, Peggy. Mourning Sex: Performing Public Memories. London: Routledge, 1997.
- Phelan, Peggy. Unmarked: The Politics of Performance. London: Routledge, 1993.

== Awards ==
- Guggenheim Fellowship for Theatre Arts, 2004
- Getty Research Institute Scholar, 2004-2005
- Stanford Humanities Center Violet Andrews Whittier Fellow, 2011-2012
- Australian National University Humanities Institute Fellow
- Callaway Prize for dramatic criticism honorable mention, 1997-1999
