= National Theater of the United States of America =

Theatre company in New York City

National Theater of the United States of America was an experimental theater company in New York City active from 2000 to 2017. The theater has no connection with the American government; the name was intended to be humorous.

The troupe was founded in 2007 by Jesse Hawley, James Stanley, Ryan Bronz, Yehuda Duenyas, Mark Doskow, and Jonathan Jacobs. They were lauded by Gothamist as a "mischievous gang of innovators (that) represents some of the best attributes of downtown "experimental" theater". The New York Times praised the troupe of having "stealthily become one of the most exciting and eccentric young theater companies in town".
