= Devised theatre =

Method of theatre-making originating from collaboration

Devised theatre – frequently called collective creation – is a method of theatre-making in which the script or (if it is a predominantly physical work) performance score originates from collaborative, often improvisatory work by a performing ensemble. The ensemble is typically made up of actors, but other categories of theatre practitioners may also be central to this process of generative collaboration, such as visual artists, composers, and choreographers; indeed, in many instances, the contributions of collaborating artists may transcend professional specialization. This process is similar to that of commedia dell'arte and street theatre. It also shares some common principles with improvisational theatre; however, in devising, improvisation is typically confined to the creation process: by the time a devised piece is presented to the public, it usually has a fixed, or partly fixed form. Historically, devised theatre is also strongly aligned with physical theatre, due at least in part to the fact that training in such physical performance forms as commedia, mime, and clown tends to produce an actor-creator with much to contribute to the creation of original work.

== Devising methods ==
Devising methods vary: collaborating groups tend to develop distinct methodologies based upon the backgrounds and talents of their members. Work creation may, for instance, begin with an image, a plot, a theme, a character, historical documents, an entire novel or a single line as a point of departure; a devised work may be text based or entirely physical; it maybe politically engaged, purely aesthetic, a docudrama, a melodrama, a performative ritual, a fairytale; it may follow a linear narrative structure, or emerge from the aesthetics of montage or collage; it may be, indeed, entirely devoid of live performers (see Designers' Theatre). In short, devised theatre exists on a stylistic spectrum as broad as that of theatre generally, and devising methods must vary not only in relation to the group, but in relation to the nature (style, form, content, purpose) of the project.

For this reason, devising methods are often associated with the companies in which they evolved, and devising training for theatre makers is often associated with particular directors and companies: for instance, Viewpoints and the Suzuki method (the core methods of the SITI Company); techniques developed by Jerzy Grotowski; the physical and vocal training of the Gardzienice Center for Theatre Practices in Poland; Lecoq technique. A growing body of writing on devising process has emerged from the practical research of collectives (see for example, The Frantic Assembly Book of Devising Theatre, Anne Bogart's The Viewpoints Book, and Jacques Lecoq's The Moving Body: Teaching Creative Theatre), and a number of theatre programs in the US and England have added devising courses, and in some cases, devising programs to their theatre curricula, leading to a widening circulation of devising techniques, and arguably a growing number (and prominence) of devising companies.

Nonetheless, some frequently employed approaches and principles can be identified, especially: use of improvisation; reliance on physically expressive performance styles; a lengthy development process; a period of accrual and excess as a basis for a subsequent period of selection, editing and refining. The creative process may or may not involve a director (often functioning as a facilitator of group creativity at the outset, and an "outside eye" and editor later into the process), as well as a writer or writers working either alongside the creative ensemble in the rehearsal room, or collecting the material generated and turning it into a script subsequently.

== History ==
The history of collaboratively devised performance is as old as the theatre: we see prototypes of contemporary devising practice in ancient and modern mime, in circus arts and clowning, in commedia dell'arte; some cultural traditions, indeed, have always created performance through predominantly collectivist methods (theatre scholar and performance maker Nia Witherspoon, for instance, has argued that the very term "collective creation," with its implicit dichotomy of self vs. other, is inherently eurocentric).

Theatre historians Kathryn Syssoyeva and Scott Proudfit have argued that the modern, European tradition of collective creation follows rapidly upon the emergence of directing as a profession, and unfolds in three overlapping waves (marked by distinctive processual, aesthetic, and political characteristics): 1900-1945, 1945-1985, and 1985 to the present. Elements of collective devising appear in the work of European directors at least as early as 1905, beginning with early experiments facilitated by such directors and groups as Vsevolod Meyerhold and Evgeny Vakhtangov (Russia), Jacques Copeau and the Copiaus, Michel Saint-Denis and the Compagnie des Quinze (France), Reduta (Poland), and Erwin Piscator (Germany). The 1930s saw a proliferation of collective creation methods, influenced in part by the rise of the labor movement, and with it, workers' theatre in the US and Europe; World War II and the politics of the Cold War in capitalist states brought a temporary halt to that flowering.

Nonetheless, by the post-war period, a number of theatre practitioners and ensembles, including Bertolt Brecht and the Berliner Ensemble, Judith Malina and The Living Theatre, Joan Littlewood and Theatre Workshop, Jerzy Grotowski and the Theatre of 13 Rows, and Peter Brook, had begun actively experimenting with collaborative methods that engaged and/or trained performers as actor-creators. The period from '68 and on into the 1970s witnessed an explosion of collective creation practices in the Americas and Europe (East and West); as in the 1930s, this wave of interest in collectivism and collaboration in art was deeply influenced by contemporaneous political developments, such as the rise of the New Left. Among the many companies and theatre artists who contributed to the development of collective devising in the second half of the twentieth century, major European and North American figures include Ariane Mnouchkine and Theatre du Soleil, and Jacques Lecoq in France; Robert Lepage in Quebec; R.G. Davis and the San Francisco Mime Troupe, Joseph Chaikin and the Open Theater, Luiz Valdez and the Teatro Campesino, Ruth Maleczech, Joanne Akalaitis, Lee Breuer and the Mabou Mines; Richard Schechner and the Performance Group; and Elizabeth LeCompte and the Wooster Group in the US; the Gardzienice Center for Theatre Practices in Poland; the Work Center of Jerzy Grotowski and Thomas Richards in Italy; the Odin Teatret in Denmark.

The rise of collective creation in theatrical performance between 1900 and the 70s at times paralleled, at times intersected with related developments in modern dance, French mime (beginning with the pioneering work of Suzanne Bing and the Copiaus), performance art and documentary theatre.

Beginning from the mid-1980s, with the emergence of a new generation of ensembles and collectives, and increased dissemination of devising models and training methods through theatre festivals, training workshops, and college courses, a shift occurred, away from the more political drivers fueling much collective creation during the civil rights era, and toward more decidedly aesthetic and economic drivers; this is the period in which such practices come to be more expressly associated with the term "Devising."

Prominent companies currently devising in the US, Canada and England include: Mabou Mines, the Wooster Group, Pig Iron Theatre Company, The TEAM, Elevator Repair Service, Ghost Road, Double Edge Theatre, The Rude Mechs, The Neo-Futurists, Nature Theater of Oklahoma, Tectonic Theatre Project, Complicité, Told by an Idiot, Improbable, Frantic Assembly, Shunt, InHEIRitance Project, Ghost River Theatre, Radix Theatre, bluemouth inc., and One Yellow Rabbit Theatre.
