= Remi Barclay Messenger =

American actress

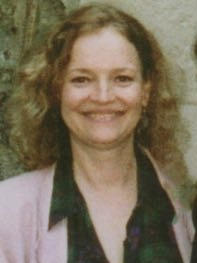
- Born: Anne Barclay; 1946 (age 79–80); Springfield, Missouri
- Other names: Remi Barclay Bosseau
- Education: Tulane University (BA)
- Occupations: Actress, theatre director, celebrant
- Spouses: Jason Bosseau (m. 1971; div. 1996); Dally Messenger III (m. 2005)
- Children: Dylan Cheyenne Bosseau (b.1975)

Remi Barclay Messenger (also Remi Barclay and Remi Barclay Bosseau born 1946) was a founding member of three prominent professional theatre companies in the New York City area – the Performance Group (1967–1970), Dionysus in 69 with Richard Schechner, Whole Theatre (1971–1990) and Voices of Earth (1988–2000), the latter two with Olympia Dukakis as a co-director. Her theatre work included years of acting, directing and teaching as well as creating workshops for a wide spectrum of institutions, schools and universities. In 2002, she graduated as a civil celebrant and celebrant trainer in New Jersey, and from 2004 in Australia. She retired in 2016.

== Early life ==
Remi Barclay was born in Springfield, Missouri, but spent her early formative years in Houston, Texas. From 1963 to 1967, she attended Tulane University in New Orleans, with her junior year abroad in Paris at Sorbonne University. In 1967, she completed her Bachelor of Arts in theatre and philosophy.

== Career ==
In late 1967, Barclay moved to New York and joined the Performance Group as a foundation member, an ensemble of performers under the Director Richard Schechner. Schechner, inter alia, adapted Greek classic myths for contemporary audiences including Dionysus in '69. This production was particularly controversial and was much commented on by critics.

In 1971, the actors Louis Zorich and his wife, Olympia Dukakis, founded a theatre ensemble which included Barclay, Jason Bosseau, Gerald Fierst and 12 other actors and designers. Naming themselves Whole Theatre, they based themselves in Montclair, New Jersey. In the two decades of this theatre, they presented plays, and were supported by the local community and the theatre community of New York and New Jersey. In 1975 and 1976, the company received over 120 donors as well as funding from the New Jersey State Council on the Arts and the Rockefeller Brothers Fund.

In 1989, Remi Barclay was listed as one of the three directors of the company alongside Olymypia Dukakis as artistic director and Gerald Fierst as co-director with Barclay of education and outreach.

She wrote and performed The Courage to Fly Through The Wind Of Your Dreams for Columbia University in 1987. She is a registered drama therapist. She has taught at Rutgers University and is on the faculty of schools and institutions around New Jersey. She also worked with Living Stage Theatre Company in Washington DC. She is director of the Whole Theater's social action company Thunder In The Light.

Whole Theatre, under Remi Barclay's and Gerald Fierst's direction, developed community theatre classes for all ages with the assistance of fellow actors, when the company was not in a season of performances.

Concurrently with Whole Theatre, in 1988 Barclay joined with Dukakis, Leslie Avaysian, and Joan MacIntosh to create a performance ensemble, Voices of Earth, improvising and exploring themes from the Mesopotamian myth of the goddess Inanna, Queen of Heaven, and her sister Ereshkigal, Queen of the Underworld, as they inform the lives of modern women and men. The group created workshops at the Omega Institute, the Public Theatre in New York, Smith College, Williams College in Massachusetts, and other places.

In 1995, the American Conservatory Theater at the Yerba Buena Center for the Arts in San Francisco, presented Euripides' Hecuba adapted by Timberlake Wertenbaker. Barclay performed in every show as part of the ensemble alongside Viola Davis. Barclay was also understudy to Olympia Dukakis who played Hecuba. As understudy, Barclay performed eight public performances in the lead role.

== Civil celebrant ==
=== United States ===
In the months following the September 11 attacks on New York City by Al-Qaeda, Barclay assisted in the organization of several memorial services for victims who had lived in Montclair, New Jersey. Philanthropist Gaile Sarma invited her to join a group training to be civil celebrants — following the Australian model founded by the Australian Attorney-General Lionel Murphy. Barclay accepted the invitation and thus became an American celebrant. Gaile Sarma had secured the services of the Australian civil celebrant and celebrant trainer Dally Messenger III who visited the United States several times to progress the pioneer training program.

=== Australia ===
In late 2003, Barclay migrated to Australia. Barclay was a teacher and trainer with the International College of Celebrancy.

From 2010 to 2016, she practiced as an occasional lecturer and workshop leader on mythology, history, theatre and celebrancy.
