= Jim Clayburgh =

American scenic designer

- Born: 23 May 1949 (age 77); New York City, New York
- Occupation: Scenic designer
- Years active: 1973–present
- Relatives: Jill Clayburgh (sister)

Jim Clayburgh (born May 23, 1949) is an American scenic designer. He was a founding member of The Wooster Group and served as the group's resident designer from 1975 to 1994. He currently lives in Brussels, Belgium, where he founded the company JOJI INC with choreographer and dancer Johanne Saunier, and continues to design for theatre, film, dance and opera both in the USA and in Europe.

== Life and career ==
Jim Clayburgh is the brother of actress Jill Clayburgh (1944–2010).

Clayburgh holds a Bachelor of Arts degree from Claremont McKenna College, majoring in design at Pomona College, and a Master of Fine Arts degree in Theatre Design from New York University School Of The Arts. In the USA he has taught masterclasses at MIT, New York Tisch School of the Arts, University of California Santa Cruz, University of Michigan, Hollins University, Simons Rock College of Art. In Europe, he has taught at St Luc's Ecole Supérieur des Arts and the International School of Brussels.

He was part of the design team for the interior renovations of two major concert halls in Brussels: La Maison de la Radio at Flagey, Ixelles, and Le Palais des Beaux Arts.

In 2011 he gave a keynote address at the 41st International Theatre Festival at the Venice Biennale.

In 2013–14 he was a Visiting Artist at the American Academy of Rome.

Clayburgh was a member of the jury and gave a design workshop at Prague Quadrennial of Performance Design and Space in 2019, and he was a key speaker at the 2015 edition.

In 2020, he collaborated with German soprano Sarah Maria Sun on texts for concerts and lyrics for songs.

== Approaches to scenic design ==
In conversation with Matthew Maguire:

"It interests me as a designer: looking for subconscious memories of space."

"The distraction of a twenty-minute light change in a concert setting seems to block the ability to listen for some. I find it a form of relaxation, a second track of active involved meditation. I'm surprised how few people shut their eyes when listening."

== Awards and articles ==
=== Awards ===
OBIE award for Sustained Achievement (The Wooster Group) (1991).

OBIE award for Sustained Achievement In Design (1982).

=== Articles ===
"A Space For Oedipus" – profile in Theatre Design & Technology, by Arnold Aronson (1978).

"Plywood and electronics" – profile in Theatre Crafts, by Tish Dace (1984).

== Design work ==
=== The Performance Group (1973–1978) ===
Production	Year	Director	Role
The Tooth of Crime	1973	Richard Schechner	Lighting design
The Tooth of Crime	1974	Richard Schechner	Set and lighting design
A Wing and a Prayer	1975	Ellen LeCompte	Lighting design
Thirty Years War	1975	Richard Schechner	Set and lighting design
Mother Courage and Her Children	1975	Richard Schechner	Set and lighting design
The Marilyn Project	1976	Richard Schechner	Set and lighting design
Oedipus	1977	Richard Schechner	Set and lighting design
Cops	1978	Richard Schechner	Set and lighting design

=== The Wooster Group (1975–1994) ===
Co- design with Elizabeth Lecompte

Production	Year(s)	Role
Sakonnet Point	1975	Set co-design, Lighting design
Nayatt School	1978	Lighting design
Rumstick Road	1979	Set co-design, lighting design
Point Judith	1980	Set co-design, lighting design
3 Places in Rhode Island	1981	Set co-design, lighting design
Hula: a record album interpretation	1981	Lighting design
Routes 1&9	1981–85	Set co-design, lighting design
North Atlantic	1984–1986	Set and lighting design
L.S.D. (...Just the High Points...)	1986–1990	Set and lighting design
Frank Dell's The Temptation of St Anthony	1988–1990	Set design
BRACE UP!	1990–1994	Set design
Fish Story	1992–1996	Set design
White Homeland Commando (film)	1993	Art direction
Emperor Jones	1993–1996	Set design
The Hairy Ape	1994	Set design

=== Scenic design (other) ===
Production	Year	Director	Producer
Marie and Bruce	1979	Wilford Leach	NY Shakespeare Festival
Mary Stewart	1981	Des McAnuff	The Public Theatre
My Sister In This House	1981	Iverna Lockpez	Second Stage
The Confessions of a Dopefiend	1982	Matthew Maguire	Creation Company
Necessary Ends	1983	Jim Milton	NY Shakespeare Festival
Something Different	1983	Michael Kahn	Second Stage
Miss Universal Happiness	1985	Richard Foreman	Ontological-Hysteric Theatre
North Atlantic (remix)	2001	Elizabeth LeCompte	The Wooster Group
BRACE UP! (2003)	2003	Elizabeth LeCompte	The Wooster Group
In The Wind Of Time	2005	Isabella Soupart	Kunstenfestival des arts
KOD	2007	Isabella Soupart	Kunstenfestival des arts

=== Scenic and lighting design (1987–present) ===
Production	Year	Director / Choreographer	Producer	Role	Notes
Visions of Don Juan	1987	Matthew Maguire	Pepsico Summerfare Festival	Set and lighting design	NYC
Nightcoil	1989	Matthew Maguire	Creation Company	Set and lighting design	NYC
Goose and Tom-Tom	1986–90	David Rabe	NY Shakespeare Festival		NYC
Seventy Scenes of Halloween	1992	Matthew Maguire	Creation Company	Set and lighting design	NYC
An Evening of Music and Video	1994	Kit Fitzgerald	On The Boards		Seattle
Adventures	1999	P. Droulers / J. Clayburgh	La Monnaie	Direction, set and lighting design	Brussels
Final Scene	2000	JOJI INC	JOJI INC	Direction, set and lighting design	Brussels
Landscape with four figures	2001	Johanne Saunier	JOJI INC		
It's Like	2002	Johanne Saunier	JOJI INC	Set and lighting design	
Cara Lucia	2003/2007	Sharon Fogarty	Mabou Mines	Set and lighting design	NYC
It's Like (installation)	2004	Johanne Saunier	JOJI INC	Set and lighting design	
Erase-E(x) parts 1–6	2004–2007	The Wooster Group, Anne Teresa de Keersmaeker, Isabella Soupart, Kurt D’Haeseleer, Georges Aperghis, Johanne Saunier	JOJI INC	Set and lighting design	Various
In The Wind Of Time	2005	Isabella Soupart	Kunstenfestival des arts	Set design	Brussels
Mozart Choreographies	2007	Salva Sanchez et al.	Mozarteum	Lighting Design	Saltzburg
Im-Agined	2007	Jim Clayburgh	JOJI INC/STRP Festival Eindhoven	Direction, set and lighting design	Eindhoven
Kiss of Death	2007	Isabella Soupart	Kunstenfestival des arts	Set Design	
Lolita, an imagined opera	2008	Jim Clayburgh	Joji Inc and GMEM (Marseille)	Direction, set and lighting design	Marseille, Peak Performances, NYC
Walking On Rocks	2008	Jim Clayburgh	JOJI INC/Scène Nationale de Cavaillon	Direction, set and lighting design	Cavaillon, France
Line Of Oblivion	2010	Jim Clayburgh	JOJI INC	Direction, set and lighting design	Brussels
Collision(s)	2010	Isabella Soupart	MadeInBruxelles	Set and lighting design	Brussels
Lear, A King	2010	François Sarhan	CNN de Havre Haute Normandie / SN Chalon-sur-Saône	Set and lighting design	Rouen / Chalon-sur-Saône
Musée en Chantier	2011	JOJI INC	Théâtre des Tanneurs	Set and lighting design	Brussels
Modern Dance	2012	JOJI INC	SN Chalon-sur-Saône	Set and lighting design	Chalon-sur-Saône, France
Man of La Mancha	2012	Sybille Wilson	Festival de Wallonie	Set and lighting design	Brussels
Le Maître des illusions	2012	Sybille Wilson	Théâtre du parc	Set and lighting design	Brussels
Words	2012	Isabella Soupart	H&B Films	Set and lighting design	(film)
SpiderNight	2014	EU Dance Project	Dans Centrum Jette	Lighting design	Brussels
I Love My Family I Don't Like	2014	Isabella Soupart	MadeInBruxelles	Lighting design	Brussels
Steve Reich Project	2014	Isabella Soupart	Beyond+Between asbl	Lighting design	Brussels
After Words	2015	Isabella Soupart	MadeInBruxelles	Lighting design	Brussels
La Digitale	2015–2017	Sybille Wilson	Musicatreize	Set and lighting design	Marseille, Paris, Bogotá
Tutti Colori	2016	Roxane Huilmand	Dans Centrum Jette	Lighting design	Brussels
Urban Bubbles	2016	JOJI INC	JOJI INC/Salzburg International Performing arts	Lighting design	Saltzburg
C'est ici que le jour se lève	2016	Isabella Soupart	Théâtre Publique	Lighting design	Brussels
How To Act	2017	Isabella Soupart	H&B Films	Lighting design	(film)
La Légende du Roi Dragon	2018	Johanne Saunier	Opéra de Lille / Opéra de Bordeaux	Set and lighting design	Lille, Bordeaux
Short Films	2018	Isabella Soupart	H&B Films	Lighting design	(film)
Faust 2.0	2019	Sharon Fogarty	Mabou Mines	Set and lighting design	NYC
Carlotta's Room	2019	Arturo Fuentes	Festival Verticé UNAM	Lighting design and staging advice	Mexico City
Steve Reich Project	2019	Isabella Soupart	Ars Musica (BE) • Les Brigittines (BE)	Lighting	Brussels, Edinburgh
Dans un train	2020	Eléonore Lemaire	JOJI INC/Corps à son	Lighting design	Toulouse, Voiron, France
La Legende du Roi Dragon	2019	Johanne Saunier	Opera de Lille, Opera de Bordeaux	Set and lighting design	Lille, Bordeaux, France
Silence :Electro Pop Ballet	2022	Isabella Soupart	MadeInBruxelles	Lighting	Brussels
