= The Golden Boat =

- Film poster
- Directed by: Raúl Ruiz
- Written by: Raúl Ruiz
- Produced by: James Schamus, Jordi Torrent
- Starring: Michael Kirby; Federico Muchnik
- Cinematography: Maryse Alberti
- Edited by: Sylvia Waliga
- Music by: John Zorn
- Release date: 1990
- Running time: 85 Minutes
- Country: United States
- Language: English

The Golden Boat is a 1990 American low-budget film directed by Chilean filmmaker Raúl Ruiz. Shot in New York City, The Golden Boat is Ruiz's first film produced in the United States and has been categorized as an absurdist black comedy.

The setting of New York City is not only important to the plot of the film but also its production, for the film was “made in cooperation with the New York performance art group, The Kitchen.” Ruiz channels the performances of the individuals in the art group in order to complete a “transposition of both US and Mexican soap operas” on screen. The film's low budget was put together through a collaboration of small production companies; Duende Pictures, Nomad Films (Luxembourg), A.A.L.B. Partners, with the film's ludic nature being born out of, or produced through, the “collaboration with the postmodern performance group ‘The Kitchen.’”

One thing that is abundantly clear about the film is its lack of obviousness or clarity, which makes it all the more interesting that this film marked one of the first times that Ruiz shot from a script. But even with a script Ruiz’s The Golden Boat is elusive and ever-changing narrative, a film in flux. "In the United States you have to play by the rules," claimed Ruiz, who was living in the United States for the first time while he teaches film at Harvard. But a man making a feature for $125,000, from a script he wrote in two days and rewrites at whim, with a cast of mostly nonprofessional actors, who did not even know where his post-production money would come from, is not playing by U.S. rules. Yet in his standards this film's production was much more structured than his past works, for Ruiz stated that his American film was very organized. He compares it to his works in France, saying “I have shot scenes where I didn't know which actors were coming. I usually write the scene about one hour before the take."

The film seems to break all standard conventions in a way that only Ruiz knows how to do so masterfully well. As a spectator one is left wondering what the film is about, as it's “a sort of Beckettian black comedy of anti-manners, involving New Yorkers who insult and knife each other and themselves and then return from the dead - ask the question, provoke guffaws, and never get an answer. More often people defined the story by what it was not: as the Wooster Group's Kate Valk, the Mexican soap-opera star, lectured me, “There’s no psychologically linear narrative. It’s more formal, more surreal. I am the sound of my voice, which is the same as the color of the room.”

Members of the production crew were given little direction in a way that provides legitimacy to the power of not knowing. Continuity is nearly entirely absent, for Michael Kirby, the NYU professor of performance studies who was playing Austin, a knife-wielding philosopher, said The Golden Boat had "the strange continuity of a dream. The smallest thing that comes into a dream will suddenly make it take off in that direction." When asked about this, Ruiz began making air-drawn maps that turned and wandered and branched out like some unstoppable family tree. "You can follow this direction or you can follow that direction and then suddenly there's another one which moves parallel to that one," he said.

The film deconstructs traditional narrative techniques, multiplying the linguistic eccentricities. The Golden Boat was realized on a small budget, relying on the avant-garde theater company The Kitchen. Several important artists on the New York scene took part in the film such as Jim Jarmusch, Kathy Acker, Vito Acconci, John Zorn, the Wooster Group, or Annie Sprinkle.

== Plot ==
The Golden Boat is inspired by American police series, mixed with Mexican soap operas, and immersed in the artistic context of the Underground Art scene of the early 1990s of New York. In the street, a young student of philosophy and criticism at The Village Voice, Israel Williams, meets Austin, an old man hurt and desperately in love with a soap opera star. Although he was stabbed several times, Austin does not seem to be affected by his injuries and refuses to go to see a doctor. He asks Israel to help him find his alienated son. Things get complicated when Israel discovers that the old man turns out to be a murderer. Israel is soon losing itself in a strange world populated by international celebrities, Marxist employees, and postmodern literary critics.

Shortly summed up as an absurdist odyssey through downtown Manhattan with a sweet old serial killer, a student rock-music critic, and international bohemians. The film is centered around the curious student Israel and the knife-happy Austin. Criminals in the film are desensitized and/or numb, with themes centralized around death, confusion, craziness, cowardice and loneliness. There are certainly more questions raised than answers given and the narrative seems to unfold in a way that parallels the narrative that is life. The film is primarily shot in color during which the audio, or music, seems to undermine the visuals through a technique of cutting in and out quickly. Ruiz jumps back and forth quite a bit from color to black and white visuals, during which the music seems to play a different role, for during the black and white shots the music seems to add to the visuals in a hyper-melodramatic way.

== Cast and Crew ==
Michael Kirby - Austin
Federico Muchnik - Israel Williams
Brett Alexander - Doc
Mary Hestand - Alina
Michael Stumm - Tony Luna
Kate Valk - Amelia Lopes

Production Design by Sermin Kardestuncer
Art Direction by Flavia Galuppo
Cinematography by Maryse Alberti
Sound Design by Piero Mura
Edited by Sylvia Waliga
Music by John Zorn
Associate Producers: Scott Macaulay, Dimitri de Clercq and Jacques de Clercq
Produced by James Schamus & Jordi Torrent
Written and Directed by Raúl Ruiz

== Reception ==
The film was generally well-received at its time, described as “somewhat plotted than the standard Ruiz pastiche.” “Reality, dream and time merge in a vertiginous warped continuum. Ruiz seems to be suggesting that human redemption and spiritual resurrection are possible in the most benighted landscapes. None of this is meant to be taken too seriously.” The reviewer for Variety claims that Ruiz “benefits from working in English and on location in New York. Although unmistakably a Ruiz concoction, “The Golden Boat” has a punchy contemporary atmosphere lacking in his French-language museum pieces. Bizarre editing and no-frills cinematography make for arrestingly disconcerting images that evoke a cockeyed alternative universe.”

J. Hoberman for The Village Voice:
The least one can say for The Golden Boat is that it should show would-be purveyors of ironic noir how it’s done. In addition to the requisite impossible camera angles and loop-de-loop dialogue, the movie is characterized by its bloody tableaux, circular structure, and pervasive hacienda music. The locations range from a Bowery flophouse to Mary Boone's loft to a pink-walled Loisaida apartment, and there’s some superb local color: the garbage that stews some Soho alley includes a half dozen pairs of shoes.

Caryn James for The New York Times:
“The Golden Boat” will be shown at midnight as part of the New York Film Festival, and though that slot is an appropriate tribute to its hip, cult sensibility, the film deserves prime time. Mr. Ruiz's absurdist wit and skewed visual style have rarely been so accessible. His often laborious artistic imagery has never been so distant as it is from this slight, gleeful work. The twisty narrative line is as smooth and nonsensical as the film's opening shot, in which the camera glides at ankle level through garbage-strewn gutters, following a trail of abandoned shoes. But unlike most Ruiz films, “The Golden Boat” at least has a narrative, however loopy it may be.
