= The Bacchae =

Ancient Greek tragedy by Euripides

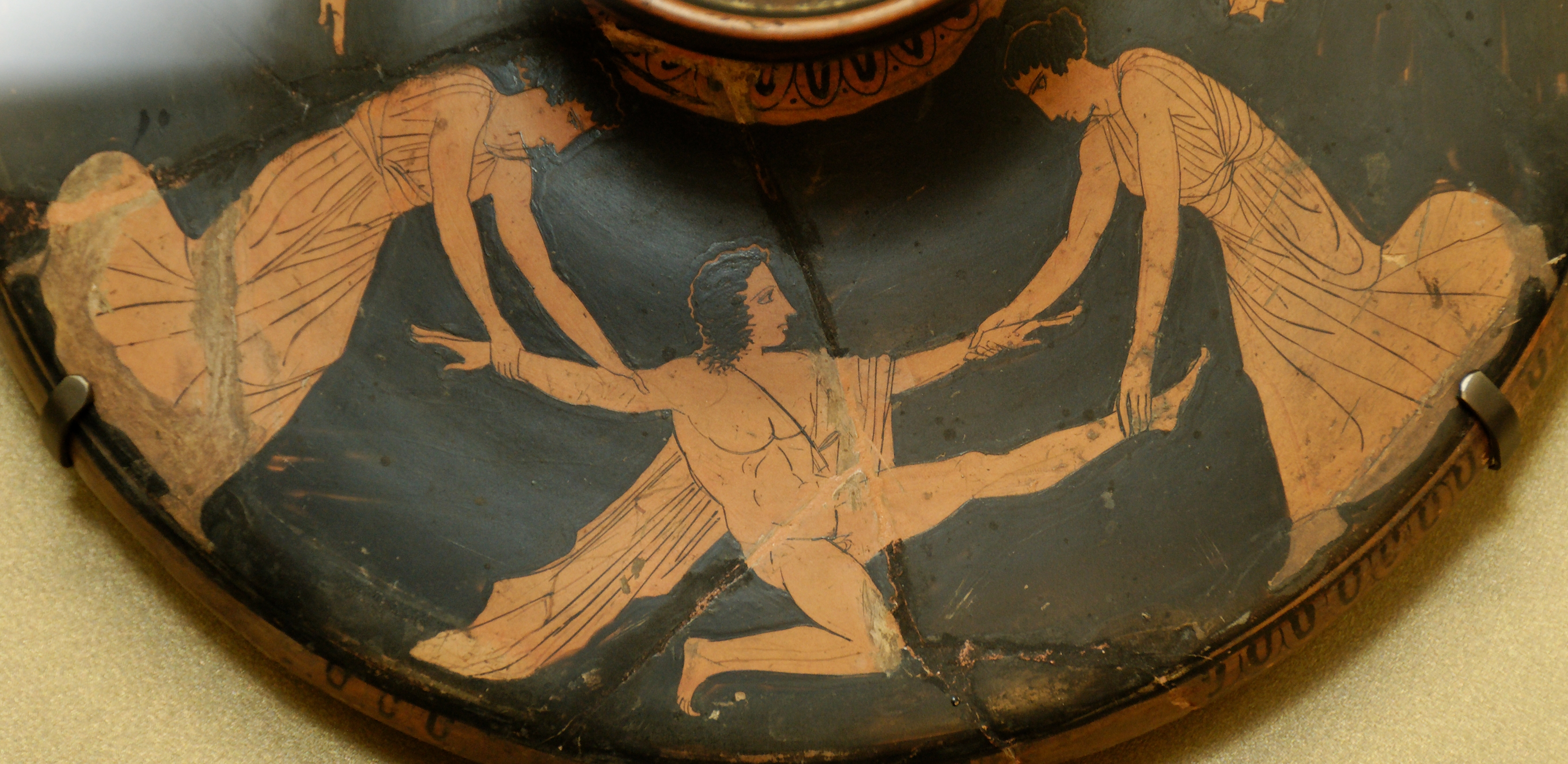
- Pentheus being torn apart by Agave and Ino, Attic red-figure vase painting, c. 450-425 BC
- Original language: Ancient Greek
- Written by: Euripides
- Chorus: Bacchae, female followers of Dionysus
- Characters: Dionysus; Tiresias; Cadmus; Pentheus; Servant; Messenger; Second Messenger; Agave
- Genre: Tragedy
- Setting: Thebes

Premiere
- Date: 405 BC
- Place: Athens

The Bacchae (/ˈbækiː/; Ancient Greek: Βάκχαι, Bakkhai; also known as The Bacchantes /ˈbækənts, bəˈkænts, -ˈkɑːnts/) is an ancient Greek tragedy, written by the Athenian playwright Euripides during his final years in Macedonia, at the court of Archelaus I of Macedon. It premiered posthumously at the Theatre of Dionysus in 405 BC as part of a tetralogy that also included Iphigeneia at Aulis and Alcmaeon in Corinth, and which Euripides' son or nephew is assumed to have directed. It won first prize in the City Dionysia festival competition.

The tragedy recounts the Greek myth of King Pentheus of Thebes and his mother Agave, who were punished by the god Dionysus (who is Pentheus's cousin) for rejecting his cult. The play opens with Dionysus proclaiming that he has arrived in Thebes with his votaries to avenge the slander, repeated by his aunts, that he is not the son of Zeus. Disguised as a foreign holy man, the god intends to introduce Dionysian rites into the city, but the Thebans reject his divinity and king Pentheus orders his arrest.

Eventually, Dionysus drives Pentheus insane, luring him to the mountains. The play ends with the women of Thebes, driven by Dionysus's orgiastic frenzy, tearing Pentheus apart, while his mother Agave bears his head on a thyrsus to her father Cadmus.

Regarded as Euripides' masterpiece, The Bacchae is classified among the greatest ancient tragedies. The Bacchae is distinctive in that the chorus is integrated into the plot and the god is not a distant presence, but a character in the play, indeed, the protagonist.

== Background ==
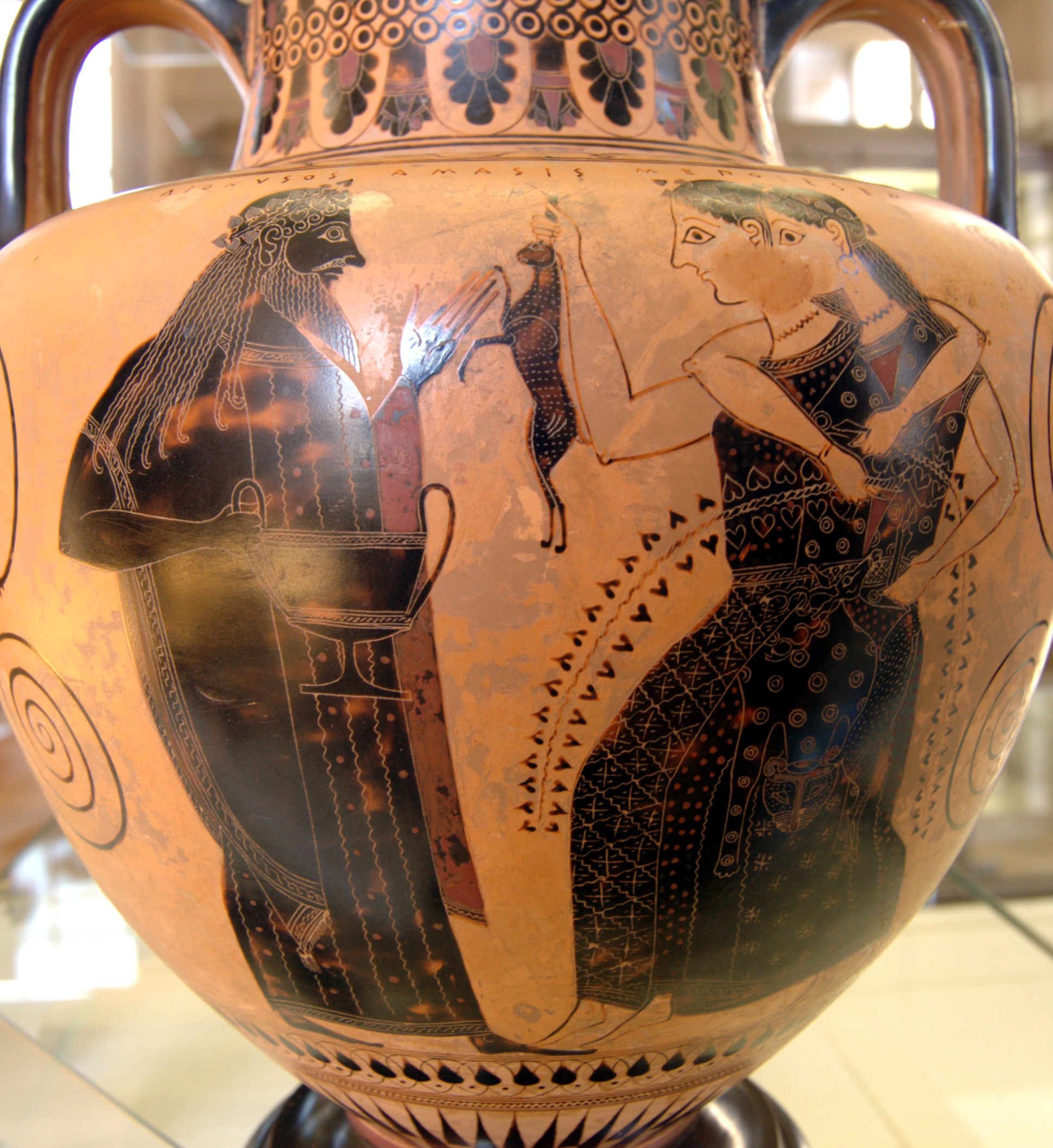
Dionysus with two Maenads, female worshipers and part of his retinue. c. 550–530 BC

The Dionysus in Euripides' tale is a young god, angry that his mortal family, the royal house of Cadmus, has denied him a place of honor as a deity. His mortal mother, Semele, was a mistress of Zeus; and while pregnant, was tricked by a jealous Hera to request Zeus to come to her in his true form. Being only a mortal, she was struck down by Zeus' thunderbolts while in his presence and was killed.

Zeus then saved Dionysus, who was in Semele's womb, by sewing him into a cavity in his thigh. When Semele died, her sisters said it was Zeus' will and accused her of lying; they also accused their father, Cadmus, of claiming Semele was pregnant by Zeus to cover up an affair with a mortal man. Most of Semele's family refused to believe Dionysus was the son of Zeus, and the young god was spurned by his household. He traveled throughout Asia and other foreign lands, gathering a cult of female worshipers, the Maenads.

At the start of the play, Dionysus returns to Thebes, disguised as a stranger, to take revenge on the house of Cadmus. He has also driven the women of Thebes, including his aunts, into an ecstatic frenzy, sending them dancing and hunting on Mount Cithaeron, much to the horror of the young Pentheus, king of Thebes who also is Dionysus' cousin. Complicating matters, Pentheus has declared a ban on the worship of Dionysus throughout Thebes.

== Plot ==
The play begins before the palace at Thebes, with Dionysus telling the story of his birth and his reasons for visiting the city. Dionysus explains he is the son of a mortal woman, Semele, and a god, Zeus. Some in Thebes, he notes, do not believe this story. In fact, Semele's sisters—Autonoë, Agave, and Ino—claim it is a lie intended to cover up the fact that Semele became pregnant by some mortal. Dionysus reveals that he has driven the women of the city mad, including his three aunts, and has led them into the mountains to observe his ritual festivities. He has disguised himself as a mortal for the time being, but he plans to vindicate his mother by appearing before all of Thebes as a god, the son of Zeus, and establishing his permanent cult of followers.

Dionysus exits to the mountains, and the chorus (composed of the titular Bacchae) enters. They perform a choral ode in praise of Dionysus. Then Tiresias, the blind and elderly seer, appears. He calls for Cadmus, the founder and former king of Thebes. The two old men start out to join the revelry in the mountains when Cadmus’ petulant young grandson Pentheus, the current king, enters. Disgusted to find the two old men in festival dress, he scolds them and orders his soldiers to arrest anyone engaging in Dionysian worship, including the mysterious "foreigner" who has introduced this worship. Pentheus intends to have him stoned to death.

The guards soon return with Dionysus himself in tow. Pentheus questions him, both skeptical of and fascinated by the Dionysian rites. Dionysus's answers are cryptic. Infuriated, Pentheus has Dionysus taken away and chained to an angry bull in the palace stable, but the god shows his power. He breaks free and razes the palace with an earthquake and fire.

Dionysus and Pentheus are once again at odds when a herdsman arrives from the top of Mount Cithaeron, where he had been herding his grazing cattle. He reports that he found women on the mountain behaving strangely: wandering the forest, suckling animals, twining snakes in their hair, and performing miraculous feats. The herdsmen and the shepherds made a plan to capture one particular celebrant, Pentheus' mother. But when they jumped out of hiding to grab her, the Bacchae became frenzied and pursued the men.

The men escaped, but their cattle were not so fortunate, as the women fell upon the animals, ripping them to shreds with their bare hands. The women carried on, plundering two villages that were further down the mountain, stealing bronze, iron and even babies. When villagers attempted to fight back, the women drove them off using only their ceremonial staffs of fennel. They then returned to the mountain top and washed up, as snakes licked them clean.

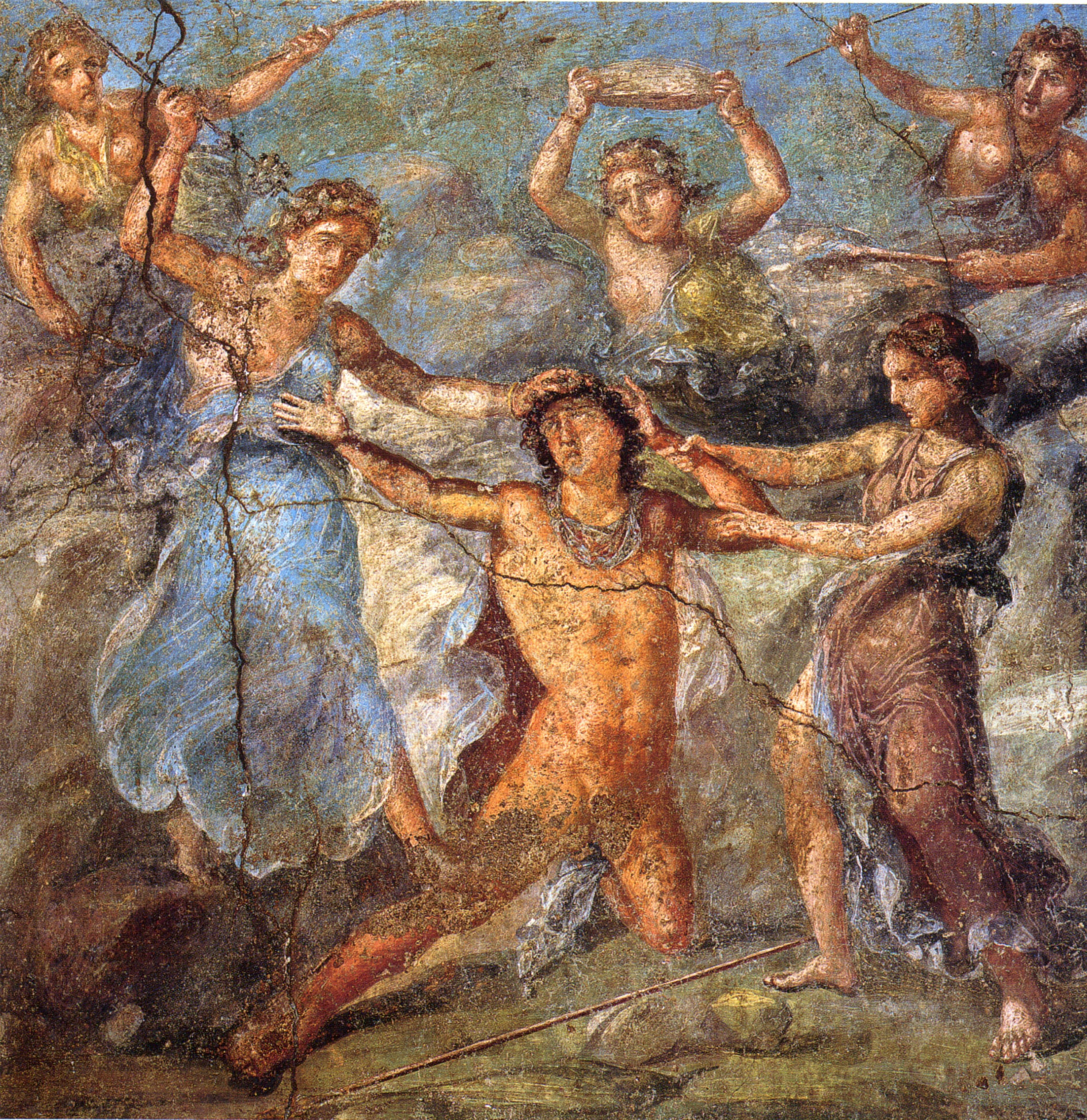
Roman fresco from Pompeii depicting Pentheus being torn apart by maenads.

Dionysus, still in disguise, persuades Pentheus to forgo his plan to defeat and massacre the women with an armed force. He says it would be better first to spy on them, while disguised as a female Maenad to avoid detection. Dressing Pentheus in this fashion, giving him a thyrsus and fawn skins, Dionysus leads him out of the house. At this point, Pentheus seems already crazed by the god's power, as he thinks he sees two suns in the sky, and believes he now has the strength to rip up mountains with his bare hands. He has also begun to see through Dionysus' mortal disguise, perceiving horns coming out of the god's head. They exit to Cithaeron.

A messenger arrives to report that once the party reached Mount Cithaeron, Pentheus wants to climb an evergreen tree to get a better view and the stranger uses divine power to bend down the tall tree and place the king in its highest branches. Then Dionysus, revealing himself, calls out to his followers and points out the man in the tree. This drives the Maenads wild. Led by Agave, his mother, they force the trapped Pentheus down from the tree top, rip off his limbs and his head, and tear his body into pieces.

After the messenger has relayed this news, Agave arrives, carrying her son's bloodied head. In her god-maddened state, she believes it is the head of a mountain lion. She proudly displays it to her father, Cadmus, and is confused when he does not delight in her trophy, but is horrified by it. Agave then calls out for Pentheus to come marvel at her feat, and nail the head above her door so she can show it to all of Thebes. But now the madness begins to wane, and Cadmus forces her to recognize that she has destroyed her own son.

As the play ends, the corpse of Pentheus is reassembled as well as is possible, and the royal family is devastated and destroyed. Agave and her sisters are sent into exile, and Dionysus decrees that Cadmus and his wife Harmonia will be turned into snakes and lead a barbarian horde to plunder the cities of Hellas.

== In classical history ==
In his biography of the Roman statesman and general Marcus Licinius Crassus, the ancient historian Plutarch claims that after his defeat and death at the Battle of Carrhae in 53 BC, Crassus' head was sent to the king of Parthia, Orodes II, where it was used "as a prop, standing in for the head of the tragic Pentheus" in a production of The Bacchae.

== Modern productions ==
=== Dramatic versions ===
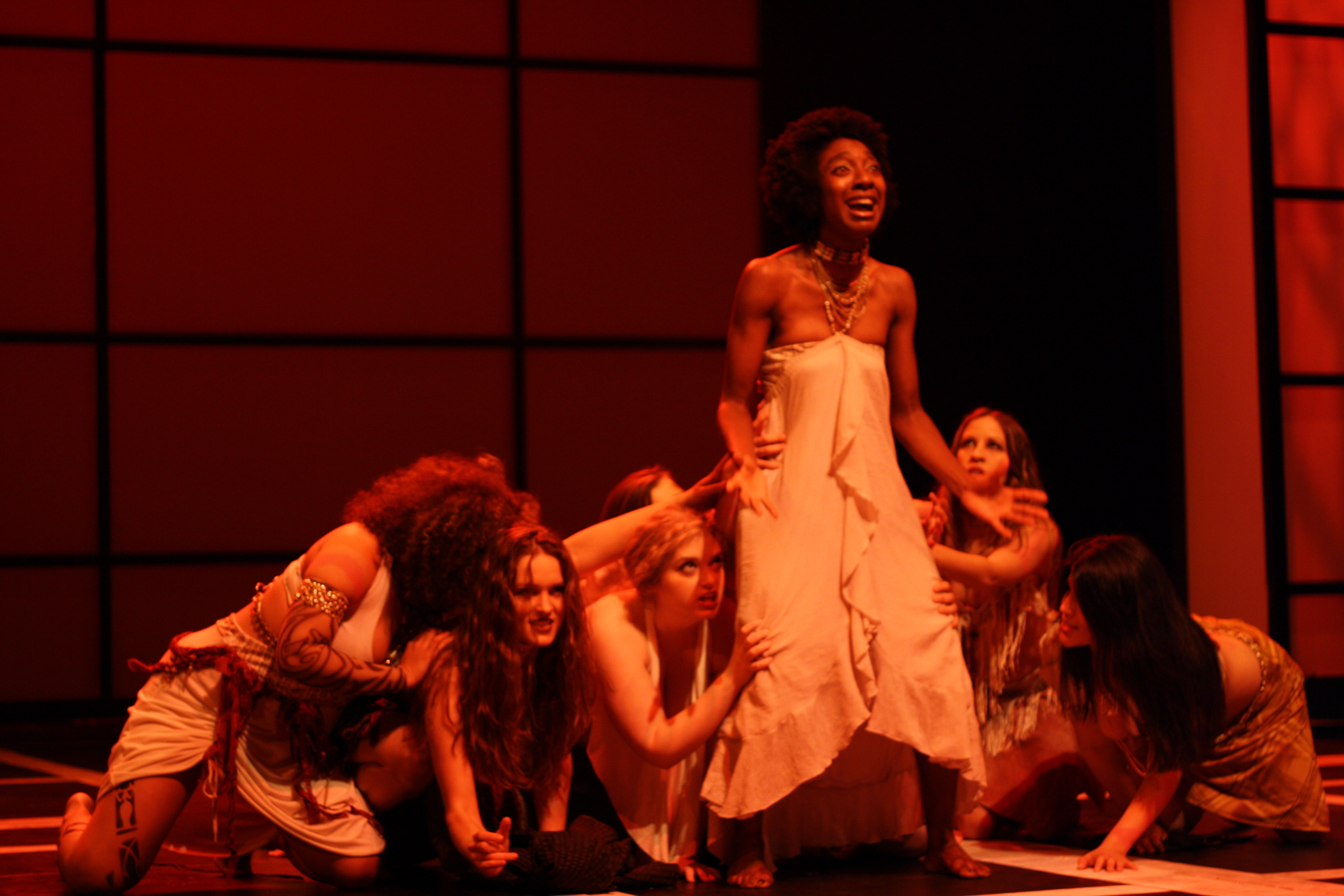
American student production, 2012

- Joe Orton's play The Erpingham Camp (television broadcast 27 June 1966; opened at the Royal Court Theatre on 6 June 1967) relocates The Bacchae to a British holiday camp. An author's note states: "No attempt must be made to reproduce the various locales in a naturalistic manner. A small, permanent set of Erpingham's office is set on a high level. The rest of the stage is an unlocalised area. Changes of scene are suggested by lighting and banners after the manner of the Royal Shakespeare Company's productions of Shakespeare's histories."
- In 1970, Brian De Palma filmed Richard Schechner's dramatic re-envisioning of the work, Dionysus in 69, in a converted garage.
- Wole Soyinka adapted the play as The Bacchae of Euripides: A Communion Rite with the British Royal National Theatre in London in 1973, incorporating a second chorus of slaves to mirror the civil unrest in his native Nigeria.
- Caryl Churchill and David Lan used the play as the basis of their 1986 dance-theatre hybrid A Mouthful of Birds.
- In 1989 Costas Ferris adapted The Bacchae for his film Oh Babylon and retells it in a more modern guise.
- Andre Gregory related in My Dinner With Andre that he put on a production at Yale University and campaigned to have a real cadaver's head used for Pentheus', but the actress playing Agave refused.
- The Bacchae 2.1, a theatrical adaptation set in modern times, was written by Charles Mee and first performed in 1993.
- Swedish director Ingmar Bergman directed The Bacchae three times: as an opera (1991) for the Royal Swedish Opera, as a film (1993) for Sveriges Television, and on stage (1996) for the Royal Dramatic Theatre in Stockholm. These three versions received great acclaim amidst some mixed reviews.

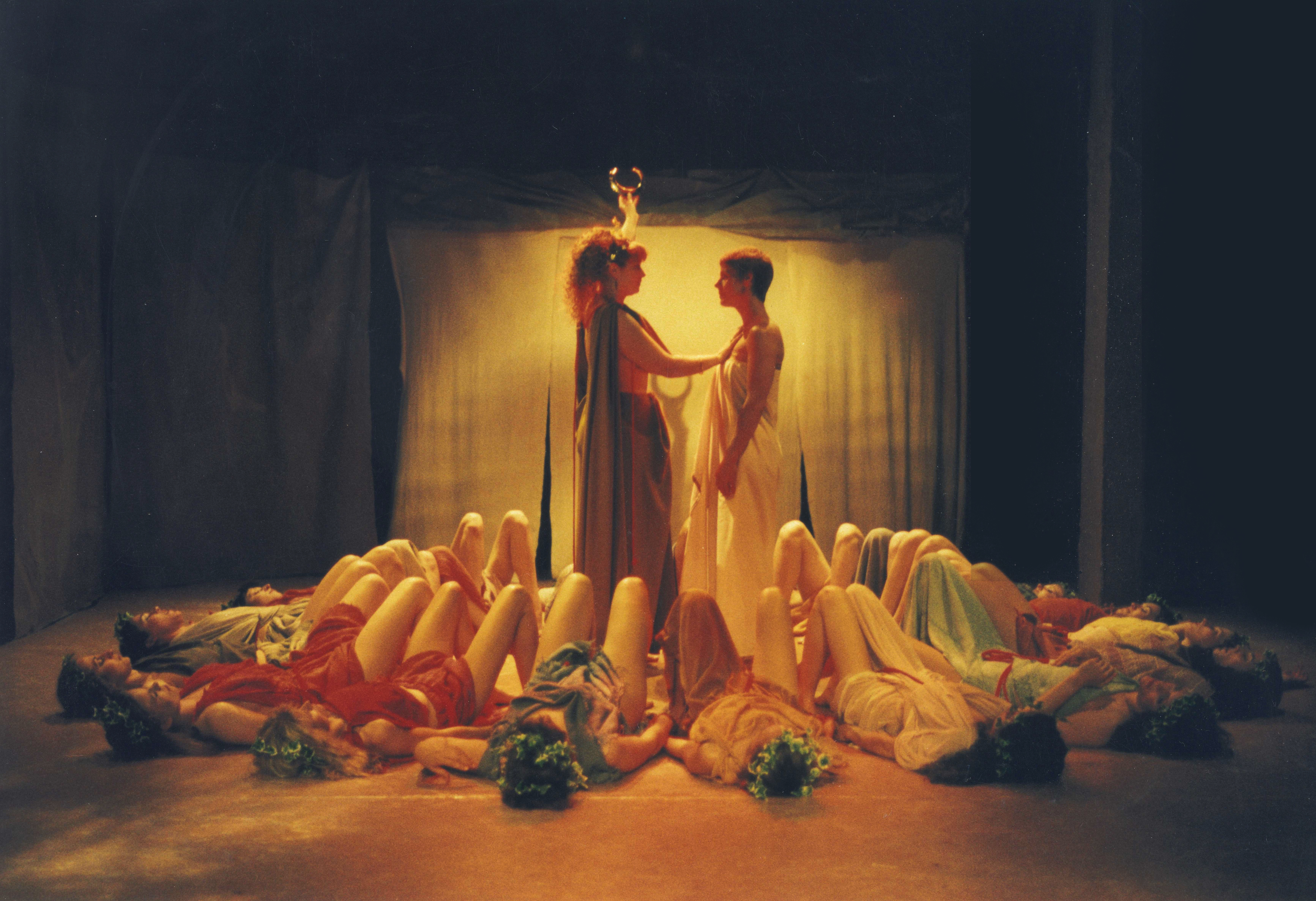
Ramona Reeves and Lynn Odell in director Brad Mays' stage production of Euripides' The Bacchae, 1997, Los Angeles

- In 1997, Brad Mays directed his own adaptation of the play at The Complex in Los Angeles, where it broke all box office records and was nominated for three LA Weekly Theater Awards: for Best Direction, Best Musical Score and Best Production Design. Because it featured levels of violence and nudity rare for even experimental theater, it was widely discussed in print, and even videotaped for the Lincoln Center's Billy Rose Theatre Collection in New York. The production was eventually made into an independent feature film which featured Will Shepherd – the Pentheus of Richard Schechner's Dionysus in '69 – as Cadmus. Both the stage and film versions were produced by Mays' wife, Lorenda Starfelt.
- On 20 April 2003 BBC Radio 3 premiered the radio play Dionysos – a ninety-minute drama based on The Bacchae – written by Andrew Rissik and starring Chiwetel Ejiofor, with Paul Scofield as Cadmus, Toby Stephens as Pentheus and Diana Rigg as Agave. It was repeated on BBC Radio 7 in May 2008.
- In 2004, KneeHigh Theatre company toured a reinvented version of The Bacchae as "A contemporary postmodern folk tale", directed by Emma Rice.
- In 2007, David Greig wrote an adaptation of The Bacchae for the National Theatre of Scotland starring Alan Cumming as Dionysus, with ten soul-singing followers in place of the traditional Greek chorus. A critically praised run at New York's Lincoln Center Rose Theater followed the premiere in Scotland.

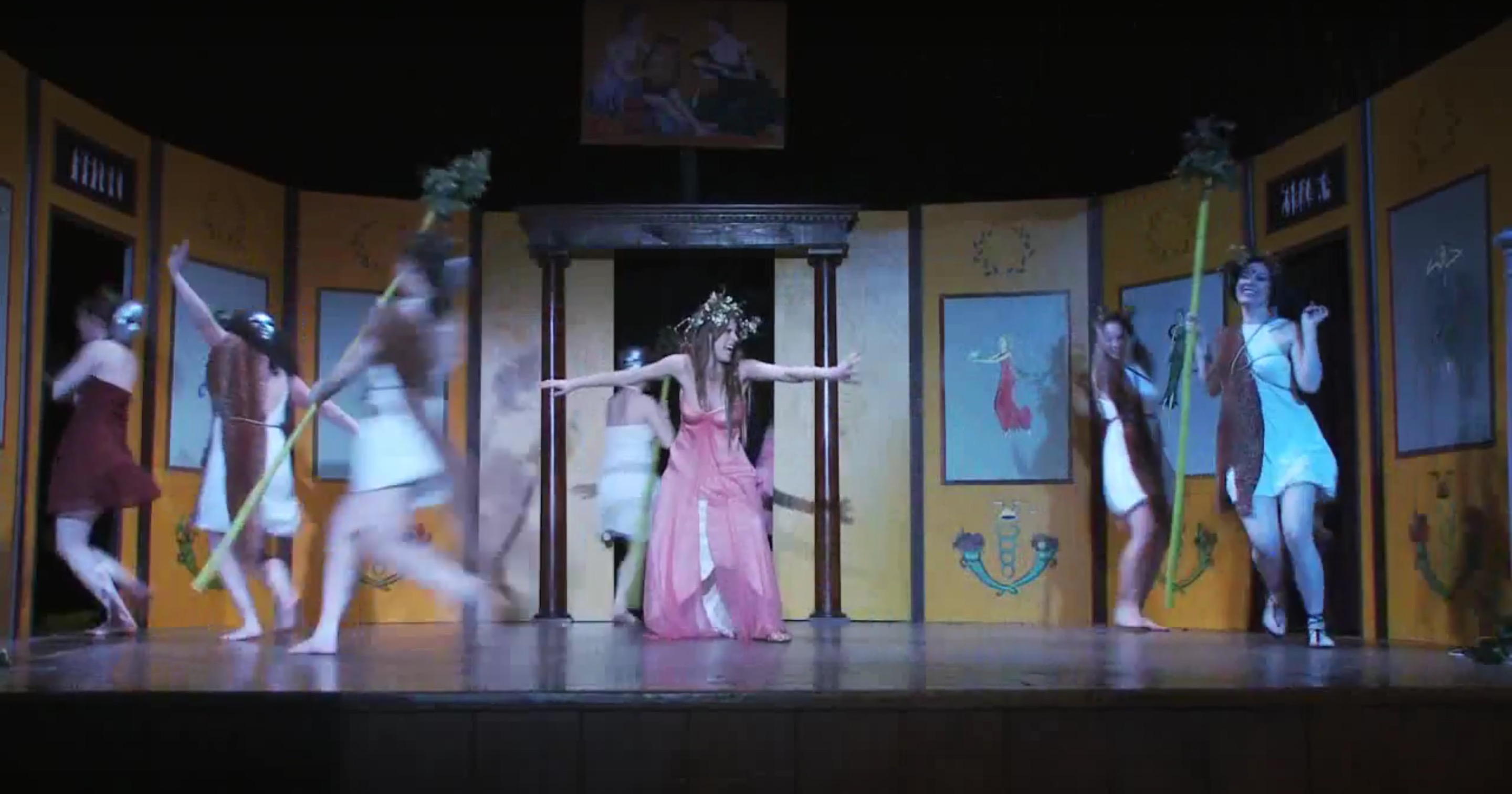
Mia Perovetz plays Dionysos in the MacMillan Films staging of The Bacchae as part of their Greek Drama educational series.

- Luigi Lo Cascio's multimedia adaptation La Caccia (The Hunt) won the Biglietto d'Oro del Teatro prize in 2008. The free adaptation combines live theater with animations by Nicola Console and Desideria Rayner's video projections. A revised 2009 version went on tour with original music by Andrea Rocca.
- In 2008, James Thomas directed Peter Arnott's faithful and audience-friendly translation of The Bacchae as part of MacMillan Films series on Greek drama. The production featured Mia Perovetz as Dionysus, a traditional Greek chorus with Morgan Marcum as the chorus leader and the dance choreography of Angessa Hughmanick.
- In 2017, Madeleine George's adaptation Hurricane Diane premiered at Two River Theater. Hurricane Diane places the narrative in Monmouth, New Jersey, where Dionysus becomes Diane, a butch landscaper who schemes to install permaculture gardens in suburban backyards, and convince four women to start a "mystery cult" in order to regain her powers and fight climate change.
- In 2020, the Classics department of King's College London performed a version of The Bacchae in its original ancient Greek in combination with Aristophanes' The Frogs, created by David Bullen and entitled Dionysus in the Underworld for their annual Greek play, which is the only production of Greek drama in the UK staged annually in the original language.
- In 2023, Sleepwalk immersive debuted immersive production 'Bacchanalia' based upon the play in the crypt of St Peter's Church, Bethnal Green.
- In 2024, Las niñas de Cádiz toured Las bingueras de Eurípides ("The bingo-playing women of Euripides"), a free version in which Dionysus appears as a woman, Dionisia, among a group of middle-aged women from Cádiz, Spain, meeting for clandestine bingo games and opposed by a local policeman. The play adds elements from the carnival of Cádiz.
- In 2025, Indhu Rubasingham directed an adaptation, written by Nima Taleghani, at the Royal National Theater in London with a recording released in 2026. The production was notable for its use of contemporary British rap culture and increased focus on the Bacchae.

=== Operatic versions ===
- In 1941, Giorgio Federico Ghedini began composing an opera in Italian based on The Bacchae and called Le Baccanti, with libretto by playwright and screenwriter Tullio Pinelli. It debuted at La Scala in Milan on February 22, 1948. It was revived in Milan in 1972.
- Harry Partch composed an opera based on The Bacchae titled Revelation in the Courthouse Park. It was first performed in 1960, and a recording was released in 1987.
- Another opera based on The Bacchae, called The Bassarids, was composed in 1965 by Hans Werner Henze. The libretto was by W. H. Auden and Chester Kallman.
- John Buller composed an opera Bakxai (The Bacchae) which was produced at the English National Opera in London in 1992. The Libretto was in ancient Greek.
- Georgia Spiropoulos composed a solo opera for performer, electronics and lights called Les Bacchantes. The work premiered at Ircam during the 2010 Agora Festival, starring Médéric Collignon.
- Karol Szymanowski's second opera King Roger is based on The Bacchae.
- Daniel Börtz' opera Backanterna (Swedish for the Bacchae) is based on The Bacchae. The opera premiered at the Royal Swedish Opera in Stockholm in 1991. The music was used in Ingmar Bergman's 1993 TV opera film.

=== Musical versions ===
- Gustav Holst's "Hymn to Dionysus" (Op. 31, No. 2) is a setting for female voices and orchestra of the parodos from The Bacchae in the translation by Gilbert Murray. It was composed in 1913 and premiered in 1914.
- In Fall 2007, Prospect Theater Company put on The Rockae, a rock musical adaption of the show written by Peter Mills & Cara Reichel
- In Summer 2009, the Public Theater (of New York City) produced a version of The Bacchae with music by Philip Glass.
- In Fall 2013, Shakespeare's Globe produced a musical adaptation of The Bacchae, The Lightning Child, written by Ché Walker. Music was scored by Arthur Darvill.
- In 2026, the Joburg Theatre put on The Bacchae: An African Choral Ballet, an adaption using a blend of classical ballet, African movement, choral music and a live orchestra. Composed by Neo Muyanga, choreographed by Mthuthuzeli November and directed by Jay Pather.

=== Film versions ===
- In 1961 Italian filmmaker Giorgio Ferroni directed his own adaptation of the tragedy as Le baccanti, with French actor Pierre Brice as Dionysus, Italian actors Alberto Lupo and Miranda Campa respectively as Pentheus and Agave, Finnish actress-dancer Taina Elg as Dirce, and Russian actor Akim Tamiroff as Tiresias. American choreographer Herbert Ross directed the bacchantes' dance sequences.
- In 1970 American filmmaker Brian De Palma and theater director Richard Schechner filmed the stage adaptation Dionysus in '69, performed by members of The Performance Group, an experimental theater group in New York that would later become The Wooster Group.

== Religious significance ==
Greek theater was a form of religious expression and worship. The Bacchae re-enacts how Dionysus had come to be a god. In ancient Greek theatre, "role-playing is a well-known feature of ritual liminality."

To an actor, religious worship is a direct experience. The actor would have experienced a "stepping out" of himself to become a representation of Dionysus. As a spectator, the experience comes from what is acted onstage, arousing emotions that sympathize with Dionysus. Collectively, through Dionysiac acting, there is a reintegration of the "other" into the "self", that is to say that Dionysus has been accepted and will be worshipped by the Greek people.

=== Comparative analysis ===
Jesus's interrogation by Pontius Pilate in The Bible has been compared to Dionysus's interrogation by King Pentheus regarding his claim to divinity. Indeed, some scholars argue that numerous passages throughout the New Testament are mimetic or even quotations of passages of The Bacchae.

== Dramatic structure ==
In the play's climactic plot construction, Dionysus the protagonist instigates the unfolding action by simultaneously emulating the play's author, costume designer, choreographer and artistic director. Helene P. Foley, writing of the importance of Dionysus as the central character and his effect on the play's structure, observes: "The poet uses the ritual crisis to explore simultaneously god, man, society, and his own tragic art. In this protodrama Dionysus, the god of the theatre, stage-directs the play."

According to the analysis by Ian C. Johnston, at the play's start, Dionysus' exposition highlights the play's central conflict: the invasion of Greece by an Asian religion.

== Reception ==
The Bacchae has been the subject of widely varying interpretations regarding what the play as a whole means, or even indeed whether there is a “moral” to the story. Hans Oranje calls such questions the riddle of the Bacchae, and says that the play concerns itself with “wisdom, cleverness, and soundness of mind.” The extraordinary beauty and passion of the poetic choral descriptions indicate that the author certainly knew what attracted those who followed Dionysus. The vivid gruesomeness of the punishment of Pentheus suggests that he could also understand those who were troubled by religion.

At one time the interpretation that prevailed was that the play was an expression of Euripides’ religious devotion, as though after a life of being critical of the Greek gods and their followers, the author finally repented of his cynicism, and wrote a play that honors Dionysus and that carries a dire warning to nonbelievers. At the end of the 19th century, the opposite idea began to take hold: it was thought that Euripides was doing with The Bacchae what he had always done, pointing out the inadequacy of the Greek gods and religions.

Until the late 19th century, the play's themes were considered too gruesome to be studied and appreciated. It was Nietzsche's "Birth of Tragedy" in 1872 that posed anew the question of Dionysus's relation with the theatre and awakened interest in The Bacchae. In the 20th century, performances became quite fashionable—particularly in opera, due in part to the dramatic choruses found throughout the story. In 1948, R.P. Winnington-Ingram said of Euripides' handling of the play: "On its poetical and dramatic beauties, he writes with charm and insight; on more complex themes, he shows equal mastery." Recent criticism has been provided by P.E. Easterling, et al. in The Cambridge Companion to Greek Tragedy.

== Influences ==
The Bacchae had an enormous impact on ancient literature, and its influence can be seen in numerous Greek and Roman authors. It seems to have been one of Horace's favorite tragedies. Some scholars have suggested that the Gospel of John is based upon The Bacchae.

Beyond antiquity, dramatists and filmmakers of all ages have been greatly impacted by it. The tragedy's influence can be seen in the writings of Henrik Ibsen, as well as Thomas Mann's 1912 novella Death in Venice and Oliver Stone's 2004 film Alexander. The Renaissance Venetian painter Titian may have illustrated the arrest of Bacchus in his painting "Il Bravo" in Vienna's Kunsthistorisches Museum.

=== In popular culture ===
- Donna Tartt's 1992 novel The Secret History is about six students of ancient Greek who go in search of the rapture described by Euripides in The Bacchae.
- J. M. Tolcher's 2023 autobiography, Poof, makes direct reference to The Bacchae: Dionysus and Pentheus return as characters, and the book addresses many of the same themes such as femininity, intoxication, and liberation from oppression in a contemporary Australian setting.

== Translations ==
- Robert Potter, 1781: verse full text
- Theodore Alois Buckley, 1850: prose
- Henry Hart Milman, 1865: verse
- Edward P. Coleridge, 1891: prose
- Arthur S. Way, 1898: verse
- Gilbert Murray, 1904: verse
- D. W. Lucas, 1930: prose
- Moses Hadas and John McLean, 1936: prose
- Philip Vellacott, 1954: prose and verse
- F. L. Lucas, 1954: verse
- Henry Birkhead, 1957: verse
- William Arrowsmith, 1958: verse
- Paul Roche, 1969: verse
- Geoffrey Kirk, 1970: prose and verse
- Wole Soyinka, 1973
- Philip Vellacott, 1973
- Robert Bagg, 1978: verse (as The Bakkhai)
- Michael Cacoyannis, 1982: verse
- Matt Neuberg, 1988: verse
- Arthur Evans, 1988, prose and verse, as The God of Ecstasy (St. Martin's Press)
- Derek Mahon, 1991
- Nicholas Rudall, 1996
- Richard Seaford, 1996: prose
- Frederic Raphael and Kenneth McLeish, 1998
- Daniel Mark Epstein, 1998: verse
- Stephen J. Esposito, 1998
- Paul Woodruff, 1999: verse
- James Morwood, 1999
- Reginald Gibbons, 2000: verse ISBN 0-19-512598-3
- David Franklin, 2000: prose
- David Kovacs, 2003
- Ian C. Johnston, 2003: verse
- Colin Teevan, 2003: verse (as "Bacchai")
- George Theodoridis, 2005: prose
- Michael Valerie, 2005: verse
- Michael Scanlan, 2006: verse (La Salle Academy: Providence, RI)
- Graham Kirby, 2009: verse (The Scoop)
- Che Walker, 2013: play with songs as The Lightning Child
- Robin Robertson, 2014: verse
- Anne Carson, 2015: verse (as The Bakkhai)
- David Stuttard, 2016: verse
- Emily Wilson, 2016: verse
- Emma Pauly, 2019: prose and verse
- Brian Vinero, 2020: rhymed verse

== See also ==
- Apollonian and Dionysian
