= Kate Valk =

American actor and performance artist

- Born: March 6, 1957 (age 69); Spokane, Washington, U.S.
- Education: Tisch School of the Arts, New York University
- Occupations: Actress; performance artist
- Years active: 1979–present
- Known for: Founding member of The Wooster Group

Kate Valk (born March 6, 1957) is a founding member of The Wooster Group, a collective of artists who make new work for the theater. Kate Valk began her work with the group in 1979 while she was a student at New York University's Tisch School of the Arts.

In 2003 she was awarded a Foundation for Contemporary Arts Grants to Artists Award, and in 2006, the New York Times published an article featuring Valk.

== Early life ==
Kate Valk was born on March 7, 1956, in Spokane, Washington. Her mother was a nurse, while her father was a jack-of-all-trades; he worked, at various times, at a cement company, a post office, a remodeling company, and on real estate ventures. They moved consistently during her childhood, including to Wisconsin, Pennsylvania, and Maryland. This lower-middle-class childhood did not give her much exposure to the arts. At age 16, she worked part-time at Shepherd Pratt, a nursing home. She attended Towson State in Baltimore, Maryland, for two years before moving to New York City at the age of 19 to pursue a career in theatre. She attended NYU in the studio program and worked with Stella Adler for two years. During her last semester, she worked with the Experimental Theatre Wing while the Wooster Group was teaching for the semester and really enjoyed her experience with them. During her time in NYC, she worked for Ding-a-Ling Taxi.

== Theatre career ==
After she finished college, she turned back to theatre and went to the Wooster Group in search of a job. She had worked as a seamstress during her time in the theatre, so starting in 1979, Elizabeth LeCompte hired her to work as a seamstress and for general help with production, including making props and transcribing. Her first role with the Wooster Group as an actress was in Route 1 & 9, an adaption of Thornton Wilder’s Our Town staged in 1981. She has appeared in every Wooster Group show since. She has also worked in film, appearing most notably in The Manchurian Candidate as Agent Volk. In recent years, she has founded two different arts education programs. One of them is an in-school theatre curriculum at Dr. Sun Yat Sen Middle School in Chinatown, founded in 1992. The other arts education program is a free, three-week summer program for high school students, called the Wooster Group’s Summer Institute, founded in 1997.

== Stage credits ==
Her stage credits include:

The Hairy Ape as Mildred Douglas, 1997

Hamlet as Gertrude/Ophelia, 2007, at St. Ann’s Warehouse

The Emperor Jones as Brutus Jones, 2009, at Owen Bruner Goodman Theatre

North Atlantic as performer, 2010, at The Roy and Edna Disney/CalArts Theater

Vieux Carré as performer, 2010-2011, at The Roy and Edna Disney/CalArts Theater

Early Plays as performer, 2012, at St. Ann’s Warehouse

Cry, Trojans! as performer, 2014, at The Performing Garage

The Room as performer, 2015-2016, at The Performing Garage

== Film credits ==
Her film credits include:

The Golden Boat as Amelia Lopes (1990)

The Cabinet of Dr. Ramirez as Sue (1991)

Dead Flowers Alice (1992)

Fresh Kill (1994)

The Manchurian Candidate as Agent Volk (2004)

Utopians as Dr. L

== Sources ==
- The New Yorker
- Foundation For Contemporary Arts
- IMDb
- Bomb Magazine
- Broadway World
- New York Times
- About the Artists
