= Chris Baldwin =

Chris Baldwin may refer to:

- Christopher Baldwin (born 1973), American illustrator and webcomic author
- Chris Baldwin (cyclist) (born 1975), American cyclist
- Chris Baldwin (director), British theatre director, professor and writer
