= Performing Garage =

Off-off-Broadway theater in SoHo, New York City

Coordinates: 40°43′20.2″N 74°0′10.62″W

The Performing Garage
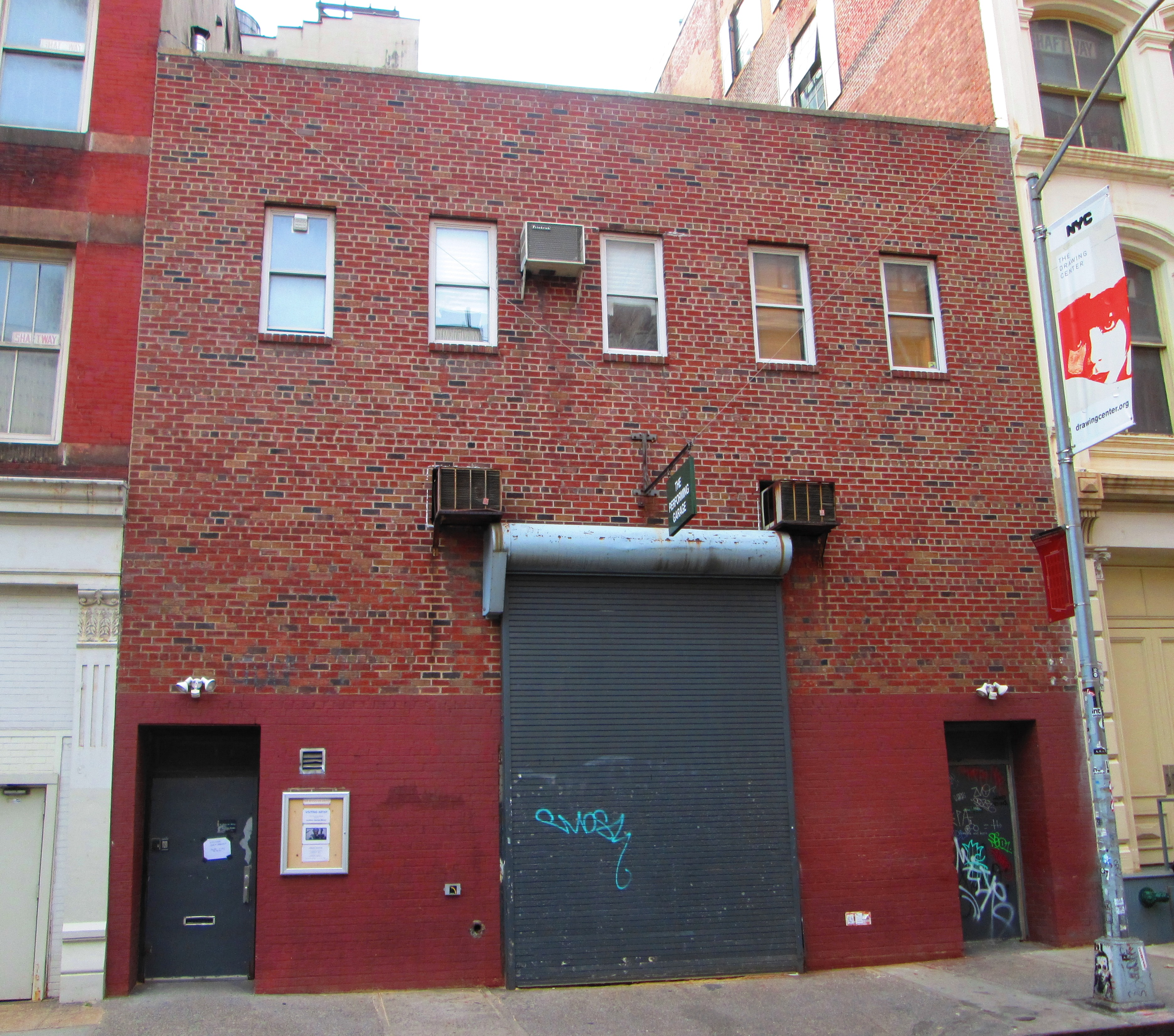
- The Performing Garage in 2014
- Interactive map of The Performing Garage
- Address: 33 Wooster Street (SoHo); New York City; United States
- Owner: The Performance Group (1968-1980), The Wooster Group (since 1980)
- Capacity: 60
- Type: Off-off-Broadway

Construction
- Opened: 1968

The Performing Garage is an off-off-Broadway theater in SoHo, New York City. Established in 1968, it is the permanent home of the experimental theater company originally named The Performance Group (under Richard Schechner) that morphed in 1980 into The Wooster Group (under Elizabeth LeCompte), and their primary performance venue.

Since 1978, it also hosts their annual "Visiting Artist Series" or "Emerging Artist Series". Located at 33 Wooster Street, it seats approximately 60. Actors such as Willem Dafoe debuted in earnest here and regularly come back.

== History ==
The location was originally not a garage but a metal stamping/flatware factory, back when SoHo was an empty warehouse district being colonized by artists. It was acquired in 1968 by its first artistic and theater director, Richard Schechner.

The Performing Garage was established there in 1968 as a home for Schechner's company The Performance Group (1967–1980), starting with Dionysus in 69 (1968). Because of the group's name, the theater is sometimes erroneously called the Performance Garage.

In 1975, some members began to develop their own productions and perform them at the Performing Garage but not under the name of The Performance Group, starting with Sakonnet Point (1975).

In 1980, Richard Schechner resigned as director and the Performing Garage became home to the troupe renamed The Wooster Group under Elizabeth LeCompte, with their 1975–1980 independent works being retroactively considered productions of the new Group.

The Performing Garage is owned and operated by the Wooster Group as a shareholder in the Grand Street Artists Co-op (originally established as part of the Fluxus art movement in the 1960s).

Located at 33 Wooster Street, it is one block north of Canal Street and one block east of West Broadway in SoHo, New York.

Spalding Gray performed the 1987 film version of his concert film Swimming to Cambodia at the Performing Garage, the film was directed by Jonathan Demme.

== Artist series ==
Since 1978, the Performing Garage has hosted an annual "Visiting Artist Series".

In 1999, they started an "Emerging Artist Series", a three-week program intended to spotlight up-and-coming multimedia performers by granting three individuals or groups a week of rehearsal time and a weekend of performances in the Performing Garage. Selected among 20 candidates, the first series featured:

1999

- Elliott Earls, Eye Sling Shot Lions
- Radiant Pig (country mystic folk-art band)
- Radiohole, A History of Heen: Not Francis E. Dec, Esq. — about Francis E. Dec
