= Ron Vawter =

American actor

- Born: December 9, 1948; Latham, New York, U.S.
- Died: April 16, 1994 (aged 45)
- Occupation: Actor

Ron Vawter (December 9, 1948 – April 16, 1994) was an American actor and a founding member of the experimental theater company The Wooster Group. Vawter performed in most of the group's works until his death from a heart attack in 1994 at the age of 45.

== Life and career ==
Vawter was born in Latham, New York, to Elton Lee Vawter (1925–1972) and Matilda Buttoni (1925–2010). Vawter's parents both served in the U.S. Navy during World War II, and Vawter himself enlisted in the U.S. Army on his 17th birthday. He later studied theology and literature at Siena College, where his mother was employed.

Although he had initially aspired to become a military chaplain, Vawter instead accepted work as an Army recruiter in Lower Manhattan. Vawter first became involved in acting when he joined an experimental theater troupe known as The Performance Group, whose SoHo theater he would pass by every day while walking to and from his recruiting office. Vawter, along with six other performers – including actor Willem Dafoe and Dafoe's longtime partner Elizabeth LeCompte – founded what would eventually become known as The Wooster Group.

During his time with the group, Vawter originated roles in Rumstick Road, Nayatt School, Point Judith (an epilog), Route 1 & 9, Hula, L.S.D. (...Just the High Points...), Frank Dell's The Temptation of Saint Antony, North Atlantic, and Brace Up!. He also appeared on video in Fish Story, and in the Group's video pieces White Homeland Commando and Flaubert Dreams of Travel but the Illness of His Mother Prevents It. Other of Vawter's performances included Mother Courage and Her Children (Bertolt Brecht), The Marilyn Project (David Gaard), Cops (Terry Curtis Fox), and The Balcony (Jean Genet) – all directed by Richard Schechner.

In addition to his 15-year work at the Performing Garage, Vawter appeared in Hollywood films, including King Blank, Philadelphia, The Silence of the Lambs, and Sex, Lies, and Videotape, generally playing character roles. He also performed in theatre pieces by Richard Foreman, Jeff Weiss, and Mabou Mines.

Vawter explored themes of sexual identity in his 1992 work for the stage, Roy Cohn/Jack Smith, two linked monologues that contrast the characters of two gay men who died of AIDS. The Jack Smith section was a re-creation of Smith's performance "What's Underground About Marshmallows?," and the Roy Cohn section was written by Gary Indiana. It was directed by Greg Mehrten and created with Clay Shirky and Marianne Weems. The piece was released as a film directed by Jill Godmilow in which the sections were intercut.

For 1993's Philadelphia, the film production company TriStar Pictures initially refused to insure Vawter, who was openly HIV-positive at the time, insisting director Jonathan Demme recast him. Demme refused, even changing the shooting schedule to accommodate Vawter after he was hospitalized for a month.

The Ron Vawter Papers is a collection that documents his career in motion pictures, television, and the theater; it includes production materials, scripts, photographs, slides, publicity material, personal papers, and correspondence. The collection is held by the New York Public Library for the Performing Arts.

== Death ==
Vawter was diagnosed with AIDS in 1991. For his final performance, he portrayed the titular role in Philoctetes Variations, about the ancient Greek warrior Philoctetes, whose wound smelled so intolerably noxious that he was banished to the uninhabited island of Lemnos and abandoned by his comrades-in-arms on the way to Troy. The play was written by John Jesurun at Vawter's own request, and was intended as a metaphor for the ostracizing effect of the AIDS disease. During Vawter's performance, lesions from Kaposi's Sarcoma were visible on the actor's body, who by then was in the advanced stages of the dreaded disease.

Vawter died in his sleep of an AIDS-related heart attack on April 16, 1994, while onboard a transatlantic flight from Zurich to New York City. He was returning home from Brussels, where he had just completed his work on Philoctetes Variations less than a month prior. At the time of his death, Vawter lived in the Greenwich Village neighborhood of Manhattan. Vawter was 45.

== Filmography ==
Ron Vawter film and television credits
Year	Title	Role	Notes
1977	Sudden Death	Businessman (uncredited)	Film
1979	Minus Zero	Freud	Film
1981	Strong Medicine	Max	Film
1983	Born in Flames	FBI Agent	Film
1983	King Blank	King Blank	Film
1987	The Equalizer	Lieutenant	Episode: "Inner View"
1989	Sex, Lies, and Videotape	Therapist	Film
1989	Twister	Man in Bar	Film
1989	Fat Man and Little Boy	Jamie Latrobe	Film
1990	Internal Affairs	Jaegar	Film
1991	The Silence of the Lambs	Paul Krendler	Film
1991	The Cabinet of Dr. Ramirez	Dr. Ramirez	Film
1991	Johnny Suede	Winston	Film
1992	Swoon	State's Attorney Crowe	Film
1993	King of the Hill	Mr. Desot - Hotel Manager (uncredited)	Film
1993	Philadelphia	Bob Seidman	Film
1994	Roy Cohn/Jack Smith	Roy Cohn / Jack Smith	Film
1994	Fresh Kill	Roger Bailey	Film (final role)
