= Bruce Odland =

American composer (born 1952)

- Born: Milwaukee, Wisconsin
- Education: Northwestern University
- Occupations: Composer, sound artist, sonic thinker
- Known for: Sonic installations, multi-media, virtual instruments
- Website: http://bruceodland.net/

Michael Bruce Odland, known as Bruce Odland, (born 1952 in Milwaukee) is a composer, sound artist and sonic thinker. He is known for large-scale sound installations in public spaces, creating unique instruments that reveal music inherent in natural and urban environments, and for his pioneering work in theater, film and interactive multi-media. He lives and works in Westchester County, New York. Odland's musical sculptures and sound installations have been shown in major cities such as New York, Berlin, and Zurich; in art museums including the Denver Art Museum, the Field Museum and Mass MoCA; and at the international documenta14, Ars Electronica, Edinburgh International and Salzburg Festivals. Many of his installations are collaborations with Austrian sound artist Sam Auinger, with whom he formed an artistic partnership O+A in 1989. Together they have created more than 50 sound installations in Europe, North America and Asia.

He pioneered virtual musical instruments in 2000 in the "Sounds from the Vaults" exhibition at the Field Museum in Chicago, which won the Gold Muse award from the American Alliance of Museums for best interactive media exhibit.

Odland has collaborated with many well-known theater directors, musicians and artists including Peter Sellars, Tina Packer, Robert Woodruff, JoAnne Akalaitis, Tony Oursler, Dan Graham, Laurie Anderson, André Gregory, Jennifer Tipton, George Tsypin, Wallace Shawn and the Wooster Group.

Odland has lectured and led workshops at many institutions, including: Tisch School of the Arts, New York University; Cooper Union; Pratt Institute; Yale University; Harvard University School of Design; Cal Arts; Massachusetts Institute of Technology; and The Bartlett School of Architecture, London; Technische Universität Berlin; University of Art, Berlin; and Insa Art Institute, Seoul, Korea.

He is founding director of the Tank Center for Sonic Arts in Rangely, Colorado.

== Biography ==
=== Early career ===
Bruce Odland grew up in Janesville, Wisconsin and graduated from Northwestern University, Chicago, in 1974 with a degree in composition and conducting. While there he became fascinated with electronic music, experimenting on an early Moog synthesizer. However, soon after graduating, Odland's interest turned to the "sounds inherent in processes and things". He departed from his classical music training to seek out the sounds, rhythms and harmonies of natural environments.

In 1976 Odland moved to Denver, Colorado where he was recruited as musical director/sound artist for the state's Centennial Chatauqua tour. The entourage of artists and performers visited small towns in Colorado, conducting workshops and theatrical performances. In each town, he composed a site-specific musical piece using recordings of local ambient sounds. Following the Chatauqua, Odland was hired by the Denver agency Artreach to teach music workshops for incarcerated juveniles. Meanwhile, he continued his sonic explorations, creating installations for art galleries. "Soundworks" was shown in 1979 at Sebastian-Moore Gallery in Denver, using found natural and urban objects to create instruments. "Any and all sound has potential to be a musical source", he said. In "Sonic Excavation", a performance at the Denver Art Museum (1979), Odland played pre-Columbian flutes, ocarinas, drums, interwoven with location recordings. "The flutes, actually museum artifacts, were transformed before us into living, breathing instruments."

In 1979, the Denver Center Theater Company created the position of Director of Sound and Music for Odland. He served that role from 1980 to 1984, creating musical scores and sound designs for more than 20 productions and developing new techniques for theater sound and speaker design. After leaving the DCTC, he continued working on theater pieces with the director Peter Sellars (1985–1987) at the Kennedy Center in Washington, D.C. and with Tina Packer's "Shakespeare & Company" in Lenox, Massachusetts (1980–1988).

In 1984, Odland was production manager for Laurie Anderson's "Mr. Heartbreak" tour of the United States and Japan. Also in 1984, he formed the Bruce Odland Big Band (BOBB), a 10-piece New Wave Big Band, featuring 5 jazz horns (including Ron Miles on trumpet), 2 rock drummers, bass, synth, and vocals that galvanized the Denver music scene for several years. The excitement generated was described by one columnist "like walking into a New York bar in the 1970s and hearing the Talking Heads". The band was voted Denver's best rock band in both 1985 and 1986. They recorded a single album, “Crossover” (XO Records). Ultimately, it proved too difficult to wrangle 10 musicians, all of whom played in multiple groups. Their last performance was in 1989.

=== Later career – 1990 to present ===
Odland moved to New York City in 1990 to be closer to Europe, where he had begun working extensively with sound artist Sam Auinger on O+A installations (see below). In the U.S., he continued to work in the theater, primarily in NYC with Joanne Akailitis, Andre Gregory, Wallace Shawn and Liz LaCompte's Wooster Group. From 1996 to 1998 he was composer-in-residence for IBM at the Thomas J. Watson Research Center in Yorktown, New York.

In 1998, Odland incorporated "30/70 Productions, Ltd.", to take on two large multi-media exhibit design/build commissions for millennium projects. "Sounds from Vaults" (1999–2000) was exhibited at the Field Museum, Chicago. Designed and built by 30/70 Productions in collaboration with the museum's exhibit design team, it brought ancient instruments back to life in an interactive exhibit. While viewing the untouchable artifacts behind glass cases, visitors were able to play digital samples of the instruments using touch pads and to create music with other visitors in real-time jam sessions. Acoustic chaos was averted by the ‘Babble Converter’, a behind-the-scenes computer program that synchronized the players’ rhythms. Touchscreen workstations let visitors explore the provenance and anthropology of the artifacts and play them as 'virtual instruments'. The exhibit was so popular that it was held over for four months and became a case study for best practices in exhibit design.

“Planet Earth Gallery" (opened 1999) was commissioned by the UK Millennium Commission for a sustainable development theme park called the Earth Center in Doncaster, England, which was built in a reclaimed coal mine. The exhibition was an interactive "Stonehenge-cosmological clock" with giant glass monoliths, sculptures, audio, video, solar refraction art installed in a cavernous gallery. People walking through the exhibit triggered an array of motion sensors that affected the A/V outputs, varying the visitor experiences. Although intended to be permanent, Planet Earth Gallery was dismantled when the Earth Centre failed to secure long-term funding and was closed in 2004.

During the 1990s, Odland began designing sonic installations for architectural spaces to acoustically define them as distinctive geographic places with their own history and to focus people on locating themselves and 'way finding' through their ears. StadTraum/City Dream (O+A, 1991 Salzburg Festival) was a multi-media performance piece combining sound, music, dance, light shows and fireworks. High Performance magazine described it: “A site-specific symphony of light and sound that explored the nature of presence, resonance and history as consciousness, CityDream succeeded in linking the past with the future in a holistic rather than linear form. The result was a visionary work that invoked and reasserted the spiritual power of art through sensual experience without compromising its political essence or meaning.” In Quiet is the New Loud (O+A, 2015), a piece for the Brugges Trienalle in Belgium, Odland and Auinger built balloon loudspeakers to accompany festival walkers through a map of "songlines", producing an echolocation readout that highlighted the Medieval architectural spaces. In 2015–16, for ESI Design, Odland created ambient information environment sonic designs for PNC Bank world headquarters in Pittsburgh, and for Beacon Capital Partners’ Terrell Building in Washington DC. A permanent O+A sound installation, Harmonic Gate, conceived and designed for Euroallee in Zurich, Switzerland opened in September 2020. Three "soundstone" loudspeakers play back city noise that has been transformed realtime into a sound field of harmony.

Odland's work increasingly explores creating realistic acoustic spatiality for surround sound and video. He and Auinger began experimenting with binaural microphones to make the 4-ears binaural recordings featured in their performance piece My Eyes...My Ears (2009–2015). He first experimented with music/sound design in virtual reality in the 2019 theatrical production of Hamlet 360 for Google and Commonwealth Theater. Later that year, he led the project team creating Detour 360 (2019) for the Fort Collins, Colorado Music District. "A 16-day musical journey through the diverse musical communities of Colorado, a small crew of sound and video experts explore the sonic landscape of the state with modern technologies as they spiral their way from Hartsel toward The Tank in Rangely, in the spirit of the forgotten Chautauqua Movement of the 19th and 20th Centuries". Documented in 360 VR and audio, with special premier at the OtterBox Digital Dome Theater, Museum of Discovery in Fort Collins, Colorado.

=== O+A hearing perspective ===
Odland met Sam Auinger while working on an installation, "Riverworks", at the 1987 Ars Electronic in Linz, Austria. They have collaborated since 1989 as the team O+A. Through their sonic explorations and installations they have evolved a "hearing perspective" in which the spatial environment is primarily perceived through hearing and decoding the cultural language of the place. They describe the evolution of their philosophy in a 2009 article in Leonardo Music Journal. They first discovered that urban environments could be 'tuned' while working on a 1991 installation "Secrets of the Sun" at Trajan's Forum, Rome. When they placed microphones inside large amphora jars onsite, the discordant city noises were converted into their resonant harmonies and when played back into the site had a noticeable calming effect on bickering workers. With "Harmonic Bridge", a permanent sound art piece at Mass MoCA (installed 1998), they built a resonant frequency ‘tuning tube’ to transform the sonic commons of a noisy underpass into a more humane entrance to the art center. "Hive Music" in New York City (1997) converted the urban sounds of the city's economic activity into a symphony. “Blue Moon” at the World Financial Center, NYC (2004) sensitized visitors’ ears to the sonic effects of the moon and tides on the busy harbor. The piece “transforms the ambient sound of the waterfront using tuning tubes that collect and filter the surrounding ambient noise, distilling it into harmonic tones that are modulated by the changing tides.” O+A's Requiem for Fossil Fuels, performed at Judson Memorial Church, NYC in 2007 and the World Financial Center, NYC, in 2010, was a site-specific Latin requiem combining human voices and ambient sound. It "combines a traditional memorial mass sung by a world class vocal quartet with the noises of fossil-fuel powered cars, helicopters, airplanes, horns and alarms".

=== The TANK Center for Sonic Arts ===
In 2013, Odland and a handful of musician friends embarked on a project to save an old steel water tank with cathedral-like acoustics and a 40-second reverb in Rangely, Colorado. Music critic Alex Ross describes it: "But it’s not a cathedral-style resonance, which dissipates in space as it travels. Instead, sound seems to hang in the air, at once diffused and enriched. The combination of a parabolic floor, a high concave roof, and cylindrical walls elicits a dense mass of overtones from even a footfall or a cough." Ever since locals abducted him to it on the 1976 Chatauqua tour, Odland and friends had made pilgrimages to visit the tank, crawling through a portal to play and record music. In 2013, however, the tank was in danger of being sold for scrap metal. With two successful Kickstarter campaigns and the help of Town officials and hundreds of supporters, the empty vessel was rescued and converted into an up-to-code performance space/assembly hall with a recording studio. Now officially the TANK Center for Sonic Arts, the venue attracts a wide range of musicians and choral groups and has garnered national attention. The TANK hosts musicians, concerts, recording projects, artistic residencies, workshops and other events. Odland serves as board president for the non-profit organization.

== Selected work ==
=== Multimedia installations and 360-film ===
- Detour 360: A Sonic Experiment (2019). Colorado Music District.
- Hamlet 360 (2018). Music and sound design, VR 360º version of Hamlet by Commonwealth Shakespeare Company. Artistic Director Steven Maler.
- Terrell Place, Washington, D.C. (2016). Interactive wall installations by experiential design firm ESI.
- Sounds from the Vaults, The Field Museum, Chicago. (1999–2000)
- Planet Earth Gallery, The Earth Center, Doncaster, UK. (1999) A Landmark Millennium Commission project.

=== Permanent sound installations ===
- Harmonic Gate, O+A (2020). Zurich, Switzerland. Conceived and designed for Europaallee.
- Hearing View, O+A (2013). Zurich, Switzerland. Art in Buildings for Psychiatric University Clinic, Rheinau Building 80.82
- Sonic Vista, O+A (2011). Frankfurt, Germany.
- The Green (2011). Novartis Campus, Basel, Switzerland. Co-designed with Laurie Anderson.
- Tonic, O+A (2002). West Hollywood, Los Angeles, California.
- Harmonic Bridge, O+A (1998). MassMoCA, North Adams, Massachusetts.

=== Temporary sound art installations ===
- Seven Bells for Stone Barns (2014–2017). Caramoor Center for Music and the Arts. 2014 Sound Art Exhibition "In the Garden of Sonic Delights". On the Rockefeller farm, Pocantico Hills, NY.
- Harmony in the Age of Noise (2008). Tufts University, Boston, Massachusetts.
- Blue Moon, O+A (2004). World Financial Center, New York, NY.
- Traffic Mantra, O+A (1991). Trajan's Forum, Rome, Italy. Part of "Secrets of the Sun" installation by solar artist Peter Erskine.
- Garden of Time Dreaming, O+A (1990). Linz, Austria.
- Riverworks (1980). Aspen Center for the Visual Arts, Aspen, Colorado.
- Sonic Excavation (1979). Denver Art Museum, Colorado.
- Soundworks (1979). Sebastian-Moore Gallery, Denver, Colorado.

=== Performance ===
- Requiem for the Extraction Economy, O+A (2017). Galerus Rotunda, Thessaloniki, Greece. For Documenta 14 Festival
- My Eyes...My Ears, O+A. Performed 2015 Boston, Massachusetts; 2011Lentos Kunstmuseum Linz, Austria; 2010 Concordia University, Montreal, Canada; 2009 Judson Memorial Church, New York, NY.
- Requiem for Fossil Fuels, O+A. 2010 World Financial Center, New York, NY; 2008 Sopienkirche, Berlin; 2007 St. Joseph's Cathedral, San Jose, California; 2007 Judson Memorial Church, New York, NY.
- StadTraum (City Dream), O+A (1991). Salzburg Festival, Austria.
- Bruce Odland Big Band (1984–1989). Denver, Colorado.

=== Film scores and sound design ===
- Andre Gregory: Before and After Dinner (2013). Original score. Documentary by Cindy Kleine.
- Everything Turns, Everything Revolves (2012). Original score. Documentary on the life of Hans Richter. Directed and produced by Dave Davidson, Hudson West Media.
- Sugar (2004). Director: Reynold Reynold. Sound design, film music, binaural recordings. Premiered at Sundance Film Festival, 2005.
- The Origin of Man (1998). Original score, independent feature film by Stewart Culpepper. Premiered at Taos Film Festival.
- Land of Little Rain (1989). Original score. Directed by Evelyn Purcell, starring Helen Hunt.
- Watunna (1989). Original music and sound design. Animation by Stacey Steers, narrated by Stan Brackage.

=== Theater music and sound design ===
- Bad News: I was There (2018). Directed by JoAnne Akalaitis. Guthrie Theater, Minneapolis.
- The Designated Mourner (by Wallace Shawn ) (2013). The Public Theater, new production, New York City (2000–2001): original music. Directed by Andre Gregory.
- Troilus and Cressida (2012–2014). Music and performance for Wooster Group/Royal Shakespeare production. London; World Shakespeare Festival, Stratford-on-Avon, UK; Disney Center, LA; Performing Garage, NYC.
- La Didone ( Francesco Cavalli/The Wooster Group) (2007 to 2009). Musical director and sound design. 2007: Kaii Theater, Brussels, Belgium; Rotterdamse Schouwburg, Rotterdam, Netherlands; Edinburgh International Festival, UK. 2008: St. Ann's Warehouse, Brooklyn, New York; Grand Théâtre de la Ville, Luxembourg. 2009: St. Ann's Warehouse, Brooklyn, New York; REDCAT, Los Angeles.
- Don't Trust Anyone over Thirty (2004–2006). Sound design for the Puppet Theater Rock Opera by Dan Graham and Tony Oursler with music by Japanther. Performed a Miami Art Basel and on a European tour.
- The Persians (by Æschylus) (1993). Director: Peter Sellars. Salzburg Festival, Szene Salzburg, Austria, Theater Bobigny, Paris, France; Mark Taper Forum, Los Angeles, California; International Festival, Edinburgh, UK; Hebbel Theater, Berlin, Germany.
- Shakespeare and Company (1980–1988): The Mount, Lenox, Massachusetts. Director: Tina Packer. Plays: Twelfth Night, A Comedy of Errors, Macbeth, A Midsummer Night's Dream, The Merry Wives of Windsor, As You Like It.
- The Denver Center for the Performing Arts (1980–1984): Director of Sound and Music for more than 20 plays and sound designs, including Wings, Medea, Under Milk Wood, The Tempest, Three Sisters, The Passing Game, An Enemy of the People.

=== Recordings and radio ===
- Grasses of A Thousand Colors (2021). Podcast of the play by Wallace Shawn. Sound design, music and podcast production. Gideon Media.
- Designated Mourner (2021). Podcast of the play by Wallace Shawn. Sound design, music and podcast production. Gideon Media.
- Party in the Bardo: Conversations with Laurie Anderson – Episode Two (2020 and 2021). A radio conversation about slowness between Anderson and Odland. Broadcast by Wesleyan University.
- Interior Design Innovation Podcast: Episode 2 (2018). Interior Design
- Requiem for Fossil Fuels. O+A (2007): CD, supported by DAAD, Berlin, Germany.
- The Designated Mourner. (2001): Radio broadcast of the play by Wallace Shawn, sound design, producer
- Resonance. O+A (1995): CD
- Leaving Eden (1993): CD, Arcadian Records
- Terra Infirma (1988–1991): Weekly radio show with Paul Klite for CPB, NPR. Winner of Golden Reel Award 1990.
- Crossover (1985): Bruce Odland Big Band, XO Records.

== Awards ==
- Silver Telly Award (2020): for Immersive Mixed Reality, Craft – use of 360 audio, Detour 360 – a sonic experiment.
- DAAD Artists-in-Berlin fellowship (2011–2012): Germany.
- Solo Artist, Composition Award (2009): NYSCA / Wooster Group.
- Gold Muse Award (2000): for Interactive Media, American Association of Museums, Sounds from the Vaults exhibition, Field Museum, Chicago.
- Helen Hayes Award (1997): Award in Sound Design, for Dance of Death, directed by Joanne Akalaitis.
- Golden Reel Award (1990): for the independent radio production Terra Infirma.
- Foundation for Contemporary Arts, Grants to Artists, Music/Sound (1990)
