= Dionysus in 69 =

1968 American play and 1970 documentary film

- Written by: The Performance Group
- Based on: The Bacchae by Euripides

Premiere
- Place: Performing Garage
- Directed by: Richard Schechner

Dionysus in 69 was a theatrical production directed and conceived by Richard Schechner, founder and longtime artistic director of the Performance Group (TPG), a New York-based experimental theater troupe. An adaptation of The Bacchae by Greek playwright Euripides, it was documented in a film by Brian de Palma, Bruce Joel Rubin, and Robert Fiore titled Dionysus in '69.

Dionysus in 69 was an example of Schechner's practice of environmental theater, utilizing space and the audience in such ways as to bring them in close contact with each other. Dionysus in 69 challenged notions of the orthodox theater by deconstructing Euripides' text, interpolating text and action devised by the performers, and involving the spectators in an active and sensory artistic experience. The film merged footage from the final two performances of the play in July 1969.

Dionysus in 69 won a 1969 Obie Award,. The script was published in 1970 by Noonday Press, with photographs of the production by Frederick Eberstadt.

== Cast ==
The cast of the play at the time of its filming was:

- Remi Barclay as Chorus/Herself
- Samuel Blazer as Coryphaeus/Chorus/Himself
- Jason Bosseau as Messenger/Chorus/Himself
- Richard Dia as Cadmus/Chorus/Himself
- William Finley as Dionysus/Chorus/Himself
- Joan MacIntosh as Agave/Chorus/Herself
- Vicki May as Chorus/Herself
- Patrick McDermott as Tiresias/Chorus/Himself
- Margaret Ryan as Chorus/Herself
- Will Shepherd as Pentheus/Chorus/Himself
- Ciel Smith as Agave/Chorus/Herself

== Source material ==
The Bacchae opened the City Dionysia Festival in Athens in 405 BC and won first prize. The action follows the god Dionysus on his return to the city of Thebes to avenge his mother's reputation and the god's own rejection as the bastard child of Zeus. The title refers to the groups of devoted female followers of the god, who serve as the chorus in the play, and would engage in ecstatic rituals to the point of euphoric delirium motivated by the god's association with wine, sexuality, celebration, and the theater. The play deals with the themes of religion, sexuality, sacrifice and devotion. The translation which served as the basis for the TPG production was written by William Arrowsmith.

== Project details ==
Rehearsal and performance took place in a "performing garage" (actually a small metal stamping factory). According to Schechner, the group rehearsed an average of 6 hours a day, at least 6 days a week, for 5 months. The rehearsal included vocal training and psychophysical interactions (e.g. attack therapy, a controversial method at that time in use to treat drug addicts).

Dionysus in 69 is an example of Richard Schechner's theories of environmental theater in terms of the uses of the performing space, deconstruction of classic texts, and audience participation. In his book, Schechner describes participation as the opening up of a play so that the audience/spectators can enter into the action—they are included in the world of the drama which is made all the more actual by their participation. As Schechner describes in his 1973 book Environmental Theater: "The transformation of an aesthetic event into a social event—or shifting the focus from art-and-illusion to the formation of a potential or actual solidarity among everyone in the theater, performers and spectators alike." There were no seats, though the cast would chant "May I take you to your seat, sir?" The audience sat either on the floor, against a wall, or wooden scaffolds. Dionysus in 69 created an atmosphere in which participation ranged from clapping and singing to spectators stripping and joining in the ritual celebrations and dances.

After working on Dionysus in 69, Schechner composed three rules regarding participation:

1. The audience is in a living space and a living situation. Things may happen to and with them as well as "in front" of them.
2. When a performer invites participation, he must be prepared to accept and deal with the spectator's reactions.
3. Participation should not be gratuitous.

Schechner also notes that the key to participation is that it fundamentally changes the nature of the performance, its rhythms and outcomes. He states that, "Without this potential for change participation is just one more ornamental, illusionistic device."

Previous to Dionysus in 69, Schechner practiced and theorized "Six Axioms for Environmental Theater". These axioms were enacted in this play, as well as in other of Schechner's theater pieces:

1. The theatrical event is a set of related transactions
2. All the space is used for performance; all the space is used for audience.
3. The theatrical event can take place either in a totally transformed space or in found space.
4. Focus is flexible and variable.
5. All production elements speak in their own language.
6. The text need be neither the starting point nor the goal of a production. There may be no text at all.

== Critical reception and influence ==
Dionysus in 69 was widely considered to be Schechner's seminal work. It is often looked to as the piece that broke ground on the movement of happenings in American theater and performance art. Jill Dolan, of Princeton University, says of Schechner's work on Dionysus: "Schechner [made environmental staging] famous, in which the audience is interspersed with the actors, in a way that refuses the conventional separation between spectators and performers." The production also gained something of a cult following, with audiences who returned to see (or participate in) the show again and again. This was so much the case that when, during a performance in which the audience held a revolt of sorts and several students "rescued" the actor playing Pentheus, removing him from the performance over the objections of other cast members. Schechner then asked the audience for a volunteer to replace the actor playing Pentheus in order to complete the performance, and a spectator who had been many times before and was familiar with the piece volunteered to fill in the role. Although wrought with controversy, The New York Times called Dionysus in 69 "a production of extraordinary grace and power".

== Film ==
Dionysus in '69
- Film poster
- Directed by: Brian De Palma; Robert Fiore; Bruce Rubin
- Written by: William Arrowsmith; Euripides
- Starring: William Finley
- Cinematography: Robert Fiore; Bruce Rubin; Brian De Palma
- Edited by: Bruce Rubin; Brian De Palma; Robert Fiore
- Color process: Black and white
- Distributed by: Sigma III
- Release date: 1970
- Running time: 85 minutes
- Country: United States
- Language: English

Dionysus in '69 is a 1970 American film directed by Brian De Palma, Robert Fiore and Bruce Rubin that documents the theatrical performance. It was entered into the 20th Berlin International Film Festival.

=== Production ===
The film merges the final two performances of the play, from June and July 1969, the final one having been staged with more lighting, for better recording quality. In contrast to the previous non-recorded performances, actors are not fully naked during central scenes so as to ensure distribution to movie theaters. The film makes use of split screen to show both actors and audience involvement in parallel.

=== Home media ===
Dionysus in '69 was included by Radiance Films as an extra on their Ultra HD Blu-ray release of De Palma’s other 1970 film Hi, Mom! that was released on May 19, 2026.
