= Chris Baldwin (director) =

British theatre director, professor and writer

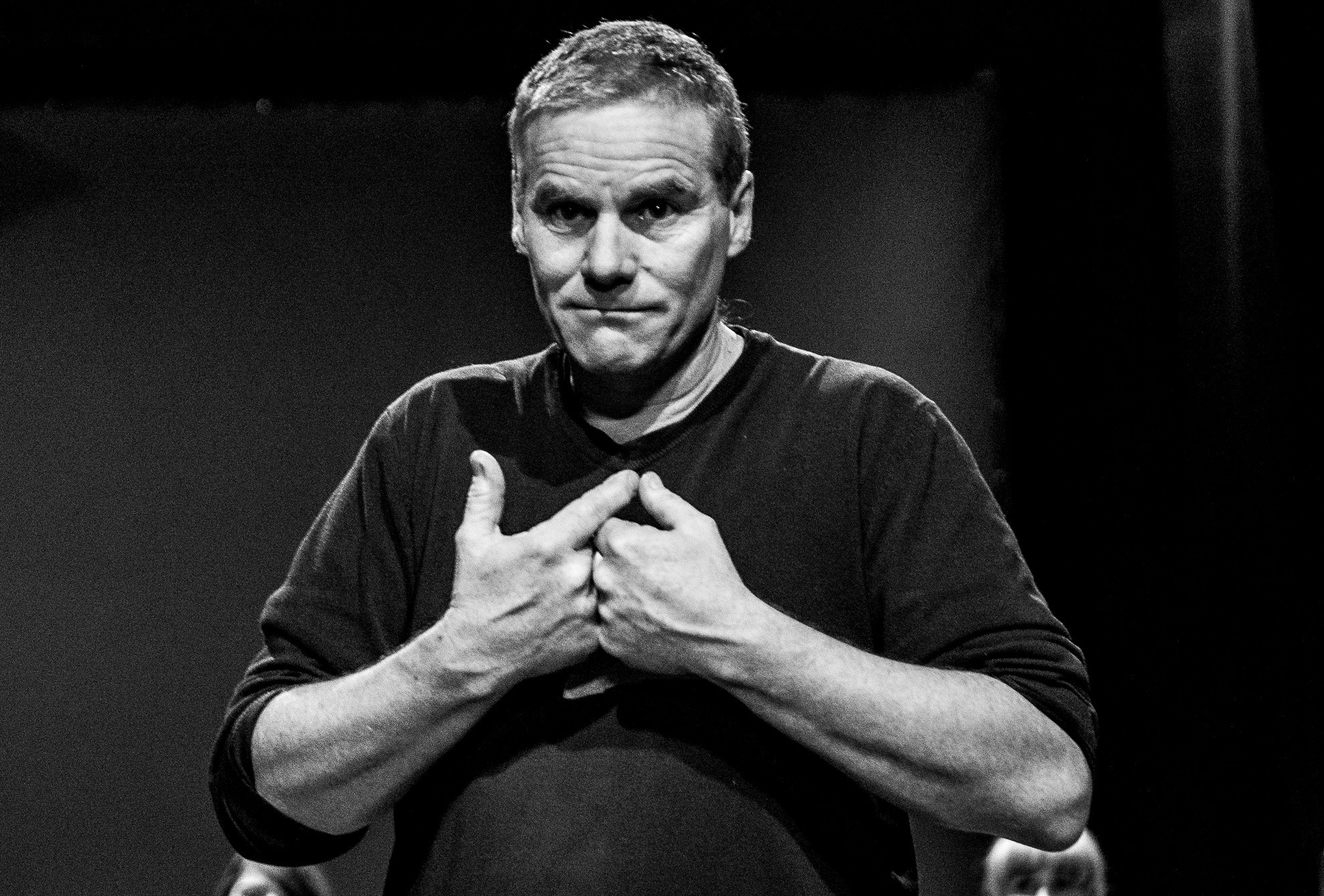
Chris Baldwin

Chris Baldwin is a British performance director and curator, professor and writer, he has lived in northern Spain for 20 years. He develops site specific performances and curated events devoted to specific city, rural or regional contexts. Baldwin's work emphasises the importance of a collaboration between professionals and citizens in the making and curating of cultural projects. He has various plays and Books published about theatre and the teaching of history in post authoritarian countries. Baldwin directs widely including Spain, UK, Poland, Bulgaria and Germany. Baldwin worked for Rose Bruford College, 2012 Summer Olympics. He was Curator of Interdisciplinary Performance for the 2016 European Capital of Culture in Wroclaw, Poland and also works for the Universidad de Santander. He was Creative Director for Galway 2020 European Capital of Culture., the Director of the Contemporary Myth of Kaunas Trilogy for Kaunas European Capital of Culture 2022 and is the director of the Opening Ceremony Mystery 0, Mysteries of Transition of European Capital of Culture, Greece - 2023Eleusis

== Major productions (2006–2023) ==
- 2022/2023 Director Opening Ceremony 2023 Eleusis - European Capital of Culture 2023
- 2020/2022 Artistic director Grand events Kaunas European Capital of Culture 2022
- 2019/2020 Director Pageant of the seas - Il Mappa - Valletta, Malta
- 2017/18 Creative director for Galway 2020 European Capital of Culture.
- 2015/16 The Flow Quartet – Wroclaw, European Capital of Culture, 2016.
  - Four performance projects which when combined tell the story of Wroclaw to itself, Poland, Europe and beyond. The Flow Quartet consists of four interlinked projects:
1. Bridges – Mosty – 20 June 2015,
2. Spirits of Wroclaw (Opening Ceremony) – 17 January 2016,
3. Flow I and II – 11 June 2016, and
4. Niebo (Closing Ceremony) – 16/17 December 2016
- 2012 "Raise the Sky" – Written and directed by Chris Baldwin, Music by Nick Bicat – London Olympic's Torch Ceremony – Worcester 2012
- 2011 "The Way the Winds Blow" – Written and directed by Chris Baldwin, Music by Nick Bicat – Rutland Water June
- 2010 "El tren que nunca fue..." (The Train that never was...) Calera y Chozas, Toledo, Spain
- 2009 "Mapping Bulgaria" – North-West Bulgaria 2009 A regional programme of cultural interventions with young people and history teachers focusing upon arts, social trama and historical memory.
- 2008 "The Devil's Tale" – Stourport Basins (British Waterways), UK
- 2007 "Epos" – A three-year project of performance research, cultural animation, symposium and festival concluding in a major performance and festival at Contrebia Leukade, La Rioja, Spain
- 2007 "Sorgiñak" – A 3-year performance collaboration between artists and local people in rural Aláva, La Rioja, Spain.
- 2006 "Suko" – Performance and Design transformation of interior and exterior of Teruel Museum by artists and children (Spain)

== Publications ==
- Baldwin C, Pinocho (Play Text) Editorial: ÑAQUE ISBN 8489987351 Date:2001
- Baldwin, C Cosima'Play Text) Editorial: ÑAQUE ISBN 8492084456 Date: 1998
- Baldwin C, Bicat, T. (2002) Teatro de Creación Editorial: Ñaque ISBN 8489987505
- Baldwin C, Bicat, T. (2002) Devised and Collaborative Theatre Editorial: Crowood ISBN 1861265247
- Baldwin C, (2003) Stage Directing (Editorial: Crowood ISBN 1861266030)
- Baldwin C (2010) 1989, Mapping the North West of Bulgaria – Applied Theatre and the Teaching of Disputed Histories (Editorial: New Culture Foundation, Bulgaria ISBN 978 954 698 0113)

== Press ==
- The Soul of the City – Chris Baldwin interviewed by Catherine Trzeciak 12 July 2015 "The City is a story, but it also can be the author of the story. The diverse and multi-layered nature of the city is a story that demands to be told."
- Fiesta in Breslau – Chris Baldwin interviewed by Magda Piekarska 5 December 2015
- ¨Caos, Dirreción y Amor¨ Chris Baldwin por Bienvenida Borrás 24/04/06
