= Strong Medicine (film) =

- Directed by: Richard Foreman
- Written by: Richard Foreman
- Produced by: Jordan Bojilov; Eric Franck; Mary Milton; Simon Nuchtern
- Starring: Bill Raymond; Ron Vawter
- Cinematography: Babette Mangolte
- Edited by: Richard Foreman; Karen Stern; Victor Zimet
- Music by: Stanley Silverman
- Release date: November 25, 1981 (New York City)
- Running time: 84 minutes
- Country: United States
- Language: English

Strong Medicine is a 1981 American drama film written and directed by Richard Foreman and starring Kate Manheim, Scotty Snyder, Bill Raymond, Harry Roskolenko and Ron Vawter.

== Premise ==
Adaptation of an avant-garde play, also by Foreman, about Rhoda (Kate Manheim), a hysterical heroine who feels oppressed by the people around her. She suffers through her birthday party. She then goes to see a doctor, plans a vacation. She argues a lot and even breaks the fourth wall.

== Cast ==
- Kate Manheim as Rhoda
- David Warrilow as Doctor
- Ron Vawter as Max
- Bill Raymond as Young Man
- Harry Roskolenko as Old Man
- Scotty Snyder as Old Woman
- Ruth Maleczech as Eleanor
- Carol Kane
- Raul Julia as Raoul
- Buck Henry
- Wallace Shawn as Birthday Party Guest (uncredited)

== Reception ==
Leonard Maltin awarded the film two and a half stars.
