= The Cabinet of Dr. Ramirez =

1991 film by Peter Sellars

- Directed by: Peter Sellars
- Written by: Peter Sellars
- Story by: Mikhail Baryshnikov; Joan Cusack; Peter Gallagher; Ron Vawter
- Produced by: Charles S. Carroll
- Starring: Mikhail Baryshnikov; Joan Cusack; Peter Gallagher
- Cinematography: David Watkin
- Edited by: Robert Estrin
- Music by: John Adams
- Release date: May 14, 1991 (Cannes)
- Running time: 95 minutes
- Countries: United Kingdom; France; Germany; United States

The Cabinet of Dr. Ramirez is a 1991 modern silent film directed by Peter Sellars and starring Mikhail Baryshnikov, Joan Cusack and Peter Gallagher. It is a loose remake of The Cabinet of Dr. Caligari. However, the storyline was created as the film was being made, so it has few similarities with the original film. The film was screened only at the 1992 Sundance Film Festival and never theatrically released. David Lynch served as an executive producer.

== Cast ==
- Mikhail Baryshnikov as Cesar
- Joan Cusack as Cathy
- Peter Gallagher as Matt
- Ron Vawter as Dr. Ramirez
- Kate Valk as Sue
- Werner Klemperer as Fat Man Looking for a Tax Break
- Paul Eckstein and Peter Francis James as Janitors
- Lola Pashalinski and Paul Butler as Narcs
- Merlin Santana as Newsboy
- Mark Morris as Mine
- Harsh Nayyar as Beaver Gourmet
