= Off-off-Broadway =

Small-scale theatre in New York City

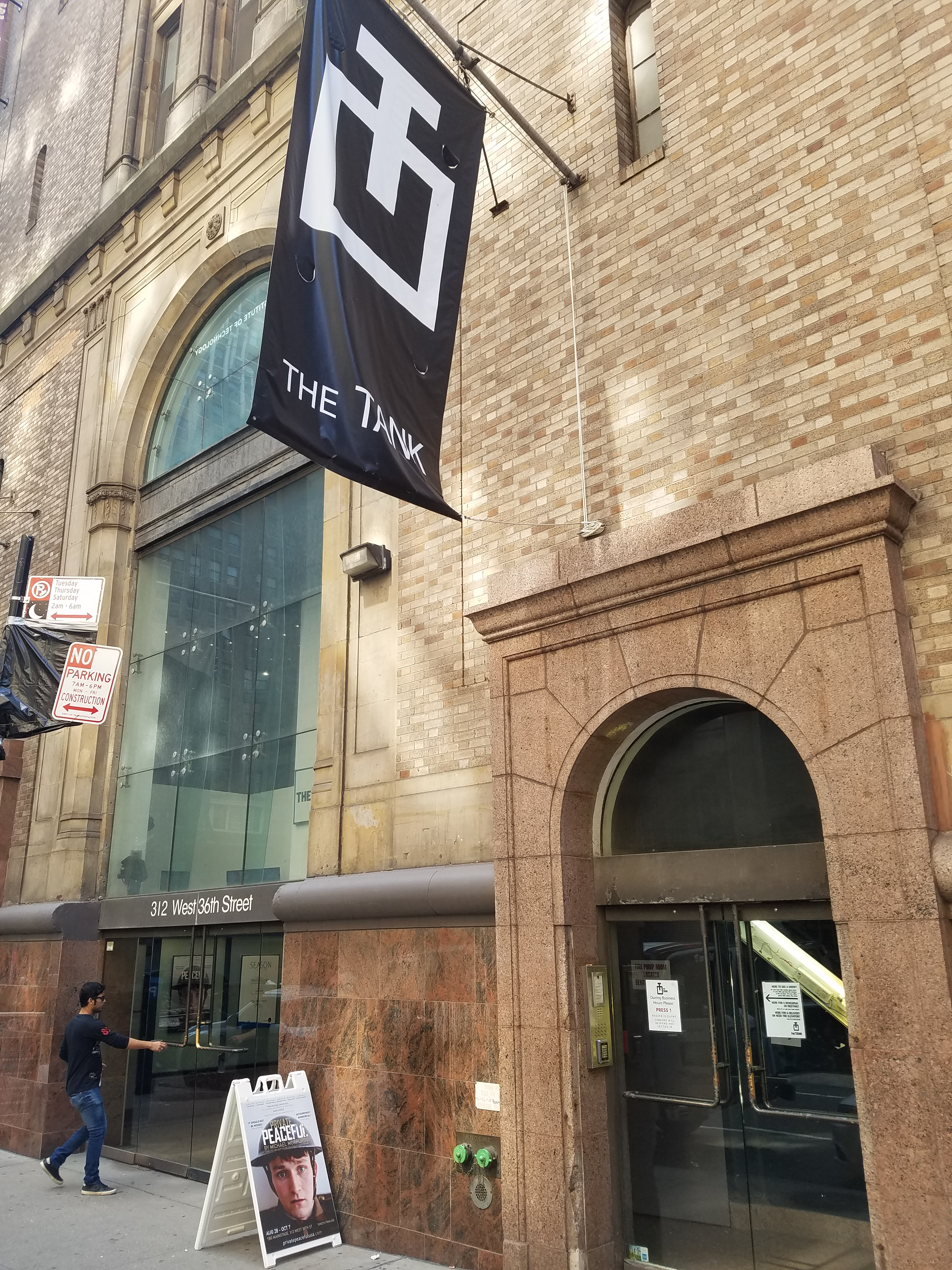
The Tank, an off-off-Broadway theater in Midtown Manhattan

Off-off-Broadway theaters are smaller New York City theaters than Broadway and off-Broadway theaters, and usually have fewer than 100 seats. The off-off-Broadway movement began in 1958 as part of a response to perceived commercialism of the professional theatre scene and as an experimental or avant-garde movement of drama and theatre. Over time, some off-off-Broadway productions have moved away from the movement's early experimental spirit.

== History ==
The off-off-Broadway movement began in 1958 as a "complete rejection of commercial theatre". Michael Smith gives credit for the term's coinage to Jerry Tallmer in 1960. Among the first venues for what would soon be called "off-off-Broadway" theatre were coffeehouses in Greenwich Village, particularly the Caffe Cino at 31 Cornelia Street, operated by the eccentric Joe Cino, who early on took a liking to actors and playwrights and agreed to let them stage plays there without bothering to read the plays first, or to even find out much about the content. This DIY aesthetic also led to creative acts of object repurposing by playwrights and directors, who cobbled together sets from materials scavenged from local streets. Also integral to the rise of off-off-Broadway were Ellen Stewart at La MaMa, and Al Carmines at Judson Poets Theatre, located at Judson Memorial Church. Other theaters of note that presented many plays were Theatre Genesis, New York Theatre Ensemble, The Old Reliable, The Dove Company, The Playwrights Workshop, and Workshop of the Players Art.

At its coalescence, off-off-Broadway was known for its experimental nature. Brooks McNamara wrote that over time, off-off-Broadway work lost some of its experimental spirit, instead beginning to imitate the "characteristics of off-Broadway, which had gradually moved toward reshaping itself in the image of Broadway, though often producing works that were unsuitable for commercial theatre."

An off-off-Broadway production that features members of the Actors' Equity Association may be an Equity Showcase production intended to allow actors to be seen by potential future employers. Equity maintains union rules about working in such productions, including restrictions on the price of tickets, the length of the run, and rehearsal times. Professional actors' participation in showcase productions is frequent and comprises the bulk of stage work for the majority of New York actors. There has been an ongoing movement to revise the Equity Showcase Code, which many in the community find overly restrictive and detrimental to the creation of New York theatre.

In 1964, off-off-Broadway productions were made eligible for Obie Awards. In 1974, the Drama Desk Awards began evaluating such productions with the same criteria used for Broadway and off-Broadway productions. Since 2005, the New York Innovative Theatre Awards (NYIT Awards or IT Awards) have annually honored individuals and organizations that have achieved artistic excellence in off-off-Broadway theatre.

The term indie theatre, or independent theatre, was suggested as an alternative for "off-off-Broadway" by playwright Kirk Bromley during a speech at the 2005 New York Innovative Theatre Awards.

== See also ==
- Broadway theatre
- Off-Broadway

== Sources ==
- Bottoms, Stephen J (2004), Playing Underground: A Critical History of the 1960s Off-Off-Broadway Movement, Ann Arbor: University of Michigan Press, ISBN 0-472-03194-5.
- Curley, Mallory (2013), Tales of Off Off Broadway, Randy Press.
- Malewitz, Raymond (2014). The Practice of Misuse: Rugged Consumerism in Contemporary American Culture. Palo Alto, CA: Stanford University Press. doi:10.11126/stanford/9780804791960.001.0001. ISBN 9780804791960.
- Viagas, Robert (2004), The Back Stage Guide to Broadway, New York: Back Stage, ISBN 0-8230-8809-X.
