= Brooks McNamara =

American academic

Brooks Barry McNamara (1937–2009) was an American theater historian, professor, and contributing editor of The Drama Review.

== Life ==
McNamara was born in Peoria, Illinois. Upon graduation from Knox College, he pursued a Master of Arts degree at the University of Iowa. Following military service, McNamara earned his PhD in theater arts at Tulane University where Richard Schechner was a professor and editor of the Tulane Drama Review (TDR). After earning his PhD, McNamara taught theater history in the Drama Department at the University of Delaware, between 1966 and 1968. At Tulane, Schechner had crystallized a set of principles to describe environmental theater. McNamara illustrated many of them in his set design for his Delaware academic colleague, William Bruehl's production of Faustus.

Meanwhile, Schechner and TDR, renamed "The Drama Review," relocated in 1967 to NYU where he became a professor in the Graduate Drama Department. In the fall of 1968, McNamara also became a professor at NYU's Graduate Drama Department. In 1969, Schechner directed "Makbeth," a version of Shakespeare's "Macbeth." For this production, McNamara designed "The Makbeth Maze." The two, along theatre designer Jerry Rojo, co-authored "Theatres, Spaces, Environments: Eighteen Projects" (1975).

McNamara was instrumental in the transformation of that NYU Department into the Performance Studies Department, which was officially launched in 1981. He founded the archives of Shubert Theatre in 1976 and served as director for 20 years. McNamara's research, writing, and curatorial pursuits resulted in numerous publications, exhibitions, productions, and archival collections. His life work spans the areas of theatre history, popular entertainments, public celebrations, and New York performance history. After retiring in 1996, McNamara remained professor emeritus of performance studies and director emeritus of the Shubert Archive.

In later life, McNamara was diagnosed with sporadic cerebellar ataxia. He died in Doylestown, Pennsylvania, of pneumonia on 8 May 2009.

== Books ==
- The New York Concert Saloon: the Devil's Own Nights. Cambridge: Cambridge University Press, 2002.
- Gower Champion Dance and American Musical Theatre. With David Payne-Carter and Stephen Nelson. Westport, Conn.: Greenwood Press, 1999.
- Day of Jubilee: The Great Age Of Public Celebrations In New York, 1788-1909: Illustrated From The Collections Of The Museum Of The City Of New York. New Brunswick, N.J.: Rutgers University Press, 1997.
- Inside the Minstrel Mask: Readings In Nineteenth-Century Blackface Minstrelsy. Edited with Annemarie Bean and James V. Hatch. Hanover, NH: Wesleyan University Press, 1996.
- The Merry Muldoons and the Brighteyes Affair. New York: Orchard Books, 1992.
- The Shuberts of Broadway: A History Drawn From The Collections Of The Shubert Archive. With the Shubert Archive. New York: Oxford University Press, 1990.
- Edwin Booth's Legacy: Treasures From The Hampden-Booth Theatre Collection At The Players. Selected and organized by Raymond Wemmlinger and Brooks McNamara; catalogue by Raymond Wemmlinger and Brooks McNamara; with contributions by Robert A. Carter, José Ferrer and Paul Myers. [New York]: Hampden-Booth Theatre Library, 1989.
- Plays from The Contemporary American Theater. New York: New American Library, 1988.
- The Drama Review: Thirty Years of Commentary on The Avant-Garde. Edited by Brooks McNamara and Jill Dolan. Ann Arbor, Mich.: UMI Research Press, c1986.
- American Popular Entertainments: Jokes, Monologues, Bits, and Sketches. [1st Ed.] New York City: Performing Arts Journal Publications, 1983.
- Step right up. [1st ed.] Garden City, N.Y., Doubleday, 1976.
- Theatres, Spaces, Environments: Eighteen Projects. Co-authored with Jerry Rojo and Richard Schechner. New York: Drama Book Specialists, 1975.
- The American Playhouse in the Eighteenth Century. Cambridge, Mass.: Harvard University Press, 1969
