= Elizabeth LeCompte =

American director of theater, dance and media in NYC, US (born 1944)

- Born: April 28, 1944 (age 82); New Jersey, U.S.
- Occupation: Director
- Partner: Willem Dafoe (1977–2004)
- Children: 1

Elizabeth LeCompte (born April 28, 1944) is an American director of experimental theater, dance, and media. A founding member of The Wooster Group, she has directed that ensemble since its emergence in the late 1970s. She has been associated with other troupes as well, including The Performance Group and University theatre programs.

Throughout her career she received a number of awards, including a the MacArthur Fellowship, the Chevalier des Arts et des Lettres from the French Cultural Ministry, a Guggenheim Fellowship, and a Rockefeller Foundation Fellowship.

== Life and career ==
LeCompte was born and grew up in New Jersey. She earned a Bachelor of Science degree in Fine Arts from Skidmore College. She met director and actor Willem Dafoe at The Performance Group and began a professional and personal relationship. Their son, Jack, was born in 1982.

With The Wooster Group, she has composed, designed, and directed over forty works for theater, dance, film and video, starting with Sakonnet Point in 1975. These works characteristically interweave performance with multimedia technologies and are strongly influenced by historical and contemporary visual arts and architecture. She is known both for taking apart and reworking classics such as Hamlet, The Emperor Jones, and The Hairy Ape as well as constructing new works from scratch.

Prior to her work with The Wooster Group, she was a member of the experimental theater company The Performance Group from 1970 to 1975. Subsequently, LeCompte and Spalding Gray founded The Wooster Group, along with Jim Clayburgh, Willem Dafoe, Peyton Smith, Kate Valk, and Ron Vawter. For her work with these groups, LeCompte was included in Mitter and Shevtsova's 2004 volume discussing 50 influential theater directors around the world. Other writers consistently include her in the lineage of experimental theater artists that passes through Meyerhold and Grotowski to the present generation of "postdramatic" theater makers. As a New Yorker writer put it: "Luminaries of the theatrical avant-garde—Richard Foreman, Robert Wilson, and Peter Sellars among them—describe her as first among equals".

LeCompte has lectured and taught at American University, the Art Institute of Chicago, Columbia University, Connecticut College, the Lincoln Center Theatre Directors Lab, Massachusetts Institute of Technology, New York University, Northeastern University, the O’Neill Center, Smith College, the University of London, and the Yale School of Drama. In 2018, The New York Times critics ranked House/Lights the 16th greatest American play since Angels in America.

== Awards ==
Among her honors, LeCompte has received the National Endowment for the Arts Distinguished Artists Fellowship for Lifetime Achievement in the American Theater, the MacArthur Fellowship, the Chevalier des Arts et des Lettres from the French Cultural Ministry, a Guggenheim Fellowship, a Rockefeller Foundation Fellowship, a United States Artists Fellowship, an Anonymous Was A Woman Award, the Theater Practitioner Award from Theatre Communications Group, The Skowhegan Medal for Performance, a Doris Duke Charitable Foundation Performance Artist Award and honorary doctorates from the New School for Social Research and the California Institute of the Arts. She was included in the 1993 Whitney Biennial. She won the 2016 Dorothy and Lillian Gish Prize.

== Wooster Group works made by LeCompte ==
=== Theater ===
==== Three Places in Rhode Island ====
- Sakonnet Point (1975)
- Rumstick Road (1977)
- Nayatt School (1978)
- Point Judith (an epilog) (1979)

==== The Road to Immortality ====
- Route 1 & 9 (1981)
- L.S.D. (…Just the High Points…) (1984)
- Frank Dell’s The Temptation of St. Antony (1988)
- North Atlantic (1984, 1999, 2010)
- Brace Up! (1991, 2003)
- The Emperor Jones (1993, 2006)
- Fish Story (1994)
- The Hairy Ape (1996)
- House/Lights (1998, 2005)
- To You, The Birdie! (Phèdre) (2002)
- Poor Theater (2004)
- Who’s Your Dada?! (2006)
- Hamlet (2007, 2012)
- La Didone (2009)
- Vieux Carré (2011)
- Troilus and Cressida (2012) — a collaboration with the Royal Shakespeare Company; directed by Elizabeth LeCompte and Mark Ravenhill
- Cry, Trojans! (Troilus & Cressida) (2014)
- Early Shaker Spirituals (2014)
- The Room (2016)
- The Town Hall Affair (2017)
- A Pink Chair (In Place of a Fake Antique) (2018)
- Nayatt School Redux (2019)
- The Mother (2021)
- Symphony of Rats (2024)

=== Dance ===
- Hula (1981)
- For the Good Times (1982)
- Dances with T.V. and Mic (1998)
- Erase-E(X) (2004) (with JoJi Inc.)
- I Am Jerome Bel (2008)

=== Film and video ===
- Flaubert Dreams of Travel but the Illness of His Mother Prevents It (1986)
- Today I Must Sincerely Congratulate You (1991)
- White Homeland Commando (1992)
- Rhyme ’Em to Death (1994)
- The Emperor Jones (DVD - 1999)
- House/Lights (DVD - 2004)
- There Is Still Time . . Brother (installation - 2007)
- Brace Up! (DVD - 2009)
- Dailies (2010 - present)
- To You, The Birdie! (Phèdre) (DVD - 2011)
- Rumstick Road (DVD - 2013)

=== Radio-audio ===
- The Emperor Jones (BBC Radio 3 play - 1998)
- Racine’s Phèdre (BBC Radio 3 play - 2000)

== Personal life ==
In 1977 LeCompte began a relationship with actor Willem Dafoe. They never married and ended their relationship in 2004 after 27 years. The couple has one son: Jack.

== See also ==
- The Performance Group
- The Wooster Group
