= Richard Schechner =

American academic and theater director (born 1934)

- Born: August 23, 1934 (age 92); Newark, New Jersey, U.S.
- Education: Cornell University (BA); University of Iowa (MA); Tulane University (PhD)

Richard Schechner is an American academic and theater director. He founded the New York City experimental theater company The Performance Group and is a pioneer of the field of performance studies. He is University Professor Emeritus at the Tisch School of the Arts, New York University, and editor of TDR: The Drama Review.

== Biography ==
Richard Schechner was born and raised in Newark, New Jersey. He received his Bachelor of Arts degree from Cornell University in 1956, a Master's degree from the University of Iowa two years later, and a PhD from Tulane University in 1962. He edited The Drama Review, formerly the Tulane Drama Review, from 1962 to 1969; and again from 1986 to the present.

Schechner went on to become one of the founders of the Performance Studies department of the Tisch School of the Arts, New York University. He founded The Performance Group of New York in 1967, which he led as artistic director until 1980, when it transformed into The Wooster Group. The home of both is the Performing Garage in New York's SoHo district, a building acquired by Schechner in 1968. That year Schechner signed the "Writers and Editors War Tax Protest" pledge, vowing to refuse tax payments in protest against the Vietnam War. In 1992, Schechner founded East Coast Artists with whom he continues to work. He writes books and also articles for journals worldwide.

In the 1990s, Schechner originated "rasaboxes," a technique of emotional training for performers and others.

In his seminal 1993 work The Future of Ritual, Schechner explores how human belief, artistic expression, and cultural belonging converge in human societies to express authenticity and foster identity. Noting that the term avant-garde no longer serves its original purpose, he goes on to analyze theater and ritual in guerilla street theater and ritualized aspects of cultural experimentation in an international context.

Beginning in 2007, the Richard Schechner Center for Performance Studies at the Shanghai Theatre Academy began publishing the bi-annual TDR/China.

== Published works ==
=== Books ===
- Public Domain (1968)
- Environmental Theater (1973)
- Theatres, Spaces, and Environments (1975 with Jerry Rojo and Brooks McNamara)
- Essays on Performance Theory (1976)
- The End of Humanism (1981)
- From the Ramlila to the Avantgarde (1983)
- Between Theater and Anthropology (1985)
- The Engleburt Stories (1987, with Samuel MacIntosh Schechner)
- The Future of Ritual (1993)
- Performance Theory (revised edition of Essays on Performance Theory, 1988; revised again, 2004)
- Performance Studies—An Introduction (2002, second edition 2006, third edition 2013, fourth edition 2020)
- Over, Under, and Around (2004)
- Performed Imaginaries (2015)

=== Edited works ===
- Dionysus in '69 (1970 film of 1968 production)
- Ritual, Play, and Performance (1976, with Mady Schuman)
- By Means of Performance (1990, with Willa Appel)
- The Grotowski Sourcebook (1997, with Lisa Wolford).

== Theatrical/directorial works ==
In March 2005, the Richard Schechner Center for Performance Studies was inaugurated as part of the Shanghai Theatre Academy, where Schechner is an Honorary Professor. With The Performance Group Schechner directed many productions including Dionysus in 69 based on Euripides' The Bacchae (1968), Makbeth based on Shakespeare's Macbeth (1969), Commune group devised piece (1970), Sam Shepard's The Tooth of Crime (1972), Bertolt Brecht's Mother Courage and Her Children (1975), David Gaard's The Marilyn Project (1975), Seneca's Oedipus (1977), Terry Curtis Fox's Cops (1978), and Jean Genet's The Balcony (1979). With East Coast Artists, Schechner has directed Faust/gastronome (1993), Anton Chekhov's Three Sisters (1995), William Shakespeare's Hamlet (1999), and Schechner's and Saviana Stanescu's YokastaS (2003, YokastaS Redux 2005), Lian Amaris's Swimming to Spalding (2009), Imagining O (three versions: 2011, 2012, 2014). Schechner has also directed in Asia and Africa: Anton Chekhov's Cherry ka Baghicha (1983 in Hindi) in New Delhi, Sun Huizhu's Mingri Jiuyao Chu Shan (1989 in Shanghai in Mandarin) August Wilson's Ma Rainey's Black Bottom (1992) at the Grahamstown Festival, South Africa, Aeschylus's The Oresteia (1995 in Taipei in Mandarin), and Shakespeare's Hamlet (2007 in Shanghai and 2009 in Wroclaw, Poland, in Mandarin).

While in New Orleans from 1960 to 1967, Schechner was a producing director with John O'Neal and Gilbert Moses of the Free Southern Theater (1963–65) and a founding director with Franklin Adams and Paul Epstein of the New Orleans Group (1964–67). Schechner was instrumental in identifying many exceptional writers, including Sam Shepard, Jean-Claude VanItallie, Murray Mednick, Ronald Tavel and Canadian-trained Megan Terry, whose techniques he compared to Shakespeare. He described Terry's "Viet Rock" as "Elizabethan in scope and tone." Plays, Schechner maintained, should be "wrought" rather than "written" - and he implied that Shakespeare "wrought" large at the turn of the seventeenth century by working closely with London's burgeoning theatrical companies. Schechner sought to emulate this technique in the late sixties with his Performance Group.

Schechner is currently editor of the Enactments series published by Seagull Books and editor of the Worlds of Performance series published by Routledge.
