= The Wooster Group =

Experimental theater company, NY, NY, US (since 1975)

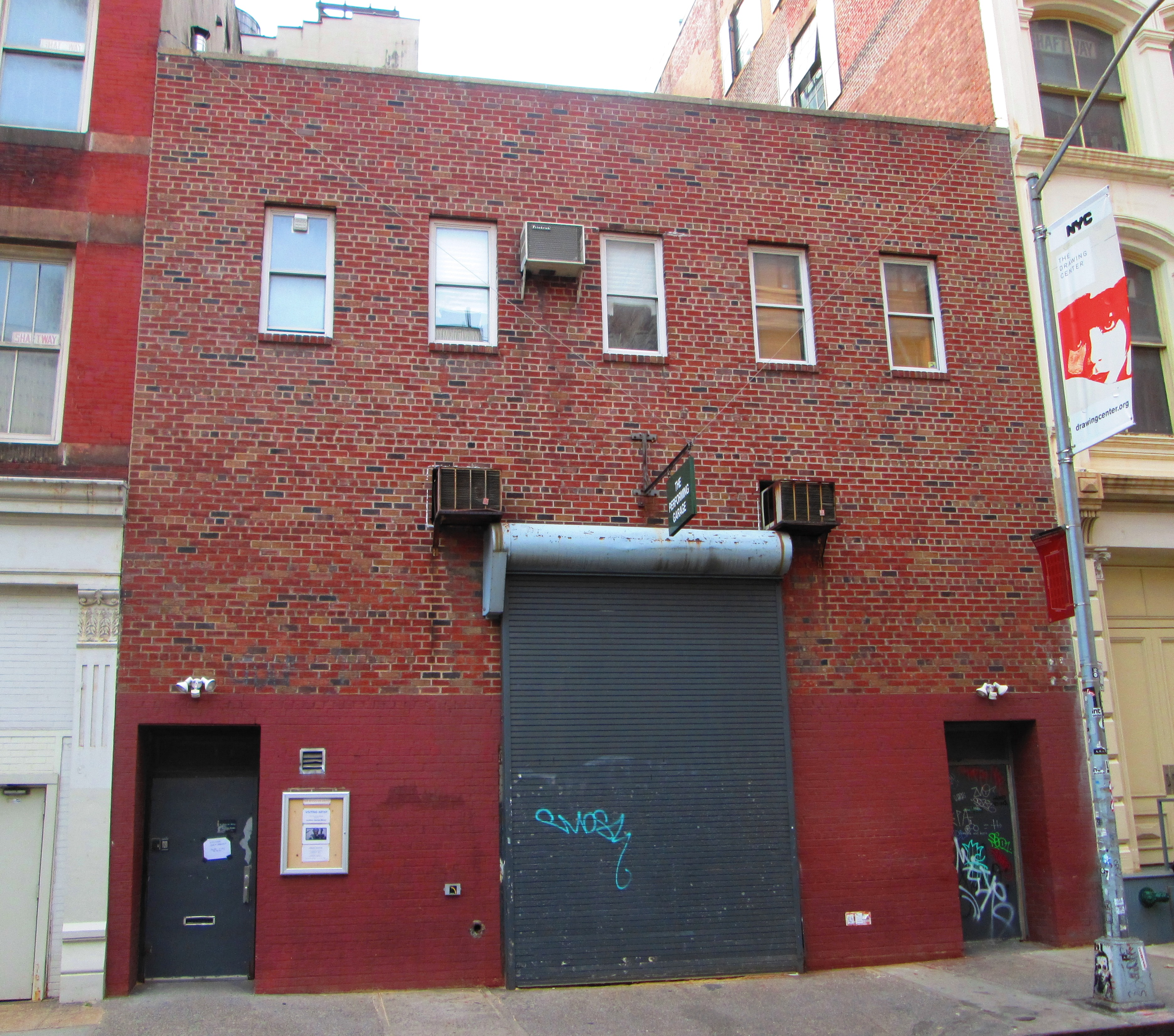
- The Performing Garage in 2014
- Formation: 1975
- Type: Theatre group
- Location: New York City, New York, United States
- Artistic director: Elizabeth LeCompte
- Website: thewoostergroup.org

The Wooster Group is an experimental theater company based in New York City known for creating numerous original dramatic works. It gradually emerged from Richard Schechner's The Performance Group (1967–1980) during the period from 1975 to 1980. The group took its name in 1980; the independent productions of 1975–1980 are retroactively attributed to the group.

The ensemble is directed by Elizabeth LeCompte and it launched the careers of many actors including founding member Willem Dafoe. The group's home is the Performing Garage at 33 Wooster Street between Grand and Broome Streets in the SoHo neighborhood of Manhattan. As of 2014, the company consists of 16 members. In addition, there are 29 "Associates".

The Wooster Group is a not-for-profit theater company that relies on grants and donations from supporters. It has received multiple grants from the Carnegie Corporation. The group is characterized by its extremely experimental style, often incorporating aspects of audiovisual such as interactive video art, live stream, recorded sound, and pre-recorded video into their performance work. Their performances are often of classic texts like Brecht, Shakespeare, Chekhov, and Eugene O'Neill.

Past collaborators with the group include Ken Kobland, Jim Strahs, Richard Foreman, Trisha Brown, John Lurie, Bruce Odland, Jennifer Tipton, Frances McDormand, Hans Peter Kuhn, and Amir ElSaffar among others.

== Founding members ==
- Elizabeth LeCompte
- Jim Clayburgh
- Kate Valk
- Peyton Smith
- Ron Vawter (d. 1994)
- Spalding Gray (d. 2004)
- Willem Dafoe

== Current company ==
- Andrew Maillet
- Alexandre Artaud
- Ari Fliakos
- Aaron Amodt
- Clay Hapaz
- Cynthia Hedstrom
- Elizabeth LeCompte
- Eric Sluyter
- Jonathan Hull
- Kate Valk
- Michaela Murphy
- Matthias Neckermann
- Mike Farry
- Monika Wunderer
- Scott Shepherd
- Tavish Miller
- Yudam Hyung Seok Jeon

== Awards and honors ==
The Wooster Group has won nine Obie Awards, six Bessie Awards, and the 1985 National Endowment for the Arts Ongoing Ensembles Grant.
