= The Performance Group =

Experimental theatre company in New York

- Formation: 1967
- Founder: Richard Schechner
- Dissolved: 1980
- Type: experimental theater company
- Location(s): Performing Garage; New York City

The Performance Group (TPG) was an experimental theater troupe that Richard Schechner founded in 1967 in New York City. TPG's home base was the Performing Garage in the SoHo district of Lower Manhattan. Known for their use of environmental theater, their 1968 production, Dionysus in 69 won an Obie Award. Tensions led to Schechner's resignation in 1980. The troupe reinvented itself as The Wooster Group under the leadership of director and theatre artist Elizabeth LeCompte.

== History ==
TPG was an "environmental theatre" – meaning that each production took place in an entirely redesigned space. Most of TPG's productions were directed by Schechner, though others including Joan MacIntosh, Stephen Borst, James Griffiths, Leeny Sack, Elizabeth LeCompte, and Spalding Gray either directed their own works or works by others. TPG's designers included Jerry Rojo, Michael Kirby, and Jim Clayburgh. Some of TPG's productions were collages of various texts, other productions were radical deconstructions of classics, and some works were brand new. Schechner resigned as artistic director in 1980. At that time, Elizabeth LeCompte became the artistic director of the company which was renamed The Wooster Group and continued to operate out of the Performing Garage.

== Productions ==
Many TPG works premiered and then were modified over several years. TPG's major works are (unless otherwise noted, productions were directed by Schechner):

- Dionysus in 69 (1968), based on Euripides' The Bacchae, text by Schechner based on group improvisations
- Makbeth (1969), (based on Shakespeare), text devised by Schechner
- Commune (1970), a group devised work with the text arranged by Schechner and the company, which won Joan MacIntosh an OBIE for Distinguished Performance in 1970
- The Tooth of Crime (1972) by Sam Shepard
- Mother Courage and Her Children (1975) by Bertolt Brecht
- The Marilyn Project (1975), by David Gaard)
- Oedipus (1977) by Seneca
- Cops (1978) by Terry Curtis Fox; The Survivor and the Translator (1978) performed and directed by Leeny Sack
- The Balcony (1979) by Jean Genet

In 1975, some members began to develop their own productions, led by Spalding Gray and Elizabeth LeCompte. The trilogy (Three Places in Rhode Island) was performed in the Performing Garage but was not attributed to TPG. Performances include Sakonnet Point (1975), Rumstick Road (1978), Nyatt School (1978), and Point Judith (an epilogue) (1979). Eventually this divide led to the change in organization that created The Wooster Group.
