= Stanley Silverman =

American musician (born 1938)

Stanley Joel Silverman
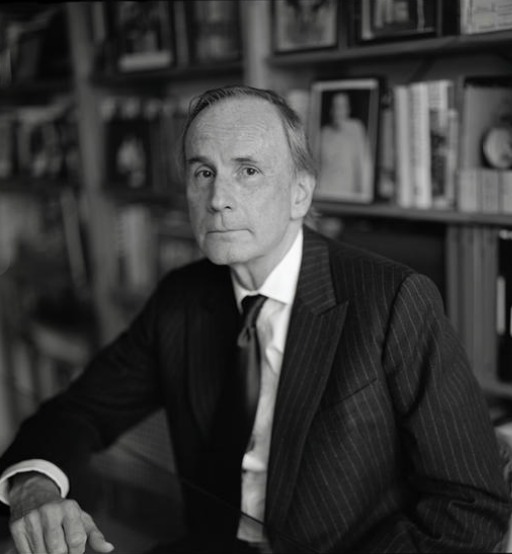
- Stanley Silverman at home
- Born: Stanley Silverman; July 5, 1938 (age 88); New York City
- Education: Mills College (MA), Boston University (BMus), Columbia University, High School of Performing Arts
- Occupations: Composer, arranger, conductor, guitarist
- Years active: 1958–present
- Spouse(s): Mary Delson (m. 1966–1975) Martha Caplin (m. 1980–1995)
- Children: Ben Silverman, Rena Silverman
- Parent(s): Meyer Silverman, Eva Silverman (nee) Kass
- Website: stanleysilverman.com

Stanley Silverman (born July 5, 1938, in New York City) is an American composer, arranger, conductor and guitarist.

Silverman's diverse career covers music theatre, film, television, classical and pop music. His work has featured on stages across the world including on and off-Broadway and his collaborators include Richard Foreman, Anthony Burgess and Arthur Miller. He has also worked with renowned directors Mike Nichols and Arthur Penn. Silverman worked with Paul Simon on his musical The Capeman in 1998 for which his orchestrations were nominated for Tony and Drama Desk Awards. His music has been performed by Pierre Boulez, Michael Tilson Thomas, Tashi, the Kalichstein-Laredo-Robinson Trio and pop icons James Taylor and Sting.

Across a successful career as a conductor, Silverman worked on the Tony, Drama Desk and Grammy Award nominated 1976 Joseph Papp production of The Threepenny Opera which starred in the lead role Raul Julia.

== Early life ==
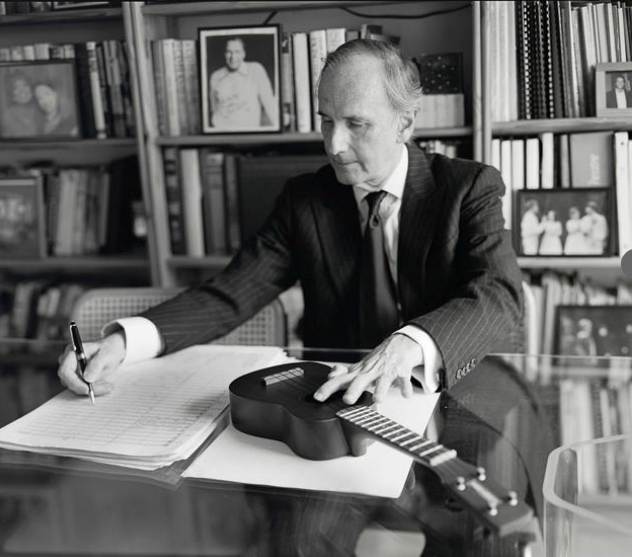
Stanley Silverman composing at home in New York

Stanley Silverman was born in New York City and is the son of Russian Jewish immigrants. Silverman grew up in the Bronx attending public school followed by the High School of Performing Arts before completing his BMus at Boston University and his MA in Music Composition at Mills College.

At Tanglewood Silverman studied with Leon Kirchner and at Mills College with Kirchner and Darius Milhaud. Silverman's Tenso: Afternoon Music For Orchestra, composed for a White House concert premiered in 1962 for President John F. Kennedy.

As a young man Silverman played guitar in a western swing band and developed an interest in jazz music which took him to the Brussels World Fair playing with his college jazz quintet.

Upon graduating Silverman became a regular concert guitarist and worked with the New York Philharmonic, the Boston Symphony Orchestra and The Chamber Music Society of Lincoln Center. Silverman also played guitar at the Malboro Festival, the Ojai Festival and during this period worked with Leonard Bernstein, Pierre Boulez, Lukas Foss and Gunther Schuller. As a young guitarist Silverman specialized in new music performing and recording many premieres.

Following work as guitarist, Silverman concentrated on his career as a composer and was part of Charles Wuorinen's New York composer-performer group, The Group for Contemporary Music.

== Career ==
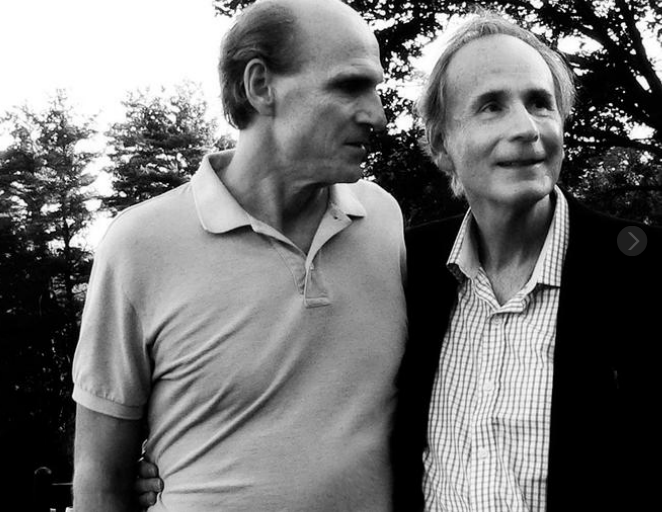
Stanley Silverman with James Taylor

Silverman taught at Tanglewood during the 1960s and in 1965 was appointed music director of The Lincoln Center Repertory Theater before joining Canada's Stratford Festival at the invitation of Glenn Gould. He worked at the Stratford Shakespeare Festival extensively from 1967 when he composed music for John Hirsch's production of Richard III until 1994. His career at the Festival was celebrated in a one-off concert in 2013 called Celebrating Stanley which covered the diverse range of material he had composed over almost three decades for the Festival. In 1971 Silverman, along with Lyn Austin and Oliver Smith, was a founding member of the Lenox Arts Center, later the Music Theatre Group.

Amongst a range of noteworthy collaborations, Silverman composed the incidental music for Arthur Miller's 1972 Broadway production of The Creation of the World and Other Business and worked with the playwright again on his only musical Up from Paradise which premiered at Miller's alma mater, the University of Michigan in Ann Arbor in 1973. A recent production took place under the direction of Patrick Kennedy at the New Wimbledon Theatre, London in 2014.

In 1976, Silverman joined Joseph Papp's production of The Threepenny Opera as musical director. The show premiered at the Vivian Beaumont Theater under the direction of Richard Foreman. Of Silverman's musical direction, Alan Rich of New York Magazine said, "This is strong, intelligent music-making, and it clarifies, more than any version I have heard live or on records, the stature of this dazzling score." The production received critical acclaim and went on to earn Tony, Drama Desk and Grammy Award nominations.

During the 1980s, Silverman enjoyed a brief and successful directing career including an Obie award winning production of the Virgil Thomson and Gertrude Stein opera, The Mother of Us All in 1983. He also conceived and directed the 1986 music-theater piece Black Sea Follies at Playwrights Horizons

Aside from his involvement with theatre, Silverman has worked with several musicians as an arranger including a Grammy award-winning collaboration with James Taylor on Hourglass.

In recent years, Silverman has been a specialist consultant for Reveille TV, Electus Studios and NBC music Specials.

Silverman was honored by the Lincoln Center Institute for the Arts in Education in 2004, having served for over thirty years as one of its founding board members.

=== Recent activity ===
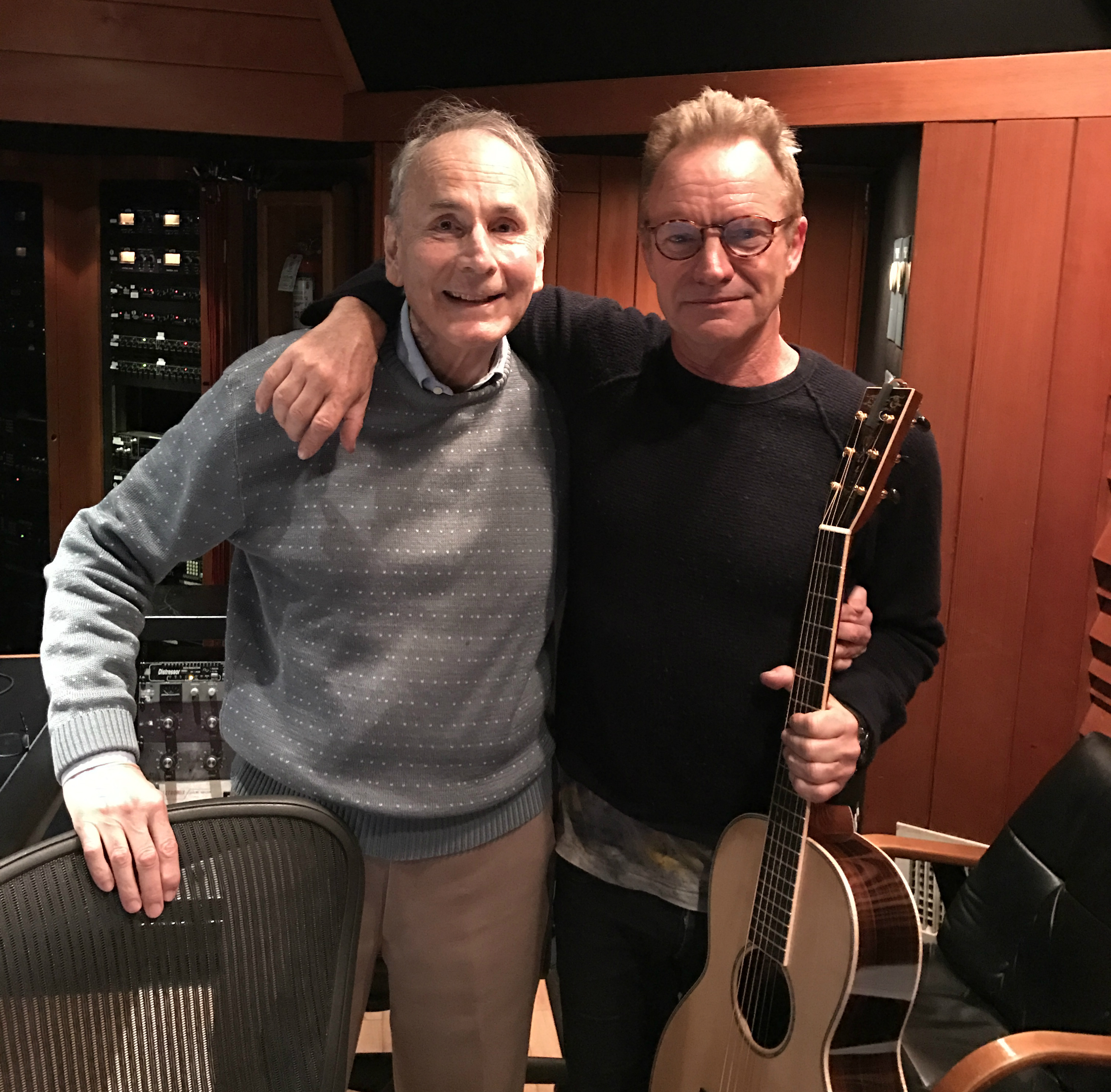
Silverman with Sting

Hotel For Criminals by Richard Foreman and Stanley Silverman had its UK premiere in October 2016 at the New Wimbledon Studio directed by Patrick Kennedy. The show garnered positive reviews from critics, including British Theatre's Critics Choice 2016, in particular for Silverman's score:

"The music is immensely more tuneful and memorable than the great majority of scores currently to be heard in the commercial scene."

"The score is filled with rich vocal harmonies and elegant melodies dappled amongst chromatic recitative and horror film discordance."

"Silverman's score is a rich combination of haunting, discordant phrases and sumptuous melodies that reflect the other-worldliness of the narrative."

"Stanley Silverman's score is beautiful, enigmatic and embraces the show's disjointed narrative with its smooth and impressive melodies."

On 26 February 2017 BBC Radio 3 broadcast Anthony Burgess's Oedipus the King with Silverman's score. It was rebroadcast on 19 May 2019.

On January 12, Sting recorded the vocals for Fear No More composed by Silverman performed by the Kalichstein-Laredo-Robinson trio.

=== Collaborations with Richard Foreman ===
In 1968 Silverman began collaborating with playwright/director Richard Foreman resulting in several works of music-theatre. Their first collaboration was Elephant Steps which premiered at Tanglewood in 1968 with the New York Magazine calling it "The best piece of new music I've heard in concert all year." and the LA Times saying there had been "Nothing like it before or since." A musical recording of the same name was released on LP by Columbia Records in 1974. "A mere Chuck Berry expert cannot judge the quality of the 'classical' music herein contained, although he can mention that he does not intend to investigate it further", wrote rock critic Robert Christgau in Christgau's Record Guide: Rock Albums of the Seventies (1981). "The 'rock,' however, was apparently concocted by David Clayton-Thomas's heir covert and the pit band from the Oslo production of Hair. And any English major can see through the 'libretto.'"

Other collaborations include Dream Tantras For Western Massachusetts, Hotel For Criminals, Madame Adare, The American Imagination, Africanus Instructus, Love & Science and Dr Selavy's Magic Theatre which led to the New York Times describing Silverman as "the brightest talent in this medium to come along since Leonard Bernstein... he could turn out to be the later day Cole Porter."

=== Influences ===
Silverman has been influenced by the works of Baroque composers Handel, Henry Purcell, Austrian expressionist Arnold Schoenberg, French guitarist Django Reinhardt, songwriters Rodgers and Hart, and Cuban charanga.

=== 80th birthday celebrations ===
To celebrate Silverman's 80th birthday on July 5, several concerts and productions are being staged around the world in 2018/9.

- 4–5 July 2018 – Tanglewood Festival, Lenox, Massachusetts

Private birthday celebration hosted by James Taylor and Kim Taylor

- 23 July 2018 – Stratford Shakespeare Festival, Stratford, Ontario, Canada

Songs from Up From Paradise, Book & Lyrics by Arthur Miller

- 20–22 August 2018 – Grimeborn Festival, Arcola Theatre, London, UK

Elephant Steps (opera), Libretto by Richard Foreman. 50th anniversary production directed by Patrick Kennedy

- 10 September 2018 - Belo Horizonte, Brazil

Six Saudades do Brasil for String Quartet (Premiere) Guignard Quartet

- 25 October 2018 - Wallis Annenberg Center for the Performing Arts, Los Angeles

American Friends of the Israel Philharmonic Orchestra to Honor Stanley Silverman. The Israel Philharmonic will perform a program including works composed by Stanley Silverman.

- Late 2019 – ALBUM, In Celebration, Trio No.1 – The Piano Trios of Stanley Silverman

The Kalichstein-Laredo-Robinson Trio with Guest Artist Sting

In Celebration, Trio No. 1 is included on Chamber Music America's list of 100 best chamber pieces written by an American.

- 2018-2019 – Kalichstein-Laredo-Robinson Trio tour

Trio No. 2 “Reveille”

== Personal life ==
In 1966, Silverman married former VP of BBC America and theatre and television producer and executive Mary Silverman (née Delson); the couple had one child, Ben, chairman and co-CEO of Propagate and former NBC co-chairman. With Mary, Silverman also raised artist and illustrator Sarah Delson. In 1980 Silverman married Martha Caplin, a founding member and 1st Violin, Primavera Quartet and the Orpheus Chamber Orchestra. The couple has one child, Rena, a journalist and photography writer.

== Theatre ==
=== Music theatre ===
Elephant Steps

- 1968: Tanglewood
- 1970: Hunter Playhouse, New York & Lake George Opera
- 2018: Arcola Theatre, London

The Satyricon

- 1969: Stratford Festival, Canada

Dream Tantras for Western Massachusetts

- 1971: Commemorating the opening of the Lenox Arts Center, Lenox, Massachusetts

Dr. Selavy's Magic Theatre

- 1972: Lenox Arts Center
- 1972-73: Mercer Arts Center, New York
- 1973: Wisdom Bridge Theatre, Chicago
- 1978: Oxford Playhouse, England
- 1985: New York Off-Broadway Revival (Music Theatre Group)
- 2014: New Wimbledon Theatre, England

Hotel for Criminals

- 1974: Lenox Arts Center
- 1975: Westbeth Theatre, New York
- 1977: Berkeley Repertory Theatre, California
- 1977: Lyon Opera, FR
- 2009: Provincetown Playhouse
- 2016: New Wimbledon Theatre, England

The American Imagination

- 1978: Music Theatre Group, New York

Madame Adare

- 1980: New York City Opera, Lincoln Center

The Columbine String Quartet Tonight

- 1981: Music Theatre Group, Off Broadway
- 1981: Wolf Trap Theatre

Up from Paradise

- 1977: Kennedy Center
- 1981: Whitney Museum
- 1982: Off-Broadway
- 1987: Great Lakes Shakespeare Festival
- 2014: New Wimbledon Theatre, England
- 2018: Stratford Festival, Canada

Africanus Instructus

- 1986: Music Theatre Group, New York
- 1986: Festival d'Automne, Centre Pompidou, Paris
- 1986: Festival de Otono, Teatro Monumental, Madrid
- 1986: Festival de Lille, l'Opera

A Good Life

- 1986: Kennedy Center, Washington DC

Paradise for the Worried

- 1989: Lenox Arts Center, Massachusetts
- 1990: Music Theatre Group, New York

Love and Science

- 1990: Music Theatre Group, Lenox, Mass.
- 1991: Music Theatre Group, New York
- 1993: Houston Grand Opera, Houston

Celebrating Stanley (Revue)

- 2013: Stratford Shakespeare Festival, Ontario, Canada

Celebrating Silverman (Revue)

- 2014: London Hippodrome, London

=== Incidental music ===
Broadway

- 1969: The Watering Place
- 1972: The Creation of the World and Other Business
- 1978: Stages
- 1980: Bent (Nominated - Drama Desk Award)
- 1981: The Little Foxes
- 1982: Othello
- 1983: Private Lives
- 1992: Saint Joan (National Actors Theatre)
- 1993: Timon of Athens (Nominated - Drama Desk Award)
- 1994: The Government Inspector
- 1995: Uncle Vanya

Off-Broadway

- 1958: The Golden Six
- 1962: Ten Nights in a Barroom
- 1983: The Lady and the Clarinet
- 2007: Fugue

Repertory Theater of Lincoln Center

- 1965 The Country Wife
- 1966 Yerma
- 1967: The Little Foxes & Galileo
- 1968: St. Joan & Tiger at the Gates
- 1970: Beggar on Horseback
- 1971: Mary Stuart
- 1972: Narrow Road to the Deep North

Stratford Festival, Canada

- 1967: Richard III
- 1968: Midsummer Night's Dream
- 1969: Satyricon
- 1970: School for Scandal
- 1981: A Comedy of Errors
- 1982: The Tempest, Arms and the Man & Mary Stuart
- 1983: Love's Labour's Lost & Much Ado About Nothing
- 1985: King Lear
- 1989: The Merchant of Venice
- 1991: Timon of Athens
- 1992: The Tempest & Measure for Measure
- 1994: Twelfth Night & 2 One-Act Plays by Moliere

Guthrie Theatre. Minneapolis

- 1971: Taming of the Shrew
- 1972: Oedipus
- 1973: School for Scandal

New York Shakespeare Festival

- 1979: Julius Caesar & Coriolanus
- 1984: The Golem
- 1994: The Merry Wives of Windsor

Mark Taper Forum. Los Angeles

- 1979: The Tempest

Long Wharf Theatre. New Haven

- 1982: Two by A.M. (Arthur Miller)
- 1983: The Lady and the Clarinet

Royal Exchange Theatre. Manchester, England

- 1987: The Bluebird of Unhappiness

Seattle Repertory Theatre

- 1987: The Caucasian Chalk Circle

Hartford Stage Company

- 1992: Heartbreak House

Lincoln Center Theatre. New York

- 1998: Ah, Wilderness!

Royal Shakespeare Company

- 1999: Timon of Athens (adaptation)

The Berkshire Theatre Festival

- 1966: The Skin of Our Teeth
- 1966: The Cretan Women
- 1966: The Merchant of Venice

== Classical compositions ==
=== Principal performances ===
Tenso

- 1962: White House & Carnegie Hall
- 1963: Broadcast, Brazil Television and Japanese Television

Canso

- 1964: Tanglewood (de Varon)
- 1965: Town Hall, New York

Planh

- 1966: Festival de Musique Americaine Contemporaine, Radio diffusion Television Francaise, Paris
- 1968: Monday Evening Concerts, Los Angeles; Tanglewood
- 1969: Stratford Festival, Canada
- 1971: New York Philharmonic Encounter Series (Pierre Boulez)

The Midsummer Night's Dream Show

- 1971: New England Conservatory Chorus, Jordan Hall, Boston
- 1973: Speculum Musicae, Burgess, Gagnon, Whitney Museum, NY

Oedipus The King (Oratorio)

- 1973: Speculum Musicae, Burgess, Gagnon at the Whitney Museum, NY
- 2016: BBC Orchestra and Chorus, BBC Radio 3

Crepuscule

- 1974: Chamber Music Society of Lincoln Center
- 1984: Chamber Music Society of Lincoln Center
- 1987: Y Chamber Soloists, New York (Jaime Laredo)
- 2004: Chamber Music Society of Lincoln Center

The Charleston Concerto

- 1976: U.S Bicentennial performances in Charleston and New York

Variations on a Theme of Kurt Weill

- 1977: Naumburg Award. Performed by Empire Brass Quintet at Tully Hall, Lincoln Center (American Tour 1977–1984)
- 1978: Brooklyn Philharmonic at the Brooklyn Academy of Music
- 1982:Empire Brass Quintet at Sanders Theatre, Harvard University
- 1995: Meridian Brass Quintet (International Tour & Recording)
- 2018: Israel Philharmonic at the Wallis Annenberg Center, Los Angeles

New York Shakespeare Festival Fanfare

- 1978: Delacorte Theatre, New York

Chaconne in D minor (Arranged for Brass Quintet)

- 1982: Empire Brass Quintet at Sanders Theatre, Harvard University

Birthday Variations for Avery Fisher

- 1986: Avery Fisher Hall, Lincoln Center

Trio No. 1 In Celebration

- 1989: Performed by Kalichstein-Laredo-Robinson Trio at the 92nd Street Y, New York and Krannert Center, Urbana Illinois. (International Tour, 1990–95, American Tour 2000–present).
- 2001: Ouro Preto & Pocos de Caldas, Brazil, (Musitrio)
- 2007: Bronfman Chamber Series, Sun Valley, ID
- 2008: Rio & Porto Alegre, Brazil, (Musitrio), Gewurzmuehle Zug, Switzerland (Ensemble Chameleon)
- 2013: Maestro Sergio Magnani Hall, Belo Horizonte, Brazil (Musitrio)

Psalm 100

- 1990: Fairmount Temple, Cleveland, Ohio

Khlestakov's Lullaby

- 1994: Dayton Philharmonic, Dayton, Ohio

Eridos

- 1999: European Cultural Centre of Delphi, Greece (Antigoni Goni)
- 2000: Concertgebouw, Amsterdam,
- 2001: Royal Academy of Music, London (Antigoni Goni); Carnegie Recital Hall, New York (Antigoni Goni)
- 2001: Prague, Czech Republic, (Antigoni, Goni)

Shakespeare and Our Planet

- 2001: Lincoln Center Institute (2 concerts & tour)
- 2002: (Gala) Walter Reade Theater, Lincoln Center

Trio No.2 Reveille

- 2011: Performed by Kalichstein-Laredo-Robinson Trio with Sting at the 92nd St. Y, New York
- 2013: Kalichstein-Laredo-Robinson Trio, Kennedy Center, Washington DC (& U.S. tour)
- 2013: Ensemble Chameleon. Grosse Halle Gewurzmuhle, Zug, Switzerland. Saal Hofmat, Oberagi, Switzerland
- 2018: Kalichstein-Laredo-Robinson Trio, Da Camera Society, Los Angeles

Saudades do Brazil for String Quartet (after Milhaud)

- 2020: Quartet Guignard, Sala Sergio Magnani, Belo Horizonte, Brazil

== Principal performances as guitarist ==
- 1961: Ojai Festival, California
- 1962: Los Angeles Philharmonic
- 1962-69: Tanglewood
- 1962-63: Pierre Boulez Tour
- 1965, 1966, 1967: Marlborough Festival
- 1966, 1967: Boston Symphony Orchestra
- 1966-72: New York Philharmonic
- 1966: Stravinsky Festival, Lincoln Center
- 1966: Festival de Musique Americaine Contemporaine, Paris
- 1971, 1974, 1978, 1981, 1984, 1985: Chamber Music Society of Lincoln Center
- 1987, 1993: Chamber Music at the Y, New York

== Filmography ==
=== Composer ===
- Great Performances (1 episode) (1975)
- Nanook of the North (1976)
- Simon (1980)
- Eyewitness (1981)
- Strong Medicine (1981)
- I'm Dancing as Fast as I Can (1982)
- The Tempest (TV Movie) (1983)
- Behind The Scenes with David Hockney (1992)

=== Consultant ===
- Charles Munch Final Concert with the Boston Symphony, WGBH (1962)
- Nashville Star, NBC, USA Network (2003-2008)
- Michael Buble's Christmas in New York (with Justin Bieber), NBC (2011)
- Casanova, Amazon Studios (2015)
- Israel Philharmonic Global Gala (hosted by Helen Mirren), Livestream on Israel Philharmonic Orchestra website (2020)

== Discography ==
=== Composer ===
- Doctor Selavy's Magic Theatre (1974, 2011)
- Elephant Steps (1974, 2013)
- New American Music Vol. 2. Planh (1975, 2004)
- Sweet Airs That Give Delight, Shakespeare songs (1992)
- Legacies: Piano Trios by Zwilich, Pärt, Kirchner & Silverman (1996)
- Age of Influence, Variations on a Theme of Kurt Weill (1996)
- Kinematic, In Celebration (2002)
- Hymn to the Muse, Eridos (2016)
- Michael Tilson Thomas The Complete Columbia, Sony and RCA Recordings, Elephant Steps (2024)

=== Guitarist ===
Selected credits include:

- Mahler Symphony No. 7 (Leonard Bernstein, 1967)
- Footlifters (Gunther Schuller 1975, 2005)
- Threepenny Opera, guitar, banjo, Hawaiian guitar (1976, 2010)
- Marlboro Music Festival 40th Anniversary (1984, 1990)
- Brasileirinho (Paula Robison, 1993)

=== Arranger ===
Major arranger credits include:

- Songs From The Capeman, Paul Simon (1997)
- Hourglass, Another Day, Enough To Be On Your Way James Taylor (1997)
- You're the One, Darling Lorraine, The Teacher, Paul Simon (2000)

=== Conductor ===
- Threepenny Opera LP (1976) CD (2004)
- Timon of Athens, Duke Ellington (1993)

== Awards ==
- 1970 - Obie Award for Outstanding Achievement, Elephant Steps
- 1973 - Drama Desk Award for Most Promising Composer, Dr. Selavy's Magic Theatre
- 1977 – Grammy Award nomination for Best Opera Recording, Threepenny Opera
- 1979 - Drama Desk Award nomination for Outstanding Incidental Music, Bent
- 1983 - Obie Award (Special Citation) for The Mother Of Us All
- 1993 - Grammy Award nomination for Best Classical Performance Soloist, Concerto
- 1997 – Grammy Award winner for Best Pop Album, Hourglass
- 2000 - Grammy Award nomination as arranger for Album of the Year, You're The One
- 2018 – Zubin Mehta Lifetime Achievement Award
