= Richard Foreman =

American dramatist (1937–2025)

- Richard Foreman of The Ontological-Hysteric Theater
- Born: Edward Friedman; June 10, 1937; New York City, U.S.
- Died: January 4, 2025 (aged 87); New York City, U.S.
- Education: Brown University (BA); Yale University (MFA)
- Spouse(s): Amy Taubin (m. 1961; div. 1972) Kate Manheim (m. 1988)

Richard Foreman (born Edward L. Friedman; June 10, 1937 – January 4, 2025) was an American avant-garde experimental playwright, director, and the founder of the Ontological-Hysteric Theater. Though highly original and singular, his work was influenced by Bertolt Brecht, Gertrude Stein, The Living Theatre, Surrealism and Dada. In the writing of his scripts the Dada cut-up technique was used.

Foreman often played the central godhead puppet master during his plays as he sat in the center of the audience in the director/engineer's seat from which he controlled the sound effects and other stage craft. He often spoke parts of the script in an omniscient voice through pre-recordings.

In May 2025, The Brooklyn Rail published a Tribute to Richard Foreman with contributions from poet Charles Bernstein, musician John Zorn, Richard Schechner, Kate Valk, Bonnie Marranca, P. Adams Sitney, Shauna Kelly, painter Susan Bee, Tony Torn, Jay Sanders, executive director and chief curator of Artists Space, Andrew Lampert, Tom Sellar, Travis Just, Felix Bernstein, Ivan Sokolov, Willem Dafoe, and artist/performer Kate Manheim.

== Achievements and awards ==
Foreman wrote, directed and designed over 50 of his own plays, both in New York City and abroad. He received three Obie Awards for Best Play of the Year, and received four other Obies for directing and for sustained achievement. Foreman has received the annual Literature Award from the American Academy and Institute of Arts and Letters, a "Lifetime Achievement in the Theater" award from the National Endowment for the Arts, the PEN American Center Master American Dramatist Award, a MacArthur Fellowship, and in 2004 was elected an officer of the Order of Arts and Letters of France.

== Early life and education ==
Edward L. Friedman was born in New York City on June 10, 1937. He was adopted by Albert and Claire (née Levine) Foreman of Scarsdale, New York, who changed his name to Richard Foreman. Foreman's birth mother was an orthodox Jew, and his birth father was Catholic "with artistic talent," according to information he received from the Jewish adoption agency, Louise Wise Services. Both his adopted parents were Jewish. Foreman said, "...my parents were very supportive, but nevertheless, I didn't feel that close to them in certain ways." At Scarsdale High School (SHS), from which he graduated in 1955, Foreman was heavily involved in the theater department.

A 2018 documentary produced by the Lower East Side Biography Project outlined Foreman's early motivations for pursuing work in the theater. The documentary maintains that Foreman suffered from extreme shyness as a child; it also reveals his adoption.

Foreman went on to study at Brown University (B.A., 1959) and received an M.F.A. in playwriting from the Yale School of Drama in 1962. As a freshman, he starred as Willy Loman in Arthur Miller's Death of a Salesman, receiving much acclaim, despite his later stated antipathy for Miller's work. Later at Brown, Foreman founded the Production Workshop, Brown University's student theatre group, while taking part in other student theater productions. In 1993, Brown presented him with an honorary doctorate. At Yale, Foreman studied under John Gassner, the drama critic and former literary manager at The Theatre Guild.

== Career ==
=== Early career and artistic influences ===
Richard Foreman moved to New York City directly after graduating from Yale School of Drama and worked as a manager of apartment complexes. Before finding his footing as a theater practitioner, Foreman became an avid patron of New York's downtown experimental theater and film scene. Foreman described feeling "overwhelmed" upon seeing The Living Theatre's productions of The Connection and The Brig. Foreman also attended screenings of avant-garde filmmaker Jonas Mekas at The Living Theatre. Mekas' early cinematic work had a profound impact on Foreman. In The Lower East Side Biography Project documentary, Foreman stated, "those [films] really got to me. I thought this is the most poetic, beautiful, creative art that I've seen Americans producing." Foreman claimed that, for a long time, he was too shy to introduce himself to Judith Malina and Julian Beck (the founders of The Living Theatre) or to Jonas Mekas, but fascinated by Mekas' work, Foreman and his wife, Amy Taubin, began following Mekas as he filmed various projects in New York.

Foreman finally inserted himself into the avant-garde scene when police interrupted a screening and seized a copy of the 1963 film, Flaming Creatures, and charged Jonas Mekas, Ken Jacobs, and Florence Karpf for violating New York's obscenity laws. Foreman called Mekas, offering his help, and over the following years, Foreman and Mekas became close friends and collaborators.

Through his connection to Jonas Mekas, Foreman became acquainted with Fluxus architect and artist, George Maciunas. Foreman began working for Mekas and Maciunas, overseeing their movie theater, the Film-Maker's Cinematheque at 80 Wooster Street. Foreman also became heavily involved in the development of Maciunas' Fluxhouse Fluxhouse Co-Operative, which consisted of converted SoHo lofts designed to be living and working spaces for artists.

During the 1960s, Foreman also got to know theater director Robert Wilson, filmmaker and actor Jack Smith, and theater director and scholar Richard Schechner, all of whom encouraged Foreman to start producing his own work. With Schechner, Foreman formed a theater collective in 1968 called "A Bunch of Experimental Theaters of New York Inc," which included seven theater companies: Mabou Mines, The Manhattan Theatre Club, Meredith Monk/The House, The Performance Group, The Theatre of the Ridiculous, Section Ten, and Foreman's company, Ontological-Hysteric Theatre. From this point on, Foreman began producing works under the moniker "Ontological-Hysteric."

==== Influence of Gertrude Stein ====
A number of scholars have called attention to the parallels between the theories of Gertrude Stein and Richard Foreman's theatrical aesthetics. Foreman himself has spoken about the significance of her writings to his work. In 1969, Foreman declared, "Gertrude Stein obviously was doing all kinds of things we haven't event caught up to yet."

Kate Davy analyzes Stein's influence on Foreman in her article, Richard Foreman's Ontological-Hysteric Theatre: The Influence of Gertrude Stein. The primary connection between the works of Stein and Foreman, she proposes, is the writers' conception of consciousness in writing. Stein preferred "entity writing" over "identity writing." According to Stein's model, "entity writing" is "the 'thing-in-itself' detached from time and association, while identity is the 'thing-in-relation,' time-bound, clinging in association." "Entity writing" is free from any notion of remembering, relationships, or narratives, and it expresses what Stein called the "continuous present." Stein's method of writing is meditative practice that requires the writer's "deliberate detachment of oneself from the external world while documenting one's own consciousness in the act of writing." Therefore, this type of writing is said to reflect the workings of the writer's mind in its presentation. Stein adopted this theory of the "continuous present" to her work as a playwright. She abandoned the theatrical conventions of narrative structure in favor of a theatrical experience that focuses on the real-time consciousness—one in which "the spectator can move 'out' of the composition, or stop, at any moment without creating syncopated emotional time."

Foreman's theatrical experiences invoke Stein's theories in that they both abandon narrative, focusing on the here-and-now, and they seem to include Foreman's "process of making the play" in the presentation of the play. In his essay, "How I Write My (Self: Plays)," Foreman explains his process of taking text to performance: "The writing tending towards a more receptive, open, passive receiving of 'what wants to be written' and the staging tending towards more active organization of the 'arrived' elements of the writing -- finding ways to make the writing inhabit a constructed environment."

Davy notes that like Stein, Foreman tends to avoid "'emotional traps' or the intentional manipulation of an audiences emotional responses by eliminating the 'lifelike' qualities of drama (clearly developing situation involving imaginary people in imaginary places), thereby creating a world into which the spectator has great difficulty projecting himself." Davy gives the example of Foreman's characters often referring to themselves in the third person, which creates an alienating effect for the audience member who cannot project themself into the experience of the character. Through Foreman's alienating characterization, the audience is made to look at Foreman's actors as "self-enclosed units," or theatrical props, rather than characters. Therefore, Foreman's aesthetics demand that the spectator not escape into the play, but become conscious of their own process of interpretation. In Foreman's essay, "14 Things I Tell Myself," he elaborates, "Our art then = a learning how to look at 'A' and 'B' and see not them but a relation that cannot be 'seen.' You can't look at 'it' (that relation) because it IS the looking itself. That's where he looking (you) is, doing the looking." Davy points out that "by eliminating internal punctuation in long complicated sentences," Stein's writing produces a similar effect for her readers who have to actively take part in discerning Stein's words.

=== Ontological-Hysteric Theater ===
The Ontological-Hysteric Theater (OHT) was founded by Foreman in 1968. The core of the company's annual programming has been Richard Foreman's theater pieces. Foreman mounted his first production with Ontological-Hysteric Theatre in 1968 at the Film-Maker's Cinematheque on Wooster Street, where he worked under the Fluxus leader George Maciunas. Ontological-Hysteric Theatre balances a primitive and minimal art style with extremely complex and theatrical themes. OHT's first productions, Angelface (1968) and Ida-Eyed (1969), received almost no critical attention. By the mid-1970s, however, OHT gained traction with relatively popular works such as Sophia = (Wisdom) Part 3: The Cliffs (1972).

=== Critical analysis ===
In his 1973 essay, "Richard Foreman's Ontological-Hysteric Theatre," theater critic Michael Kirby aptly breaks down the aesthetics of OHT through the case study of Foreman's play Sophia = (Wisdom) Part 3: The Cliffs. Kirby uses the elements of setting, picturization, speech, written material, control, movement and dances, sound, objects, relation to film, structure, content, and effect to analyze Foreman's theatrical vocabulary. Among his observations, Kirby notes that although "Sophia" is a play without a plot, it produces its own kind of structure of "thematic webs of visual and verbal ideas and references." Foreman achieves this visual structure through "picturization.' By picturization, Kirby means that Foreman's staging is presented as "sequences of static pictures" in which the actors adjust themselves into tableaux as opposed to moving continuously throughout the play. Kirby also notes that Foreman makes use of written text that is projected on screens on the set. These projected words, Kirby describes, are both direct addresses to the spectator and "expository information". Kirby also writes about how Foreman literally controlled the pace and tempo of every performance of "Sophia." During the performance, Foreman would sit at a table in front of the stage, controlling the projections and sound cues. By acting as stage manager, Foreman was able to insert himself into the performance as it unfolded. Kirby also discusses the role of sound in Foreman's plays. He writes, "Noise, too, serves as both background and as an explicit part of the action." At times, recordings of lines take over for the actors' actual voice, creating a sense of alienation.

==== Ontological-Hysteric Incubator ====
The Ontological-Hysteric Theater prided itself on nurturing the talents of young and emerging theater practitioners. According to their website, "the Ontological-Hysteric Theater Incubator was a starting point for many artists making their mark in New York City and internationally; including David Herskovitz, Artistic Director of Target Margin Theater, Damon Keily, Artistic Director of American Theater in Chicago, Radiohole, Elevator Repair Service, Pavol Liska, NTUSA, as well as Richard Maxwell, Sophie Haviland, Bob Cucuzza, DJ Mendel, Ken Nintzle and Young Jean Lee."

In 1993, The Ontological-Hysteric Theater began their emerging artists program by initiating the Blueprint Series for emerging directors. In 2005, OHT reorganized their emerging artists program under the name INCUBATOR, "creating a series of linked programs to provide young theater artists with resources and support to develop process-oriented, original theatrical productions." The INCUBATOR programs include a residency program, two annual music festivals, a regular concert series, a serial work-in-progress program called Short Form, and round tables and salons. The program received an OBIE grant in 2010.

=== Collaborations and work outside of the Ontological-Hysteric Theatre ===
Foreman's work has been primarily produced by and performed at the Ontological-Hysteric Theater in New York, though he also directed such productions as Bertolt Brecht's The Threepenny Opera at Lincoln Center and the premiere of Suzan-Lori Parks's Venus at the Public Theater.

==== Stage productions ====
Foreman's plays have been co-produced by The New York Shakespeare Festival, La Mama Theatre, The Wooster Group, Patrick Kennedy, the Festival d'Automne in Paris and the Vienna Festival. Foreman has collaborated (as librettist and stage director) with composer Stanley Silverman on eight music theater pieces produced by The Music Theater Group and The New York City Opera. He has also directed and designed many classical productions with major theaters around the world including, The Threepenny Opera, The Golem and plays by Václav Havel, Botho Strauss, and Suzan-Lori Parks for The New York Shakespeare Festival, Die Fledermaus at the Paris Opera, Don Giovanni at the Opéra de Lille, Philip Glass's Fall of the House of Usher at the American Repertory Theater and The Maggio Musicale Fiorentino in Florence, Woyzeck at Hartford Stage Company, Molière's Don Juan at the Guthrie Theater and The New York Shakespeare Festival, Kathy Acker's Birth of the Poet at the Brooklyn Academy of Music and the RO theater in Rotterdam, Gertrude Stein's Doctor Faustus Lights the Lights at the Autumn Festivals in Berlin and Paris.

In 2024, The Wooster Group staged a new interpretation, with Foreman's permission, of Symphony of Rats. Since 2014, British director Patrick Kennedy has staged a number of Foreman works, including a 2019 season of 3 plays at New Wimbledon Theatre. Kennedy's most recent adaptation of Foreman was at New Theatre in Sydney in 2024 with Sophia=(Wisdom) Part 3: The Cliffs.

==== Scripts ====
Seven collections of Foreman's plays have been published. Books studying his scripts and plays have been published in English, French, and German.

==== Bridge Project ====
In 2004, Foreman established The Bridge Project with Sophie Haviland to promote international art exchange between countries around the world through workshops, symposiums, theater productions, visual art, performance and multimedia events.

== Personal life and death ==
In 1961, Foreman married Amy Taubin; they divorced in 1972. In 1988, he married Kate Manheim. Foreman died from complications of pneumonia at Mount Sinai West Hospital in New York City.

== Archive ==
Foreman's archives and work materials have been acquired by the Fales Library at New York University (NYU).

== Major works ==
=== Plays ===
- Angelface, New York City (1968)
- Ida-Eyed, New York City (1969)
- Total Recall, New York City (1970)
- HcOhTiEnLa (or) Hotel China, New York City (1971)
- Dream Tantras for Western Massachusetts, Lennox, Massachusetts (1971) (music by Stanley Silverman)
- Evidence, New York City (1972)
- Sophia= (Wisdom) Part 3: The Cliffs, New York City (1972)
- Particle Theory, New York City (1973)
- Classical Therapy or A Week under the Influence ... , Paris (1973)
- Pain(t), New York City (1974)
- Vertical Mobility, New York City (1974)
- Pandering to the Masses: A Misrepresentation, New York City (1975)
- Rhoda in Potatoland (Her Fall-Starts), New York City (1975)
- Livre des Splendeurs: Part One, Paris (1976)
- Book of Splendors: Part Two (Book of Levers) Action at a Distance, New York City (1977)
- Blvd. de Paris (I've Got the Shakes), New York City (1977)
- Madness and Tranquility (My Head Was a Sledgehammer), New York City (1979)
- Place + Target, Rome (1980)
- Penguin Touquet, New York City (1981)
- Café Amérique, Paris (1981)
- Egyptology, New York City (1983)
- La Robe de Chambre de Georges Bataille, Paris (1983)
- Miss Universal Happiness, New York City (1985)
- The Cure, New York City (1986)
- Film Is Evil: Radio Is Good, New York City (1987)
- Symphony of Rats, New York City (1987)
- Love and Science, Stockholm (1988)
- What Did He See? New York City (1988)
- Lava, New York City (1989)
- Eddie Goes to Poetry City: Part One, Seattle (1990)
- Eddie Goes to Poetry City: Part Two, New York City (1991)
- The Mind King, New York City (1992)
- Samuel's Major Problems, New York City (1993)
- My Head Was a Sledgehammer, New York City (1994)
- I've Got the Shakes, New York City (1995)
- The Universe, New York City (1995)
- Permanent Brain Damage, New York City (1996) (toured to London)
- Pearls for Pigs, Hartford, Connecticut (1997) (toured to Montreal, Paris, Rome, Los Angeles, and New York City)
- Benita Canova, New York City (1997)
- Paradise Hotel (Hotel Fuck), New York City (1998) (toured to Paris, Copenhagen, Salzburg and Berlin)
- Bad Boy Nietzsche, New York City (2000) (toured to Brussels, Berlin and Tokyo)
- Now That Communism Is Dead, My Life Feels Empty, New York City (2001) (toured to Vienna and the Netherlands)
- Maria Del Bosco, New York City (2002) (toured to Singapore)
- Panic! (How to Be Happy!), New York City (2003) (toured to Zurich and Vienna)
- King Cowboy Rufus Rules the Universe!, New York City (2004)
- The Gods Are Pounding My Head! AKA Lumberjack Messiah, New York City (2005)
- ZOMBOID! (Film/Performance Project #1), New York City (2006)
- WAKE UP MR. SLEEPY! YOUR UNCONSCIOUS MIND IS DEAD!, New York City (2007)
- DEEP TRANCE BEHAVIOR IN POTATOLAND (A RICHARD FOREMAN THEATER MACHINE), New York City (2008)
- IDIOT SAVANT, New York City (2009)
- OLD-FASHIONED PROSTITUTES (A TRUE ROMANCE), New York City (2013)
- Suppose Beautiful Madeline Harvey, New York City (2024)

=== Opera ===
- Elephant Steps, Tanglewood (1968) / New York City (1970) (music by Stanley Silverman)
- Dr. Selavy's Magic Theater, New York City (1972) (music by Stanley Silverman)
- Hotel for Criminals, New York City (1974) (music by Stanley Silverman)
- American Imagination, New York City (1978) (music by Stanley Silverman)
- Madame Adare, New York City (1980) (music by Stanley Silverman)
- Africanus Instructus, New York City (1986) (music by Stanley Silverman)
- Love & Science, New York City (1990) (music by Stanley Silverman)
- WHAT TO WEAR, Los Angeles (2006 (music by Michael Gordon)
- ASTRONOME: A NIGHT AT THE OPERA, New York City (2009) (music by John Zorn)

=== Film and video ===
- Out of the Body Travel, video play (1975)
- City Archives, video play (1977)
- Strong Medicine, feature film (1978)
- Radio Rick in Heaven and Radio Richard in Hell, film (1987)
- Total Rain, video play (1990)
- Once Every Day, feature film (2012)
- Now You See It Now You Don't, feature film (2017)
- Mad Love, feature film (2018)

=== Books ===
- Plays and Manifestos (1976)
- Theatre of Images (1977)
- Reverberation Machines: The Later Plays and Essays (1986)
- Love and Science: Selected Librettos by Richard Foreman (1991)
- Unbalancing Acts: Foundations for a Theater (1993)
- My Head Was a Sledgehammer: Six Plays (1995)
- No-body: A Novel in Parts (1996)
- Paradise Hotel and Other Plays (2001)
- Richard Foreman (Art + Performance) (2005)
- Bad Boy Nietzsche! and Other Plays (2005)
- Manifestos and Essays (2010)
- Plays with Films (New York: Contra Mundum Press, 2013)
- Plays for the Public (Theatre Communications Group, 2019)

== Awards and honors ==
Foreman won seven Village Voice Obie Awards, including three for "Best Play", and one for Lifetime Achievement. In addition, he received:

- 1972 – Guggenheim Fellowship for Playwriting
- 1974 – Rockefeller Foundation Playwrights Grant
- 1990 – Ford Foundation play development grant for Eddie Goes to Poetry City
- 1990 – National Endowment for the Arts (NEA) Distinguished Artist Fellowship for Lifetime Achievement in Theater
- 1992 – American Academy and Institute of Arts and Letters Award in Literature
- 1992 & 1995 – NEA Playwriting Fellowship
- 1995-2000 – MacArthur Fellowship
- 1996 – Edwin Booth Award for Theatrical Achievement
- 2001 – PEN/Laura Pels Theater Award Master American Playwright Award
- 2004 – Officer of the Order of Arts and Letters of France

== See also ==
- Avant-garde
- Experimental theatre
- The Flea Theater
- Fluxus
- Gesamtkunstwerk
- Happenings
- Dick Higgins
- Intermedia
- Allan Kaprow
- Patrick Kennedy
- Elizabeth LeCompte
- Ontological-Hysteric Theater
- Performance art
- Richard Schechner
- Theatre
- Theater District, Manhattan
- Theatre of the Ridiculous
- Speculations: An Essay on the Theater
- Mac Wellman
- The Wooster Group
