= Halbwelt Kultur =

- Official poster of the show
- Music: Kurt Weill, Bertolt Brecht, Fats Waller, Mischa Spoliansky, Friedrich Hollander
- Book: Patrick Kennedy, Stephanie Martin
- Productions: 2012 Churchill Theatre tryout 2012 Notting Hill Festival; 2013 New Wimbledon Theatre; 2013 Riverside Studios; 2013 Battersea Mess and Music Hall; 2013 Jermyn Street Theatre; 2019 The Other Palace

Halbwelt Kultur is a 2012 musical cabaret based on the lives of seven highly influential women of the Weimar Republic.

An original concept by Patrick Kennedy, the show was devised by PK Productions and includes music by Hans Eisler, Bertolt Brecht, Friedrich Hollaender, Mischa Spoliansky and Fats Waller. The 2012 Churchill Theatre Bromley Cabaret VIP pre-show production became a hit and spawned a seven cast strong production premiering at the New Wimbledon Theatre in April 2013.

The show presents snapshot vignettes of the women set against the sound of the period's finest songs and the backdrop of the rise of World War II. It is based on verbatim interviews and accounts of the period and is a series of Brechtian vignettes magnifying the personalities of the women's lives. Each vignette is framed with a famous song from the period and describes the rise to success of the women and the ultimate fleeing from Berlin due to the growing threat of Nazism.

== Etymology ==
Halbwelt Kultur is a German portmanteau meaning 'Underworld Culture', a calque of French demi-monde, and comes from a 1927 book Ladies of the Underworld by Netley Lucas:

- The German is gross in his immorality, he likes his Halb-Welt or underworld pleasures to be devoid of any Kultur or refinement, he enjoys obscenity in a form which even the Parisian would not tolerate.

== Productions ==
=== Original Bromley production ===
The show was developed in August 2012 as a VIP pre-show to Rufus Norris' Cabaret at the Churchill Theatre Bromley. It was a one-woman show portraying the stories of seven Weimar women backed by a five-piece band. The show ran for a sold-out four performances in the Studio space before being invited to take part in the Scratch Beneath Festival in Notting Hill. The production was directed by Patrick Kennedy and performed by Stephanie Martin.

The show was remarkable for its innovative use of original Weimar era music combined with verbatim monologues taken from history books, autobiographies and recorded material.

=== Scratch Beneath Festival ===
Following the success of the Churchill Theatre run, the production was invited to be part of the Scratch Beneath new writing festival at the Pop-Up Cinema in Notting Hill in October 2012.

The performance took place in a converted overpass archway now functioning as a cinema. The show retained its original format of a one-woman show and expanded its use of technology by incorporating a large projection screen displaying information and pictures of the seven women portrayed in the show. The production was accompanied by a full band.

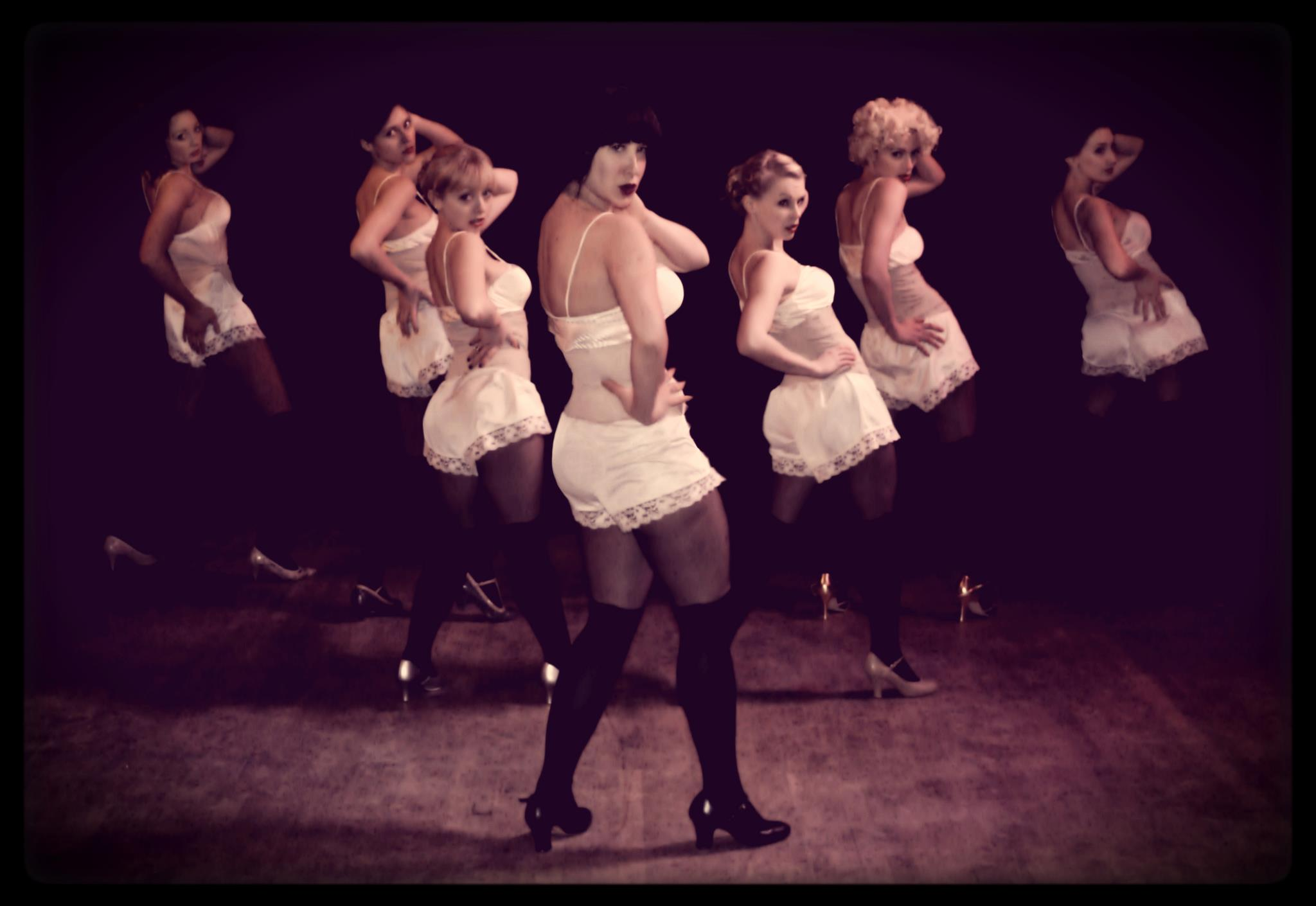
Performance at New Wimbledon Studio

=== New Wimbledon Studio production ===
In April 2013 a new seven cast strong production of the show opened at the New Wimbledon Theatre in the studio space as part of their Fresh Ideas programme. The production ran for four sold out performances and garnered attention from critics and producers.

The production expanded to incorporating seven performers each representing a Weimar woman portrayed in the show. New musical pieces were added and large, stylistic group choreography was incorporated.

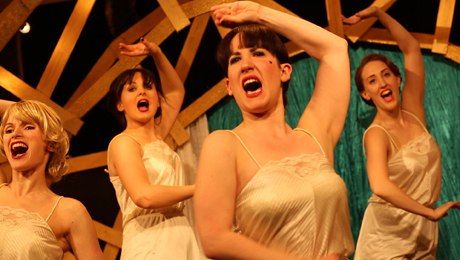
Performance at Riverside Studios

=== Riverside Studios ===
During May and June 2013, the show was incorporated into Ruby in the Dust's production of The Great Gatsby musical at the Riverside Studios in Hammersmith, London. The performances there garnered several outstanding reviews from critics including The Guardian who described the troupe as:

A stunning female septet... with their talent as singer-dancers and their silky underwear, they stirringly evoke the self-conscious decadence of the Jazz Age.

During the production at Riverside Studios, the troupe of performers protested outside the Russian embassy against the introduction of anti-gay law. This was in the form of a kissing protest.

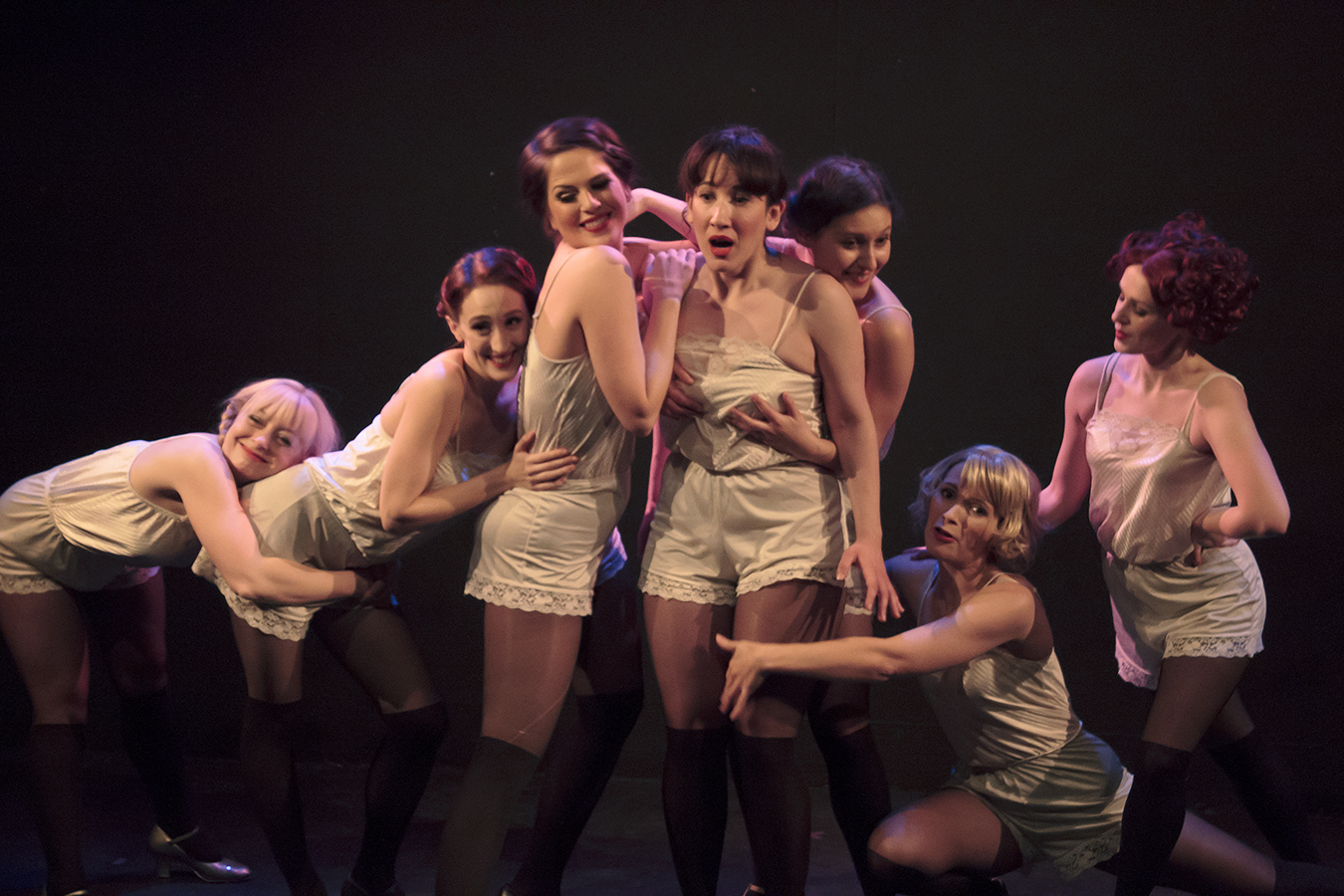
Jermyn Street Theatre

=== Jermyn Street Theatre ===
The show played to further critical acclaim at the Jermyn Street Theatre from November–December 2013.

The show ran for three weeks over the Christmas period at the Jermyn Street Theatre with a new band under the musical supervision of Peter Mitchell assisted by musical directors Adam Morris and Phil Mitchell. The repertoire of songs had expanded further including two new group numbers.

Upon completing the run, the show entered a re-development phase in preparation for publication and licensing.
