= Citizens of the Universe =

The current COTU logo.

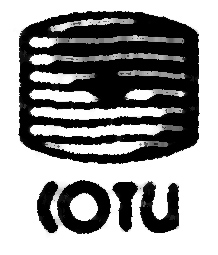
The original COTU logo by XGN

Citizens of the Universe, also referred to as 'COTU', is a guerrilla theatre specializing in 'found space' performances and is currently headquartered in Charlotte, North Carolina. There are branches of COTU also located in Orlando, Florida, Baltimore, Maryland, and Greenville, South Carolina.

COTU was founded in 2001 by James Cartee and Andrew Bryant in Greenville, South Carolina with core artist Dan A. R. Kelly, Jason Bryant and Traysie Amick added in 2002. COTU's work ranges from original works and foreign language pieces to classics with a recent focus on films that have been adapted for stage.

In 2004, the group's production of Arthur Miller's The Creation of the World and Other Business was banned from playing at Greenville Technical College.

In 2010, COTU adapted a business model where all showings became a suggested donation. This decision was made so that their work would be able to be available to anyone at any time.

== Current core artists ==
James Cartee, Tom Ollis, James Lee Walker II, Courtney Varnum, Mimi Presley and Bret Kimbrough

== Show history ==
- Ives in the Back of My Head (2001). A collection of David Ives one acts performed at the Handlebar in Greenville, SC
- Rosencrantz & Guildenstern are Dead (2002). performed at the Handlebar in Greenville, SC
- The Tragedy (2003). An original piece by Dan A. R. Kelly that was taken to competition at the South Carolina Theatre Conference. Traysie Amick was given 'Best Actress' for her performance in the piece.
- Equus (2004). Performed in a horse stable located in Cleveland Park in downtown Greenville, SC.
- The Creation of the World and Other Business (2004). This show was banned by the President of Greenville Technical College where the show was being performed due to complaints from the community of Bob Jones University. COTU was performing the Equus show simultaneously with this production.
- 3/24: A 24 Hour Theatre Project (2005)
- The Tragedy (2005). Performed at the Old Faithful Inn in Yellowstone National Park.
- Trainspotting (2008). Performed at the World Famous Milestone Club in Charlotte, NC
- Night of the Living Dead (2008). A 'Zombiewalk' was organized and timed to end in the parking lot of the performance space as the show ended
- Fight Club (2009). Performed in a parking lot with lighting and sound elements provided by vehicles
- Reservoir Dogs (2010). Performed in a warehouse in Charlotte, NC, this production won a Metrolina Theatre Association Award for Outstanding Special Technical Effect (Amanda Liles and Rebecca Brown) and Outstanding Supporting Actor (Tom Ollis). James Cartee won a 'Best Director' and Berry Newkirk won a 'Newcomer of the Year' (for Mr. Orange) Perry Award for their work.
- Uncle Vanya (2010) James Cartee won a 'Best Costume Designer in a Comedy' and Annette Saunders won a 'Best Supporting Actress'(for Yelena Serebryakov) Perry Award for their work on Uncle Vanya.
- Trainspotting (2010). James Cartee won a 'Best Director' Perry Award for his work.
- GONZO: A Brutal Chrysalis (2009–2014). In 2010, GONZO was performed for a fund raising event for Shakespeare Carolina.
- The Princess Bride (2011) Performed in an 80's dance club in uptown Charlotte, NC. This production won a MTA award for 'Best use of Space' in a comedy category.
- Love Conquers All: A Quiet Evening with Sid & Nancy (2011). This is an original piece written by James Cartee. This production won MTA awards for 'Best Actor'(Berry Newkirk), 'Outstanding Director'(Nick Iammatteo), 'Outstanding Production', and 'Outstanding Supporting Actor-Male' (Tom Moody).
- GONZO: A Brutal Chrysalis (2009–2014). In 2011, GONZO was performed for a full run at 'The Mill' in Charlotte, NC.
- Rosencrantz & Guildenstern are Dead (2012). This show was directed again by James Cartee at the Chop Shop (NODA), a musical venue in Charlotte, NC.
- Dr. Horrible's Sing Along Blog (2012). Performed in two music venues with two cast and live music in Charlotte, NC: the Chop Shop and Petra's Piano Bar.
- GONZO: A Brutal Chrysalis (2009–2014). In 2011, GONZO was performed for a limited run at 'The Roux' in Charlotte, NC. After adding a multimedia element designed by the 'Holographic Biscuit' (aka, Adam Parrish), the show was performed at the New Orleans Fringe Festival. The performance took place at the St. Roch Tavern.
- Eternal Sunshine of the Spotless Mind (2013). Performed at a bar called the WineUp in Charlotte, NC's NODA district. This multimedia world premiere featured blocking that involved the audience seated on rotating chairs in the center of the action.
- Titus Andronicus (2013) Jennifer Quigley directed this bloody Shakespeare piece on the back deck of the bar/ band venue, Snug Harbor (Charlotte, NC- Plaza Midwood).
- The Queen City Fringe Festival (2013) COTU helped coordinate a fringe festival that occurred throughout several neighborhood in East Charlotte. It utilized 26 venues and had 110 performers. The Festival reoccurs every odd numbered year.
- Eternal Sunshine of the Spotless Mind (2014). Performed at the UpStage in Charlotte, NC's NODA district. This was a repeat performance from the previous year with only the two main leads returning and a larger budget.
- The Big Lebowski (2014). Performed at the UpStage in Charlotte, NC's NODA district and Directed by James Cartee. This version offered a re-imagined dance version of 'Gutterballs'.
- The Merry Wives of Windsor (2014). Performed at the UpStage in Charlotte, NC's NODA district and Directed by Megan Sky. This version offered a modern Commedia take with 16 original masks. Starring David Pollack, Amanda Liles, and Farrel Paules.
- The Night of the Iguana (2014) Performed at the UpStage in Charlotte, NC's NODA district and Directed by Megan Sky. This version offered a set design of pallet walls. Starring Stephenie DiPaulo, Brian Willard, Nancy Gaines.
- The Carolina Arts and Theatre Awards.(2014) COTU threw a Charlotte area arts awards. Performers included: Jill O'Neill, Johnny Millwater, Caroline Calouche, Mark Doepker, Alison Foster Johnson, William Jacobs, and Deana Pendragon as host with Megan Sky.
- The End of the World Sampler Platter.(2014) This was a presentation of original works with the theme "...the end of the world". 14 plays were selected and 9 were produced.
- A Disturbance in Whitechapel.(2014) An original walking, environmental show by James Cartee. The play took place on one city block of N. Davidson between 36th st. and 35th. The show found back alleys, shops, and bars to present a mystery loosely based on the Jack the Ripper killings. This show featured five possible endings that were determined by a card game amongst the killers at the beginning of the show.
- T.V. Funhouse.(2014) An satirization of a block Saturday TV programming written by James Cartee.
- Everybody Comes to Rick's (2015). Performed in monochrome body paint at the UpStage performance space.
- 1984.(2015) Dramatic Publishing's version of George Orwell's book, directed by Michael Anderson. This was the first show in COTU lineup of 'First Directors' programming. This was performed at the SEEDS flex space.
- GONZO: Fear & Loathing (2015) This is a sequel to Paul Addis' "GONZO: A Brutal Chrysalis." After discovering Addis had committed suicide by jumping in front of a BART train in San Francisco, Cartee decided to write two more sequels based on the life of Hunter S. Thompson.
- Durang vs. Ives: The New Director's Night (2015) This was the third showing for 'First Directors'. This featured five David Ives pieces from 'All in the Timing' as well as Christopher Durang's 'The Actor's Nightmare'. This was performed at the SEEDS flex space.
- The Rocky Horror Show (2015) This was the fourth showing for 'First Directors'. Richard O'Brien's musical was performed at the SEEDS flex space and directed by Avalon Rose.
- The Lion in Winter (2015) Directed by James Cartee. This was performed at the SEEDS flex space and ran at the same time as COTU's Beowulf.
- Beowulf (2015) Directed by Megan Sky. This was an original, collaborative script performed at the Duke Energy Theater and ran at the same time as COTU's The Lion in Winter.
- An Adult Evening with Shel Silverstein (2015) Multiple directors. Performed at SEEDS flex space.
- Carolina Arts & Theatre Awards (2015)
- A Disturbance in Whitechapel: The Ripper Returns (2015) Directed by Megan Sky. This was an original script by James Cartee featuring two storylines running simultaneously and five different ending from the previous year. This show ran once again in the NoDa Arts district.
- Nosferatu: A Silent Experience (2015) Directed by James Cartee. This was an original script by James Cartee-based on Friedrich Wilhelm Murnau's 1922 classic. This show had one speaking part, with projected lines on the side of a building where it was performed – Salvaged Beauty NoDa.
- The Woolgatherer (2015) Directed by David Pollack. William Mastrosimone's two person piece was performed at the former Carolina Actor's Studio Theatre space that had been shut down and abandoned for two years.
- Seascape (2016) Directed by Stan Lee. Edward Albee's piece was performed at the former Carolina Actor's Studio Theatre space that had been shut down and abandoned for three years. The set consisted of draped canvas with sand over platforms to simulate dunes. Full body makeup was used on the actors portraying the lizards provided by Kenya Davis.
- GONZO: A Brutal Chrysalis (2016) Directed by Tom Ollis. This piece was performed at two points during the year when two other original showings had fallen through (The Adventures of Mr. Marshall in Space and The Man in the Iron Mask) for various reasons. The first showing took place at the Barn located on Central Ave. in Charlotte, NC. A space connected to a business by the name of Pure Pizza who had just a couple of months beforehand been the catalyst for the HB2 "bathroom bill". The second showing was at the Duke Energy Theater. This was announced to be the last showing of this version of the show starring James Cartee in Charlotte. Unlike all previous versions, which utilized simple showings in found spaces or bars, this had a full theatre setting and lighting.
- O'Brother Where Art Thou (2016) Directed by Courtney Varnum and James Cartee. This adaption of the Cohen Brother's film (itself an adaption of The Odyssey by Homer) was performed outside at NoDa Brewery.
- The Hitchhiker's Guide to the Galaxy (2016) Directed by James Cartee. This adaptation of Douglas Adams' piece was performed at the Unknown Brewery.
- Trainspotting (2023). James Cartee directs, at two venues in Lake Worth Beach, FL: Mustic Roots Kava and a shuttered burger restaurant.
- A Midsummer Night's Dream (2023). This was the first part of a series called "Shakespeare on the Ave" in April. With a 50's diner theme, this show was directed by Sam McCue. It was performed outside at the satge on the lawn of the Lake Worth Cultural Center in Lake Worth, FL, with the cast and crew parading through downtown each night before and after the show from the nearby Lake Worth Playhouse.
- Macbeth (2023). This was the second part of a series called "Shakespeare on the Ave" in August. Directed by James Cartee and featuring "found" props, costumes, and technical items. This was performed at HATCH, the city's art gallery which was once a shuffle board court.
- Waiting for Godot (2023) This was performed in October at Actors' Rep at Bob Carter's Actor's Workshop and Repertory Theatre. Directed by the actors: James Cartee, Rogelio Gonzalez, David Tamurkin, Sudhir Jain, Seth Suchy, and Phil Amico.
- GONZO: A Brutal Chrysalis (2025) This was performed in May at 10Ten Brewery during the Orlando Fringe Festival. James Cartee retired the show 6 years earlier but returned for the 20th anniversary of Hunter Thomson's death. The script was moved into the public domain at the end of the run.
- Things That I Destroy: The Overmedicated Misadventures Of An Autistic Antiheroine (2025) Performed in May at Orlando Family Stage Scarlet Venue during Orlando Fringe Festival. An original piece was written by Ilana Jael chronicling her time and issues dealing with being autistic (amongst other issues)from a child to each day of the performance. She would re-write sections based on her previous day, adding events as they unfolded during the Fringe festival. Directed by: James. Lee walker II.
- Karma is a Bitch (2026) Performed in May at Orlando Shakespeare Brown Venue during Orlando Fringe Festival. An original piece was written by Ilana Jael, directed by James Cartee.
