= Patrick Kennedy (director) =

British theatre director (born 1985)

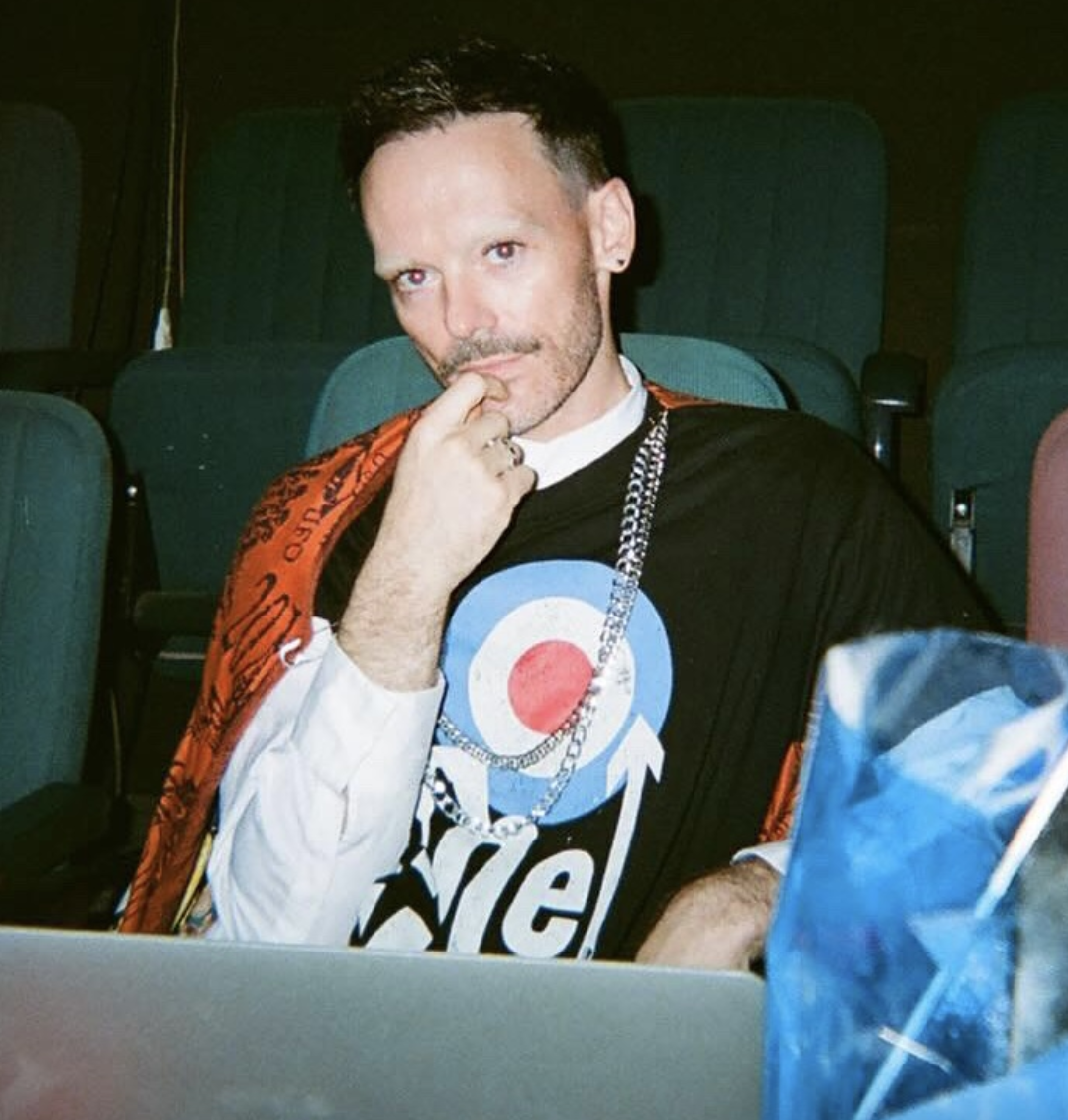
- Patrick Kennedy in 2024
- Born: 12 February 1985 (age 41); Huddersfield, England
- Occupations: CEO, Sydney Fringe & Theatre director

Patrick Kennedy (born 12 February 1985) is a British-Australian theatre director, producer, and theatre administrator. Since 2025, he is the Chief Executive Officer of Sydney Fringe. He is also the founder of The Patrick Kennedy Theatre Machine based in London and Sydney. He is a leading expert on the work of Richard Foreman.

Most notable for creating and directing new musical Halbwelt Kultur and directing several UK premieres of Richard Foreman and Stanley Silverman's work, Kennedy's career has focused on avant garde plays and musicals.

== Early life ==
Kennedy was born in Huddersfield, West Yorkshire, England. He was educated at the University of Birmingham graduating with a degree in French, Italian and Chinese. He completed a Master of Philosophy research degree at the university specializing in American actor training techniques of the twentieth century.

== Career ==
Patrick Kennedy with composer Stanley Silverman

Kennedy is the founder of Patrick Kennedy Theatre Machine (originally The Phenomenological Theatre)active since 2008, during which his 2009 production of The Lesson won critical acclaim from The Scotsman.

He is recognised for his distinctive and idiosyncratic style incorporating elements of dada, vaudeville, grotesque and surrealism.

In 2012 he devised and directed Halbwelt Kultur at the Churchill Theatre. The show was the VIP pre-show to Rufus Norris's Cabaret during its run at the theatre before moving on to Notting Hill, Battersea, Riverside Studios and Jermyn Street Theatre.

In 2013, Kennedy directed the second and largest incarnation of If It Only Even Runs A Minute at the London Hippodrome. In 2014, Kennedy directed the London premiere of Up From Paradise by Arthur Miller and European premiere of Doctor Selavy's Magic Theatre by Richard Foreman. In April 2014, Kennedy devised and directed a celebratory concert at the London Hippodrome of American composer Stanley Silverman. In November 2014 he adapted and directed the world premiere of The Cherry Orchard set in London in 1976.

Patrick Kennedy in 2017

In January 2016, Kennedy directed the four hour tribute concert to David Bowie following the singer's death. Titled Starman: A Celebration Of David Bowie, the concert took place at the Union Chapel in Islington and featured established acts such as Dan Gillespie-Sells and The Magic Numbers.

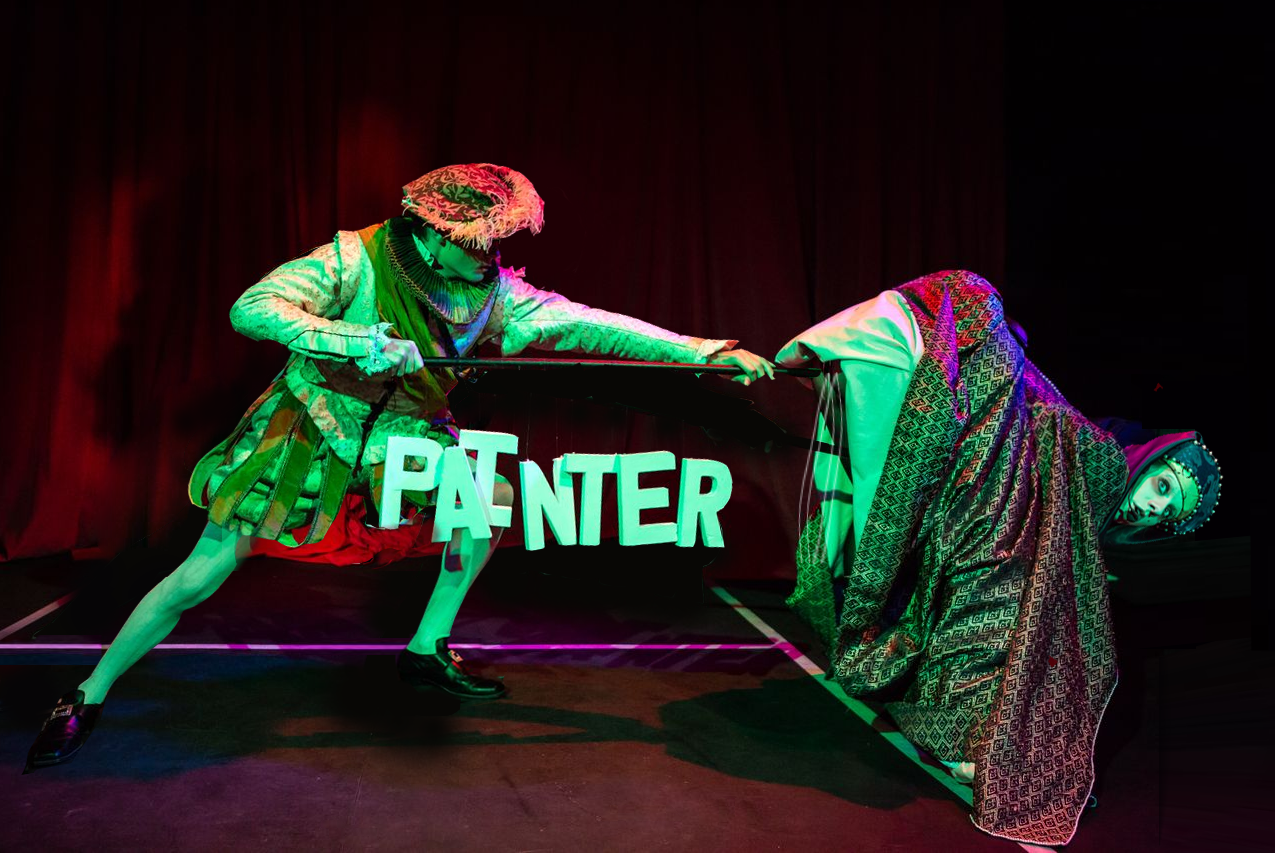
Image of two characters from the play Pain(t)

In October 2016, Kennedy once again worked with Stanley Silverman to bring another Silverman/Foreman premiere to the UK. Hotel For Criminals played at New Wimbledon Studio from 18–29 October and garnered critical acclaim for its bold, unique and surreal visuals.

Continuing to bring the work of Richard Foreman to the UK, Kennedy directed, designed, choreographed and produced the UK premiere of King Cowboy Rufus Rules The Universe at the London Theatre Workshop. Critics called the production "An ambitious, brave play. Genuinely unsettling, disorientating and confrontational" and declared Kennedy as "one of the country's most fascinating theatre practitioners".

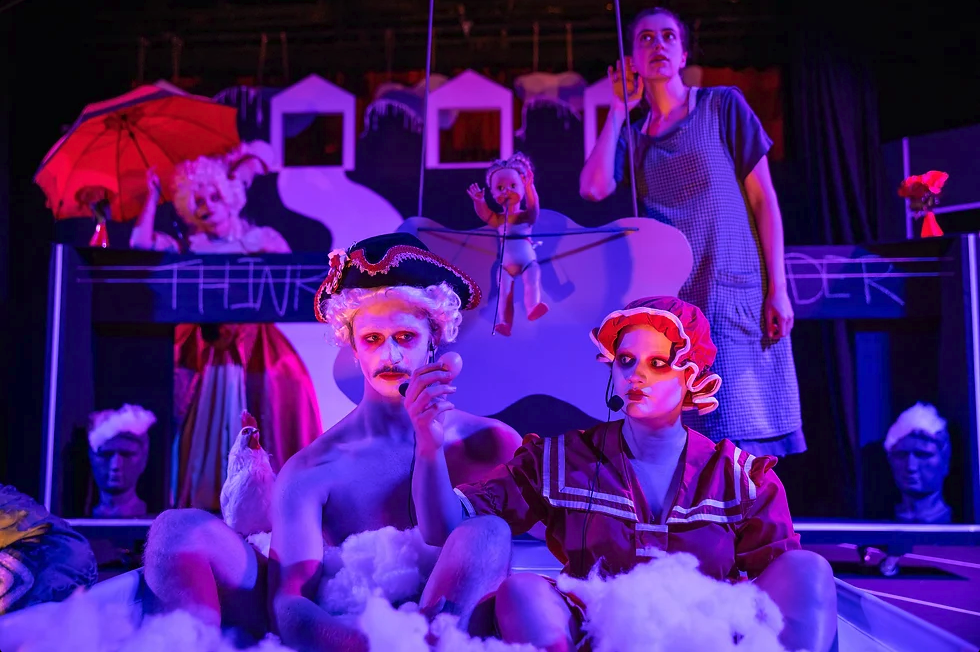
Sophia=(Wisdom): The Cliffs – Production Photo

On 7 December 2018, Kennedy announced a year long partnership with New Wimbledon Theatre entitled Foreman At Fifty, a season of three plays from three unique parts of Richard Foreman's career to celebrate his 50th anniversary as a theatre maker.

Following a move to Australia, Kennedy announced the Asia Pacific premiere of Richard Foreman’s Sophia=(Wisdom) Part 3: The Cliffs. Playing at New Theatre, Sydney from 10–27 January 2024, the production marked Kennedy’s return to directing after a five year break. Receiving universal acclaim, critics stated that "you will not forget Patrick Kennedy's first Australian production."

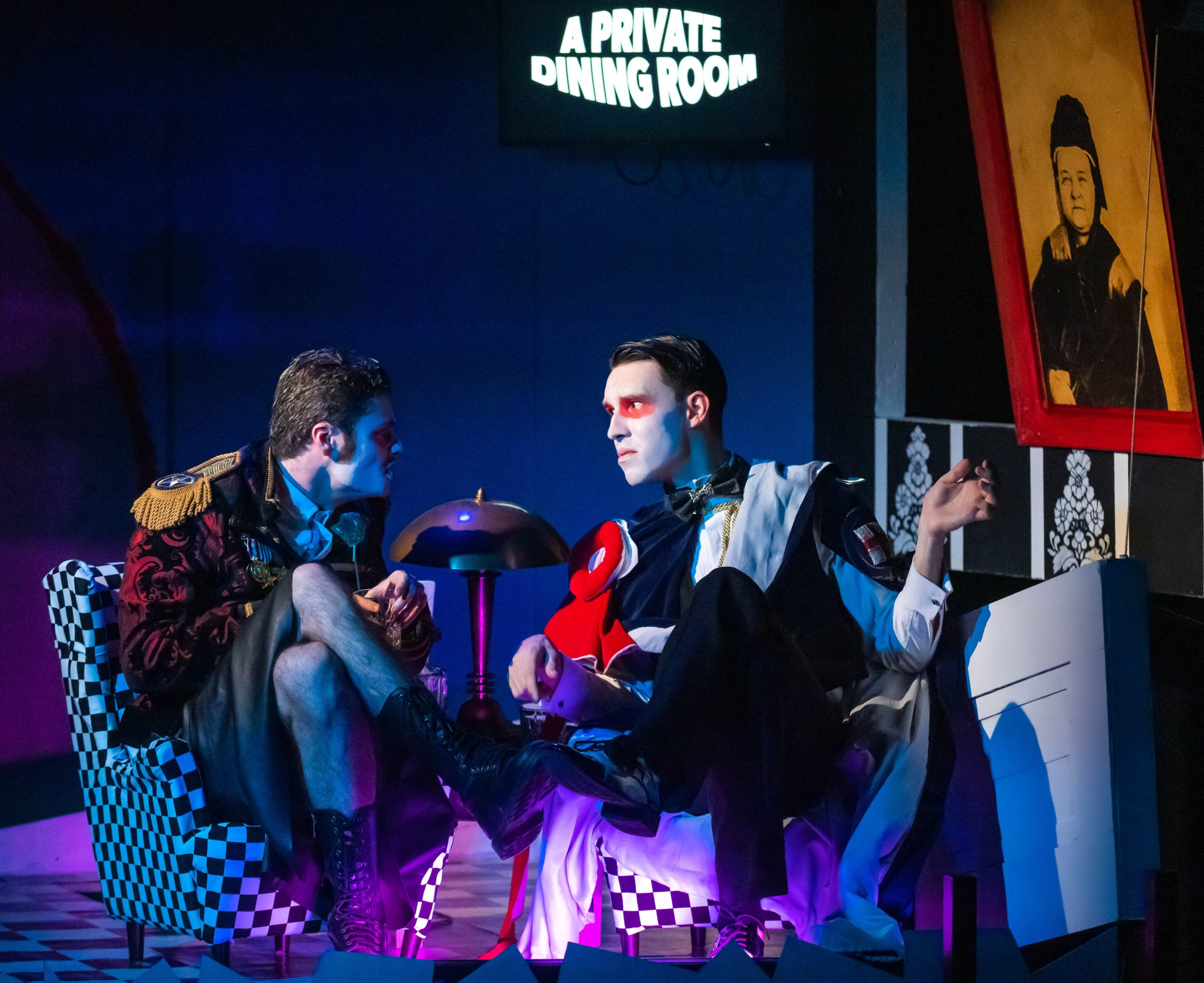
The Flea at New Theatre

Returning to New Theatre in February 2025, Kennedy directed and designed the Mardi Gras production of The Flea. Hailed as "one of the most thrilling shows of the year", "a masterclass in surreal aesthetics" and "exciting theatre making stuffed with visual delights", the production played from 4 Feb - 8 Mar. The production marked the Australian premiere of the play and featured an all-Australian cast of performers.

In February 2026, Kennedy directed and designed the Mardi Gras production of Perfect Arrangement by Topher Payne.

== Patrick Kennedy Theatre Machine ==
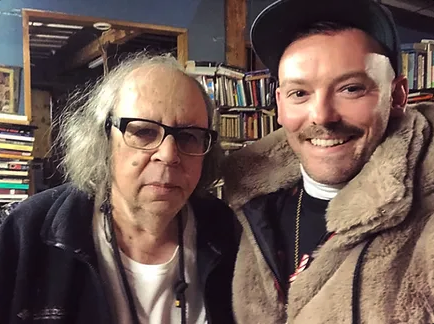
Patrick Kennedy with Richard Foreman

Patrick Kennedy Theatre Machine is a theatre company founded on January 14, 2018, by Patrick Kennedy. The theater is known for producing experimental stage works. Under Kennedy’s artistic direction, its productions draw on a range of influences, including vaudeville, philosophy, slapstick comedy, Dadaism, and surrealism.

A statement from Patrick Kennedy said, "50 years after Richard Foreman founded his Ontological-Hysteric Theater, I thought it critical that we answer the need for a new avant garde theatre company which continues Richard's work in the exploration of consciousness. This is especially important given the perilous social, economic and political times we live in."

== Sydney Fringe ==
Kennedy was appointed as the Chief Executive of Sydney Fringe in July 2025.

== Credits ==
- 2026: Paradise Hotel by Richard Foreman (KXT On Broadway, Sydney)
- 2026: Perfect Arrangement by Topher Payne (New Theatre, Sydney)
- 2025: The Flea (New Theatre, Sydney)
- 2025: Did You Mean To Fall Like That? (KXT On Broadway, Sydney)
- 2024: Sophia=(Wisdom) Part 3: The Cliffs by Richard Foreman (New Theatre, Sydney)
- 2019: Halbwelt Kultur (The Other Palace, London)
- 2019: Zomboid! by Richard Foreman (New Wimbledon Theatre, London)
- 2019: Lava by Richard Foreman (New Wimbledon Theatre, London)
- 2019: Pain(t) by Richard Foreman (New Wimbledon Theatre, London)
- 2018: Elephant Steps by Richard Foreman and Stanley Silverman (Arcola Theatre, London)
- 2017: King Cowboy Rufus Rules The Universe! by Richard Foreman (London Theatre Workshop, London)
- 2016: Hotel For Criminals by Richard Foreman and Stanley Silverman (New Wimbledon Theatre, London)
- 2016: Fantastic Medicine (Workshop)
- 2016: Starman: A Celebration Of David Bowie (Union Chapel, London)
- 2014: The Cherry Orchard (New Wimbledon Theatre, London)
- 2014: Up From Paradise by Arthur Miller and Stanley Silverman (New Wimbledon Theatre, London)
- 2014: Celebrating Silverman (Hippodrome, London)
- 2014: Doctor Selavy's Magic Theatre by Stanley Silverman and by Richard Foreman (New Wimbledon Theatre, London)
- 2013: If It Only Even Runs A Minute (Hippodrome, London)
- 2013: Halbwelt Kultur (Jermyn Street Theatre, London)
- 2012: Halbwelt Kultur (Churchill Theatre, London)
- 2012: The Cherry Orchard
- 2011: Marat/Sade (AE Harris Warehouse, Birmingham)
- 2010: The Laramie Project (The Amos, Birmingham)
- 2010: Antony and Cleopatra (The Underground, Birmingham)
- 2009: Who's Afraid of Virginia Woolf? (The Amos, Birmingham)
- 2009: The Lesson (Edinburgh Fringe Festival)
- 2008: What The Butler Saw (Custard Factory, Birmingham)
- 2008: Therese Raquin (The Mandela, Birmingham)

== Awards ==
- 2019 Offie nomination for IDEA Production, ZOMBOID!
