= Rhoda in Potatoland =

Ontological-Hysteric Theater play by Richard Foreman

Rhoda in Potatoland (Her Fall-starts) is an Ontological-Hysteric Theater play by Richard Foreman. It premiered in 1976, at 491 Broadway in New York. It ran from December 1975 until February 1976 and starred Kate Manheim as Rhoda and Bob Fleischner as Max. The play is insistently aimed at reshaping spectators' perceptions by focusing on form and structure. Foreman created a perceptually challenging environment that forces the audience to participate actively in constructing their experience of theater, especially since the visuals and the text are challenging to follow.

The play received Obie Awards for performance by Kate Manheim and best theater piece in 1976.

== Plot ==
The play consists of a single act. It starts with Rhoda having visions. The visions are sexual and bizarre; they include potatoes, dances and nightmares. Rhoda meets friends, strangers and a lover in these dreams. The play starts as a regular conversation between Rhoda and her friend Sophia, and Max who becomes Rhoda's lover enters sitting on a throne, and that is when Rhoda's dreams begin, going through salons, bathrooms and woods. It all ends with her being punished for dreaming.

== Setting ==
Sitting on bleachers, the audience is inside a shadow box. The walls are black and rigged with devices and picture frames, sliding platforms, a topsy-turvy bed. Interstices string cat-cradles the stage space. A table is placed on a hill at a precarious tilt. On the horizon is large shoe and a teeny bot. The setting of the play switches between reality and dreams. It starts with Rhoda and Sophia in a cafe, while Max suddenly appears sitting on a throne, then switches into a bedroom where Hannah joins them briefly. Then as potatoes they appear in a field trying to write a letter while Eleanor joins them. We suddenly switch to a shoe salon where Rhoda, a salesman and Sophia argue. The characters then enter the woods with Agatha, a room where tea is served, a cafe where Max and Hannah talk, Max on a throne, Rhoda in a bathroom having a nightmare dance, and finally a room with a table where Rhoda is punished for dreaming.

== Characters and cast ==
- Rhoda – Kate Manheim (protagonist who experiences dreams)
- Max – Bob Fleischner (Rhoda's lover)
- Sophia – Rena Gill (Rhoda’s friend)
- Waiter – Gautam Dasgupta
- Admirer – John Matturri
- Hannah – Ela Troyano
- Eleanor – Camille Foss
- Agatha – Cathy Scott
- Crew – Tim Kennedy, Phillip Johnston and Charley Bergengren

== Interpretation ==
Foreman's play is considered ontological because of its obsession with questions of human consciousness and being, and hysteric because it also deals with a more surrealist world of dreams, sexual desire, and anxieties. In the play both Max and Rhoda represent Foreman's consciousness and fears. Rhoda, in particular, represents Foreman grappling with the nature of sexuality.

== Reception ==
The play had mixed reviews. Rockwell from The New York Times said "This won’t be the year that Richard Foreman comes entirely out of the avant-garde closet: he's too busy in there, creating theatre that fascinates a small if articulate audience, but will it be the year that more and more people encounter him on the outside, and maybe go into his closet themselves". On the other hand, Eric Bogosian thought, "Only minutes of any particular production seemed alive. I longed for intensity, fun, manic energy, insanity, brains; 'performers' instead of 'actors'. I wanted theatre that was more than the sum of its parts". He later added that the play, "turned my artistic world upside down," and "changed my life forever."

== General references ==
- Foreman, Richard, & Davy, K. (2007). Rhoda in Potatoland. Twentieth-Century Drama Full-Text Database. Cambridge [England], Proquest LLC.
- Rabkin, Gerald. Richard Foreman. Baltimore. Johns Hopkins University Press, 1999.
- Davy, Kate. Richard Foreman and the Ontological-Hysteric Theatre. Ann Arbor, Mich. : UMI Research Press, c1981.
- Foreman, Richard, 1937– Plays and manifestos. New York, New York University Press, 1976.
- Foreman, Richard. Unbalancing acts "foundations for a theater"; edited by Ken Jordan; foreword by Peter Sellars. New York : Pantheon Books, c1992.
- Foreman, Richard. Bad boy Nietzsche and other plays. New York Theatre Communications Group; St. Paul, MN : Distributed to the Book trade by Consortium Book Sales and Distribution, 2007.
- Weideli, Walter. The art of Bertolt Brecht. English version by Daniel Russell. New York University Press, 1963.
- Ewen, Frederic, 1899–1988. Bertolt Brecht; his life, his art, and his times. New York, Citadel Press, 1967
