= Mac Wellman =

American dramatist (born 1945)

- Born: March 7, 1945 (age 81); Cleveland, Ohio, United States
- Occupations: Playwright, author, poet, educator
- Writing career
- Genre: Experimental

John McDowell Wellman (born March 7, 1945), is an American playwright, author, and poet. He is best known for his experimental work in the theater which rebels against theatrical conventions, often abandoning such traditional elements as plot and character altogether. In 1990, he received an Obie Award for Best New American Play (for Bad Penny, Terminal Hip, and Crowbar). In 1991, he received another Obie Award for Sincerity Forever. He has received a Lila Wallace-Reader's Digest Writers Award, and the 2003 Obie Award for Lifetime Achievement, as well as the Foundation for Contemporary Arts Grants to Artists award (2003).

== Personal development ==
In 1967 Wellman earned a Bachelor of Arts in International Relations at the American University, marrying his first wife, Nancy Roesch, the same year. Moving to the University of Wisconsin, he earned a master's degree in English focusing on poetry. After teaching several years, he sought professional renewal by touring Europe. In The Netherlands, Wellman began a collaboration with Annemarie Prins, a Dutch theatrical director/producer whom he had first met during his junior year in college, creating radio plays. In 1975 they directed a stage production, Fama Combinatoria, at Theatre de Brakke Grand in Amsterdam.

During the late seventies Wellman moved to New York City and married a Dutch journalist, Yolanda Gerritsen. Wellman continued writing poetry and plays, and in 1977 published a collection of poetry, In Praise of Secrecy, while in 1979 his play, Starluster was produced in New York.

== Writings ==
Wellman's plays frequently resemble a moving collage of events which has more in common with an avant-garde dance production than Broadway-style theater. Wellman has stated, "More and more I think all theater is site-specific. When plays work, they work in the space." Helen Shaw wrote, "Since a 1984 essay, 'The Theatre of Good Intentions', [Wellman] has been the cynosure in a heaven full of experimental playwrights who rail against what Jonathan Lear, in his book Open Minded, called a 'tyranny' of 'the already known'."

Discussing his style with BOMB Magazine, Wellman said that he uses words as objects in his writing. "I found if you try to write totally in cliches and things that don't sound right," Wellman clarified, "you deal with a language that frankly is 98% of what people speak, think, and hear. So it's enormously enjoyable." This type of language has been positively characterized as "an untrammeled flow of logorrhea: plain words, fancy words, space-age words, Victorian words and words that defy the dictionary" by The New York Times reviewer Ben Brantley. In terms of production, Wellman experiments with stage direction. Some directions are spoken and others are not, blurring the line between action and direction. Wellman notes, "That's something I'm really interested in. I like it when people talk about what's going on in a play. Sometimes it's more interesting than trying to enact everything."

== Professional credits ==
Wellman is the I. Fine Professor of Play Writing at Brooklyn College, New York City, and in 2010 he became a CUNY Distinguished Professor. Wellman is author of more than forty plays, including:

- Harm's Way (1978)
- The Self-Begotten (1982)
- The Bad Infinity (1983)
- Terminal Hip (1984)
- Dracula (1987)
- Whirligig (1988)
- Crowbar (1989)
- 7 Blowjobs (1991)
- Murder of Crows (1992)
- Second-Hand Smoke (1997)
- Description Beggared or the Allegory of WHITENESS (2000)
- Jennie Richee (2001)

In addition to several collaborations with composer/percussionist David Van Tieghem in the 1990s, he collaborated with Bang on a Can composer David Lang in 2006 on the opera The Difficulty of Crossing a Field, adapted from a very short story by Ambrose Bierce. He has received grants from the National Endowment for the Arts, New York Foundation for the Arts, the Rockefeller Foundation, the McKnight Foundation and a Guggenheim Fellowship. In 1990, he received an Obie Award for Best New American Play (for Bad Penny, Terminal Hip, and Crowbar). In 1991, he received another Obie Award for Sincerity Forever. He has received a Lila Wallace-Reader's Digest Writers Award, and most recently the 2003 Obie Award for Lifetime Achievement, as well as the Foundation for Contemporary Arts Grants to Artists award (2003). He is a co-founder of The Flea Theater in New York City.

== Bibliography ==
- Appler, Keith (2010). "Mac Wellman and the Language Poets: Chaos Writing and the General Economy of Language". Journal of Dramatic Theory and Criticism. 24 (2): 69–90. doi:10.1353/dtc.2010.0007. S2CID 161778658.
- Erickson, Jon (Fall 1998). "The Mise en Scène of the Non-Euclidean Character: Wellman, Jenkin and Strindberg". Modern Drama. 41 (3): 355–370. doi:10.1353/mdr.1998.0066.
- Masterman, Glynn (2009). Perpendicular to the Aristotelian: The Speculations of Mac Wellman. Los Angeles: Three Pigeons Publishing.
- Munk, Erika. "The Difficulty of Defending a Form: David Lang and Mac Wellman, Interviewed by Erika Munk." Theater 32.2 (Summer 2002), 56–61.
- Shaw, Helen. "Mac Wellman and Things of the Devil." The Difficulty of Crossing a Field. Minneapolis: University of Minnesota Press, 2008. vii–xii.
- Simpson, Jim, artistic dir. Mac Wellman, co-founder. The Flea Theater.
- Wellman, Mac. "A Chrestomathy of 22 Answers to 22 Wholly Unaskable and Unrelated Questions Concerning Political and Poetic Theater." Cellophane: Plays by Mac Wellman. Baltimore: Johns Hopkins University Press, 2001. 1–16.
- Speculations: An Essay on the Theater. January 20, 2009.
- Speculations: An Essay on the Theater (abridged version). The Difficulty of Crossing a Field. Minneapolis: University of Minnesota Press, 2008. 293–342.
- The Bad Infinity: Eight Plays by Mac Wellman. Baltimore: Johns Hopkins University Press, 1994.
- The Difficulty of Crossing a Field: Nine New Plays. Minneapolis: University of Minnesota Press, 2008.
- "The Theatre of Good Intentions." Performing Arts Journal 8.3 (1984), 59–70.

== See also ==
- Speculations: An Essay on the Theater
- The Flea Theater
- Performance art
- Performing Garage
- Elizabeth LeCompte
- The Wooster Group
- Ontological-Hysteric Theater
- Richard Foreman
- Richard Schechner
- Happenings
- Allan Kaprow
- Fluxus
- Intermedia
- Dick Higgins
- Marina Abramović
- Experimental theatre
- Avant-garde
