= Speculations: An Essay on the Theater =

"Speculations: An Essay on the Theater" is a treatise by experimental playwright Mac Wellman. It was published with the collection of plays entitled The Difficulty of Crossing a Field (University of Minnesota Press, 2008). It is also available, with additional material not included in the book, on Wellman's website (see link below).

The treatise is written in an eccentric style which, at times, reads like a series of aphorisms. Nevertheless, in its totality it presents a vision for contemporary theater which is both cohesive and profound, and which constitutes a radical departure from the Aristotelian paradigm that dominates mainstream theater today, where plot and character are central to the drama. As such, Speculations constitutes a critique of mainstream theater, but it also offers alternatives. It looks at the nature of time and space; the transfer of energy between people, places, and things; the unlimited potential inherent in the present moment; the subjective nature of experience; and discusses the implications of these things for the way we do theater. In the course of his discussion, Wellman alludes to scientific developments which have influenced his understanding of the creative process, such as relativity, chaos theory, and fractal theory. He also makes connections between experimental theater and religious ceremony, both of which seek to plumb the depths of human potential in search of “epiphanies” -- moments of personal revelation or insight which are, for Wellman, the highest object of the theatrical experience.

Wellman has received extensive recognition for his work over the last thirty years, including grants from the National Endowment for the Arts and three Obies (Off-Broadway Theater Awards), the most recent of which was a Lifetime Achievement Award in 2003.

== Bibliography ==
- Erickson, Jon. “The Mise en Scène of the Non-Euclidean Character: Wellman, Jenkin and Strindberg.” Modern Drama 41.3 (Fall 1998).
- Masterman, Glynn. Perpendicular to the Aristotelian: The Speculations of Mac Wellman. Los Angeles: Three Pigeons Publishing, 2009.
- Munk, Erika. “The Difficulty of Defending a Form: David Lang and Mac Wellman, Interviewed by Erika Munk.” Theater 32.2 (Summer 2002), 56-61.
- Shaw, Helen. “Mac Wellman and Things of the Devil.” The Difficulty of Crossing a Field. Minneapolis: University of Minnesota Press, 2008. vii-xii.
- Simpson, Jim, artistic dir. Mac Wellman, co-founder. The Flea Theater. <www.theflea.org>.
- Wellman, Mac. “A Chrestomathy of 22 Answers to 22 Wholly Unaskable and Unrelated Questions Concerning Political and Poetic Theater.” Cellophane: Plays by Mac Wellman. Baltimore: Johns Hopkins University Press, 2001. 1-16.
- --- Speculations: An Essay on the Theater. Jan. 20, 2009, <www.macwellman.com/images/speculations13.pdf>.
- --- “Speculations: An Essay on the Theater” (abridged version). The Difficulty of Crossing a Field. Minneapolis: University of Minnesota Press, 2008. 293-342.
- --- The Bad Infinity: Eight Plays by Mac Wellman. Baltimore: Johns Hopkins University Press, 1994.
- --- The Difficulty of Crossing a Field: Nine New Plays. Minneapolis: University of Minnesota Press, 2008.
- --- “The Theatre of Good Intentions.” Performing Arts Journal 8.3 (1984), 59-70.

== See also ==
- Mac Wellman
- The Flea Theater
- Performance art
- Performing Garage
- Elizabeth LeCompte
- The Wooster Group
- Ontological-Hysteric Theater
- Richard Foreman
- Richard Schechner
- Happenings
- Allan Kaprow
- Fluxus
- Intermedia
- Dick Higgins
- Marina Abramović
- Experimental theatre
- Avant-garde
