= The Flea Theater =

Theater in Manhattan, New York

Coordinates: 40°42′58″N 74°00′21″W

- Formation: 1996
- Founder: Jim Simpson, Sigourney Weaver, Mac Wellman, and Kyle Chepulis
- Type: Theatre group
- Location: New York City
- Artistic director: Niegel Smith
- Website: theflea.org
The Flea Theater
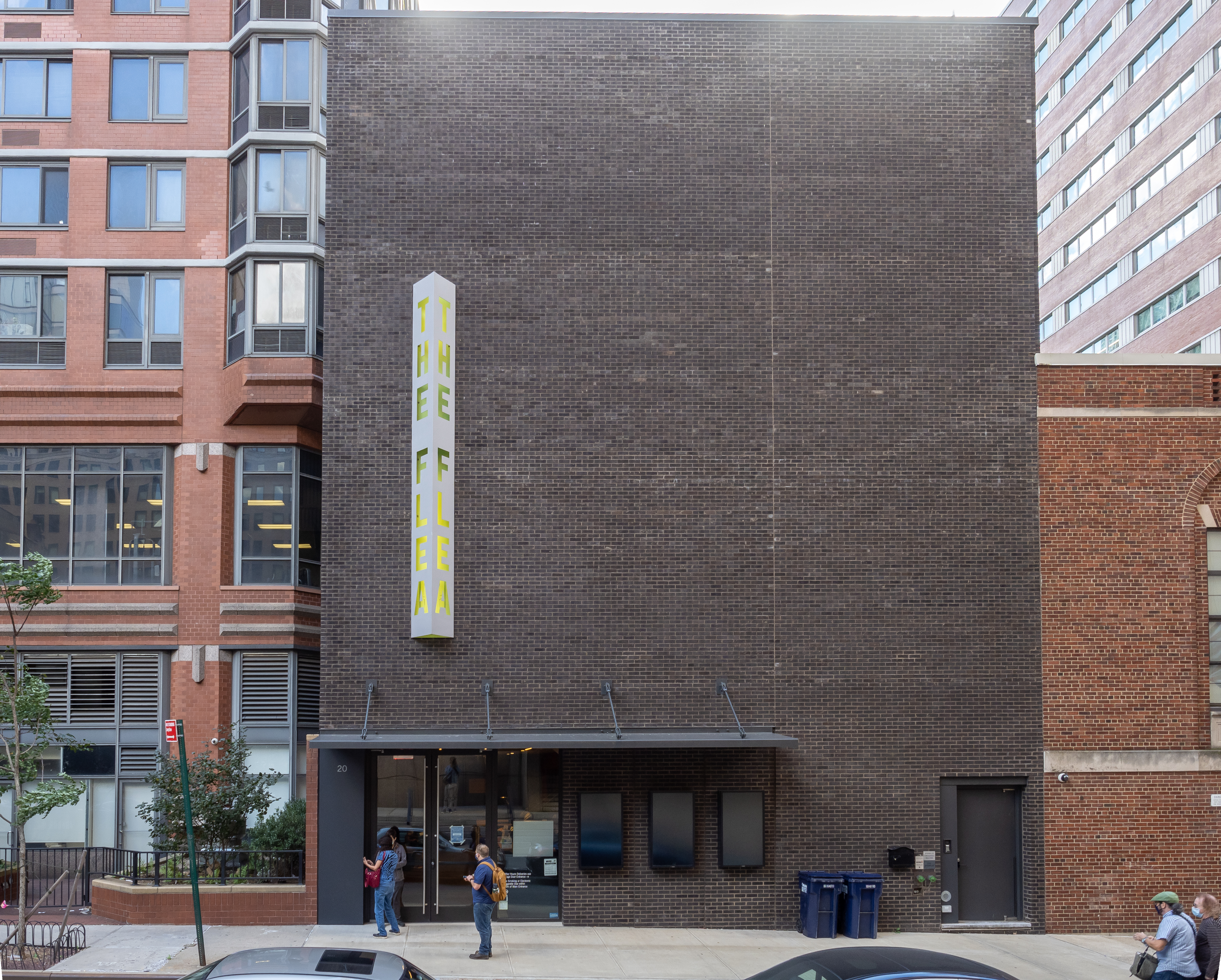
- Current Theater at 20 Thomas Street in Tribeca
- Address: 20 Thomas Street; New York City
- Capacity: The Sam: 106; The Pete: 74; The Siggy: 46
- Public transit: Chambers Street–World Trade Center/Park Place/Cortlandt Street station Canal Street station City Hall station
Construction
- Opened: 2017

The Flea Theater is a theater in the TriBeCa neighborhood of Manhattan in New York City, New York, U.S. It presents primarily experimental theatre by Black, brown, and queer artists, as well as a venue for film stars to act on a 74-seat stage. The theater was founded in 1996 by Jim Simpson, Sigourney Weaver, Mac Wellman, and Kyle Chepulis. The Flea earned early acclaim for original productions of post-9/11 play The Guys and political works by A. R. Gurney. According to The New York Times, "Since its inception in 1996, The Flea has presented over 100 plays and numerous dance and live music performances. Under Artistic Director Jim Simpson and Producing Director Carol Ostrow, The Flea is one of New York's leading off-off-Broadway companies."

== History ==
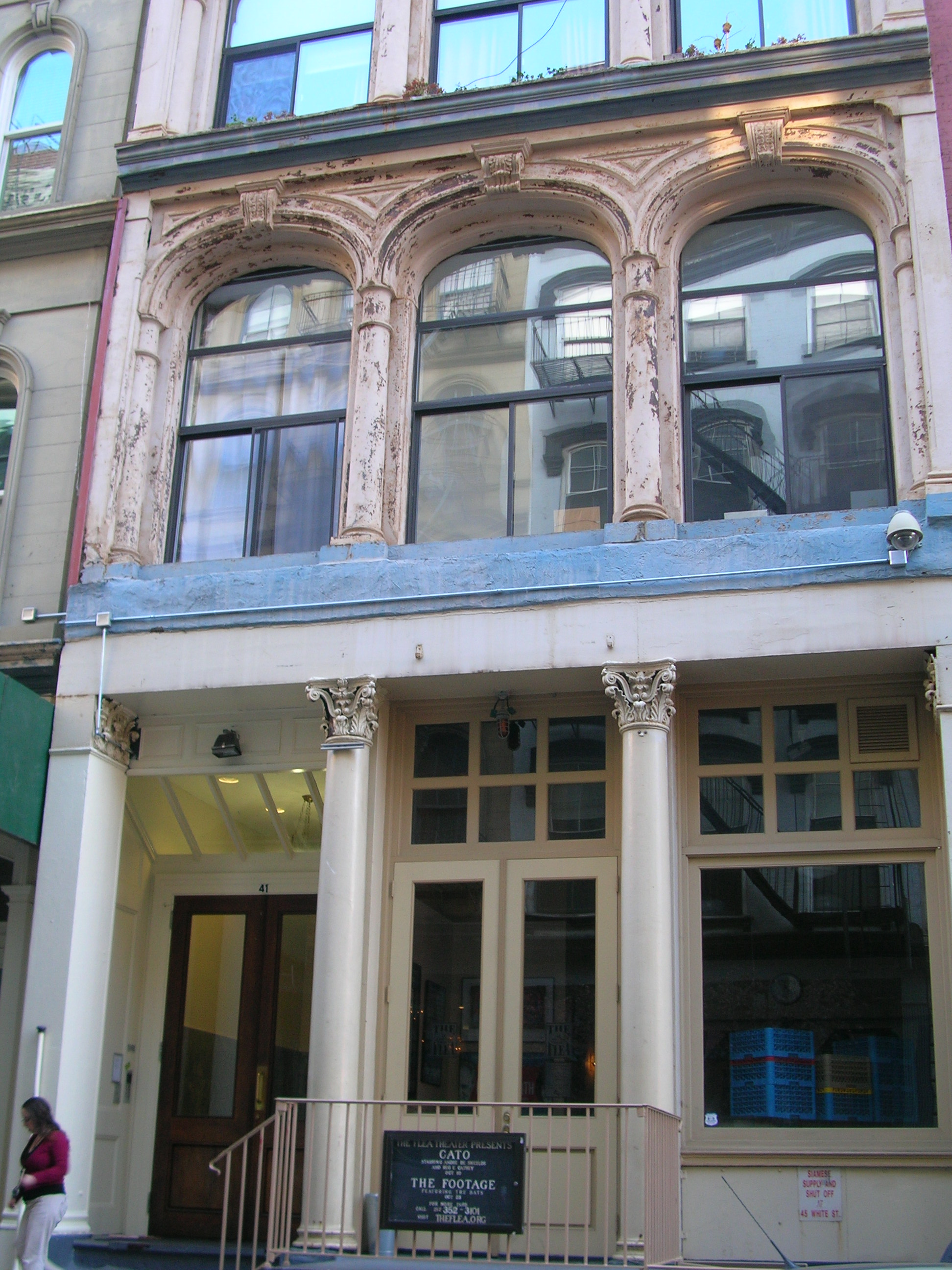
The Flea Theater's original space at 41 White Street in Tribeca.

Founded in 1996, the award-winning Flea Theater was originally formed to create, according to the theatre's website, “a joyful hell in a small space”. The Flea receives over 17,000 visitors each year. In March 2015, The Flea announced that Niegel Smith would be taking over for Jim Simpson as its new artistic director.

Production highlights include The Guys by Anne Nelson, starring Sigourney Weaver and Bill Murray. Additional productions include Oh the Humanity and Other Exclamations, by Pulitzer finalist Will Eno, starring Marisa Tomei and Brian Hutchison. This collection of five short plays extended through winter 2008. Another recent Flea hit was Mrs. Farnsworth, a political comedy written for The Flea by renowned playwright A. R. Gurney, which was performed by Sigourney Weaver and John Lithgow. Mrs. Farnsworth won rave reviews and returned to The Flea for an encore in the fall. For two years in a row, The New York Times named a Flea production as one of the best Off-Broadway shows of the season—O Jerusalem in 2003 and Mrs. Farnsworth in 2004. Recent productions include The Great Recession: six plays commissioned by The Flea exploring the impact of the current economic crisis on the younger generation written by Thomas Bradshaw, Sheila Callaghan, Erin Courtney, Will Eno, Itamar Moses and Adam Rapp; Jonathan Reynolds's Girls in Trouble; and Bathsheba Doran's Parents’ Evening.

In the early 2020s, the Flea Theater underwent a substantive organizational reconfiguration in response to longstanding grievances within its artistic community. Dissatisfaction, notably surrounding unpaid labor and perceived mistreatment of Black artists, surfaced prominently in 2020 when actress Bryn Carter articulated concerns regarding elitism and racism within the institution. This catalyzed a transformative process culminating in the establishment of the Fled Collective, a group vocally critical of the extant Flea paradigm, which secured financial support to independently curate programming in the TriBeCa venue. Confronting fiscal challenges subsequent to the departure of key personnel, including Carol Ostrow, the Flea instituted a hybrid operational model, committing to remunerative practices for actors and a thematic emphasis on the works of "Black, brown, and queer artists." Founding artistic director Jim Simpson and Sigourney Weaver endorsed the transfer of control to the Fled Collective in a joint statement. Emphasizing the Fled Collective's earned merit, passion, and potential for a dynamic season, the couple criticized the dissolution of the Flea's programs. They underscored the historical contributions of young individuals and concluded with a resolute plea to "Give them the keys." The organization's revival commenced with the staging of Arden — But, Not Without You, reflecting a renewed artistic direction.

== New works ==
The Flea produces several original major productions each year. Flea artists have been honored with two OBIE Awards, an Otto Award and, in May 2004, The Flea was given a Drama Desk Award for Distinguished Achievement commending its dedication to adventurous theater.

== Awards and recognition ==
In 2010, The Flea was awarded the American Theatre Wing's National Theatre Company Grant.

== See also ==
- Sigourney Weaver
- Speculations: An Essay on the Theater
- Mac Wellman
- Performance art
- Performing Garage
- Elizabeth LeCompte
- The Wooster Group
- Ontological-Hysteric Theater
- Richard Foreman
- Richard Schechner
- Happenings
- Allan Kaprow
- Fluxus
- Intermedia
- Dick Higgins
- Marina Abramović
- Experimental theatre
- Avant-garde
