= Up from Paradise =

- Music: Stanley Silverman
- Lyrics: Arthur Miller
- Book: Arthur Miller
- Basis: Miller's play The Creation of the World and Other Business
- Productions: 1974 University of Michigan; 1981 New York City concert 1983 Off-Broadway; 2014 London

Up from Paradise is a musical with a book and lyrics by Arthur Miller and music by Stanley Silverman.

In 1972, Miller's comedy The Creation of the World and Other Business closed after only twenty performances. Undaunted by its failure, he revamped it as a musical, a retelling of God's battle with Lucifer for control of Adam and Eve as chronicled in the Book of Genesis.

Up from Paradise was staged at Miller's alma mater, the University of Michigan in Ann Arbor, in 1974. It was presented in concert form in the Composers' Showcase at the Whitney Museum in Manhattan in 1981. A fully staged off-Broadway production, directed by Ran Avni, opened on October 25, 1983 at the Jewish Repertory Theater. The cast included Len Cariou as God, Austin Pendleton as Adam, Alice Playten as Eve, Walter Bobbie as Lucifer, and Lonny Price as Abel.

The London premiere was staged at the New Wimbledon Theatre by PK Productions in July 2014. Directed by Patrick Kennedy, with music direction by Jake Dorfman, it opened on July 22 and the cast included Niccolo Curradi as God, Alexander Elwood as Adam, Susanna Squires as Eve, Alex Wingfield as Lucifer, Perry Brookes Jr as Abel and Anthony Pinnick as Cain.
