= The Creation of the World and Other Business =

1972 play by Arthur Miller

The Creation of the World and Other Business is a play by Arthur Miller first performed in 1972.

== Summary ==
The play is a parable that explores the theme of good-versus-evil by way of a comedic retelling of events in the Book of Genesis in the Bible. The first act is set in the Garden of Eden, where God creates Eve for Adam. God wants the couple to procreate, but doesn't know how to entice them into starting the process. Onto the scene comes Lucifer, who believes the existence of evil will make sex exciting, and he tempts the couple to eat the forbidden apple. God punishes Lucifer by tossing him into hell and punishes the couple by expelling them from paradise. In the second act, Eve gives birth to Cain. In the third act, Cain kills his brother Abel and is sent out as a wanderer.

== Productions ==
Miller's first work since The Price five years earlier, Creation stumbled along during rehearsals. Original director Harold Clurman and most of the cast, including Barbara Harris, Susan Batson and Hal Holbrook, were replaced, and the playwright rewrote most of the material. After 21 previews, the Broadway production, directed by Gerald Freedman, opened on November 30, 1972, at the Shubert Theatre, where it ran for 20 performances. The cast included Stephen Elliott as God, Bob Dishy as Adam, Zoe Caldwell as Eve, George Grizzard as Lucifer, Barry Primus as Cain, and Mark Lamos as Abel.

In 1973, Tangent Theatre, an amateur theatre company from Walsall, won the rights to perform the play at the Edinburgh Festival Fringe. It was a critical success and Don Nunes, the director accepted the award for best production that year from Esther Rantzen. Tangent Theatre grew out of the West Midlands College of Education Theatre Society and performed all over Britain and Europe between 1969 and 1974.

Miller reworked the play into a musical, Up From Paradise, which opened in 1974 at the University of Michigan in Ann Arbor.

In 2004, Citizens of the Universe's production of Creation of the World and Other Business was banned from playing at Greenville Technical College.

In 2014, the Theater Department at Orange Coast College put on a rock and roll jukebox musical version of the play.
