= Topher Payne =

American playwright and screenwriter

- Born: 1979 (age 46–47); Kosciusko, Mississippi, U.S.
- Occupations: Playwright, Screenwriter
- Spouse: Tommy Payne (2009-2014)
- Writing career
- Notable works: Perfect Arrangement, Angry Fags

Topher Payne (born 1979) is an American playwright and screenwriter based in Atlanta, Georgia. Two of his plays premiered in 2015: Perfect Arrangement, which premiered Off-Broadway and was produced by Primary Stages, and Angry Fags, which was produced at Chicago's Steppenwolf Theatre. Perfect Arrangement was awarded the M. Elizabeth Osborn Award for best new play by an emerging playwright by the American Theatre Critics Association in 2014. Since 2016, he has scripted five original films for The Hallmark Channel, including My Summer Prince and the Gift to Remember series.

== Early life ==
Payne was raised in Kosciusko, Mississippi, and attended the Idyllwild Arts Academy in California. He completed the tenth grade but dropped out to pursue a professional career. In an interview with ArtsATL, Payne explained, "I was a terrible student, unless it was something that I could see the end result from, and I could understand what the process was working toward and the benefit that I would receive from that—in that jerky way that teenagers think they know everything." He returned to Mississippi at age 17 and began working with New Stage Theatre in Jackson. "I had long arms and I wasn't afraid of heights and I became the electric intern. Then they had space with enough room to put in platforms. I asked for permission to put up one of my shows after the main stage show, and that worked."

== Career ==
Topher Payne relocated to Atlanta in 1999 and quickly became known for a "near-constant output of broadly appealing plays," building "a faithful core of local fans for his clever, zingy Southern comedies." He has premiered 13 full-length plays at Georgia theaters since 2009. He lists among his influences fellow Mississippi-native writers Ida Bell Wells, Eudora Welty, Beth Henley, and Richard Wright. His emphasis as a playwright is on comedy, believing that laughter is crucial for audience engagement. As he explained to Backstage Magazine in 2015, "If you can make someone laugh, they listen. And they lean in, and they want to hear more. And once you have that level of engagement, then you can start layering in a message that you want them to take away. You can do that in film. You can do that in a book. But the act of being in the same room with the storyteller is just fundamentally different. It lands differently."

In 2013, after being named Best Local Playwright for several consecutive years in a wide range of publications, including The Atlanta Journal-Constitution, Creative Loafing, The Sunday Paper, and The GA Voice, Payne's work began to be produced in other American cities. His play Perfect Arrangement premiered at the Source Festival in Washington DC, followed by productions in Louisville, Kentucky, Atlanta, and Anchorage, Alaska. In 2015, his play Angry Fags was produced by Pride Films and Plays at Steppenwolf Theatre in Chicago, and Perfect Arrangement made its début Off-Broadway, produced by Primary Stages. In a 2015 interview with WABE in Atlanta, director Shannon Eubanks described his writing: "Topher writes funny. And his rhythms, if you obey those rhythms, you get to a comedic payoff. But you also get to, if you honor them, to an internal emotional sense."

== Produced works ==
Plays (and original producer)

- Morningside (2017) at Georgia Ensemble Theatre
- Greetings Friend Your Kind Assistance Is Required (2017) at Georgia Ensemble Theatre
- Let Nothing You Dismay (2015) at Stage Door Players
- The Only Light in Reno (2014) at Georgia Ensemble Theatre
- Perfect Arrangement (2013) at The Source Festival
- Angry Fags (2013) at 7 Stages
- Swell Party (2013) at Georgia Ensemble Theatre
- Lakebottom Prime (2013) at Springer Opera House
- Evelyn in Purgatory (2012) at Essential Theatre
- Tokens of Affection (2011) at Georgia Ensemble Theatre
- Lakebottom Proper (2011) at Springer Opera House
- Christina Darling (2010) at Process Theatre
- Above the Fold and Don't Look at the Fat Lady (2009) at Process Theatre
- The Medicine Showdown (with Adam Koplan; 2009) at Flying Carpet Theatre
- The Attala County Garden Club (2006) at OnStage Atlanta
- Relations Unknown (2005) at Process Theatre
- Beached Wails (2002) at Atlanta Classical Theatre

Television

- Cherished Memories: A Gift to Remember 2 (2019)
- Rome in Love (2019)
- A Gift to Remember (2017)
- Broadcasting Christmas (2016)
- My Summer Prince (2016)

== Other works ==
- Funny Story: The Incomplete Works of Topher Payne an audiobook of collected works
- Necessary Luxuries: Notes on a Semi-Fabulous Life a collection of his columns from David Magazine

== Awards and honors ==
- The Georgia Theatre Hall of Fame (2018)
- The Gene-Gabriel Moore Playwriting Award: Greetings Friend Your Kind Assistance Is Required (2017)
- Lambda Literary Award Finalist, LGBTQ Drama: Perfect Arrangement (2017)
- The Suzi Bass Award, Outstanding World Premiere: Let Nothing You Dismay (2016)
- The Gene-Gabriel Moore Playwriting Award: Perfect Arrangement (2015)
- Metro Atlanta Theatre Award, Best Play: Perfect Arrangement (2015)
- American Theatre Critics Association M. Elizabeth Osborn Award: Perfect Arrangement (2014)
- Honorable Mention, Arch & Bruce Brown Foundation: Perfect Arrangement (2013)
- The Gene-Gabriel Moore Playwriting Award: Angry Fags (2013)
- Essential Theatre Playwriting Award: Evelyn in Purgatory (2012)
- Grand Marshal, Atlanta Pride Parade (2011)
- Metro Atlanta Theatre Award, Best Original Work: Above the Fold (2009)

== Personal life ==
Payne served as Grand Marshal of the Atlanta Pride parade in 2011. Payne married his husband, Tommy, in a 2009 ceremony in Massachusetts. The couple announced their separation in 2014. In a column for The GA Voice, Payne wrote about the challenge of ending a marriage in a state where the union was not legally recognized: "Despite what the State of Georgia may claim, this has been a real marriage in every possible sense...Divorce is the ugly element of the marriage equality conversation. We're far more hesitant to discuss it—I know I certainly was. It's embarrassing. It sounds like failure. We fear it will somehow weaken our argument if we acknowledge same-sex couples will be contributing to America's divorce statistics."
