= Flex space =

American term for flexible workspaces

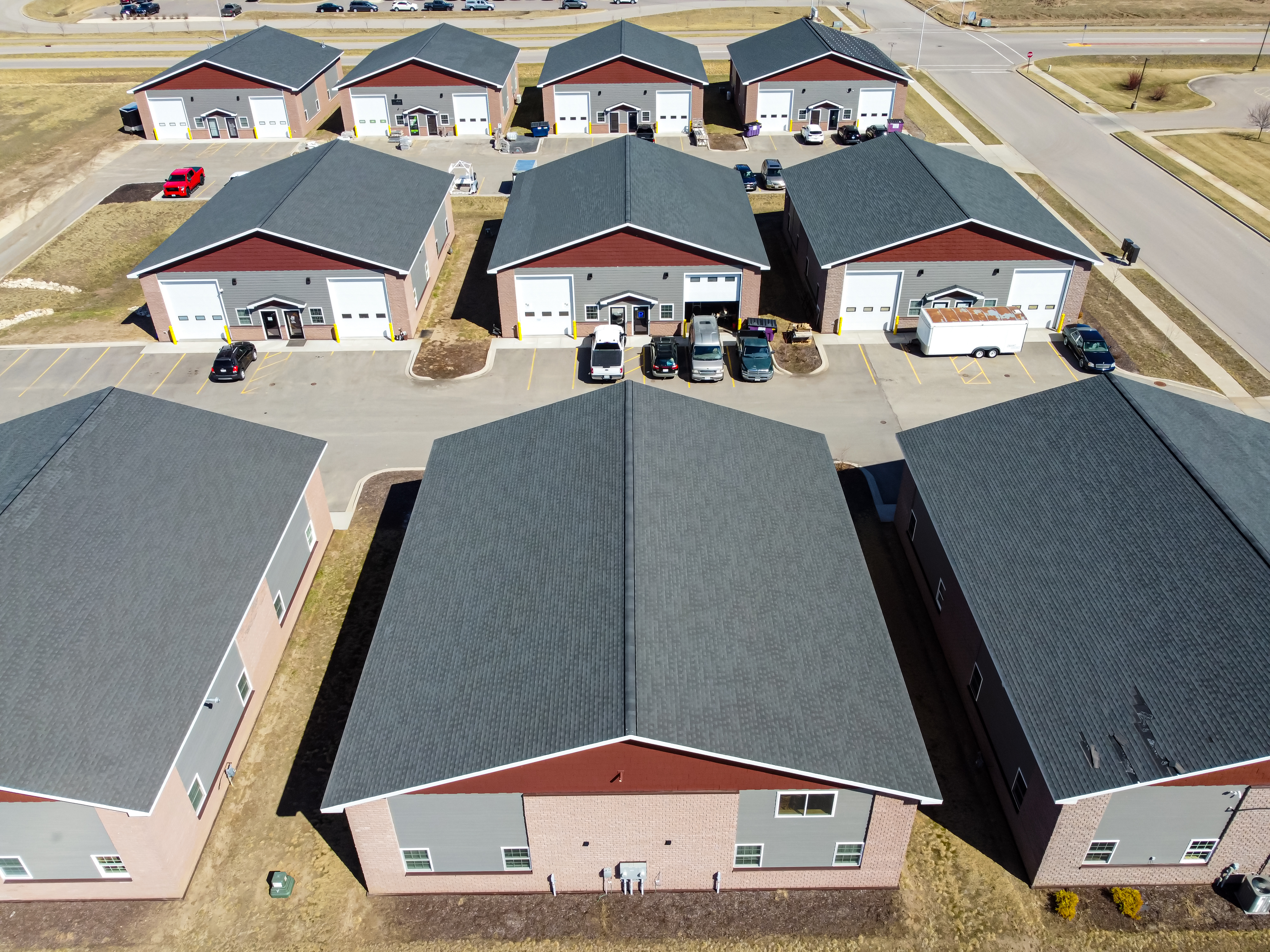
Flex spaces with large sectional garage doors and a service door enterence

Flex space is a term used for lightly zoned buildings. It is mainly used when referring to industrial or office space. They typically feature open, adaptable interiors with concrete slab floors, large overhead doors, with direct vehicle or loading access.

== History ==
Flex space evolved from light industrial warehouses being converted to office space. Businesses that generally occupy these are new dot-com companies, mechanic shops, machine shops, woodshops and companies that contract plumbing, pest, electrical, and sometimes churches and related services.

Companies have discovered that on any given work day, a large percentage of their cubes are unoccupied—in some cases, up to 50%. Employees travel for work, take vacation, or are working from home in greater numbers than ever before. To avoid having to lease or buy more office space, flex space allows a company to have a higher occupancy of cube space and less wasted work areas.

At the beginning of the work day, an employee shows up at work. Cubes are mostly configured in the same way, making them all the same. The employee chooses a cube where they would like to sit, and that is their cube for the day. At the end of the day, they pack up their belongings, either taking them all home with them or storing them in a locker space. This leaves the cube the same way it was when they came in, and leaves it free and open for someone to use the following day. A large concern with employees in a flex space environment is cleanliness. It is important in a flex space environment to have a strong cleaning staff.
