= New Wimbledon Theatre =

Theatre in London, England

- Wimbledon Theatre
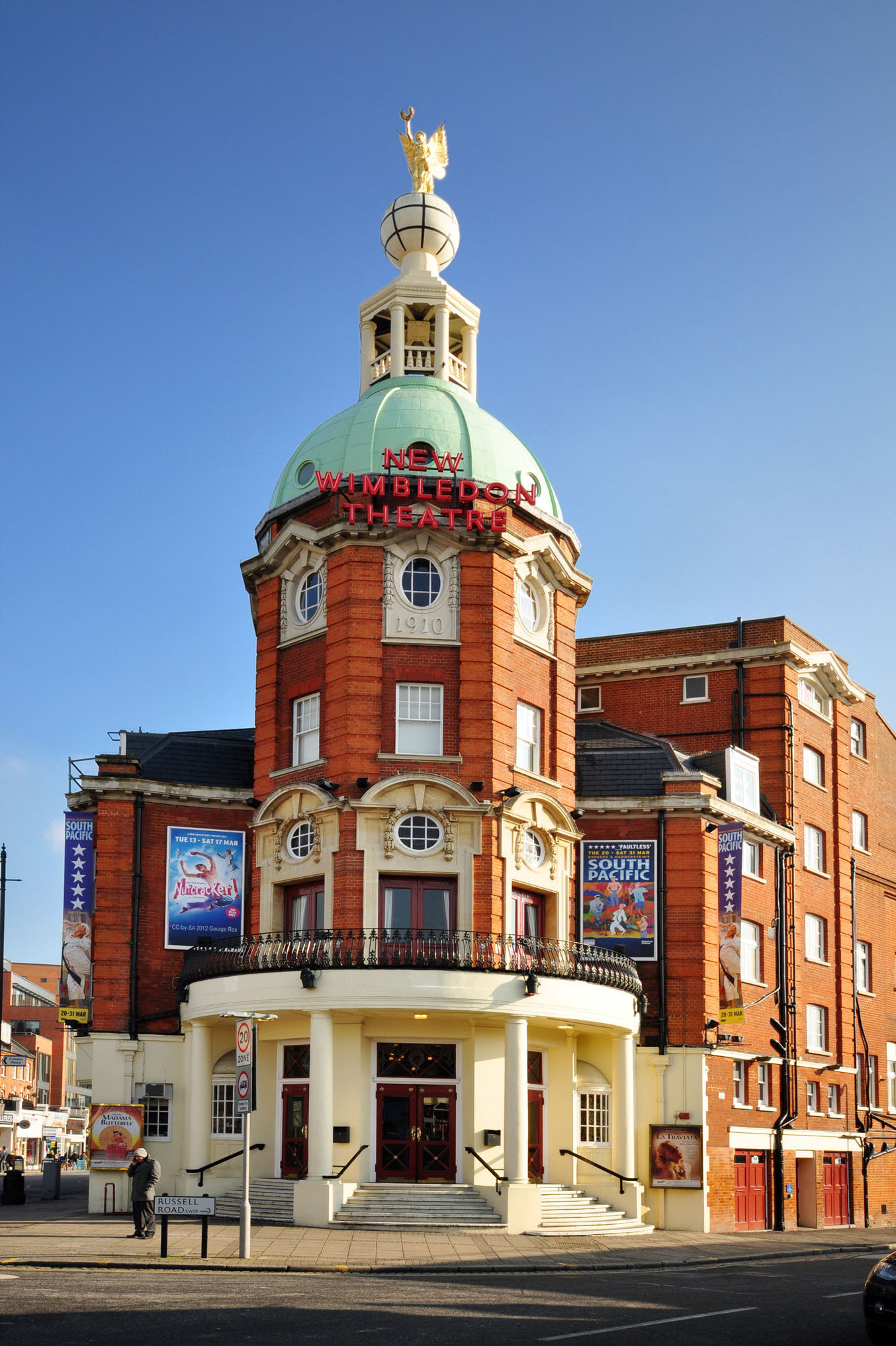
- New Wimbledon Theatre
- Interactive map of New Wimbledon Theatre
- Location: Wimbledon; London, SW19; United Kingdom
- Coordinates: 51.41937°N 0.20165°W
- Owner: Ambassador Theatre Group
- Capacity: 1,670 seats on 3 levels (main house); 80 seats (studio)
- Type: Proscenium arch
- Designation: Grade II listed
- Production: Touring productions
- Public transit: Wimbledon

Construction
- Opened: 1910; 116 years ago
- Architects: Cecil Massey and Roy Young

Website
- Ambassador Theatre Group

The New Wimbledon Theatre is situated on the Broadway, Wimbledon, London, in the London Borough of Merton. It is a Grade II listed Edwardian theatre built by the theatre lover and entrepreneur, J. B. Mulholland, who at the time was also owner of the King's Theatre in Hammersmith and had owned the Theatre Metropole in Camberwell in the 1890's. Built on the site of a large house with spacious grounds, the theatre was designed by Cecil Aubrey Massey and Roy Young (possibly following a 1908 design by Frank H. Jones). It seems to have been the only British theatre to have included a Victorian-style Turkish bath in the basement. The theatre opened on 26 December 1910 with the pantomime Jack and Jill.

The theatre was very popular between the wars, with Gracie Fields, Sybil Thorndike, Ivor Novello, Markova, and Noël Coward all performing there. Lionel Bart's Oliver! received its world premiere at the theatre in 1960 before transferring to the West End's New Theatre. The theatre also hosted the world premiere of Half a Sixpence starring Tommy Steele in 1963 prior to the West End.

With several refurbishments, most notably in 1991 and 1998, the theatre retains its baroque and Adamesque internal features. The golden statue atop the dome is Laetitia, the Roman Goddess of Gaiety (although many refer to her as the theatre's "angel") and was an original fixture back in 1910. Laetitia is holding a laurel crown as a symbol of celebration. The statue was removed in World War II as it was thought to be a direction finding device for German bombers, and replaced in 1991.

The theatre is close to Wimbledon rail, tube, and tramlink station, and a short walk from South Wimbledon tube station.

== Venue statistics ==
The theatre has approximately 1,670 seats across three levels, making it the eighth largest theatre in London following the Royal Opera House, Covent Garden, the English National Opera's London Coliseum, and the major musical venues the London Palladium, Apollo Victoria, Drury Lane, Dominion, and Lyceum.

== Wimbledon Studio ==
The main auditorium is adjoined by the smaller black box space of the Time and Leisure Studio, a flexible space seating up to 80 people. It is often home to small drama and comedy productions, often prior to West End or Edinburgh Festival runs each summer. Up From Paradise, the only musical written by Arthur Miller, directed by Patrick Kennedy received its London premiere at the Studio in July 2014 following a successful year of musical programming.

== Recent history ==
Until 2001, the theatre was owned and operated by the Wimbledon Civic Theatre Trust, on behalf of the London Borough of Merton, who still own the freehold of the building. The trust was responsible for overseeing a multimillion-pound refurbishment in the late 1990s, incorporating a brand new backstage area, fly tower, and a complete re-seating of the orchestra stalls as well as redecoration of the interior. During this period, the theatre was closed for an entire year.

The venue fell into severe financial difficulties in 2003 and was forced to close. Following lengthy talks between leading producers, local councillors, and companies, in autumn 2003 a deal was agreed for the theatre to be managed by the Ambassador Theatre Group (ATG).

Following a name change to the New Wimbledon Theatre, the venue reopened in February 2004 with Matthew Bourne's production of The Nutcracker followed by a season of touring musicals, dance, and ballet, culminating in the London revival of Andrew Lloyd Webber's Cats.

In November 2005, the theatre saw the launch of a new UK pantomime company, First Family Entertainment with their flagship production being Cinderella starring Susan Hampshire, Richard Wilson, John Barrowman, Naomi Wilkinson, Peter Duncan, and Tim Vine. In 2006, the theatre welcomed its first Hollywood star in the shape of Happy Days' Henry Winkler. Subsequent Christmases have seen global stars including Pamela Anderson, Warwick Davis, Edna Everage, Linda Gray, David Hasselhoff, Priscilla Presley, Jerry Springer, and Ruby Wax, alongside British household names including Brian Blessed, Jo Brand, Bobby Davro, Anita Dobson, Gareth Gates, Ross Kemp, Alistair McGowan, Paul O'Grady, Joanna Page, Wayne Sleep, Louie Spence, Claire Sweeney, and Tim Vine.

The theatre has since played host to a large variety of major touring productions, plus the UK launch of Josef Weinberger's UK collection of Disney musicals available to amateur companies throughout the British Isles. In 2010, the national tour of Spamalot, the musical based on the film Monty Python and the Holy Grail, opened at the New Wimbledon. In September, 2024, War Horse (play)

=== Television usage ===
The venue is frequently hired out for television production, with many television series having been shot at the location, including The Optimist, The Bill, The IT Crowd, De-Lovely, Little Britain, Extras (the Aladdin pantomime episode with Les Dennis), Jonathan Creek and We Are Most Amused, a comedy gala performance to celebrate the 60th birthday of The Prince of Wales, in aid of The Prince's Trust.

Enn Reitel and Karen Smith on stage at the New Wimbledon Theatre, filming an episode of The Optimist (1984)

Notably, the venue was the home of annual televised Christmas pantomimes, including:

- Aladdin (BBC 1971) – starring Cilla Black, Alfred Marks, Roy Castle, and Norman Vaughan
- Dick Whittington and His Cat (BBC 1972) – starring Dick Emery, Peter Noone, Michael Aspel, Gemma Craven, Robert Dorning, and Stratford Johns
- Robin Hood (BBC 1973) – starring Terry Scott, Hugh Lloyd, Anita Harris, Billy Dainty, Dana, Freddie Davies, and Alan Curtis
- Aladdin (ITV 2000) – starring Ed Byrne, Patsy Kensit, John Savident, Roger Moore, Martin Clunes, Ralf Little, Paul Merton, Julian Clary, Billy Murray, Lisa Riley, Meera Syal, Trisha Goddard, Leslie Phillips, and S Club 7
- Dick Whittington (ITV 2002) – starring Richard Wilson, Harry Hill, James Fleet, Amanda Barrie, Roger Moore, Kevin Bishop, Julian Clary, Vanessa Feltz, Lee Mack, Tina O'Brien, Paul Merton, Debra Stephenson, Jessica Stevenson, Mark Williams, and Hear'Say

The Real Full Monty (ITV1 2023)

=== Touring productions ===
Touring shows that have visited Wimbledon over the years include:

Cats, Starlight Express, We Will Rock You, Sister Act, Monty Python's Spamalot, Avenue Q, Shrek the Musical, Chicago, The Sound of Music, Riverdance, Waitress, Dirty Rotten Scoundrels, 9 To 5, Rock of Ages, Dirty Dancing, Beauty and the Beast, School of Rock, Singin' in the Rain, Chitty Chitty Bang Bang, West Side Story, Jesus Christ Superstar, Bat Out of Hell: The Musical, Thoroughly Modern Millie, The Rocky Horror Show, Fame – The Musical, Priscilla Queen of the Desert – the Musical, Saturday Night Fever, Carousel, Footloose – The Musical, Grease, Anything Goes, Flashdance – The Musical and An Inspector Calls.

It has also been home to residencies of many Matthew Bourne productions including Swan Lake, The Nutcracker, Edward Scissorhands, The Car Man, Highland Fling and The Red Shoes.

=== Music video ===
- There Must Be an Angel (Playing with My Heart) – iconic video by Eurythmics was shot here in June 1985, directed by Eddie Arno and Mark Innocenti. It is one of the most memorable and heavy rotated videos on MTV.

=== Cultural references ===
The New Wimbledon Theatre is featured in "Final Curtain", Series 5 Episode 2 of the BBC TV program New Tricks
