= Schanck =

Schanck may refer to:

- John Schanck (1750–1823), captain in the New Jersey Militia during the American Revolutionary War
- Cape Schanck, locality in the Australian state of Victoria
- Cape Schanck Lighthouse, built in 1859 as the second coastal lighthouse in the Australian state of Victoria
- Daniel S. Schanck Observatory, former astronomical observatory on the Queens Campus of Rutgers University in New Brunswick, New Jersey, United States

== See also ==
- Schack
- Schank
- Schenk
- Shank (disambiguation)
- Shenk
- Shanklin
