= Schank =

Schank may refer to:

- John Schank (c. 1740–1823), officer of the British Royal Navy
- Roger Schank (1946 – 2023), American artificial intelligence theorist and cognitive psychologist
- Marco Schank (born 1954), Luxembourgian politician
- Mike Schank (1969–2022), American actor and musician

== See also ==
- Schack
- Schanck (disambiguation)
- Schenk
- Shank (disambiguation)
- Shenk
