= Shanks (surname) =

Shanks is a surname. Notable people with the surname include:

- Alison Shanks (born 1982), New Zealand professional racing cyclist
- Bill Shanks, American sports broadcaster and writer
- Bruce Shanks (1908–1980), American editorial cartoonist
- Charles G. Shanks (1841–1895), American journalist and editor
- Daniel Shanks (1917–1996), American mathematician
- Don Shanks (footballer) (born 1952), British footballer
- Don Shanks (stuntman) (born 1950), American actor and stuntman
- Donald Shanks (bass-baritone) (1940–2011), Australian operatic bass-baritone
- Edward Shanks (1892–1953), English writer
- Emily Shanks (1857–1936), British painter, born in Russia
- George Shanks (1896–1957), British writer, first translator of the Protocols of Zion into the English language
- Hershel Shanks (1930–2021), American founder of the Biblical Archaeology Society
- Howie Shanks (1890–1941), American baseball player
- James Steuart Shanks (1826–1911), British merchant in Moscow
- John Shanks (born 1964), American rock musician and songwriter
- John Peter Cleaver Shanks (1826–1901), U.S. Representative from Indiana
- Juanita Craft (1902–1985), born Juanita Jewel Shanks, American civil rights pioneer
- Katrina Shanks (born 1969), New Zealand politician
- Michael Shanks (born 1970), Canadian actor best known for his role as Daniel Jackson on Stargate SG-1
- Michael Shanks (archaeologist) (born 1959), British archaeologist
- Michael Shanks (journalist) (1927–1984), British journalist
- Michael Shanks (politician) (born 1988), Scottish politician
- Nancy Shanks (c. 1956–2019), American singer associated with Tori Amos
- Nelson Shanks (1937–2015), American painter
- Niall Shanks (1959–2011), British-American professor of history and philosophy
- Norman Shanks (born 1942), Church of Scotland minister
- Oliver Shanks (1915–1970), Canadian boxer
- Robert Shanks (footballer), English professional footballer
- Robert Shanks (pharmacologist) (born 1934), British pharmacologist
- Rosalind Shanks, British actress
- Simon Shanks (1977–2006), American football player
- Tiger Shanks (born 2002), Canadian football player
- Tommy Shanks (1880–1919), Irish soccer player
- William Shanks (1812–1882), English amateur mathematician, famous for his calculation of over 500 of digits of π, by hand
- William Somerville Shanks (1864–1951), Scottish artist
- Jordan Shanks-Markinova, Australian YouTube personality known as Friendlyjordies

== See also ==
- Shanks (disambiguation)
- Shank (surname)
