= Schenkl =

Schenkl is an Austro-Bavarian surname. Notable people with the surname include:

- Maurus von Schenkl (1749–1816), German Benedictine theologian and canon law jurist
- Karl Schenkl (1827–1900), Austrian classical philologist
- Emilie Schenkl (1910–1996), Austrian-Indian leader in the Indian Independence Movement

== See also ==
- Schenk
- Schenck
