= Schenke =

Schenke is a surname. Notable people with the surname include:

- Hans-Martin Schenke (born 1929, died 2002), German Coptologist and scholar of Gnosticism
- Siegfried Schenke (born 1943), East German sprinter
- Tobias Schenke (born 1981), German actor

== See also ==
- Schenk
- Schenken
