= Thomas Shanks =

Thomas Shanks may refer to:

- Tommy Shanks (1880–1919), Irish footballer
- Thomas G. Shanks (born 1942), American time zone history researcher
- Thomas Shanks (politician) (1796–1849), American politician from Virginia

== See also ==
- Shanks (disambiguation)
