= James Shanks =

James Shanks may refer to:

- James Shanks (New Zealand politician)
- James Shanks (Irish politician)
- James Steuart Shanks, British merchant living in Moscow

== See also ==
- James A. Shanks High School, a high school in Quincy, Florida
