= Schenck =

Schenck is a Jewish (Ashkenazic) and German occupational surname derived from schenken (to pour out or serve) referring to the medieval profession of cup-bearer or wine server (later also to tavern keeper). At one time only Jews were allowed to sell alcohol in the Russian empire, which is why Shenk (Russian) and its later surname variants are very common.

People with this surname include:

== People ==
- Adolph Schenck (1803–1878), German teacher and entomologist
- Aubrey Schenck (1908–1999), film producer
- August Friedrich Schenck (1828–1901), German painter
- Carl Alwyn Schenck (1868–1955), German pioneer of forestry in the USA and Europe
- Carl Schenck (1835–1910), German mercantilist and founder of the Carl Schenck Eisengießerei & Waagenfabrik
- Charles Schenck, American socialist
- Ernst-Günther Schenck (1904–1998), German doctor
- Ferdinand Schureman Schenck (1790–1860), American physician and politician
- Frederik V Schenck van Toutenburg (1503–1580), Dutch bishop
- George Schenck (1942–2024), American screenwriter
- Hal Schenck, American mathematician
- James F. Schenck, (1807–1882), rear Admiral in United States Navy
- Joe Schenck (1891–1930), singer, one of the duo Van and Schenck
- Johannes Schenck (1660–1712), Dutch composer
- John Schenck (1750–1823), New Jersey revolutionary soldier
- John Schenck (Manhasset, NY) (1740–1831), New York state senator
- John I. Schenck (1787–1833), New York politician
- Joseph M. Schenck (1878–1961), film studio executive
- Martin Schenck (1848–1918), NY State Engineer and Surveyor 1892–1893
- Martin Schenck von Nydeggen (1543–1589), Dutch soldier of fortune in 80 Years' War.
- Mary Schenck Woolman (1860–1940), pioneer in vocational education (born Mary Schenck)
- Michael Schenck (1876–1948), Justice of the North Carolina Supreme Court
- Nicholas Schenck (1881–1969), American film industry executive
- Norman C. Schenck, mycologist who described Glomus aggregatum
- Paul Schenck (born 1958), clergyman, lecturer, and author
- Paul F. Schenck (1899–1968), U.S. Representative from Ohio
- Robert C. Schenck (1809–1890), American Civil War general and U.S. Congressman
- Robert C. Schenck (politician) (born 1975), Florida, USA politician
- Rocky Schenck (born 1955), American music video director and photographer
- Walter Francis Schenck (1870–1941), American judge and mayor of Lubbock, Texas
- William Cortenus Schenck (1773–1821), American legislator
- Robert Louis Schenck (1947- ) Chief Master Sergeant in the United States Air Force.

== Other ==
- Schenck v. United States 249 U.S. 47 (1919), decision by the U.S. Supreme Court regarding the right to free speech
- Schenck Process is a German manufacturer of industrial equipment

== See also ==
- Wilhelm Schencke, Norwegian historian and professor
- Claus Schenk Graf von Stauffenberg (1907–1944), failed assassin of Adolf Hitler
- Schenk
- Shenk
- Shank (disambiguation)
