= Shank (surname) =

Shank is a surname. Notable people with the surname include:

- Bud Shank (1926–2009), American saxophonist and flutist
- Charles V. Shank (born 1943), American physicist
- Christopher B. Shank (born 1972), American politician in Maryland
- Daniel Shank (born 1967), Canadian ice hockey player
- David E. Shank (1888–1972), American agriculturalist
- Harvey Shank (born 1946), Canadian baseball player
- Henry Shank (1892–1962), American gridiron football player
- John Shank (died 1636), English actor
- Jon Beck Shank (1919–1977), American Mormon poet and educator
- Kendra Shank (born 1958), American jazz vocalist
- Michael Shank (born 1966), American race car team owner and former race car driver
- Ned Shank (1956–2000), American essayist, historic preservationist, and author
- Otm Shank (born Rik Dobson), British electronic music producer
- Russell Shank (1925–2012), American librarian
- Stephen Shank (fl. 1991–2011), Belgian-American director, actor, and writer

== See also ==
- Adebisi Shank, an Irish rock trio
- Shank (disambiguation)
- Shanks (surname)
