= Shanks =

Shanks may refer to:

== People ==
- Shanks (surname), includes a list of notable people with the surname

=== Nickname ===
- Edward I (1239–1307), English king known as "Longshanks"
- Nathan G. Evans (1824–1868), Confederate Army general nicknamed "Shanks"
- Bill Shankly (1913–1981), British football manager nicknamed "Shanks"

== Places ==
- Camp Shanks, a United States Army installation in the town of Orangetown, New York
- Mount Shanks, a mountain in British Columbia, Canada
- Shanks, West Virginia in Hampshire County, West Virginia, United States
- Shanks Islands (Tasmania), Australia

== Fictional characters ==
- Dacre Shanks, a character parodying undead serial killer Freddy Krueger in the novel Demon Road
- Professor Shonku (nicknames include Shanks), a character created by Satyajit Ray
- Shanks (One Piece), a character in the manga series One Piece

== Other uses ==
- Shanks (film), a 1974 movie directed by William Castle and starring Marcel Marceau
- Tringa, a genus of waders, containing the shanks and tattlers
- Armitage Shanks, a UK toilet manufacturer
- F & R Shanks, British coachbuilders*
- Shanks & Bigfoot, a British songwriting/production duo
- Shanks Group plc, a UK waste mangamement company
- Shanks Restaurant, a former Michelin starred restaurant in Northern Ireland

== See also ==
- Shank (disambiguation)
