= Jewels of Elizabeth II =

Historic collection of British royal jewellery

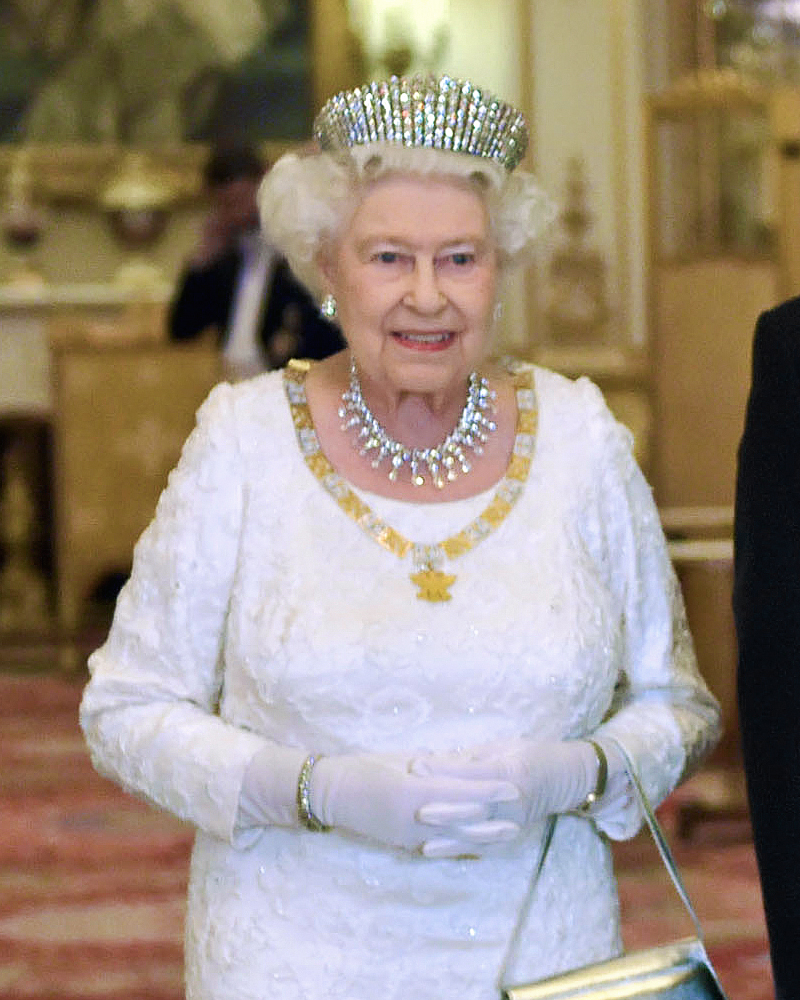
Queen Elizabeth II wearing the Kokoshnik Tiara, diamond earrings, a diamond necklace and bracelet, and a silver watch to a state banquet for the President of Mexico in 2015. The larger necklace is the Grand Collar of the Order of the Aztec Eagle (awarded to her in 1973).

Elizabeth II owned a historic collection of jewels – some as monarch and others as a private individual. They are separate from the gems and jewels of the Royal Collection, and from the coronation and state regalia that make up the Crown Jewels.

The origin of a distinct royal jewel collection is vague, though it is believed the jewels have their origin somewhere in the 16th century. Many of the pieces are from overseas and were brought to the United Kingdom as a result of civil war, coups and revolutions, or acquired as gifts to the monarch. Most of the jewellery dates from the 19th and 20th centuries.

The Crown Jewels are worn only at coronations (St Edward's Crown being used to crown the monarch) and the annual State Opening of Parliament (the Imperial State Crown). At other formal occasions, such as banquets, Elizabeth II wore the jewellery in her collection. She owned more than 300 items of jewellery, including 98 brooches, 46 necklaces, 37 bracelets, 34 pairs of earrings, 20 tiaras, 15 rings, 14 watches and 5 pendants, the most notable of which are detailed in this article.

== History ==
=== General history ===
Unlike the Crown Jewels—which mainly date from the accession of Charles II—the jewels are not official regalia or insignia. Much of the collection was designed for queens regnant and queens consort, though some kings have added to the collection. Most of the jewellery was purchased from other European heads of state and members of the aristocracy, or handed down by older generations of the royal family, often as birthday and wedding presents. In recent years, Elizabeth had worn them in her capacity as Queen of Australia, Canada and New Zealand, and can be seen wearing jewels from her collection in official portraits made specially for these realms.

=== House of Hanover dispute ===
In 1714, with the accession of George I, the Kingdom of Great Britain and the Electorate of Hanover both came to be ruled in personal union by the House of Hanover. Early Hanoverian monarchs were careful to keep the heirlooms of the two realms separate. George III gave half the British heirlooms to his bride, Charlotte of Mecklenburg-Strelitz, as a wedding present. In her will, Charlotte left the jewels to the 'House of Hanover'. The Kingdom of Hanover followed the Salic Law, whereby the line of succession went through male heirs.

Thus, when Queen Victoria acceded to the throne of the United Kingdom, her uncle Ernest Augustus, Duke of Cumberland and Teviotdale became King of Hanover. King Ernest demanded a portion of the jewellery, not only as the monarch of Hanover but also as the son of Queen Charlotte. Victoria flatly declined to hand over any of the jewels, claiming they had been bought with British money. Ernest's son, George V of Hanover, continued to press the claim. Victoria's husband, Prince Albert, suggested that she make a financial settlement with the Hanoverian monarch to keep the jewels, but Parliament informed Queen Victoria they would neither purchase the jewels nor loan funds for the purpose.

A parliamentary commission was set up to investigate the matter and in 1857 they found in favour of the House of Hanover. On 28 January 1858, seven years after Ernest's death, the jewels were handed to the Hanoverian Ambassador, Count Adolf von Kielmansegg. Victoria did manage to keep one of her favourite pieces of jewellery: a fine rope of pearls.

== Ownership and value ==
Some pieces of jewellery made before the death of Queen Victoria in 1901 are regarded as heirlooms owned by the monarch in right of the Crown and pass from one monarch to the next in perpetuity. Objects made later, including official gifts, can also be added to that part of the Royal Collection at the sole discretion of a monarch. It is not possible to say how much the collection is worth because the jewels have a rich and unique history, and they are unlikely to be sold on the open market.

In the early 20th century, five other lists of jewellery, which have also never been published, supplemented those left to the Crown by Queen Victoria:

- Jewels left to the Crown by Queen Victoria
- Jewels left by Her Majesty to His Majesty the King (Edward VII)
- Jewels left to King Edward VII by Queen Victoria, hereinafter to be considered as belonging to the Crown and to be worn by all future queens in right of it
- Jewels the property of King George V
- Jewels given to the Crown by Queen Mary
- Jewels given to the Crown by King George V

== Tiaras ==
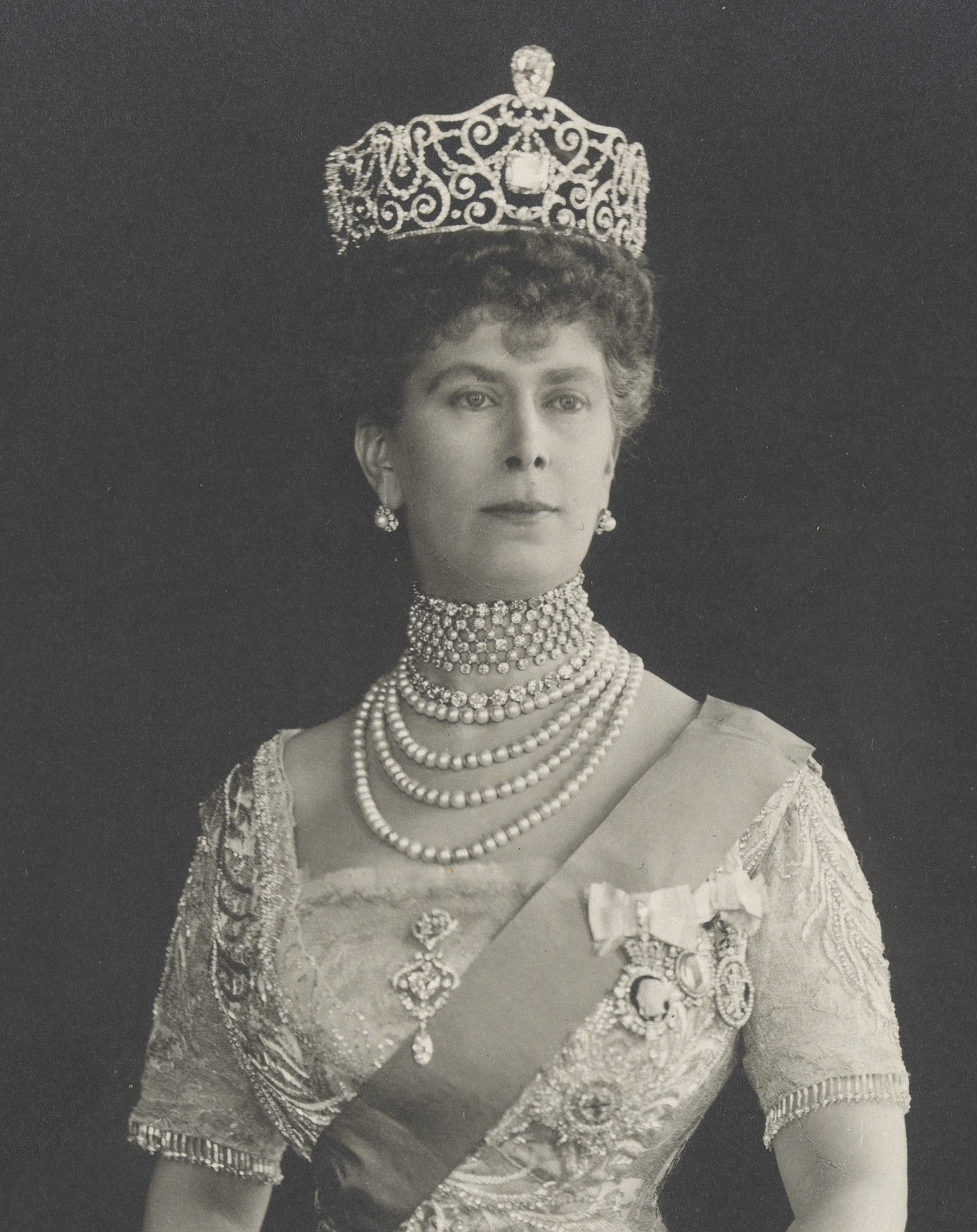
Queen Mary wearing the Delhi Durbar Tiara (since redesigned)

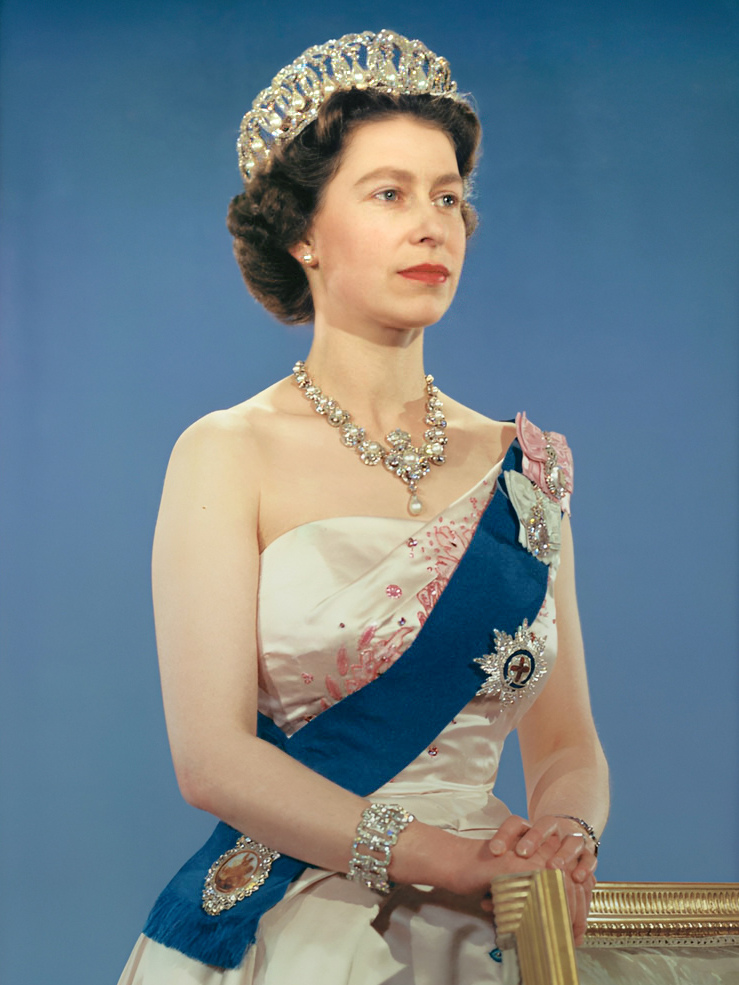
Elizabeth II in 1959 wearing the Vladimir tiara and the Queen Victoria Jubilee Necklace

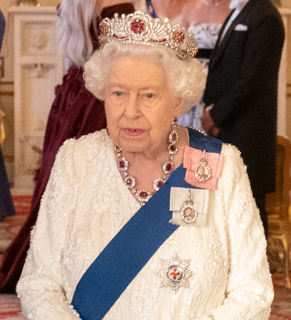
Elizabeth II wearing the Burmese Ruby Tiara at a state banquet in 2019

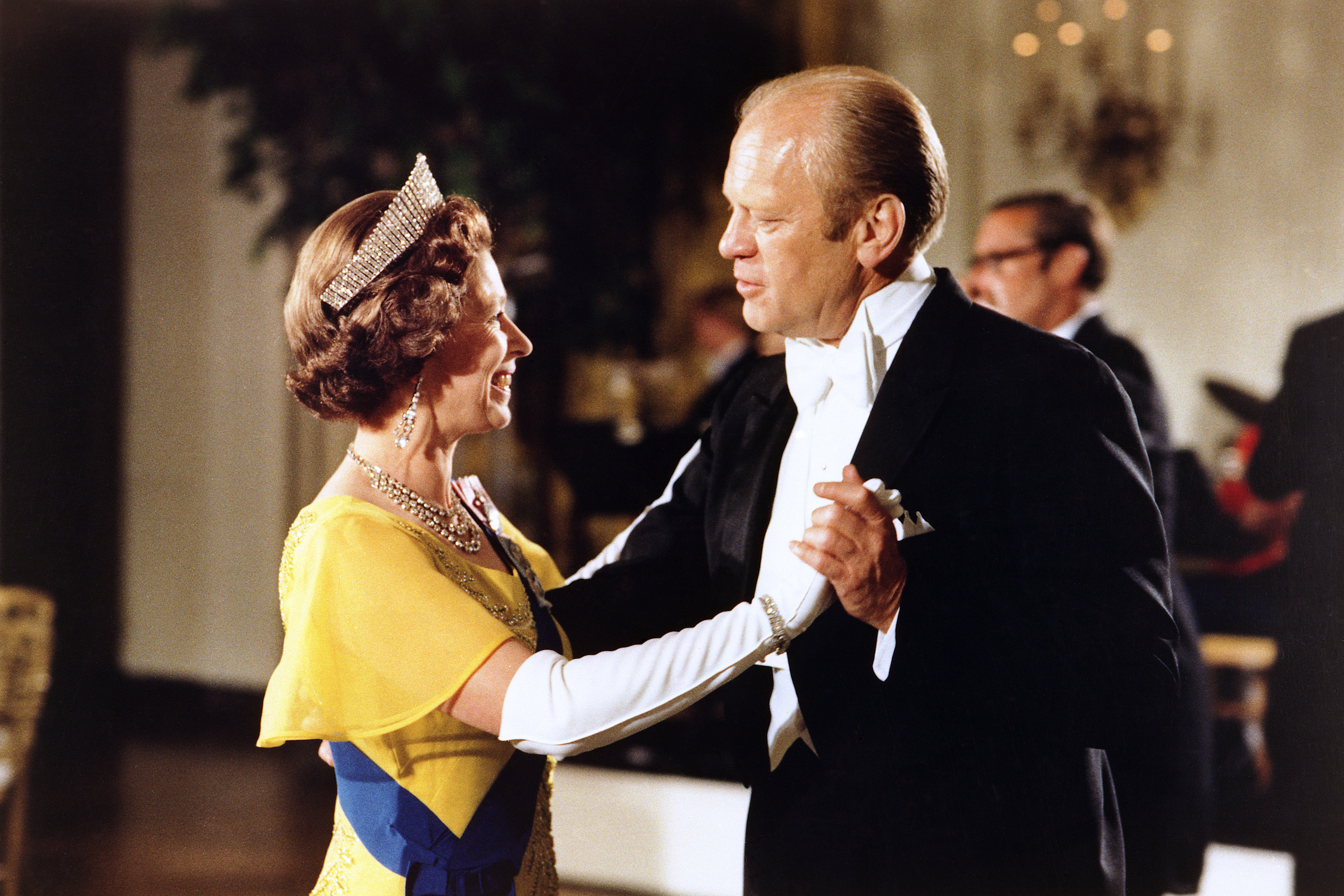
Elizabeth II wearing the Kokoshnik Tiara while dancing with President Ford at the White House in 1976

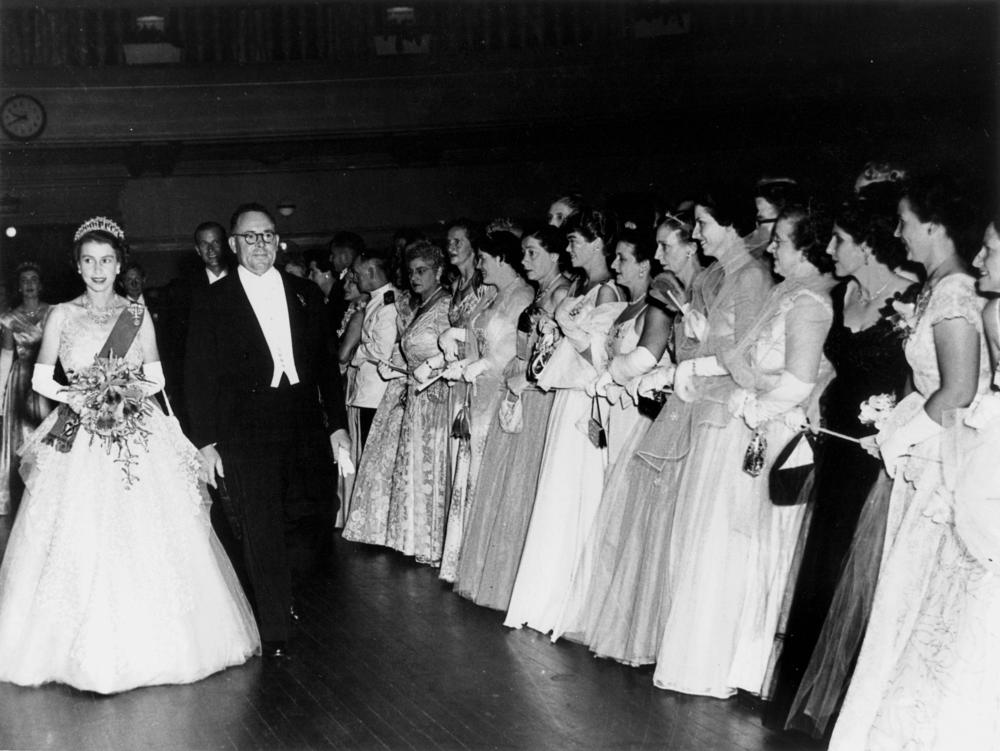
Elizabeth II wearing the Lover's Knot Tiara at the Royal Ball, Brisbane in 1954

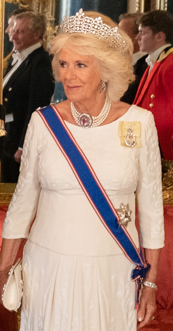
The Duchess of Cornwall (later Queen Camilla) wearing the Greville Tiara at a state banquet in 2019

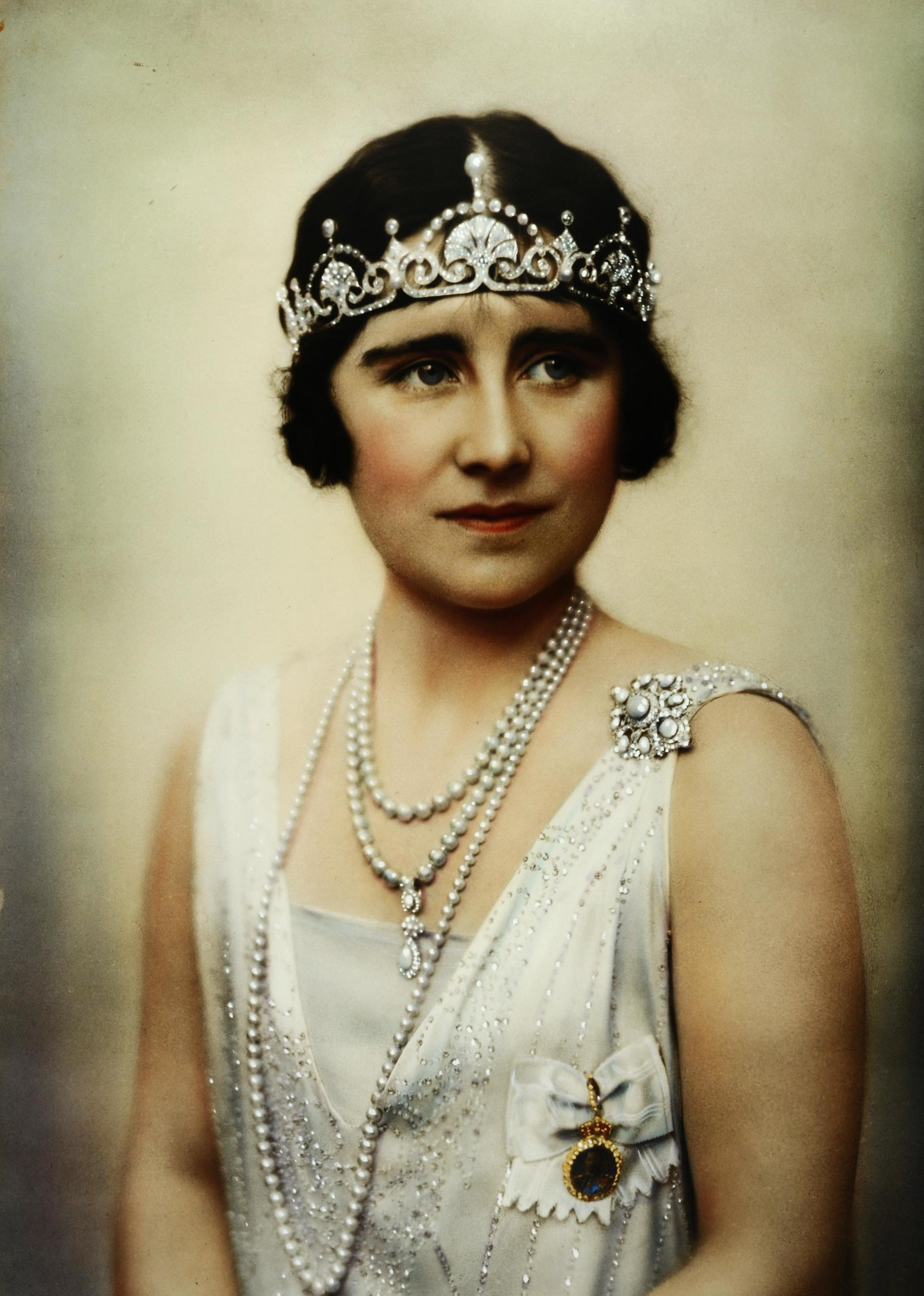
The Duchess of York (later Queen Elizabeth the Queen Mother) wearing the Lotus Flower Tiara in 1925

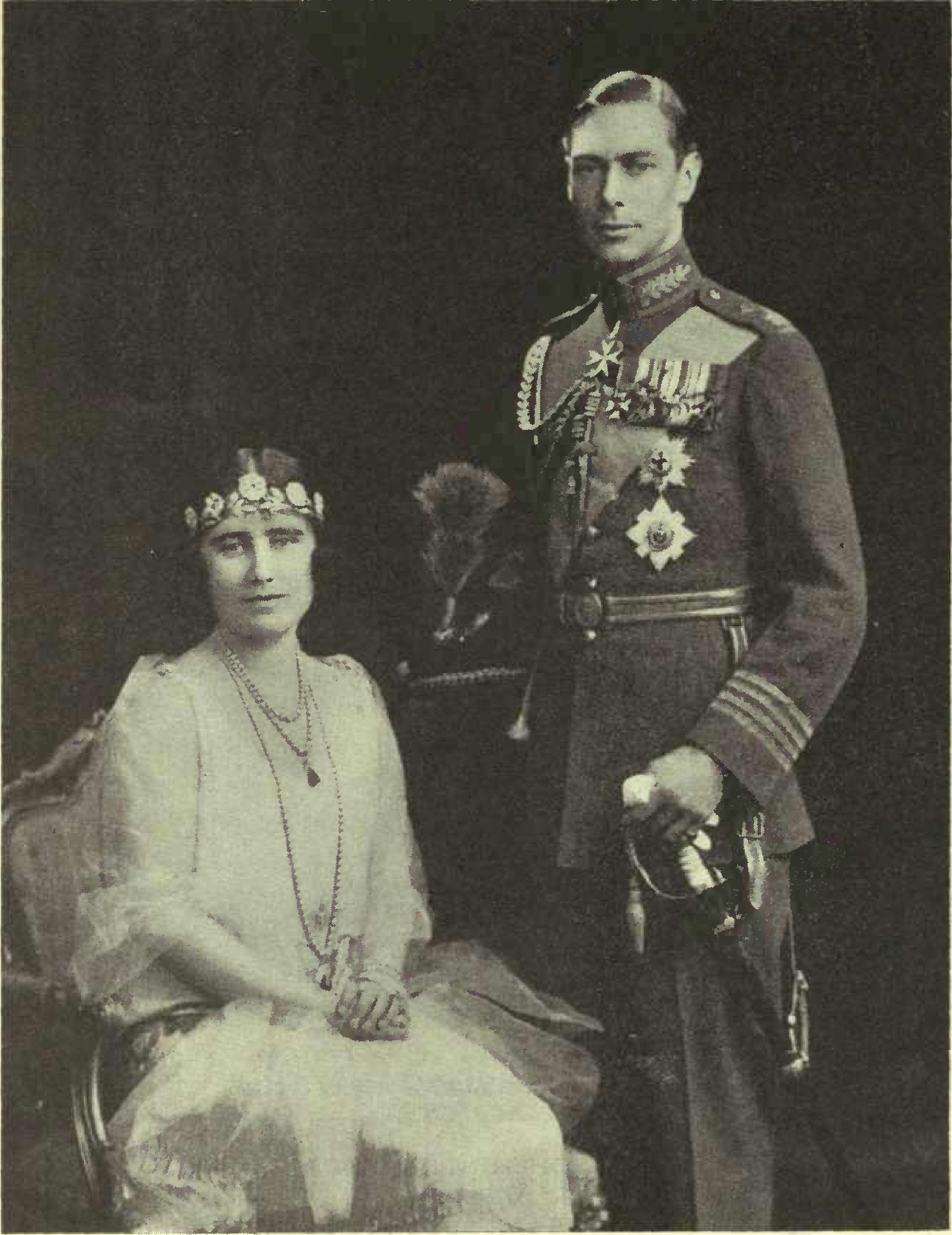
The Duchess of York (later Queen Elizabeth the Queen Mother) wearing the Strathmore Rose Tiara in 1927

=== Delhi Durbar Tiara ===
The Delhi Durbar Tiara was made by Garrard & Co. for Queen Mary, the wife of King George V, to wear at the Delhi Durbar in 1911. As the Crown Jewels never leave the country, George V had the Imperial Crown of India made to wear at the Durbar, and Queen Mary wore the tiara. It was part of a set of jewellery made for Queen Mary to use at the event which included a necklace, stomacher, brooch and earrings. Made of gold and platinum, the tiara is 8 cm (3 in) tall and has the form of a tall circlet of lyres and S-scrolls linked by festoons of diamonds. It was originally set with 10 of the Cambridge emeralds, acquired by Queen Mary in 1910 and first owned by her grandmother, the Duchess of Cambridge. In 1912, the tiara was altered to take one or both of the Cullinan III and IV diamonds; the pear-shaped diamond was held at the top, and the cushion-shaped stone hung in the oval aperture underneath. Mary lent the tiara to Queen Elizabeth (later the Queen Mother) for the 1947 royal tour of South Africa, and it remained with her until she died in 2002, when it passed to Elizabeth II. In 2005, Elizabeth II lent the tiara to her daughter-in-law the Duchess of Cornwall (now Queen Camilla).

=== Queen Mary Fringe Tiara ===
This tiara, which can also be worn as a necklace, was made for Queen Mary in 1919. It has 47 tapering bars, set with brilliant-cut and rose-cut diamonds, alternated with smaller spikes with lozenge-set diamonds, involving gold and silver settings. It was designed to be a "Russian" pattern, based on kokoshoniks, and was made by Garrard & Co. It is not, as has sometimes been claimed, made with diamonds that once belonged to George III, but reuses diamonds taken from a necklace/tiara purchased by Queen Victoria from Collingwood & Co. as a wedding present for Princess Mary in 1893. In August 1936, Mary gave the tiara to her daughter-in-law Queen Elizabeth (later the Queen Mother). When Queen Elizabeth, consort of King George VI, first wore the tiara, Sir Henry Channon called it "an ugly spiked tiara". Later, she lent the piece to her daughter, Princess Elizabeth (future Elizabeth II), as "something borrowed" for her wedding to Prince Philip in 1947. As Princess Elizabeth was getting dressed at Buckingham Palace before leaving for Westminster Abbey, the tiara snapped. Luckily, a Garrard jeweller was standing by in case of any emergency, and was rushed to his work room by a police escort. Queen Elizabeth (later the Queen Mother) reassured her daughter that it would be fixed in time, and it was. The Queen Mother lent it to her granddaughter, Princess Anne, for her wedding to Captain Mark Phillips in 1973. It was later lent to Princess Beatrice for her wedding to Edoardo Mapelli Mozzi in 2020.

It was exhibited with a number of other royal tiaras in 2001.

=== Queen Adelaide's Fringe Necklace ===
The Queen Adelaide's Fringe Necklace is a circlet incorporating brilliant diamonds that were formerly owned by George III. Originally commissioned in 1830 and made by Rundell, Bridge & Co, the necklace has been worn by many queens consort. Originally, it could be worn as a collar or necklace. Queen Victoria modified it so it could be mounted on a wire to form the tiara. Queen Victoria wore it as a tiara during a visit to the Royal Opera in 1839. In Franz Xaver Winterhalter's painting The First of May, completed in 1851, Victoria can be seen wearing it as she holds Prince Arthur, the future Duke of Connaught and Strathearn. In a veiled reference to the adoration of the Magi, the Duke of Wellington is seen presenting the young prince with a gift. It was classified as an "heirloom of the Crown" in Garrard's 1858 inventory of Queen Victoria's jewels.

=== Grand Duchess Vladimir Tiara ===
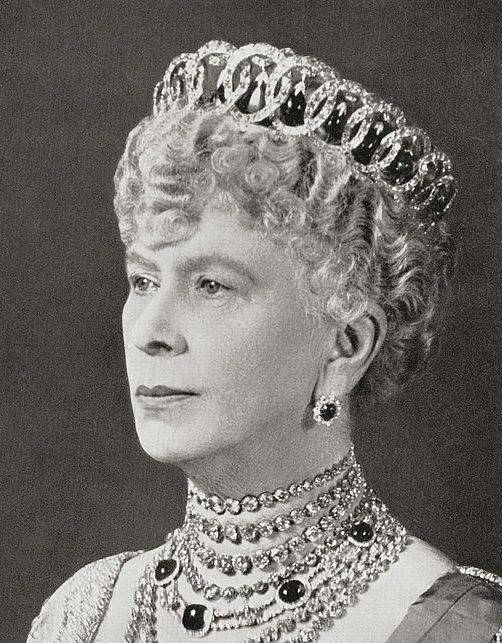
Queen Mary wearing the tiara with the Cambridge emeralds

The Grand Duchess Vladimir Tiara (Владимирская тиара), sometimes the Diamond and Pearl Tiara, was bought, along with a diamond rivière, by Queen Mary from Grand Duchess Elena Vladimirovna of Russia, mother of the Duchess of Kent, in 1921 for a price of £28,000. The grand duchess, known after her marriage as Princess Nicholas of Greece, inherited it from her mother, Grand Duchess Maria Pavlovna, who received it as a wedding gift from her husband in 1874. It originally had 15 large drop pearls, and was made by the jeweller Carl Edvard Bolin at a cost of 48,200 rubles.

During the Russian Revolution in 1917, the tiara was hidden with other jewels somewhere in Vladimir Palace in Petrograd, and later saved from the Bolsheviks by Albert Stopford, a British art dealer and secret agent. In the years to follow, Princess Nicholas sold pieces of jewellery from her collection to support her exiled family and various charities.

Queen Mary had the tiara altered to accommodate 15 of the Cambridge cabochon emeralds. The original drop pearls can easily be replaced as an alternative to the emeralds. Elizabeth II inherited the tiara directly from her grandmother in 1953. It is almost exclusively worn together with the Cambridge and Delhi Durbar parures, also containing large emeralds. Elizabeth wore the tiara in her official portrait as Queen of Canada as none of the Commonwealth realms besides the United Kingdom have their own crown jewels.

=== Girls of Great Britain and Ireland Tiara ===
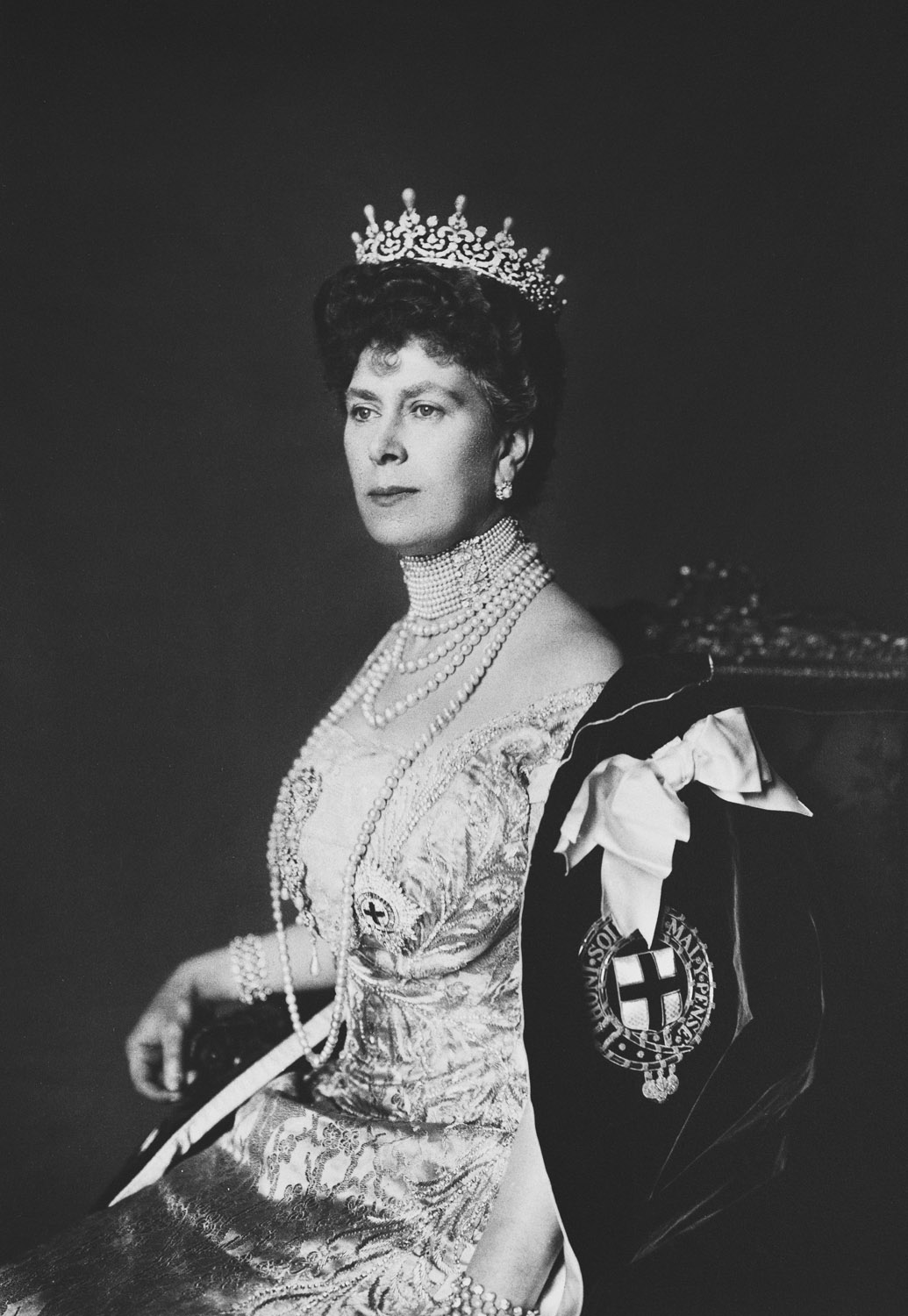
Mary wearing the Girls of Great Britain and Ireland tiara in its original setting, 1912

Elizabeth II's first tiara was a wedding present in 1947 from her grandmother, Queen Mary, who received it as a gift from the Girls of Great Britain and Ireland in 1893 on the occasion of her marriage to the Duke of York, later George V. Made by E. Wolfe & Co., it was purchased from Garrard & Co. by a committee organised by Lady Eva Greville. In 1914, Mary adapted the tiara to take 13 diamonds in place of the large oriental pearls surmounting the tiara. Leslie Field, author of The Queen's Jewels, described it as, "a festoon-and-scroll with nine large oriental pearls on diamond spikes and set on a base of alternate round and lozenge collets between two plain bands of diamonds". At first, Elizabeth wore the tiara without its base and pearls but the base was reattached in 1969. The Girls of Great Britain and Ireland Tiara is one of Elizabeth's most recognisable pieces of jewellery due to its widespread appearance in portraits of the monarch on British banknotes and coinage. Elizabeth II's daughter-in-law Queen Camilla wore this tiara for the first time when she visited Mansion House in 2023.

=== Burmese Ruby Tiara ===
Elizabeth ordered the Burmese Ruby Tiara in 1973, and it was made by Garrard & Co. It is designed in the form of a wreath of roses, with silver and diamonds making the petals, and clusters of gold and rubies forming the centre of the flowers. A total of 96 rubies are mounted on the tiara; they were originally part of a necklace given to her in 1947 as a wedding present by the people of Burma (now Myanmar), who credited them with having the ability to protect their owner from sickness and evil. The diamonds were taken from a floral tiara made by Cartier in 1935 and chosen by Elizabeth herself as her wedding present from the wealthy Nizam of Hyderabad. While this floral tiara was dismantled, rose brooches were preserved. This tiara was later worn by Queen Camilla in 2023.

=== Queen Alexandra's Kokoshnik Tiara ===
The Kokoshnik Tiara was presented to Alexandra, Princess of Wales, as a 25th wedding anniversary gift in 1888 by Lady Salisbury on behalf of 365 peeresses of the United Kingdom. She had always wanted a tiara in the style of a kokoshnik (Russian for "cock's comb"), a traditional Russian folk headdress, and knew the design well from a tiara belonging to her sister, Maria Feodorovna, the Empress of Russia. It was made by Garrard & Co. and has vertical white gold bars pavé-set with diamonds, the longest of which is 6.5 cm (2.5 in). In a letter to her aunt, the Grand Duchess of Mecklenburg-Strelitz, Princess Mary wrote, "The presents are quite magnificent [...] The ladies of society gave [Alexandra] a lovely diamond spiked tiara". Upon the death of Queen Alexandra, the tiara passed to her daughter-in-law Queen Mary, who bequeathed it to Elizabeth in 1953. The tiara is featured in a 1960 portrait of the Queen taken by Anthony Buckley, which was used as the banknote portrait of the Queen for several countries and territories. The tiara is also featured on a 1979 New Zealand coin effigy of the Queen designed by James Berry.

=== Queen Mary's Lover's Knot Tiara ===
In 1913, Queen Mary asked Garrard & Co. to make a copy of a tiara owned by her grandmother Princess Augusta of Hesse-Kassel using Queen Mary's own diamonds and pearls. French in its neo-classical design, the tiara has 19 oriental pearls suspended from lover's knot bows each centered with a large brilliant. Originally, the tiara had 38 pearls; 19 on the upright side and 19 hanging from the arches. The 19 upright pearls were removed. Mary left the tiara to Elizabeth II, who later loaned it to Diana, Princess of Wales, for her wedding, but she wore her family tiara instead. She wore it often, notably with her 'Elvis dress' on a visit to Hong Kong in 1989, but on her divorce from Prince Charles it was returned to Elizabeth. Catherine, Princess of Wales has worn it to a number of state occasions since 2015.

=== Meander Tiara ===
This tiara was a wedding present to Elizabeth from her mother-in-law, Princess Andrew of Greece and Denmark. The Meander Tiara is in the classical Greek key pattern, with a large diamond in the centre enclosed by a laurel wreath of diamonds. It also incorporates a wreath of leaves and scrolls on either side. Elizabeth II never wore this item in public, and it was given in 1972 to her daughter, Princess Anne, who has frequently worn the tiara in public, notably during her engagement to Captain Mark Phillips and for an official portrait marking her 50th birthday. Anne lent the tiara to her daughter, Zara Philips, to use at her wedding to Mike Tindall in 2011.

=== Cartier Halo Tiara ===
This tiara, made by Cartier in 1936, was purchased by the Duke of York (later King George VI) for his wife (later the Queen Mother) three weeks before they became king and queen. It has a rolling cascade of 16 scrolls that converge on two central scrolls topped by a diamond. Altogether, it contains 739 brilliants and 149 baton diamonds. The tiara was given to Elizabeth on her 18th birthday in 1944, and was borrowed by Princess Margaret, who used it at the 1953 coronation of Elizabeth II. Later, Elizabeth lent the Halo Tiara to Princess Anne, before giving her the Greek Meander Tiara in 1972. The Halo Tiara was lent to the then Duchess of Cambridge to wear at her wedding to Prince William in 2011.

=== Greville Honeycomb Tiara ===
This tiara was left to Queen Elizabeth (later the Queen Mother) by Dame Margaret Greville upon Greville's death in 1942. Made by Boucheron in 1920, the tiara features a honeycomb-patterned diamond lattice and was a favorite of the Queen Mother. In 1953, the Queen Mother commissioned Cartier to modify its height by rearranging the diamonds located on the upper row. Elizabeth II inherited the tiara from her mother in 2002 and subsequently placed it under long-term loan to the then Duchess of Cornwall.

=== Queen Mary's Diamond Bandeau Tiara ===
The tiara was made in 1932 for Queen Mary. Its centre brooch had been a wedding gift from the County of Lincoln in 1893. The tiara is a platinum band, made up of eleven sections, a detachable centre brooch with interlaced opals and diamonds. The tiara was lent to the Duchess of Sussex to use at her wedding to Prince Harry in 2018.

=== Lotus Flower Tiara ===
This tiara was created by Garrard London in the 1920s. Made out of pearls and diamonds, it was made from a necklace originally given to Queen Elizabeth (later the Queen Mother) as a wedding gift. It was often worn by Princess Margaret, upon whose death, the tiara was returned to Elizabeth II. The tiara has been worn at a number of state occasions by Elizabeth II's granddaughter-in-law the Princess of Wales.

=== Strathmore Rose Tiara ===
Given to the Queen Mother as a wedding gift by her father Claude Bowes-Lyon, 14th Earl of Strathmore and Kinghorne, this floral piece was worn by the Queen Mother for a few years following her marriage. It was brought from Catchpole and Williams and the flowers can be detached and used as brooches. It became a part of Elizabeth II's collection since her mother's death in 2002.

=== Greville Emerald Kokoshnik Tiara ===
Like the Greville Honeycomb Tiara, this tiara was also part of Dame Margaret Greville's 1942 bequest to Queen Elizabeth (later the Queen Mother). The tiara was constructed by Boucheron in 1919 and features diamonds and several large emeralds in a kokoshnik-style platinum setting. Princess Eugenie of York wore the tiara at her October 2018 wedding; this marked the first public wearing of the tiara by a member of the royal family. In 2025, Queen Camilla wore this tiara at the annual diplomatic reception.

=== Queen Mother's Cartier Bandeau ===
Composed of ruby, emerald, and sapphire bracelets given to Queen Elizabeth (later the Queen Mother) by King George VI, the set was worn by the Queen Mother in the form of a bandeau. It is now a part of Elizabeth II's collection; she had worn the pieces individually as bracelets over the years and had also lent them to other members of the royal family.

=== Queen Victoria's Oriental Circlet Tiara ===
Designed by Prince Albert and made by Garrard for Queen Victoria in 1853. Originally a complete circlet set with diamonds and opals. Remodeled in 1858 to remove diamonds lost in the Hanoverian claim, leaving space open at the back of the tiara. Opals were replaced with rubies by Queen Alexandra in 1902. It is made up of 'Moghul arches and lotus flowers' in diamonds and rubies. The tiara was seen multiple times on the Queen Mother, but Elizabeth II only wore it once during the state visit to Malta in 2005. The tiara was later worn by Catherine, Princess of Wales during a state banquet in December 2025.

=== Belgian Sapphire Tiara ===
The tiara was originally a necklace belonging to Louise of Belgium, Princess of Saxe-Coburg and Gotha in 1858. The Queen bought the necklace which was converted into a tiara in 1963 to add to her collection. She has paired the tiara with George VI Sapphire Parure which was seen multiple times on the state tours in the 60s and 70s.

=== Brazilian Aquamarine Parure Tiara ===
This tiara made by Garrard in 1957 comes as part of a set of necklace and earrings gifted to the Queen for her coronation in 1953 by President Getúlio Vargas and the people of Brazil. It is made up of emerald-cut aquamarines and diamonds. It has been redesigned in 1971 with aquamarines given by the Governor of São Paulo in 1968.

== Earrings ==
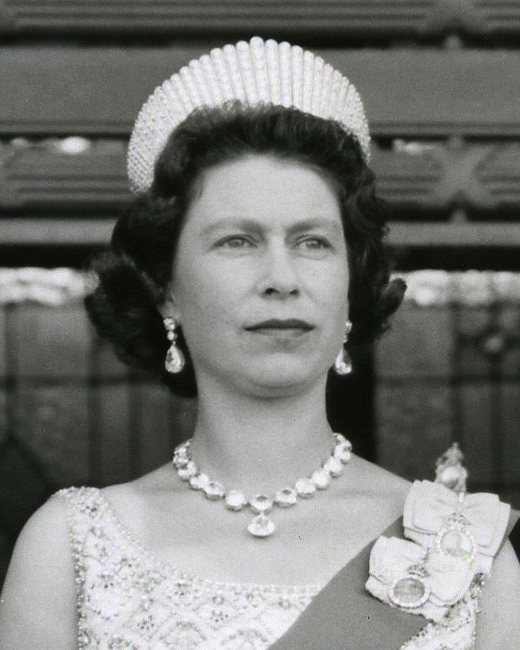
The Queen wearing the Coronation Earrings and matching necklace at the opening of the New Zealand Parliament in 1963. She also wore the Kokoshnik Tiara.

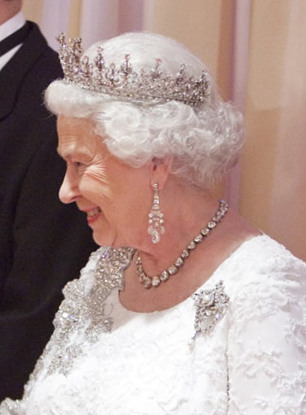
Elizabeth II wearing Greville Chandelier Earrings, 2010

=== Coronation Earrings ===
Like the Coronation Necklace, these earrings have been worn by queens regnant and consort at every coronation since 1901. Made for Queen Victoria in 1858 using the diamonds from an old Garter badge, they are of typical design: a large brilliant followed by a smaller one, with a large pear-shaped drop. The drops were originally part of the Koh-i-Noor armlet. After they had been made, Victoria wore the earrings and matching necklace in the painting Queen Victoria by the European court painter, Franz Winterhalter.

=== The Duchess of Gloucester's Pendant Earrings ===
These earrings originally had detachable pearl and diamond cluster tops. These tops were given to Princess Elizabeth by Queen Mary in 1947, and Princess Elizabeth wore them on her wedding day. The drops now have a diamond solitaire topper. The pendant earrings have been worn regularly by Queen Elizabeth including important state occasions, such as the State Opening of Parliament in Mauritius in 1972.

=== Queen Mary's Floret Earrings ===
These earrings were made for Queen Mary by Garrards, and consist of a large central diamond surrounded by seven smaller diamonds. The two large central diamonds were a wedding present from Sir William Mackinnon.

=== Queen Mary's Cluster Earrings ===
These earrings were made for Queen Mary by Garrards. The central stones were a wedding present from the Bombay Presidency.

=== Greville Chandelier Earrings ===
These 7.5 cm (3 in) long chandelier earrings made by Cartier in 1929 have three large drops adorned with every modern cut of diamond. The earrings were purchased by Margaret Greville, who left them to her friend the Queen Mother in 1942, and Elizabeth's parents gave them to her in 1947 as a wedding present. However, she was not able to use them until she had her ears pierced. When the public noticed that her ears had been pierced, doctors and jewellers found themselves inundated with requests by women anxious to have their ears pierced too. Catherine, Princess of Wales wore the earrings at the state banquet held following the wedding of Hussein, Crown Prince of Jordan, and Rajwa Al Saif in 2023.

=== Greville Pear-drop Earrings ===
As well as the chandelier earrings, and 60 other pieces of jewellery, Margaret Greville left the Queen Mother a set of pear-drop earrings that she had bought from Cartier in 1938. The pear-shaped drop diamonds each weigh about 20 carats (4 g). Diana, Princess of Wales, borrowed them in 1983 to wear on her first official visit to Australia. At a state banquet, she wore the earrings with a tiara from her family's own collection. The Greville Pear-drop Earrings passed to Elizabeth II upon her mother's death in 2002.

=== Bahrain Diamond and Pearl Earrings ===
Made out of a "shell containing seven pearls" that were given to Elizabeth as a wedding gift by the Hakim of Bahrain, these earrings consist of a round diamond followed by a circle diamond from which three baguette diamonds are suspended. At the bottom, three smaller diamonds are attached to the round pearl. These earrings were occasionally lent by Elizabeth II to her daughters-in-law Diana and Sophie, and granddaughter-in-law Catherine.

== Necklaces ==
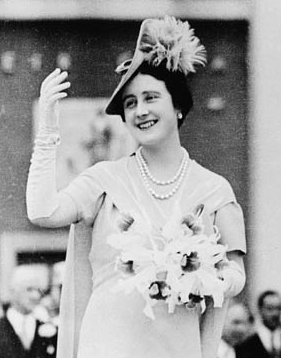
Queen Elizabeth (later the Queen Mother) wearing the Queen Anne and Queen Caroline pearls, 1939

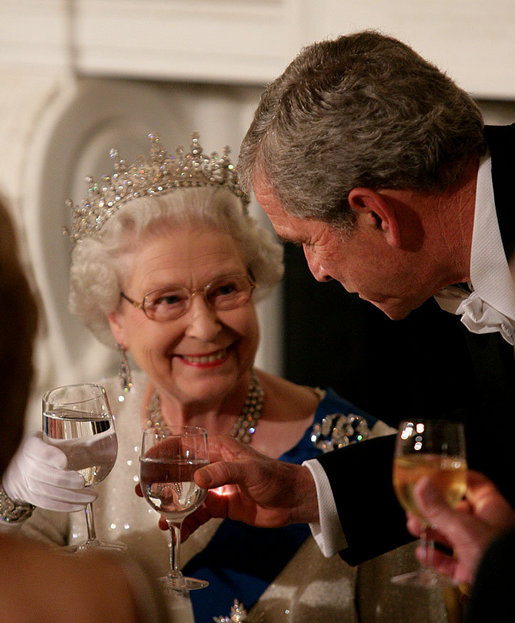
Elizabeth II wearing the Girls of Great Britain and Ireland Tiara and the Festoon Necklace

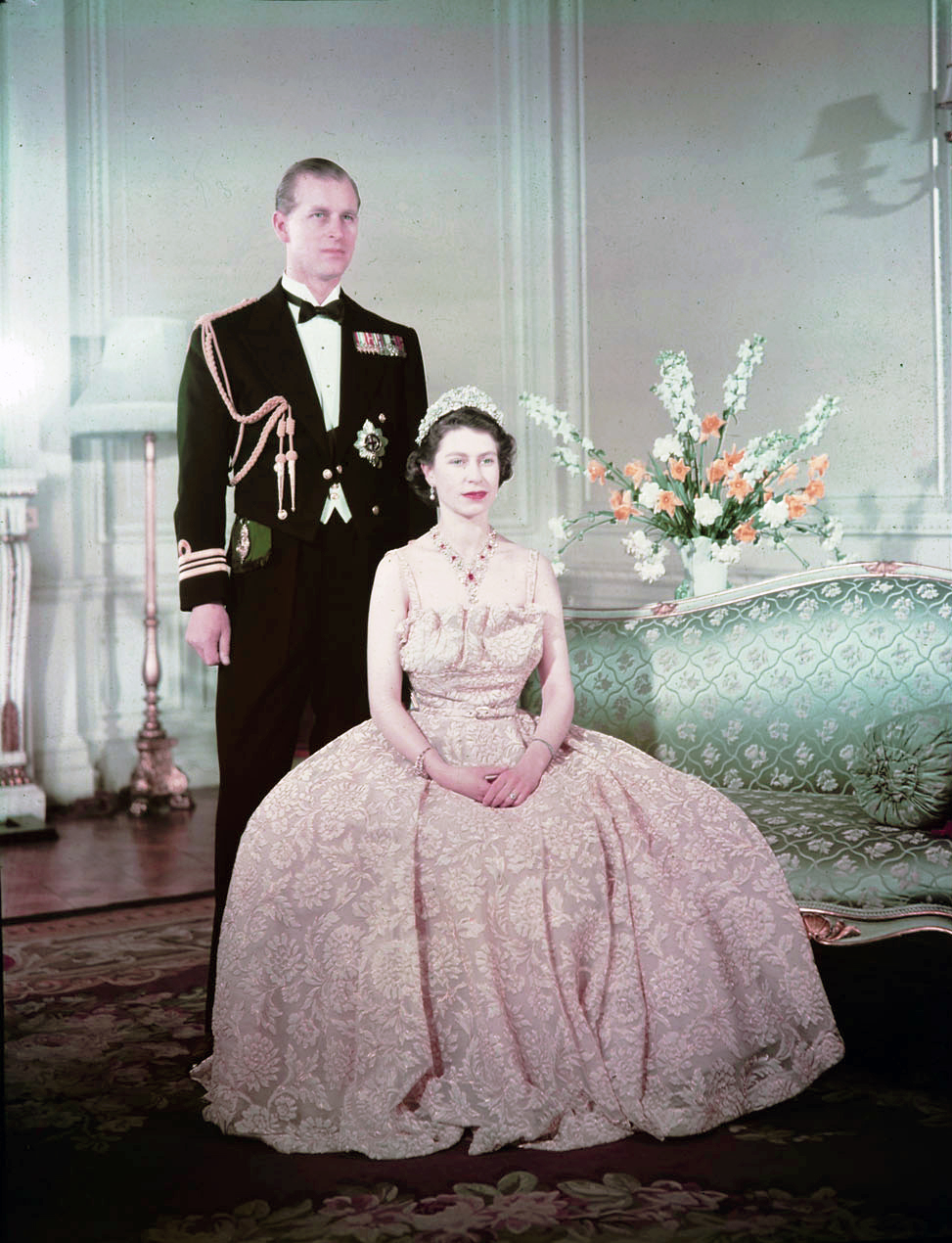
Princess Elizabeth (later Queen Elizabeth II) wearing the Greville Ruby Floral Bandeau Necklace, 1950

=== Queen Anne and Queen Caroline Pearl Necklaces ===
Both necklaces consist of a single row of large graduated pearls with pearl clasps. The Queen Anne Necklace is said to have belonged to Queen Anne, the last British monarch of the Stuart dynasty. Horace Walpole, the English art historian, wrote in his diary, "Queen Anne had but few jewels and those indifferent, except one pearl necklace given to her by Prince George". Queen Caroline, on the other hand, had a great deal of valuable jewellery, including no fewer than four pearl necklaces. She wore all the pearl necklaces to her coronation in 1727, but afterwards had the 50 best pearls selected to make one large necklace. In 1947, both necklaces were given to Elizabeth by her father as a wedding present. On her wedding day, Elizabeth realised that she had left her pearls at St James's Palace. Her private secretary, Jock Colville, was asked to go and retrieve them. He commandeered the limousine of King Haakon VII of Norway, but traffic that morning had stopped, so even the King's car with its royal flag flying could not get anywhere. Colville completed his journey on foot, and when he arrived at St James's Palace, he had to explain the odd story to the guards who were protecting Elizabeth's 2,660 wedding presents. They let him in after finding his name on a guest list, and he was able to get the pearls to the princess in time for her portrait in the Music Room of Buckingham Palace.

=== King Faisal of Saudi Arabia Necklace ===
A gift from King Faisal of Saudi Arabia, it is a necklace in design and set with brilliant and baguette cut diamonds. King Faisal bought the necklace, made by the American jeweller Harry Winston, and presented it to Elizabeth II while on a state visit to the United Kingdom in 1967. Before his departure, she wore it to a banquet at The Dorchester hotel. She also lent the necklace to Diana, Princess of Wales, to wear on a state visit to Australia in 1983. It was loaned to Elizabeth's daughter-in-law Sophie, then Countess of Wessex, in 2012.

=== Festoon Necklace ===
In 1947, George VI commissioned a three-strand necklace with over 150 brilliant cut diamonds from his inherited collection. It consists of three small rows of diamonds with a triangle motif. The minimum weight of this necklace is estimated to be 170 carats (34 g). The necklace was worn by Catherine, Princess of Wales at the coronation of Charles III in 2023.

=== King Khalid of Saudi Arabia Necklace ===
This necklace was given to Elizabeth II by King Khalid of Saudi Arabia in 1979. It is of the sunray design and contains both round and pear shaped diamonds. Like the King Faisal necklace, it was made by Harry Winston, and Elizabeth often lent the necklace to Diana, Princess of Wales.

=== Greville Ruby Floral Bandeau Necklace ===
This necklace was made in 1907 by Boucheron for Margaret Greville. It was a part of her 1942 bequest to Queen Elizabeth (later the Queen Mother), and Elizabeth's parents gave them to her in 1947 as a wedding present. She wore the necklace frequently in her younger years up until the 1980s. In 2017, it was loaned to the Duchess of Cambridge for a State Banquet for King Felipe VI of Spain. Elizabeth II wore it again for the first time in over 30 years in 2018 at a dinner as part of the Commonwealth Heads of Government Meeting.

=== Greville Festoon Necklace ===
Cartier had the piece designed as a 2-row necklace in 1929 but three more strands were added in 1938 at the owner's request. The piece was frequently worn by Queen Elizabeth the Queen Mother throughout her life. It was worn by the Duchess of Cornwall for the first time during the Commonwealth Heads of Government Meeting in 2007.

=== Nizam of Hyderabad Necklace ===
A diamond necklace made by Cartier in the 1930s. It was a gift to Elizabeth on her wedding to Prince Philip from the last Nizam of Hyderabad, Mir Osman Ali Khan, in 1947. The Nizam's entire gift set for the future Queen of the United Kingdom included a diamond tiara and matching necklace, whose design was based on English roses. The tiara has three floral brooches that can be detached and used separately. Catherine, Princess of Wales has also worn the necklace.

=== Coronation Necklace ===
Made for Queen Victoria in 1858 by Garrard & Co., the Coronation Necklace is 38 cm (15 in) long and consists of 25 cushion diamonds and the 22-carat (4.4 g) Lahore Diamond as a pendant. It has been used together with the Coronation Earrings by queens regnant and consort at every coronation since 1901.

=== Queen Victoria's Golden Jubilee Necklace ===
Presented to Queen Victoria by Louisa Montagu Douglas Scott, Duchess of Buccleuch on 30 July 1888 on behalf of the "Daughters of Her Empire". Made by Carrington & Co. in 1888.

=== Queen Alexandra's Collet Necklace ===
This necklace and a pair of matching earrings were given to Princess Alexandra as a wedding present from the City of London.

=== Queen Alexandra's Dagmar Necklace ===
This necklace was given to Princess Alexandra as a wedding present from King Frederick VII of Denmark. The necklace was made by the Danish Court Jeweller and modified by Garrard.

=== Diamond and Pearl Choker ===
The four-strand piece of "layered strings of cultured pearls" was originally given to Elizabeth from Japan in the 1970s. She wore it to many occasions, including Margaret Thatcher's 70th birthday in 1995. It was loaned to Diana, Princess of Wales, for one of her first engagements as a royal, as well as a 1982 banquet at Hampton Court Palace and a trip to the Netherlands in the same year. Later, the piece was loaned to the Duchess of Cambridge, who wore it to the 70th wedding anniversary of Elizabeth II and Prince Philip in 2017 as well as Philip's funeral in 2021. She later wore it for Elizabeth II's funeral in 2022.

=== South African Necklace ===
In 1947, Princess Elizabeth was presented with a necklace consisting of 21 diamonds from the South African government as a 21st birthday present. This was later shortened to 15 diamonds and the remainder was used to create a matching bracelet.

=== City of London Fringe Necklace ===
This necklace was a gift from the City of London to Princess Elizabeth on her marriage to Philip.

=== Delhi Durbar Necklace ===
This necklace was made by Garrards in 1911 for Queen Mary as part of a suite of jewellery made for the 1911 Delhi Durbar. The diamond pendant is the Cullinan VII, and the 9 cabochon emeralds are from a cache of 40 emeralds won by Princess Augusta, Duchess of Cambridge in a State lottery in Frankfurt.

== Bracelets ==
=== Queen Victoria's Bracelet ===
This large bracelet is made of five square foliage pieces. It was worn by Queen Victoria for her official Golden Jubilee portrait photograph. It was classified as an 'heirloom of the Crown' in 1858.

=== Queen Mary's Bangles ===
This pair of bangles were a wedding present from the Bombay Presidency. They were given to Princess Elizabeth by Queen Mary as a wedding present.

== Rings ==
=== Cullinan IX Ring ===
This ring was thought to be made by Garrards in 1911, and is made using the smallest of the main stones cut from the Cullinan diamond (4.4 carat pear-shaped diamond.

== Brooches ==
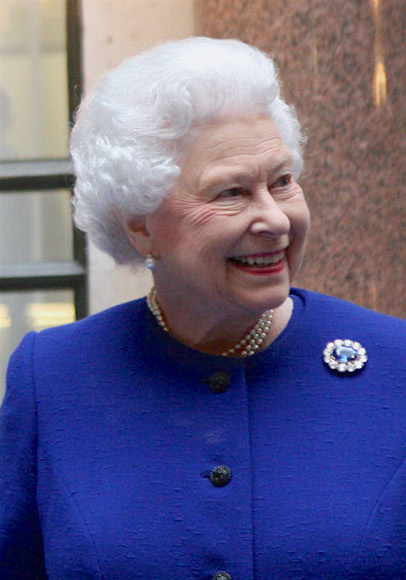
Elizabeth II wearing the Prince Albert Sapphire Brooch, 2012

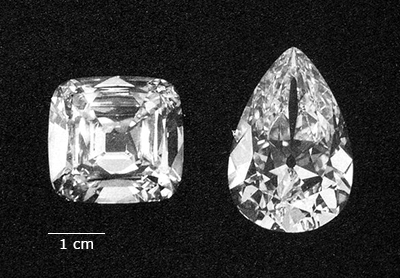
Cullinan diamonds IV and III

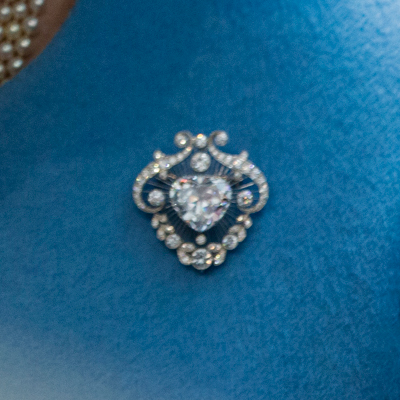
Cullinan V brooch

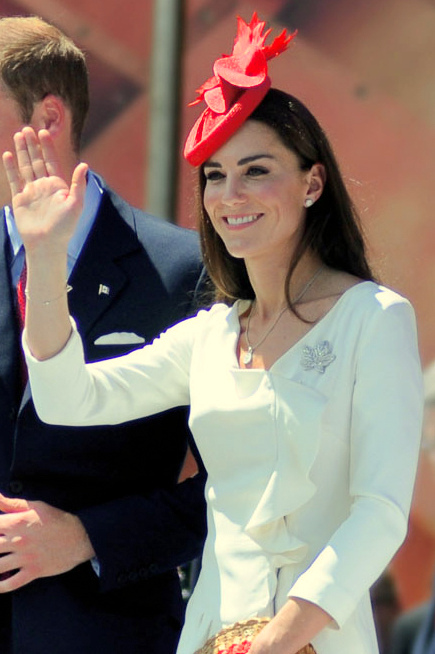
The Duchess of Cambridge (now the Princess of Wales) wearing the Maple leaf brooch, 2011

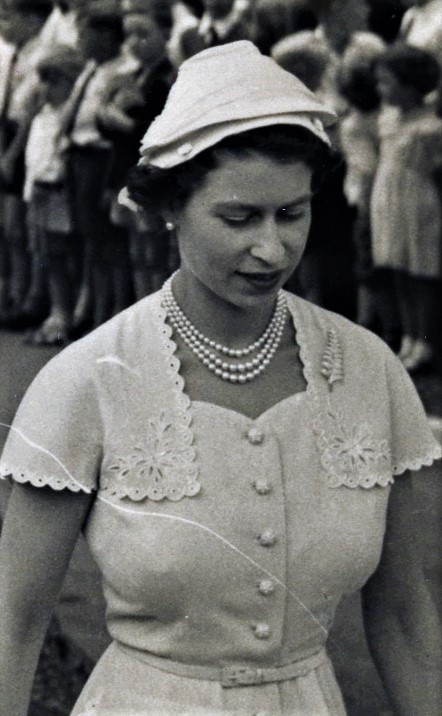
The Queen wearing the New Zealand Silver Fern Brooch during the Royal tour of New Zealand, 1953

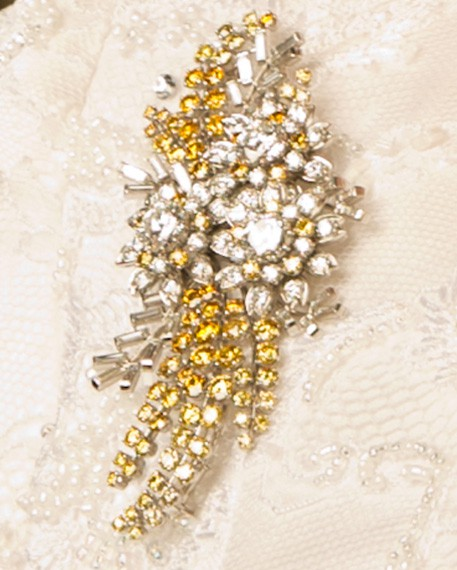
Australian Wattle Spray Brooch

=== Queen Adelaide's Brooch ===
The brooch was made by Rundell, Bridge & Co. in 1831. It was originally commissioned by William IV for Queen Adelaide as a clasp to a necklace. Subsequent Queens have always worn it as a brooch. It is classified as an "heirloom of the Crown" and was inherited by Queen Elizabeth II in 1952.

=== Prince Albert Sapphire Brooch ===
The Prince Albert sapphire brooch was given by Prince Albert to Queen Victoria at Buckingham Palace on 9 February 1840. It was the day before their wedding, and Victoria wrote in her diary that Albert came to her sitting room and gave her "a beautiful sapphire and diamond brooch".

=== Queen Victoria's Diamond Fringe Brooch ===
This piece is made out of "nine chains pave-set with brilliant-cut diamonds" at the bottom and larger diamonds put together at the top, which were given to Queen Victoria by the Ottoman Sultan Abdulmejid I in 1856. The piece was frequently worn by Queen Elizabeth the Queen Mother, and after her death it formed part of Elizabeth II's collection.

=== Queen Victoria's Bow Brooches ===
These brooches were made in 1858 for Queen Victoria by R. & S. Garrard & Co. They were designated as "heirlooms of the Crown" by Queen Victoria.

=== Queen Victoria's Wheat-Ear Brooches ===
Six wheat-ear brooches or hair ornaments were commissioned by William IV for Queen Adelaide, and made in 1830 by Rundell, Bridge & Co. Three were remade in 1858 after the successful Hanover claim. They were designated heirlooms of the crown by Queen Victoria.

=== Queen Victoria's Diamond Jubilee Brooch ===
Made by Garrard in 1897, and was given to her by her Household as part of her Diamond Jubilee celebrations. It was designated as an "heirloom of the Crown" by Queen Victoria.

=== Queen Mary's Dorset Bow Brooch ===
Made out of gold and silver and set with pave-set brilliants and a hinged pendant loop, the brooch resembles a ribbon-tied bow. The piece was made in 1893 by Carrington & Co. as a wedding present by County of Dorset to Mary, Duchess of York (later Queen Mary). Mary gave the brooch to her granddaughter Princess Elizabeth (later Elizabeth II) in 1947 as a wedding present.

=== Duchess of Cambridge's Pearl Pendant Brooch ===
Made by Garrard for Augusta, Duchess of Cambridge, it features a large pearl surrounded by a cluster of diamonds. Hanging from it as a pendant is a smaller pearl. It was inherited by Augusta's daughter, Mary Adelaide, Duchess of Teck, who passed it on to her daughter, Queen Mary. The piece had been worn occasionally by Queen Elizabeth II and appeared in the first formal joint portrait of Catherine, Duchess of Cambridge, with her husband Prince William.

=== Richmond Brooch ===
The Richmond Brooch was made by Hunt and Roskell in 1893, and given to Queen Mary as a wedding present. She wore it on her honeymoon, and bequeathed it to Elizabeth after her death. It features "diamonds, set with two pearls—one large round center pearl and the detachable pearl", as well as a pear-shaped, pearl-drop component that is removable. The grand diamond piece is one of the largest within Elizabeth II's collection. Elizabeth had worn it to many evening receptions and engagements, including the 2018 Festival of Remembrance and the 2021 funeral of her husband.

=== Cullinan III & IV ("Granny's Chips") ===
Cullinan III and IV are two of several stones cut from the Cullinan Diamond in 1905. The large diamond, found in South Africa, was presented to Edward VII on his 66th birthday. Two of the stones cut from the diamond were the 94.4-carat (18.88 g) Cullinan III, a clear pear-shaped stone, and a 63.6-carat (12.72 g) cushion-shaped stone. Queen Mary had these stones made into a brooch with the Cullinan III hanging from IV. Elizabeth II inherited the brooch in 1953 from her grandmother. On 25 March 1958, while she and Prince Philip were on a state visit to the Netherlands, she revealed that Cullinan III and IV are known in her family as "Granny's Chips". The couple visited the Asscher Diamond Company, where the Cullinan had been cut 50 years earlier. It was the first time the Queen had publicly worn the brooch. During her visit, she unpinned the brooch and offered it for examination to Louis Asscher, the brother of Joseph Asscher who had originally cut the diamond. Elderly and almost blind, Asscher was deeply moved by her bringing the diamonds, knowing how much it would mean to him seeing them again after so many years.

=== Cullinan V ===
The smaller 18.8-carat (3.76 g) Cullinan V is a heart-shaped diamond cut from the same rough gem as III and IV. It is set in the centre of a platinum brooch that formed a part of the stomacher made for Queen Mary to wear at the Delhi Durbar in 1911. The brooch was designed to show off Cullinan V and is pavé-set with a border of smaller diamonds. It can be suspended from the VIII brooch and can be used to suspend the VII pendant. It was often worn like this by Mary who left all the brooches to Elizabeth when she died in 1953.

=== Cullinan VI and VIII Brooch ===
The Cullinan VI stone (11.5 carats) was bought for Queen Alexandra by Edward VII in 1908. Since Queen Mary inherited it, it has been worn as a pendant to the Cullinan VIII brooch (6.8 carats).

=== Diamond Maple Leaf Brooch ===
The piece was crafted by J. W. Histed Diamonds Ltd. in Vancouver, Canada. It holds baguette-cut diamonds mounted in platinum, formed in the shape of the sugar maple tree leaf, the national emblem of Canada. The brooch was originally presented to Queen Elizabeth (later the Queen Mother) on her tour of Canada with her husband in 1939. The piece was worn by Elizabeth II, then a princess, on her 1951 trip to Canada, and multiple instances since both within the country and in Britain. It was worn by the Duchess of Cornwall (now Queen Camilla) on her trips to the nation in 2009 and 2012. The Duchess of Cambridge (now the Princess of Wales) has worn it during both her tours of Canada in 2011 and 2016.

=== The Queen's Cartier Aquamarine Clips ===
This pair of aquamarine and diamond clips was given to Princess Elizabeth as an 18th birthday present by her parents.

=== New Zealand Silver Fern Brooch ===
The brooch was given to Elizabeth II by Annie Allum, wife of John Allum, Mayor of Auckland, during her 1953–1954 royal tour of New Zealand, as a Christmas present "from the women of Auckland". It is "bejewelled with round brilliant and baguette shaped diamonds", having been designed to form the shape of a silver fern, an emblem of New Zealand. Various members of the royal family have worn the piece on visits to the country, including the Duchess of Cambridge.

=== Australian Wattle Spray Brooch ===
The Queen owns a Wattle brooch, which was gifted to her by Prime Minister Robert Menzies on behalf of the Government and people of Australia on her first visit in 1954. Made of platinum, and set with yellow and white diamonds, the brooch is in the form of a spray of golden wattle and tea tree blossoms, both Australian symbols. The Queen had worn the brooch many times on her visits to Australia, for instance, at the Randwick Racecourse in Sydney in 1970, Sydney Opera House in 2000, and during her arrival to Canberra in 2006 and 2011, or to Australia-related events in Britain.

=== Sapphire Jubilee Snowflake Brooch ===
The Governor General of Canada, David Johnston, presented Elizabeth II with the Sapphire Jubilee Snowflake Brooch at a celebration of Canada's sesquicentennial at Canada House on 19 July 2017 as a gift from the Government of Canada to celebrate her Sapphire jubilee and to commemorate Canada 150. Johnston presented her with the brooch moments before she and the Duke of Edinburgh unveiled a new Jubilee Walkway panel outside Canada House. The brooch was designed as a companion to the diamond maple leaf brooch, the piece was made by Hillberg and Berk of Saskatchewan and consists of sapphires from a cache found in 2002 on Baffin Island by brothers Seemeega and Nowdluk Aqpik.

=== Infinity Isle of Man Brooch ===
To mark her Platinum Jubilee, the Manx government gave the Queen a brooch in the shape of the island, made there by Element Isle. The 'Infinity Isle of Man' brooch design outlines the Island with four gems (Blue Topaz, Citrine, Amethyst and Emerald) representing the towns of Ramsey, Peel, Castletown and the city of Douglas. The colours of the stones were selected to represent Manx tartan.

=== Greville Scroll Brooch ===
Made by Cartier in 1929, the piece features "three pearls anchoring a simple diamond-flecked scroll design" and was worn by the Queen Mother who eventually passed it down to the Queen.

=== Sri Lankan Trumpet Brooch ===
Gifted by the mayor of Colombo to the Queen during her state visit in 1981, the piece features "pink, blue and yellow sapphires, garnets, rubies and aquamarine."

== Parures ==
A parure is a set of matching jewellery to be used together which first became popular in 17th-century Europe.

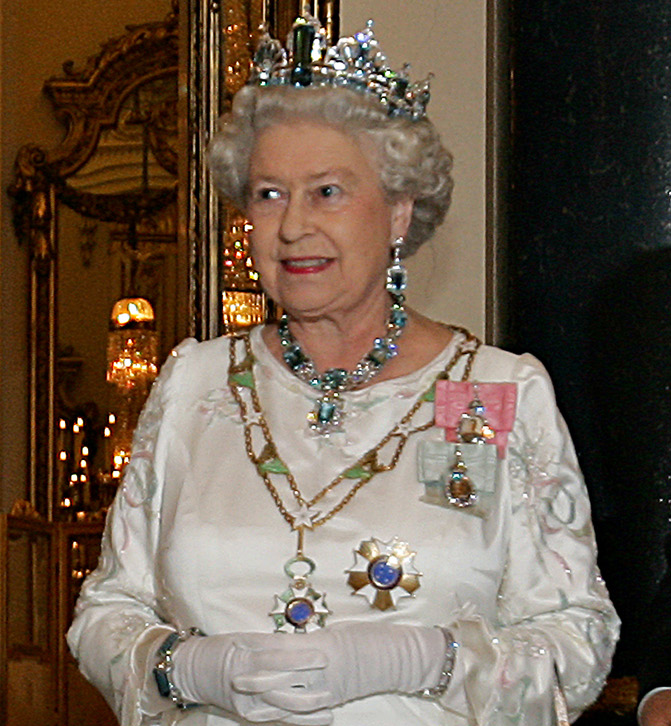
Elizabeth II wearing the Aquamarine Tiara with the Brazil necklace, earrings and bracelet

=== The Kent Demi-Parure ===
This set of jewellery was owned by Queen Victoria's mother, the Duchess of Kent and Strathearn. The set consists of a necklace, three brooches, a pair of earrings, and a pair of haircombs.

=== Brazil Parure ===
The Brazil Parure is one of the newest items of jewellery in the collection. In 1953, the president and people of Brazil presented Elizabeth II with the coronation gift of a necklace and matching pendant earrings of aquamarines and diamonds. It had taken the jewellers Mappin & Webb an entire year to collect the perfectly matched stones. The necklace has nine large oblong aquamarines with an even bigger aquamarine pendant drop. Elizabeth II had the drop set in a more decorative diamond cluster and it is now detachable. She was so delighted with the gift that in 1957 she had a tiara made to match the necklace. The tiara is surmounted by three vertically set aquamarines. Seeing that she had so liked the original Coronation gift that she had a matching tiara made, the Government of Brazil decided to add to its gift, and in 1958 it presented her with a bracelet of oblong aquamarines set in a cluster of diamonds, and a square aquamarine and diamond brooch.

=== George VI Victorian Suite ===
The George VI Victorian Suite was originally a wedding present by George VI to his daughter Elizabeth in 1947. The suite consists of a long necklace of oblong sapphires and diamonds and a pair of matching square sapphire earrings also bordered with diamonds. The suite was originally made in 1850. The stones exactly matched the colour of the robes of the Order of the Garter. Elizabeth had the necklace shortened by removing the biggest sapphire in 1952, and later had a new pendant made using the removed stone. In 1963, a new sapphire and diamond tiara and bracelet were made to match the original pieces. The tiara is made out of a necklace that had belonged to Princess Louise of Belgium, daughter of Leopold II. In 1969, Elizabeth wore the complete parure to a charity concert.

=== Queen Alexandra Wedding Parure ===
This set, a larger diamond and pearl parure made by Garrard in 1862, was commissioned by Albert Edward, Prince of Wales (later Edward VII) for his bride Alexandra of Denmark. It included an all-diamond tiara with knot and fleur-de-lis motifs, accompanied by a necklace, a brooch, and a pair of earrings, which feature button-style pearl and diamond clusters and pear-shaped pearl pendants. On Alexandra's death, the tiara, known as the "Rundell Tiara", passed to her daughter Princess Victoria, and was disposed of by her. The rest of the parure was passed down to Queen Mary, who wore the brooch and lent the necklace to her daughter-in-law the Duchess of York (later Queen Elizabeth the Queen Mother). The necklace became a favourite of hers, and upon her death it was bequeathed to Elizabeth II, who lent it to her granddaughter-in-law the Duchess of Cambridge.

=== Greville Emerald Suite ===
The exact origin of the suite, which consists of an emerald necklace and emerald earrings, is unknown. The necklace features square-cut emeralds set in diamond clusters, and the earrings consist of pear-shaped cabochon emeralds suspended from diamond studs. The suite was frequently worn by the Queen Mother and later passed on to the Queen.

=== Dubai Sapphire Suite ===
In 1979, the ruler of Dubai, Sheikh Rashid bin Saeed Al Maktoum, gifted the Queen a suite from Asprey, which included a necklace of diamond loops, a pair of earrings and a ring, during the Queen's tour of the Gulf States. The earrings were worn by the Duchess of Cambridge at a movie screening in 2021.

=== Emerald Tassel Suite ===
First worn by the Queen in the 1980s, the suite consists of a necklace, a pair of earrings, a bracelet, and a ring. The earrings and the bracelet were worn by the Duchess of Cambridge during a tour of Jamaica in 2022. She wore the earrings and the necklace, as Princess of Wales, during a trip to India in 2026.

== 1937 coronets ==
For the coronation of their parents in 1937, it was decided that Elizabeth and Margaret should be given small versions of crowns to wear at the ceremony. Ornate coronets of gold lined with crimson and edged with ermine were designed by Garrard & Co. and brought to the royal couple for inspection. However, the King and Queen decided they were inappropriately elaborate and too heavy for the young princesses. Queen Mary suggested the coronets be silver-gilt in a medieval style with no decorations. George VI agreed, and the coronets were designed with Maltese crosses and fleurs-de-lis. After the coronation, Mary wrote: "I sat between Maud and Lilibet (Elizabeth), and Margaret came next. They looked too sweet in their lace dresses and robes, especially when they put on their coronets". The coronation ensembles are in the Royal Collection Trust.

== See also ==
- Williamson pink diamond
- Canadian royal clothing and jewellery
- Crown Jewels of the United Kingdom
- Jewels of Diana, Princess of Wales
- George IV State Diadem
- Royal Family Order
- Jewels of Mary, Queen of Scots
- Jewels of Anne of Denmark

== Bibliography ==
- Field, Leslie (2002). The Queen's Jewels: The Personal Collection of Elizabeth II. London: Harry N. Abrams. ISBN 978-0-8109-8172-0.
