= House of Bolin =

Luxury jewelry company from Stockholm

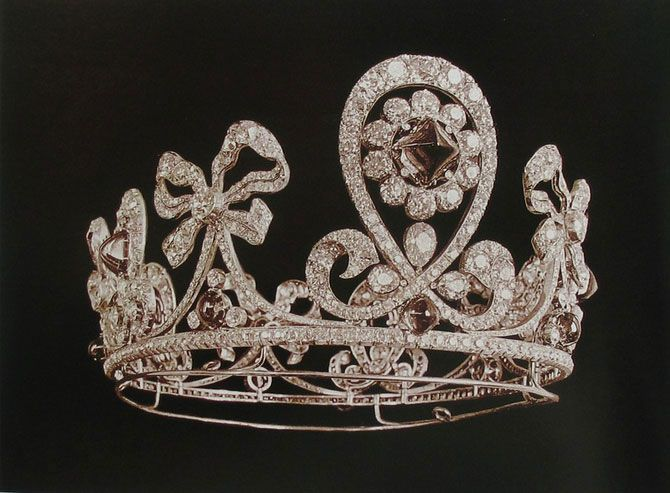
- House of Bolin headset with emerald cabochons from around 1900.
- Industry: Jewellery
- Founder: Andreas Roempler
- Website: www.bolin.se/en/

The House of Bolin (also known as W.A. Bolin) is one of the oldest firms specialising in jewellery and silverware that remains in the hands of its founding family. The firm exists today as Jewellers and Silversmiths to HM the King of Sweden.

== History ==
=== Russian Imperial Court ===
The firm's archives once dated as far back as 1796, and its founder, the German-born jeweller Andreas Roempler, was established in St. Petersburg as early as 1790. In the registers of the German colony of this city he is called Master of Diamonds. He became a manufacturing jeweller of the Court by 1796 and functioned as official Appraiser to the Russian Imperial Court starting in 1823.

Bolin rapidly became the most important jeweller in St. Petersburg. At the peak of his activity, he supplied more to the Imperial Court than all other jewellers put together. Towards the end of the nineteenth century some of the leading Paris houses, in particular Boucheron, established themselves in Russia, and were granted commissions. From the 1890s, Bolin's main competitor was Fabergé, and although the Bolins continued to make most of the large pieces of jewellery for the Court, Fabergé surpassed Bolin in numbers and possibly also in turnover. The total invoiced was 339,400 roubles.

=== The Bolin dynasty ===
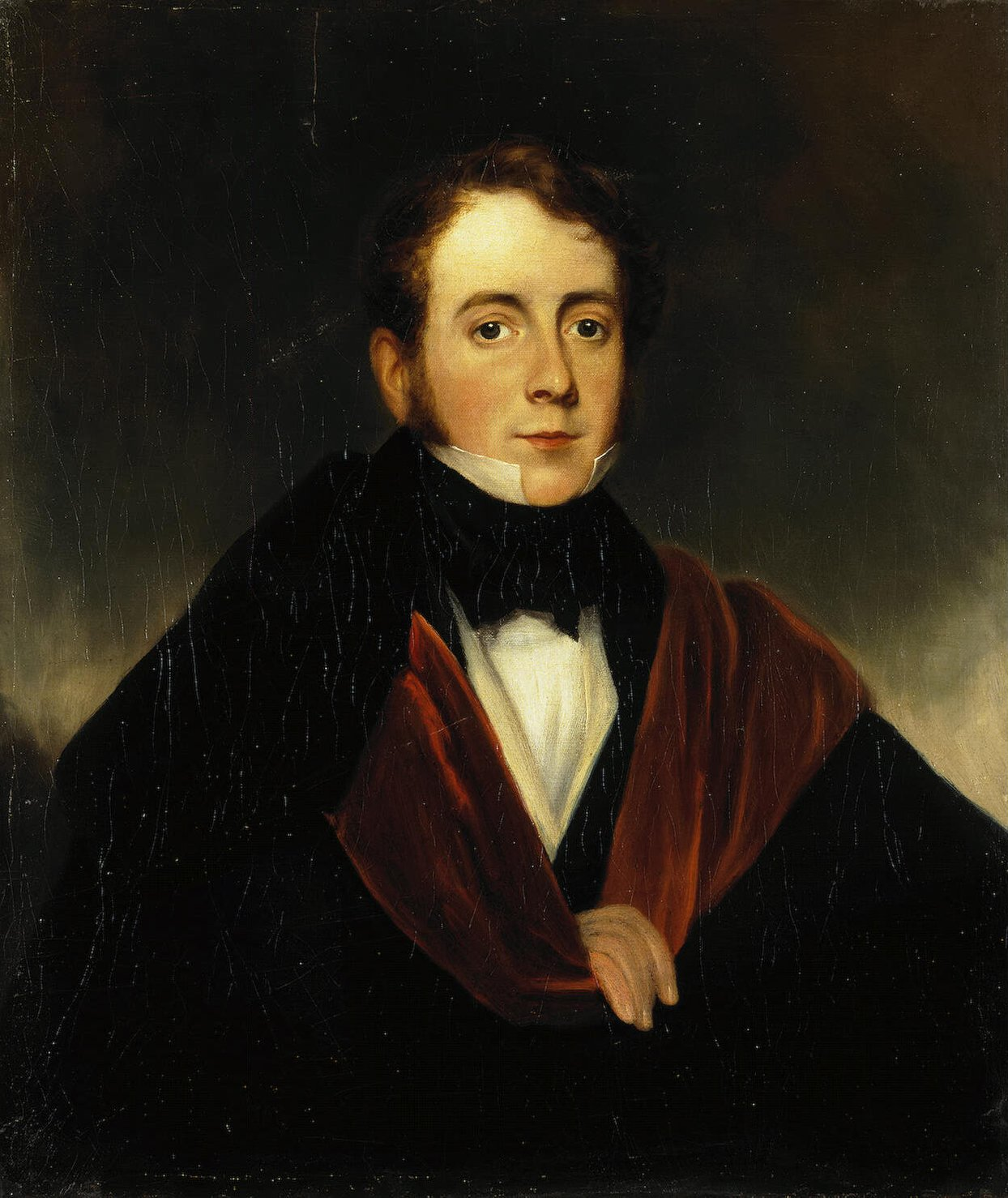
Carl Edvard Bolin 1805-1864, by unknown artist, 1830s

His eldest daughter, Sofia, married Gottlieb Ernst Jahn, a goldsmith, who subsequently became Roempler's partner. Jahn is known to have supplied an opal and diamond jewellery suite, comprising a tiara, necklace and bracelet, at the occasion of the christening of Grand Duke Nicholas Nikolaevich of Russia on 17 May 1834. The price of 169,601 roubles was the highest ever paid for a christening gift in the nineteenth century.

In 1833 Carl Edvard Bolin arrived in St. Petersburg from Stockholm and began to work for Andreas Roempler. In 1834 he married Ernestine Catharina, another daughter of the recently deceased Roempler, becoming a full partner at the occasion of his marriage. The firm was henceforth named Jahn & Bolin. Brother-in-law Jahn died in 1836, leaving Bolin as partner to Jahn's widow. In 1839 the partners submitted a request to become Jewellers to the Imperial Court, which was granted. Many of the parures of the Empresses and Grand Duchesses were tailored by Bolin, now the main owner of the company.

In 1836 Henrik Conrad, then only sixteen years old, joined his elder brother in St. Petersburg, staying with Carl Edvard until 1852 when he opened a shop of his own in Moscow in partnership with an Englishman, James Steuart Shanks. Their shop was called Shanks & Bolin, Magasin Anglais, and was situated on the exclusive Kuznetski Most. They sold not only jewellery and silverware (this being Henrik Conrad's department) but also ladies' luxury accessories such as handbags, gloves, plumes, luxurious underwear, etc. This partnership did not last long and Henrik Conrad continued the business alone, though the Shanks and Bolin name continued on silverware until the 1880s. His specialty was fine silverware which he manufactured and sold in Moscow and with which he supplied his St. Petersburg relatives. Originally the silver workshop was run by Maria Linke, and later by her son, Konstantin.

In 1864 Carl Edvard Bolin died in St. Petersburg, leaving his part of the firm in the hands of his sons Gustaf and Edward.

=== Art Nouveau ===
When Henrik Conrad died in 1888 in Moscow, he left everything to his three daughters. His sons, in his opinion, had received an expensive upbringing and training which was to be their sole legacy. To make it possible to continue the business, his eldest son Wilhelm James Andreevitch Bolin opened a branch for his St. Petersburg cousins called C. E. Bolin. He continued on his own in Moscow, very much in the old tradition and was especially interested in silverware, bringing in young French sculptors as designers and making magnificent pieces in the somewhat overladen style of the 1880s. Eventually, he adopted the Art Nouveau style, often combining glass (Lalique), ceramics and cut crystal with silver mounts. In 1912 he took over the Moscow shop in his own name W.A. Bolin.

In St. Petersburg the two brothers, Gustaf and Edward, who in 1912 had been granted the title of hereditary noblemen with the right to bear a coat-of-arms, continued as one of the foremost jewellery houses. Sadly, Gustaf died in 1916, creating a vacuum, as neither he nor his brother Edward had any heirs wishing to take over the business. Wilhelm Bolin, who had two sons, was interested. However, the Russian Revolution put an end to such plans.

=== Transfer to Sweden ===
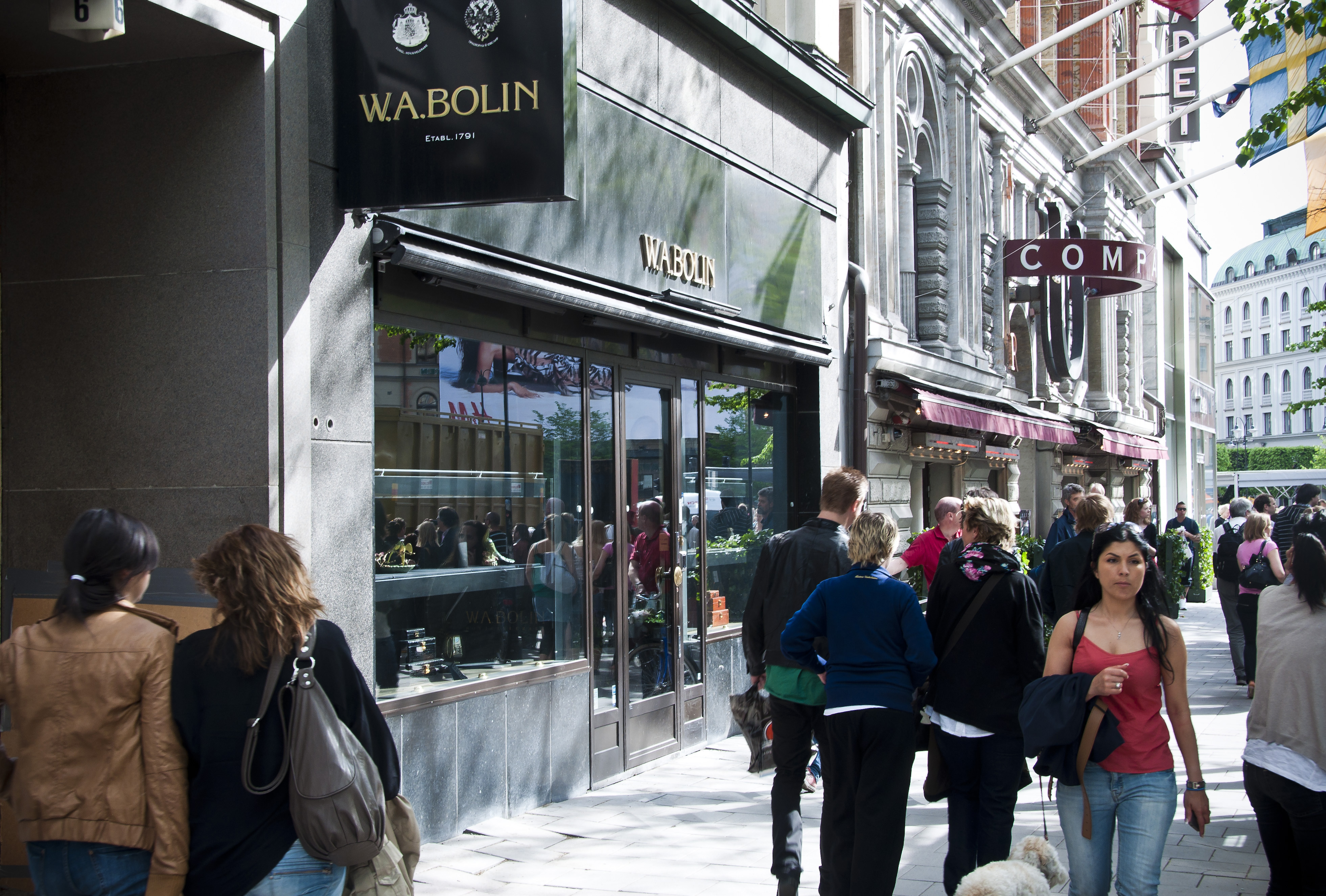
W.A. Bolin's shop in Stockholm

Vasily Bolin, like his father, kept his Swedish citizenship. In 1904 he purchased a property in the south of Sweden which he visited each summer together with his family. Showing foresight, he opened a branch office in Bad Homburg in Germany in 1912 - a spa visited by the Tsar and his family. Shortly before WWI, Vasily Bolin had decided to open shop in Germany, but remained stuck there when the war broke out, and while transiting in Stockholm to try to reach St-Petersburg, he made an agreement with a banker to open a shop in the city. The company's stocks in Germany were transferred in Sweden.

None of the archives of the Bolin firm have, as yet, been found. A number of invoices from Bolin to the Imperial Court have been discovered in the Imperial Archives in St. Petersburg. There may be more and research has been initiated to locate both them and Bolin's own records. During the Bolshevik overthrow, account books were confiscated, Bolin jewellery owners were tracked and the gems were stolen as war chest. Some Bolin pieces belonging to royal members were put in a safe place in the Swedish embassy in St-Petersburg, and later transferred to Stockholm where it was hidden in the Foreign Ministry’s storage rooms, and forgotten until 2008 when the ministry moved its archives. Maria Pavlovna died in 1920 and never told her family about the jewels in Stockholm.

The firm exists today as Jewellers and Silversmiths to HM King Carl XVI Gustav.

Bolin created the engagement ring worn by Victoria, Crown Princess of Sweden prior to her 2010 wedding with Prince Daniel. In November 2016, Anni-Frid Lyngstad auctioned some of her Bolin jewellery, including a collier and bangle in 18k white gold with cultured pearls and diamonds (made in 1995), estimated at around $60K.

== The Vladimir Tiara ==
After the revolution, British diplomats helped recover some of the Russian Court jewelry, and the Vladimir Tiara, a diamond diadem with large pearl pendants that originally belonged to Grand Duchess Maria Pavlovna, was bought by Queen Mary, wife to King George V, in 1921.

== Gallery ==
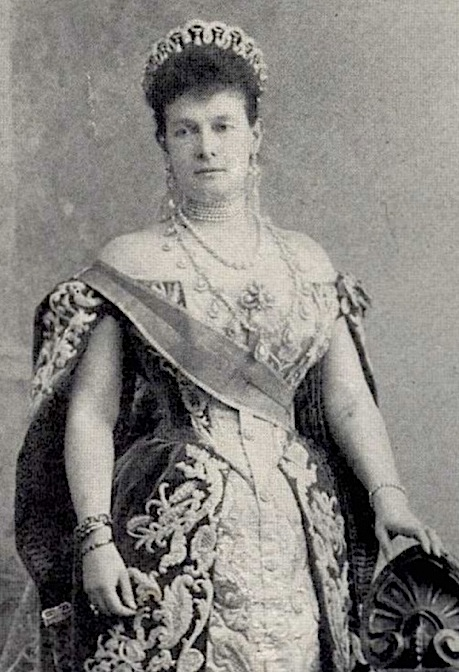
Grand Duchess Maria Pavlovna of Russia wearing the Vladimir Tiara

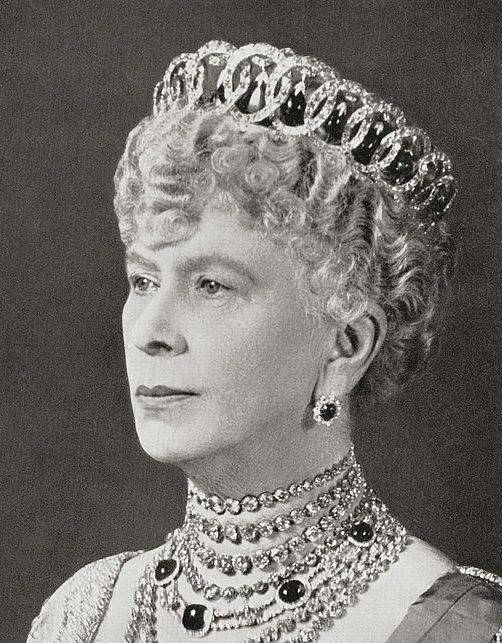
Queen Mary in 1934 wearing the Vladimir Tiara

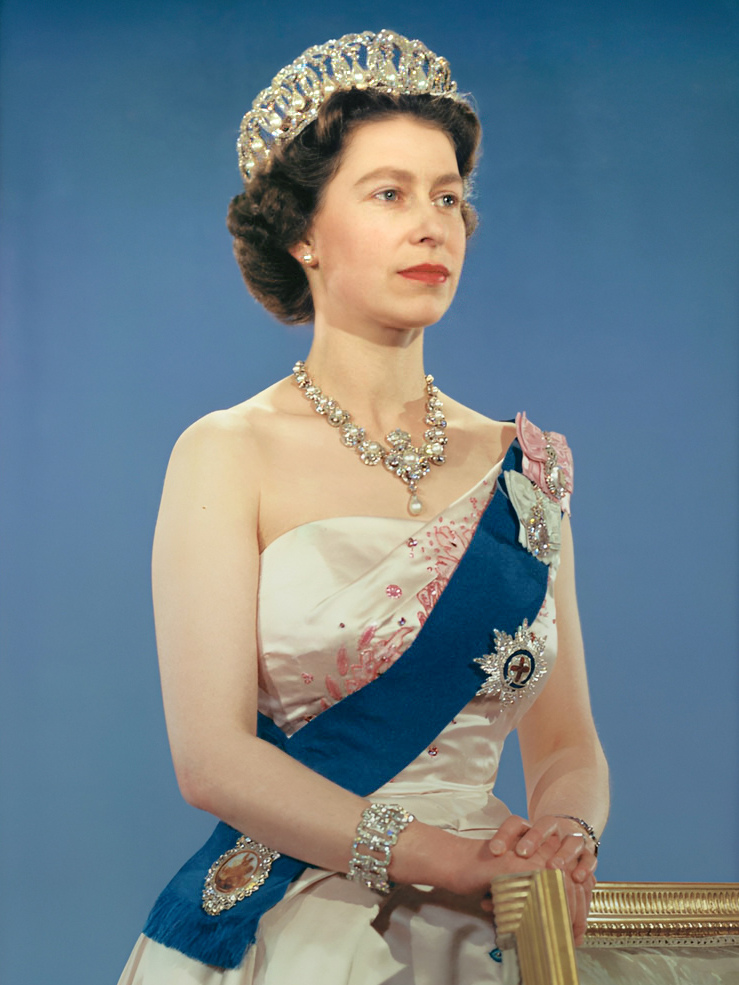
Queen Elizabeth II in 1959 wearing the Vladimir tiara

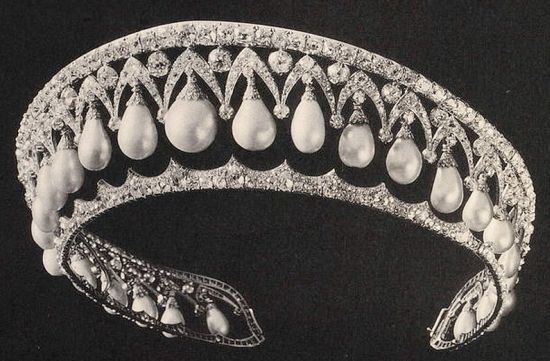
The Russian beauty - The diadem in the form of a kokoshnik was ordered by Emperor Nicholas I for his wife Alexandra Feodorovna in 1841. Made by jeweler Carl Edvard Bolin from platinum, diamonds and large teardrop pearls.

== Sources ==
- About WA Bolin (23.04.2009)
- Hill, Gerard; Smorodinova G.G. and Ulyanova, B.L.; Fabergé and the Russian master Goldsmiths (2008)
- Watts, Geoffrey; Russian Silversmiths' Hallmarks (1700 to 1917) (2006)
- М.М. Постникова-Лосева, Н.Г.П. Платонова, Б.Л. Ульяноа, ЗОЛОТОЕ И СЕРЕБРЯНОЕ ДЕЛО XV-XX вв. (2003)

== See also ==
=== Related pages ===
- Vladimir Tiara

=== Bibliography ===
- Bolin (1996). Smycken & Silver för tsarer, drottningar och andra.

=== External links ===
- Company website
