= Schenken =

Schenken is a surname. Notable people with the surname include:

- Howard Schenken (1903–1979), American bridge player
- Tim Schenken (born 1943), Australian race car driver

== See also ==
- Schenke
