= Shenk =

Shenk is a surname. Notable people with the surname include:

- Thomas Shenk, professor of Molecular Biology at Princeton University.
- Henry Shenk, American football coach.
- David Shenk, American writer, lecturer, and filmmaker.
- Sol Shenk, American businessman, founder of the discount retail chain Big Lots.

== See also ==
- Schenck
- Schenk
- Shank (disambiguation)
