= F & R Shanks =

Coachbuilding business in London

F & R Shanks was a coachbuilding business which flourished in 19th century central London. It began as a partnership of Robert Shanks and Robert How (How's sister married Robert Shanks). Sons of Anne How and Robert Shanks, Frederick Shanks and Robert How Shanks, took over the business in the 1850s.

The coachbuilding business was first established, where operations remained until 1905, at Great Queen Street in Lincoln's Inn Fields. Shortly before the end of the 19th century most activities were moved to Parker Street in neighbouring Long Acre where F & R Shanks manufactured motor car bodies.

There was a showroom at 30 New Bond Street.

The business closed in 1917.

See also Shanks & Bolin, Magasin Anglais
