= Emily Shanks =

British painter (1857–1936)

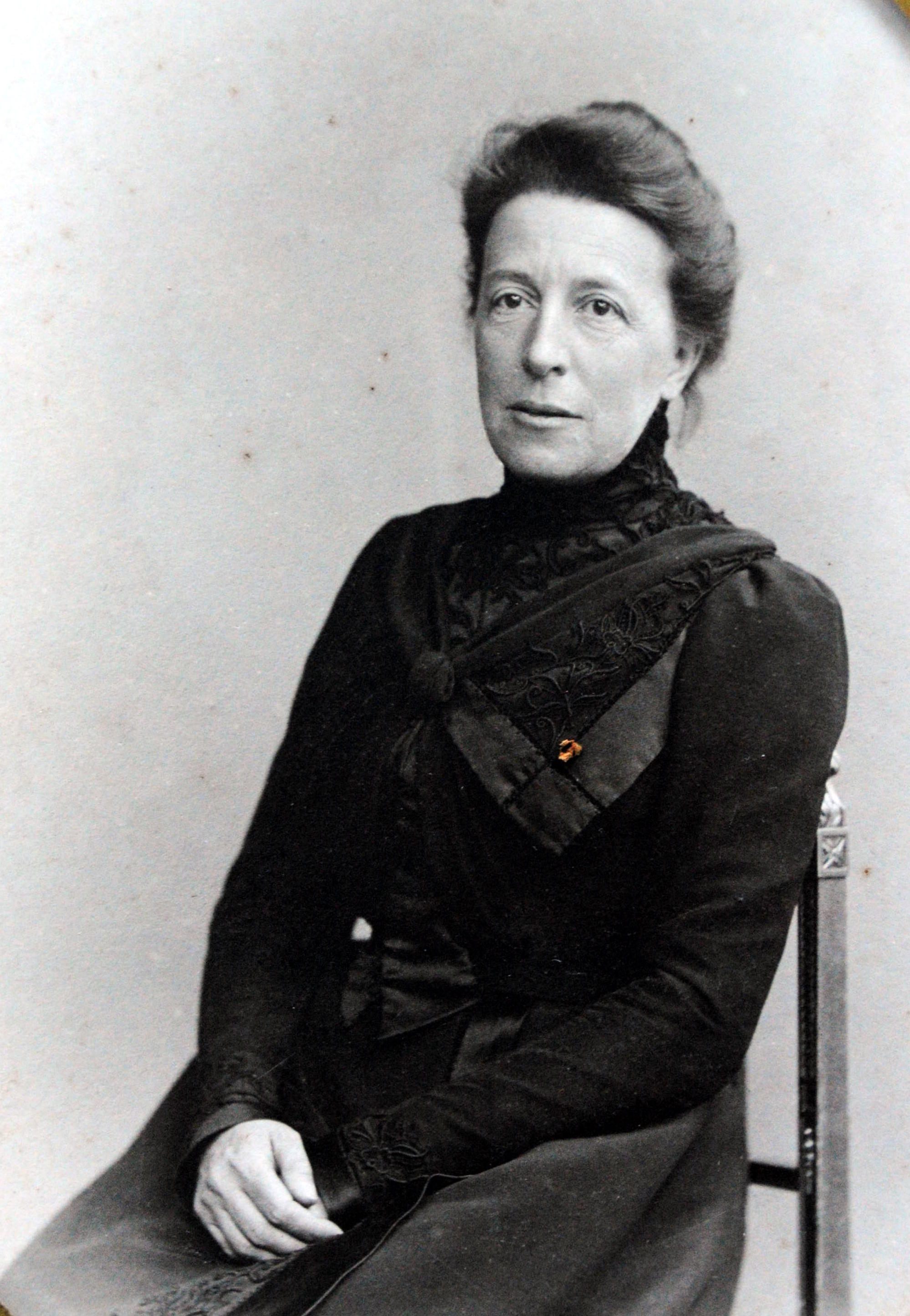
Shanks c. 1900

Emily Shanks, also known in Russian sources as Emiliya Yakovlevna Shanks (Russian: Эми́лия Я́ковлевна Шанкс; 1 August 1857, in Moscow – 13 January 1936, in London), was an English painter, active in Moscow during the reigns of Alexander III and Nicholas II. She was the first woman to be elected to the Peredvizhniki Company.

== Early life ==
Emily Shanks was born in Moscow, the second daughter of James Steuart Shanks and Mary Louisa Schilling. James arrived in Moscow in 1852 where he went into partnership with Swede Henrik Conrad Bolin to found Shanks & Bolin, Magasin Anglais (The English Shop). The shop was financially successful and the Shanks family led a comfortable life allowing the daughters the time and means to engage with the Moscow intelligentsia.

Emily's older sister Louise Shanks married Aylmer Maude and translated Tolstoy's novels into English; these translations were published by the Oxford University Press and were considered the best translations of their day. Emily's younger sister Mary was a friend of Tolstoy's eldest daughter Tatyana; the visitor book records that both Emily and Mary were visitors to the Tolstoy family home.

Emily commenced her studies at the Moscow School of Painting, Sculpture and Architecture around 1882 where she was instructed by prominent members of the Peredvizhniki: Vasily Polenov, Vladimir Makovsky and Illarion Pryanishnikov. In 1890 she was awarded a "large silver medal" by the Moscow School of Painting, Sculpture and Architecture for her painting Reading a letter. She graduated that year with the rank of 'artist'.

== The Peredvizhniki and the Polenov circle ==
Shanks formed a friendship with the Russian painter and designer Yelena Polenova and her brother Vasily Polenov. Emily and her sister Mary would regularly paint together with the Polenovs, this is particularly well documented in the Polenov letters from the winter of 1891–1892. In 1891 Emily’s painting Older Brother (Старший брат) was accepted by the Peredvizhniki for exhibition. On 7 March 1891 Vasily Polenov wrote to his wife Natalia Polenov that this painting had caught the attention of the Tsarina Alexandra Feodorovna who expressed interest.

In 1892 Shanks's painting New Girl at School was accepted by the Peredvizhniki for exhibition. The painting was lauded by Ilya Repin and subsequently sold to Pavel Tretyakov and is still owned by the Tretyakov Gallery. In 1894 Shanks was elected to membership of the Peredvizhniki for her the painting Inkspot. She became the first woman to be elected as a full member of the Peredvizhniki.

From 1891 to 1915 Shanks exhibited with the Peredvizhniki at 19 of their exhibitions. Shanks also exhibited with The Moscow Union of Artists and the Moscow Society for Lovers of the Arts and the Moscow Lemercier Gallery

== Exile from Russia ==
At the outbreak of World War I Emily and most of the Shanks family moved back to London. The family business and home were lost during the Russian Revolution. In 1916 and 1918 she exhibited her work at the summer exhibition at Royal Academy of Arts. She showed two paintings: 1916 A bit of Moscow and 1918 Peaceful Moscow. Shanks died on 13 January 1936, aged 78 years, at Holland Road, Kensington.

== Paintings ==
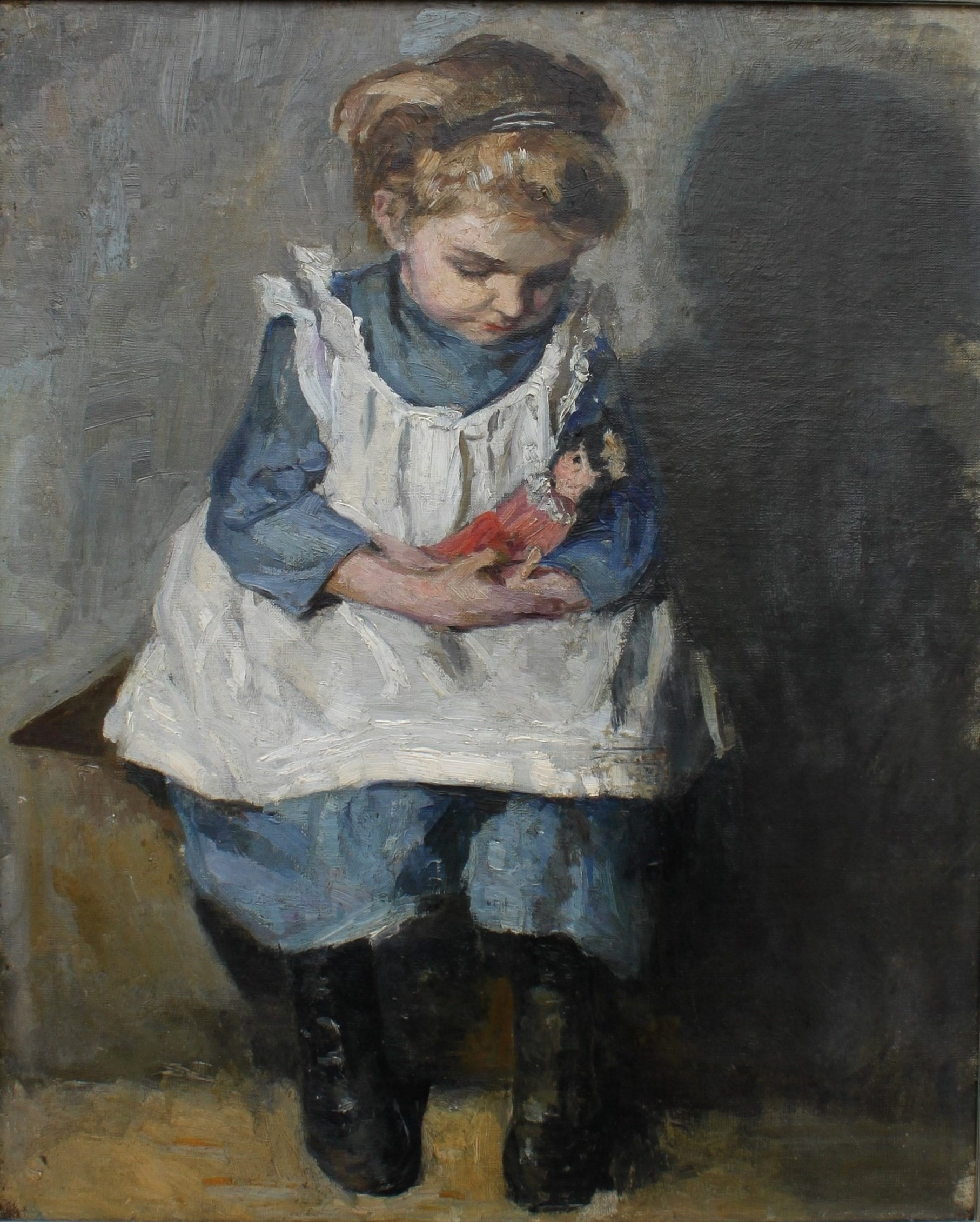
Nanny (ca. 1900), oil on canvas – private collection

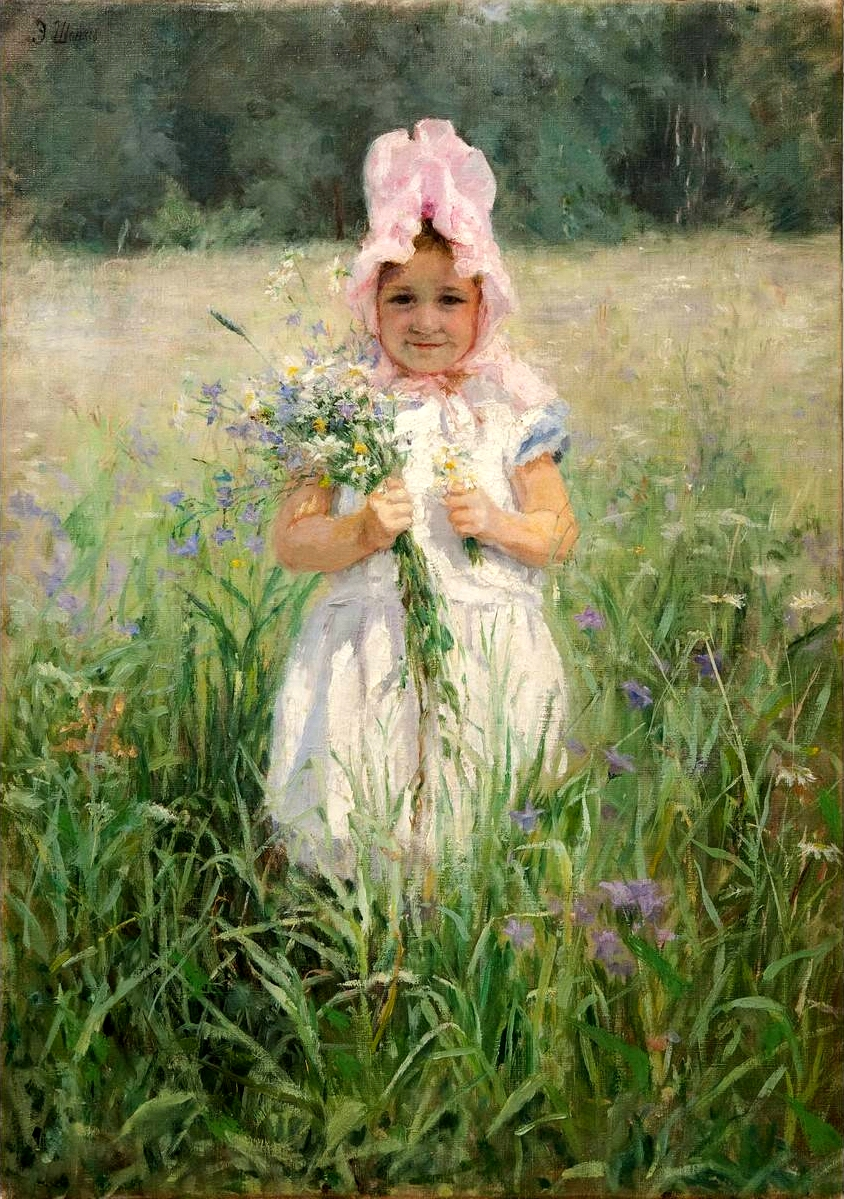
'In the colors' (Portrait of the daughter of Vasily Polenov), (between 1890 and 1900), oil on canvas – private collection

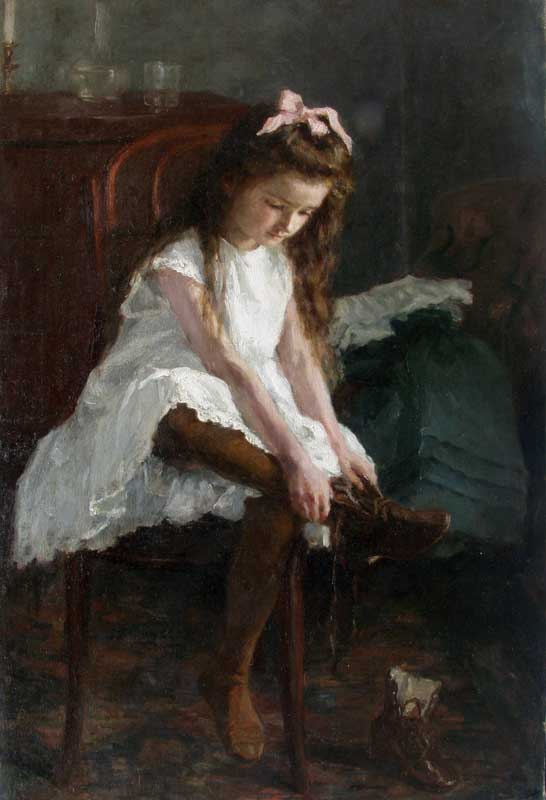
Girl, (between 1880 and 1915), oil on canvas – private collection

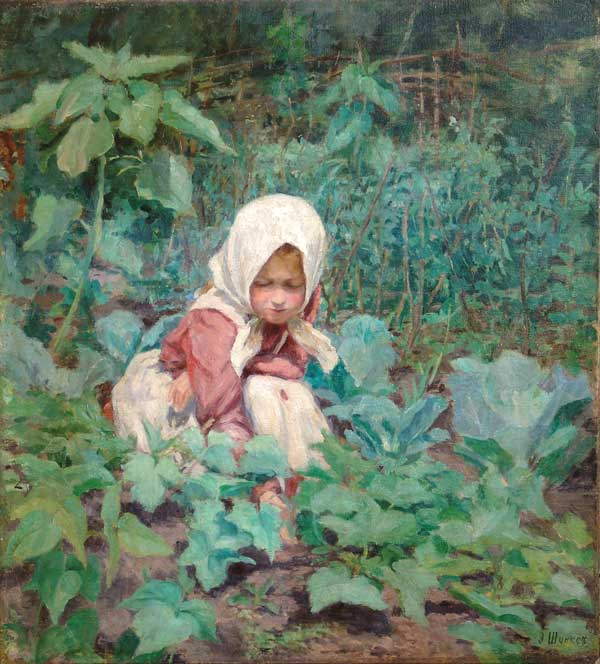
Girl picking cucumbers, oil on canvas – private collection

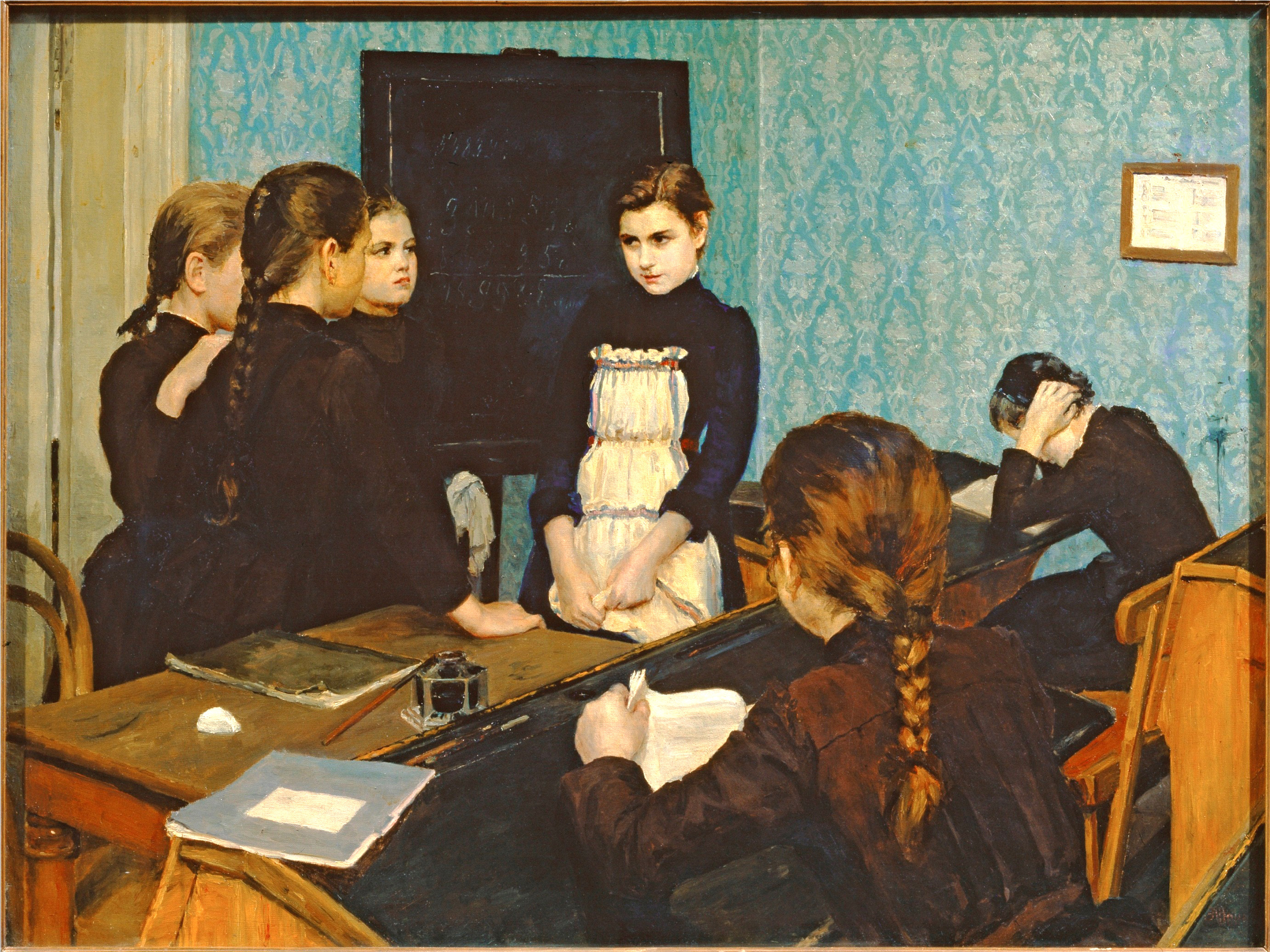
New Girl at School (1892), oil on canvas – State Tretyakov Gallery

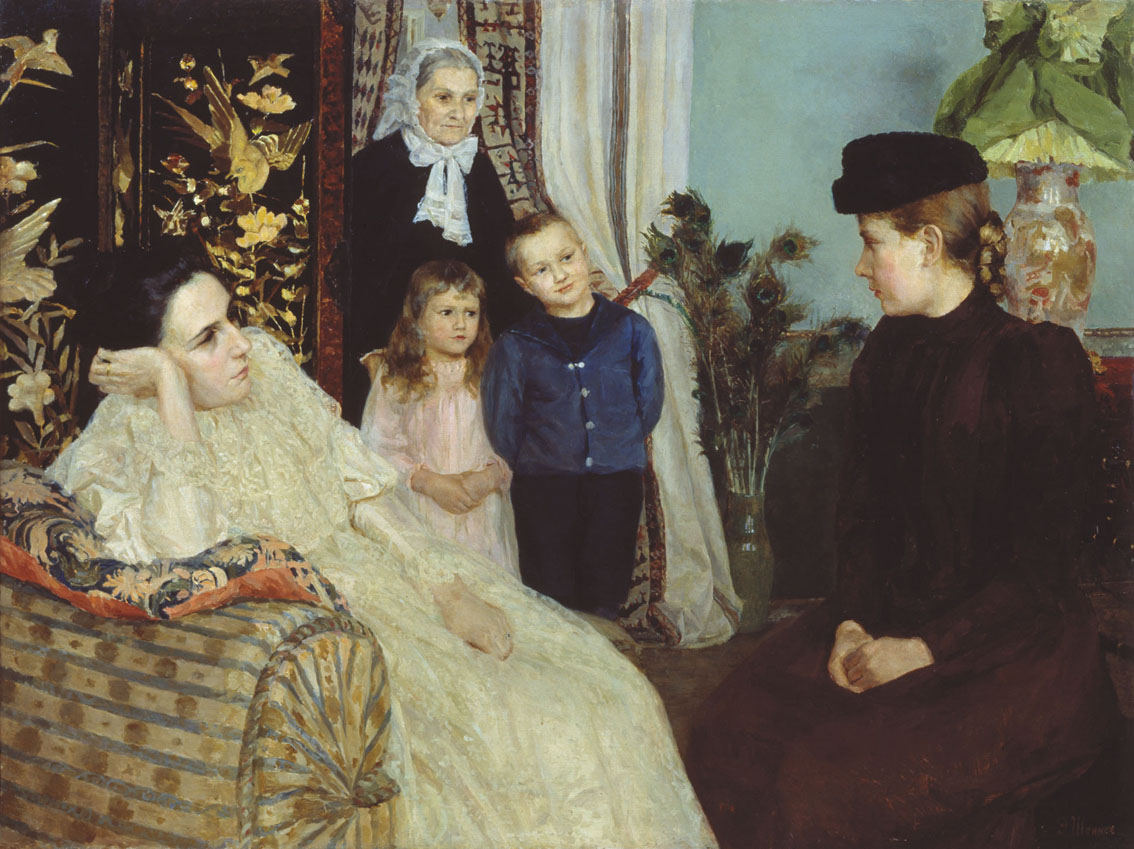
Employing a Governess, oil on canvas – Tyumen Regional Museum of Fine Arts

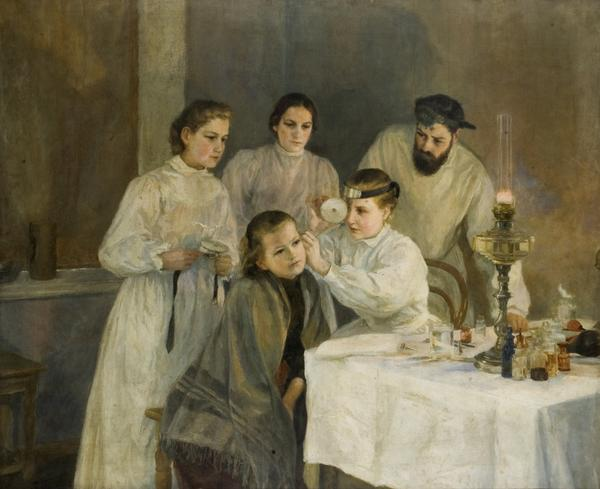
Ear Inspection, oil on canvas – Chelmsford Museum

Other paintings:

- The Lesson (1887), privately owned
- Older brother, exhibited with the Peredvizhniki in 1891, location unknown
- The Challenge, location unknown
- Inkspot, exhibited with the Peredvizhniki in 1894, location unknown
- My Favourite Doll, unknown owner and unknown date
- Work in the Syzransky Museum, Samara
- Double Portrait of Aylmer Maude and Stella Meldrum, privately owned
- A Bit of Moscow, exhibited Royal Academy 1916
- Peaceful Moscow exhibited Royal Academy 1918
- Portrait of Aylmer Maude, privately owned
- Portrait of Nial McLeland, around 1895, privately owned
- Portrait of Natalia Vasilievna Polenova (1858 – 1931), wife of Vasily Polenov, 1894, Polenovo museum
- Tsarina's Golden Chamber, depicts the eponymous Kremlin building, privately owned

== Notes ==
- Shanks' Russian name Yakovlevna or Jakovlevna is a patronymic from her father's name, James.
