= James Steuart Shanks =

British merchant (1824–1911)

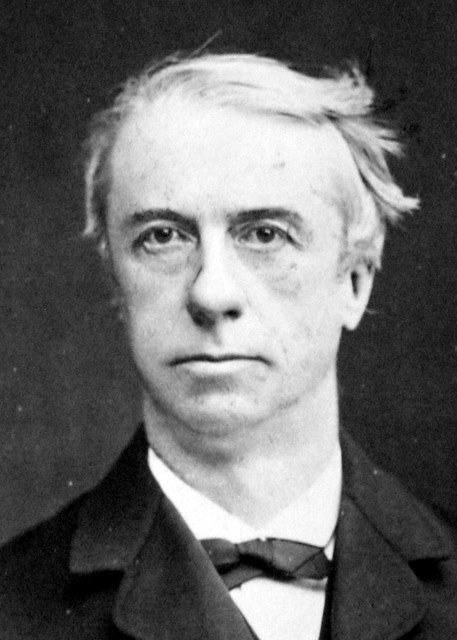
James Steuart Shanks

James Steuart Shanks, (1826–1911), second son of the coachmaker Robert Shanks was a British merchant living in Moscow. James studied at Leiden University and he came of age in 1845 at which point he inherited from his uncle Robert How. In 1852 James established the Moscow shop 'Shanks & Bolin, Magasin Anglais' with Henrik Conrad Bolin, younger brother of Carl Edvard Bolin, the St. Petersburg jeweller of House of Bolin. Two of his children, Emily Shanks and Louise Maude, made significant contributions to Russian and British art and literature.

== Family background ==
James was the second son of Robert Shanks, coachmaker of Gt. Queen Street, Lincoln's Inn Fields. Robert Shanks was born in Calcutta and apprenticed as a coachmaker with the Steuart coachbuilders where his brothers were partners. Robert moved to London to partner Robert How in the London coachmaking business and marry Ann How, Robert How's sister. James Shanks was the second son of Robert Shanks, the first son, Robert How Shanks, inherited his father's business after his father's retirement and the death of Robert How with no issue. James went to University in Leiden, and apprenticed to the cloth merchant Bradbury Greatorex & Co where he gained a knowledge of textiles. When he came of age he inherited from his uncle Robert How, James chose to make his own way in life. It is not known how he met Henrik Conrad Bolin (1818–1888), however, the Bolins are known to have had considerable success at the Great Exhibition of 1851, Shanks & Bolin was established in the following year.

== Shanks & Bolin, Magasin Anglais ==
Magasin Anglais (the English Shop) was founded in 1852 and between 1880 and 1916 was located at 3 Kuznetski Most. This building still stands and is known as the 'Tretyakov House' which is now numbered 9/10 Kuznetski Most. Magasin Anglais is often described as an outfitter, selling women's accessories such as handbags, fans, furs and gloves, fabric for clothing, carpets, silverware as well as jewellery, some made by the House of Bolin. Items of silver were commissioned from the silversmith workshops of Maria Ivanovna Linke and were sold in by silverware division of the shop. After the death of H K Bolin in 1888, the jewellery division of Shanks & Bolin was sold to Bolin, the shop was then renamed Shanks & Co, Magasin Anglais.

== Children of James Steuart Shanks ==
In 1853 James Steuart Shanks married Mary Louisa Schilling (of German-Baltic descent), they had nine children. Two of James' children made significant contributions to art and literature. Emily Shanks was the first female member of the Russian painters known as Peredvizhniki. Louise Shanks married Aylmer Maude and translated Tolstoy's novels into English, these translations are considered to be the best of their time.

Mary Shanks was a member of Tolstoy's circle and adopted the Russian child Anya Troup. James Shanks junior and Henry Shanks carried on the Magasin Anglais business after the retirement of James Steuart Shanks. The family business was lost during the revolution of 1917.

George Shanks, son of Henry Shanks, is believed to be the first to translate the fraudulent antisemitic text, The Protocols of the Elders of Zion, from Russian into English and was a founder of Radio Normandy.
