= John Schenck =

John Schenck (sometimes written Schanck) (1750–1823) was a captain in the New Jersey Militia during the American Revolutionary War.

Signatures from John's 1770 Marriage Bond

== Background ==
Schenck was born in the now-defunct Amwell Township, Hunterdon County, New Jersey on May 26, 1750, the son of Gerret Roelofse Schenck (1719–1794) and Marytje van Sicklen (1722–1778). His ancestors were early Dutch settlers of New Amsterdam who had moved into New Jersey in the 1690s. In 1770, Schenck married Aida Sutphen (1754–1818), daughter of Aert Sutphen (1718–1798) and Jannetje Van Mater (1724-aft. 1798), whose ancestors were also part of the New Amsterdam Dutch settlement.

When Schenck died on his farm in Amwell Township, he left a sizeable estate. He is buried in Pleasant Ridge Cemetery, in what is now Raritan Township, along with his wife, parents and many of his children. His marker reads "In memory of Captain John Schenck, who departed this life August 22, 1823, aged 73 years, 2 months and 27 days."

== Military service ==
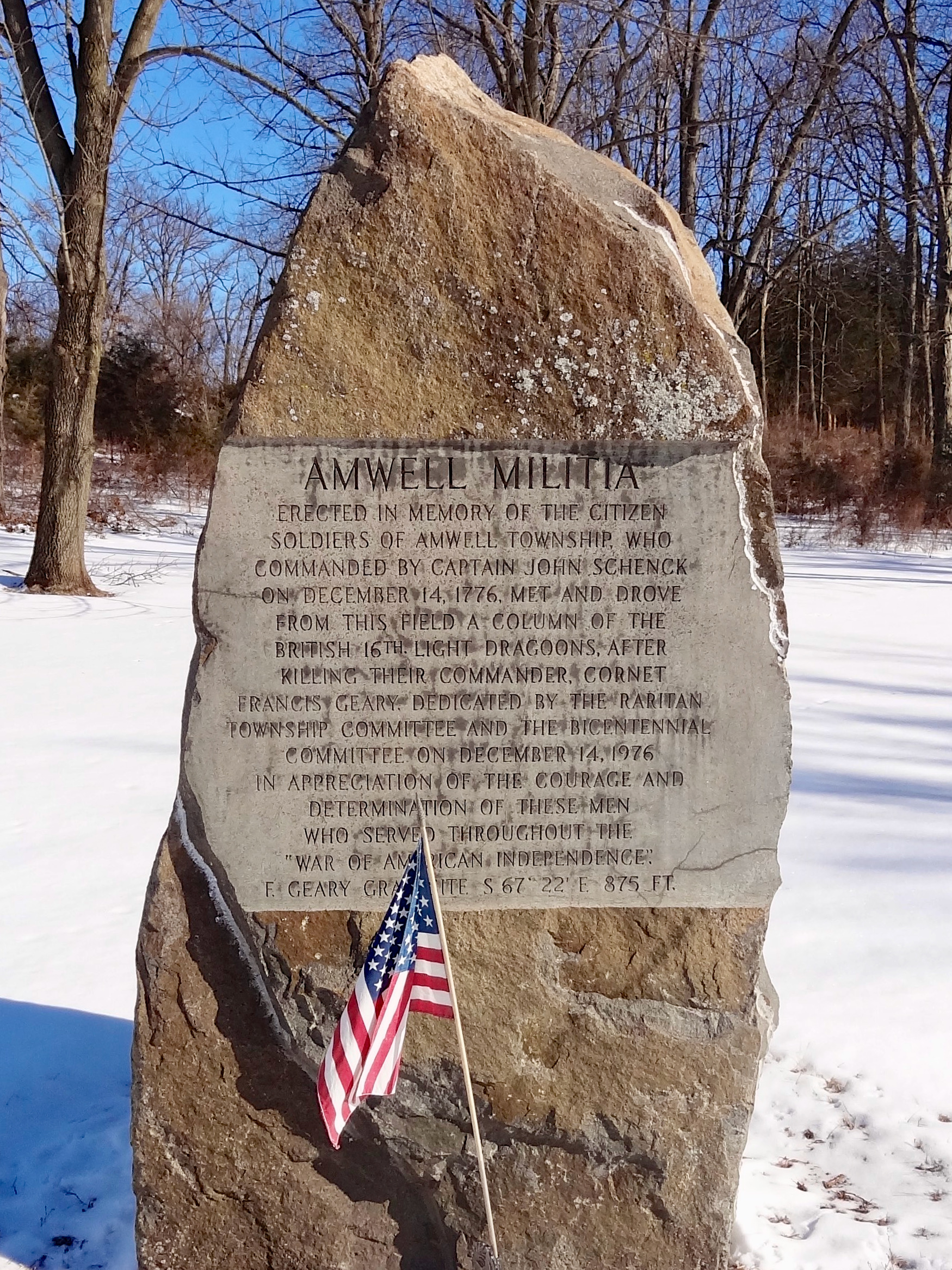
Amwell Militia monument for Captain John Schenck and the Ambush of Geary

In 1775, Schenck was one of the first residents of Hunterdon County to volunteer to serve as a Minuteman in the months following the Battles of Lexington and Concord. He first served as a lieutenant and then was elected a captain of what was to become a company of the 3rd Regiment Hunterdon Militia. In eight years of service with the Militia, Captain Schenck fought in most of the major battles of the War in New Jersey and Pennsylvania. He was at the battles of Monmouth, Trenton, the Second Battle of Trenton (where he took command of another 3rd Regiment company after its lieutenants deserted and its captain fell sick), Princeton (where a cannonball took away a tree branch he had stooped to pass under), Bound Brook and Germantown.

== Ambush of Geary ==
Captain Schenck is best remembered by the residents of Hunterdon County for a small skirmish (the Ambush of Geary, as it is called locally) that took place there on December 14, 1776. Arriving home on leave from Washington's army across the Delaware, Schenck was informed by a cousin that a scouting party of British dragoons were in the area. Schenck quickly assembled a party of irregulars from family members and neighbors and set an ambush for the British as they returned from their mission. Schenck and his party successfully took the dragoons by surprise and with their first volley killed the troop's officer, Cornet Francis Geary.
