= Shank =

Shank may refer to:

== Art and entertainment ==
- Shank (video game), an action game
- Shank (2009 film), a British drama
- Shank (2010 film), a thriller set in futuristic London
- Shank, a play by Richard Vincent
- Warlord Shank, a villain in the TV series Space Cases
- "Shank", a 1962 song by Bo Diddley from Bo Diddley's a Twister

== Objects ==
- Shank (footwear), a part of a shoe or boot
- Shank (jewelry), a hoop part of a jewelry ring
- Shank (sewing), a spacing device
- Shank (weapon), a makeshift knife or stabbing weapon
- Lead shank, a type of lead used for horses
- Tang (tools), the back portion of the blade component of a tool
- Drill bit shank, the non-cutting end of a drill bit
- Sheepshank, a knot used to shorten a rope

== People ==
- Shank (surname), includes a list of notable people with the surname

== Places ==
- Mount Schank, a dormant volcano in Australia
- Shankh Monastery, a monastery in Mongolia
- Forward Operating Base Shank, a U.S. military base in Afghanistan (named after SSG Michael A. Shank)
- Shanksville, Pennsylvania

== Other uses ==
- Another name for the lower leg in humans
- Tibia, one of the two main bones of the leg
- Shank (meat), a cut of meat (e.g., beef shank)
- Shank, a poor golf stroke
- Shanks, wading birds in the genus Tringa
- Shankh, a quantity in the Indian numbering system
- SHANK1, SHANK2, and SHANK3, types of protein

== See also ==
- Shanks (disambiguation)
- Schenck
- Schenk
- Shenk
