= Schenk =

Schenk is a German and Jewish (Ashkenazic) occupational surname derived from (aus)schenken (to pour out or serve) referring to the medieval profession of cup-bearer or wine server (later also to tavern keeper). At one time, only Jews were allowed to sell alcohol in the Russian empire, which is why Shenk (Russian) and its later surname variants are very common.

== People with the surname Schenk ==
People with this surname include:

- Adam Schenk (born 1992), American golfer
- Ard Schenk (born 1944), Dutch speed skater
- August Schenk (1815–1891), German botanist and paleobotanist
- Beatrice Schenk de Regniers (1914–2000), American children's writer and illustrator
- Bel Schenk (born 1975), Australian poet
- Bert Schenk (born 1970), German boxer
- Berthold von Schenk (1895–1974), American Lutheran pastor
- Christian Schenk (born 1965), East German decathlete
- Dieter Schenk (born 1937), German author and police officer
- Francis Joseph Schenk (1901–1969), American Catholic prelate
- Franziska Schenk (born 1974), German speed skater
- Fritz Schenk (1930–2006), German journalist
- Georg Schenk von Limpurg (1470–1522), Prince-Bishop of Bamberg
- Gretchen Knief Schenk (1901–1989), American librarian
- Hanne Schenk (born 1984), Swiss bobsledder
- Hans Schenk (athlete) (1936–2006), German javelin thrower
- Hans Schenk (economist), Dutch economist
- Heinz Schenk (1924–2014), German television moderator
- Henk Schenk (born 1945), Dutch-born American wrestler
- Isobel Schenk (1898–1980), Australian Christian missionary
- Jakab Schenk (1876–1945), Hungarian ornithologist
- Jakob Schenk (1921–1951), Swiss cyclist
- Johan Schenk (1660 – after 1712), Dutch musician and composer
- Johann Baptist Schenk (1753–1836), Austrian composer
- Josephus Schenk (born 1980), Dutch darts player
- Juliane Schenk (born 1982), German badminton player
- Juraj Schenk (born 1948), Slovak government minister
- Karl Schenk (1823–1895), Swiss pastor and politician
- Katharina Schenk (born 1988), German politician
- Leopold Schenk (1840–1902), Austrian embryologist
- Lynn Schenk (born 1945), American politician from California
- Nick Schenk (born 1965), American screenwriter
- Otto Schenk (1930–2025), Austrian actor, theater and opera director
- Otto Schenk (cyclist), German racing cyclist
- Pavel Schenk (1941–2025), Czech volleyball player
- Peter Schenk the Elder (1660–1712), German-born Dutch engraver and cartographer
- Peter Schenk the Younger (1693–1775), Dutch engraver and map publisher
- Rodolphe Samuel Schenk (1888–1969), Australian Christian missionary
- Rupert Schenk (born 2001), German bobsledder
- Xandro Schenk (born 1993), Dutch footballer

=== Other versions of Schenk ===
- Claus Schenk von Stauffenberg (1907–1944), German army officer, aristocrat and resistance member
- For his relatives, see the Stauffenberg family family

== See also ==
- Schenks, Squamish village in British Columbia
- Shank (disambiguation)
