= Hadji Murat (novella) =

1912 novella by Leo Tolstoy

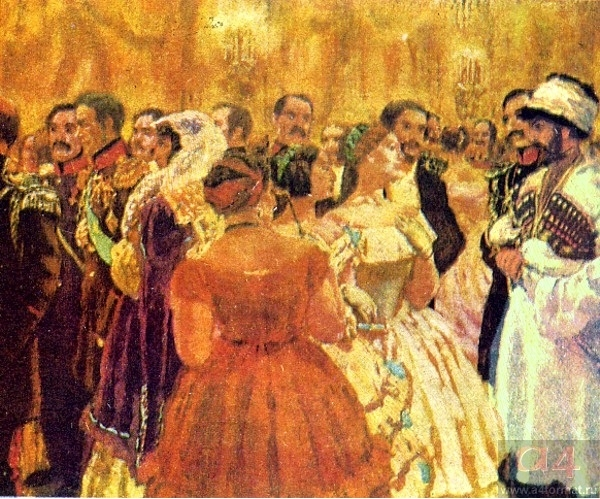
- Hadji Murat at Prince Semyon Vorontsov's house, illustration by Eugene Lanceray
- Author: Leo Tolstoy
- Original title: Хаджи-Муратъ
- Translator: Aylmer Maude (1912)
- Language: Russian
- Genre: Historical fiction, novella
- Publication date: 1912 (abridged); 1917 (unabridged) (posthumously)
- Publication place: Russia
- Media type: Print
- Pages: 192 pp (hardback)
- ISBN: 978-1-84749-179-4
- Original text: Хаджи-Муратъ at Russian Wikisource
- Translation: Hadji Murat at Wikisource

Hadji Murat, also written Hadji Murad (Russian: Хаджи-Мурат, romanized: Khadzhi-Murat), (Note: Written Хаджи-Муратъ in pre-reform Russian orthography) is a novella written by Leo Tolstoy from 1896 to 1904 and published posthumously in 1912 (though not the full text until 1917). Its titular protagonist Hadji Murat is an Avar rebel commander who, to gain revenge, forges an uneasy alliance with the Russians he has been fighting.

== Inspiration ==
The theme of struggle while remaining faithful resonated with an ailing Tolstoy as he approached death. His letters suggest that this work gave him a brief, final moment of vigor. Just as the author struggled with failing health, his meditation on a man refusing to give in to the demands of the world helped him to complete the book, although he did not intend to publish it and was only concerned with its completion. In addition to the theme of resistance, determinism is a major theme, as it is in War and Peace. Another prominent theme is the struggle between imperial Russia and the Caucasian Imamate, reflecting the broader East vs. West dichotomy frequently explored in 19th-century Russian literature.

The work recalls Alexander Pushkin's historical novel The Captain's Daughter (1836) because its realism is also based on actual people and events, though the main character in Pushkin does not meet the same end. Tolstoy used material in Russian archives, including Hadji Murad's own account of his life.

== Historical context ==
Tolstoy created this story, set in the Caucasus Mountains during the mid-nineteenth century, when Russian imperial expansion sought to subdue Chechen and Dagestani tribes. Hadji Murat is also linked with Tolstoy's own military experiences in the region. He wrote to his brother in 1851: "If you wish to show off with news… you may recount that a certain Hadji Murad [...] surrendered a few days ago to the Russian government. He was the leading dare-devil and ‘brave’ of all Chechnya, but has been led into committing a mean action."

In the book he described the Caucasian War that both he and Hadji Murad were caught up in. Although written about fifty years after the events occurred, Tolstoy highlights the contrast between the bureaucratic rigidity of the Russian imperial court and the passionate life of the mountain tribes.

== Plot summary ==
The narrator prefaces the story with the image of a crushed, but still living thistle he finds in a field (a symbol for the main character), after which he begins to tell the story of Hadji Murat, a renowned guerrilla leader who falls out with his own commander and eventually sides with the Russians, hoping to save his family, who are captives of Imam Shamil, the Avar leader who abducted his mother, two wives, and five children. He also wants to avenge the deaths of other family members. The story opens with Murat and two of his followers fleeing Shamil, the commander of the Caucasian warriors fighting the Russians. They find refuge at the house of Sado, a loyal supporter of Murat. Villagers learn of his presence, and Murat escapes before they can do him harm.

His lieutenant succeeds in making contact with the Russians, who promise to meet Murat. He eventually arrives at the fortress of Vozdvizhenskaya to join the Russian forces, hoping to draw their support to overthrow Shamil and save his family. Before his arrival, a small skirmish occurs with some Chechen and Dagestani mountaineers outside the fortress, and Petrukha Avdeyev, a young Russian soldier, dies in a military hospital from gunshot wounds. Tolstoy makes a chapter-length aside about Petrukha: childless, he volunteered as a conscript in place of his brother, who had a family of his own. Petrukha's father regrets this because he was a dutiful worker compared to his lazy brother.

While at Vozdvizhenskaya, Murat befriends Prince Semyon Vorontsov, the Viceroy's son, his wife Maria and his son, and wins over the goodwill of the soldiers stationed there. They are at once in awe of his physique and reputation, and enjoy his company, finding him honest and upright. The Vorontsovs give him a present of a watch which fascinates him. On the fifth day of Murat's stay, the governor-general's adjutant, Mikhail Loris-Melikov, arrives with orders to write down Murat's story, and the reader learns some of his history: he was born in the village of Tselmes and early on became close to the local khans because his mother was the royal family's wet nurse. When he was fifteen some followers of Muridism came into his village, calling for a holy war (ghazavat) against Russia. Murat declines at first, but after a learned man is sent to explain how it will be run, he tentatively agrees. However, in their first confrontation, Shamil—then a lieutenant for the Muslims hostile to the Russians—embarrasses Murat when he goes to speak with the leader Hamzat. Hamzat eventually launches an attack on the capital of Khunzakh and kills the pro-Russian khans, taking control of this part of Dagestan. The slaughter of the khans throws Hadji and his brother against Hamzat, and they eventually succeed in killing him. Unfortunately, Murat's brother is killed as well and Shamil replaces Hamzat as leader. He calls on Murat to join his struggle, but Murat refuses because the blood of his brother and the khans is on Shamil.

Once Murat has joined the Russians, who are aware of his position and bargaining strength, they find him a useful tool for getting to Shamil. However, Vorontsov's plans are complicated by the War Minister, Chernyshov, a rival prince who is jealous of him, and Murat has to remain in the fortress because the Tsar is told he might be a spy. The story includes a satirical depiction of Tsar Nicholas I of Russia, portraying him as vain, autocratic, and bitter, and detailing his contempt for women, his brother-in-law Frederick William IV of Prussia, and Russian students.

The Tsar orders an attack on the mountaineers and Murat remains in the fortress. Meanwhile, Murat's mother, wife and eldest son Yusuf, whom Shamil holds captive, are moved to a more defensible location. Realizing his position (neither trusted by the Russians to lead an army against Shamil, nor able to return to Shamil because he will be killed), Hadji Murat decides to flee the fortress to gather men to save his family.

At this point the narrative jumps forward to the arrival of a group of soldiers at the fortress bearing Murat's severed head. Maria Dimitriyevna—the companion of one of the officers and a friend of Murat—comments on the cruelty of men during times of war, calling them 'butchers'. The soldiers then tell the story of Murat's death. He had escaped the fortress and shaken off his Russian escort with the help of his five lieutenants. After they escape they come upon a marsh that they are unable to cross, and hide amongst some bushes until the morning. An old man gives away their position, and Karganov, the commander of the fortress, the soldiers, and some Cossacks surround the area. Hadji Murat and his men dig in and begin to fire upon the troops, dying valiantly. Hadji himself charges into fire after his men are killed, despite being wounded and plugging up his fatal wounds with cloth. As he fires his last bullet his life flashes before him; he gets up for one final struggle and falls dead. The Russian soldiers fall upon and decapitate him. The nightingales, which stopped singing during the battle, begin again, and the narrator ends by recalling the thistle once more.

== Character list ==
- Hadji Murad

Hadji feels strongly conflicted about joining the Russians, ordinarily his enemies, against Caucasian tribesmen to defeat Shamil, who captured his mother, wives, and children. He is an Avar Caucasian warrior who was formerly a Russian-appointed governor of Avaria and currently Shamil's chief representative there. Hadji limps because he was wounded while escaping from Akhmet Khan, a rival leader. Hadji's personality varies depending on circumstances: at times he is intimidating; at other times, he is very kind.

- Shamil

Shamil, dynamic and charismatic, is the leader of the Caucasian resistance to the Russian invasion. He holds Hadji Murad’s family and loved ones captive so he can draw Hadji to a place where he can kill him.

- Prince Mikhail Semyonovich Vorontsov

This prince is a Russian commander. His wealth and connections make him a powerful leader to follow. He is the only Russian commander to whom Hadji Murat will submit and listen. Vorontsov does not give Hadji everything that he wants, such as trading prisoners for his family. However, Vorontsov does let Hadji move freely to search for his family.

- Petrukha Avdeyev

Avdeyev is a young Russian soldier who bleeds to death in a military hospital after being shot in a skirmish outside the fortress. An entire chapter is dedicated to explaining his life. He has no children, and he volunteered as a conscript in place of his brother, who had a family of his own.

- Nicholas I

The authoritarian and bitter Tsar of Russia. He is egotistical and treats women and those who are close to him poorly. This includes Frederick William IV of Prussia and Russian students.

- Maria Dimitriyevna

She befriends Murat and feels shocked by the cruelty of men at war when she sees his severed head.

== Themes ==
Hadji Murat is very different from the other works Tolstoy produced around the same time. In The Devil (1889), The Kreutzer Sonata (1890), "Father Sergius" (1898), Resurrection (1899), "Master and Man" (1895), and The Forged Coupon (1905), the emphasis is primarily on moral duty and spiritual purification. Literary scholar Edmund Heier notes that Hadji Murat is unique among Tolstoy's late fiction because its protagonist does not undergo moral transformation or embrace an ethical ideal, presenting an unsparing depiction of human violence and institutional cruelty. Rebecca Ruth Gould has described Hadji Murat, along with Tolstoy's other writings on the Caucasus, as "ethnographic footnotes informing the reader about the history, languages, and customs of Russia’s enemies."

== Symbolism ==
The narrator encounters two thistles at the beginning of the story. The first thistle is crimson colored and very prickly, so he has to go around to avoid it. He desperately wants it for his bouquet, but, while he is trying to uproot it, he accidentally destroys its beauty. Shortly afterward, he finds the second thistle, which has been run over and stands half-broken, though it still looks resilient. After the events unfold, Hadji Murat becomes the thistle that grew on Russian soil but is ignored or destroyed. Tolstoy also uses the sound of nightingales trilling that breaks the eerie silence after Hadji Murad's violent death to symbolise the ongoing life in nature, despite man's murderous act.

== Reception ==
American literary critic Harold Bloom said of Hadji Murat: "[it is] my personal touchstone for the sublime of prose fiction, to me the best story in the world."

The novella was included in the 2013 list of 100 books for schoolchildren recommended by the Russian Ministry of Education and Science.

== Editions and translations ==
Over 250 editions of Hadji Murat have been published since 1912. Translations into English include those by Kyril Zinovieff and Jenny Hughes (2015) for Alma Publications, Pevear and Volokhonsky's 2009 translation, David McDuff (2006), and Paul Foote (1977) now in Penguin Classics, plus the commonly reprinted 1912 version by Aylmer Maude. This has been available since 2003 with an introduction by Azar Nafisi. The Pevear and Volokhonsky edition was chosen by Boyd Tonkin as his selection for the BBC Radio 4 show A Good Read on Friday 4 December 2020.

Several editions combine Hadji Murat with the early Tolstoy novel The Cossacks and sometimes also with the 1852–1853 story "The Raid", all set in the Caucasus during the period of Russia's consolidation of power in the 19th century.

== Adaptation ==
A Malaysian stageplay adaptation directed by A. Wahab Hamzah and Aris Othman based on a script by Anwar Ridhwan, a co-translator of the Malaysian edition, was performed at the Tun Syed Nasir Hall in the Dewan Bahasa dan Pustaka complex in Kuala Lumpur starting 26 June 2024. The first performance was attended by Prime Minister Anwar Ibrahim.

== See also ==
- Leo Tolstoy bibliography
