= The Snowstorm =

- Short story by Leo Tolstoy
- Original title: Метель (Metel)
- Country: Russian Empire
- Language: Russian
- Genre(s): Realism

Publication
- Published in: Sovremennik
- Publication type: Periodical
- Publication date: March 1856
- Published in English: 1903

"The Snowstorm" (also translated as "The Snow Storm") (Russian: Метель, romanized: Metel) is a short story by the Russian author Leo Tolstoy. It was first published in 1856, in the literary and political magazine Sovremennik.

== Background ==
The idea for "The Snowstorm" dates back to January, 1854, when Tolstoy was lost all night in a snowstorm about 100 versts (~107 km or 66 miles) from Cherkassk and thought to write a story about the event. It was two years later before he carried out his plan and wrote the story.

== Plot ==
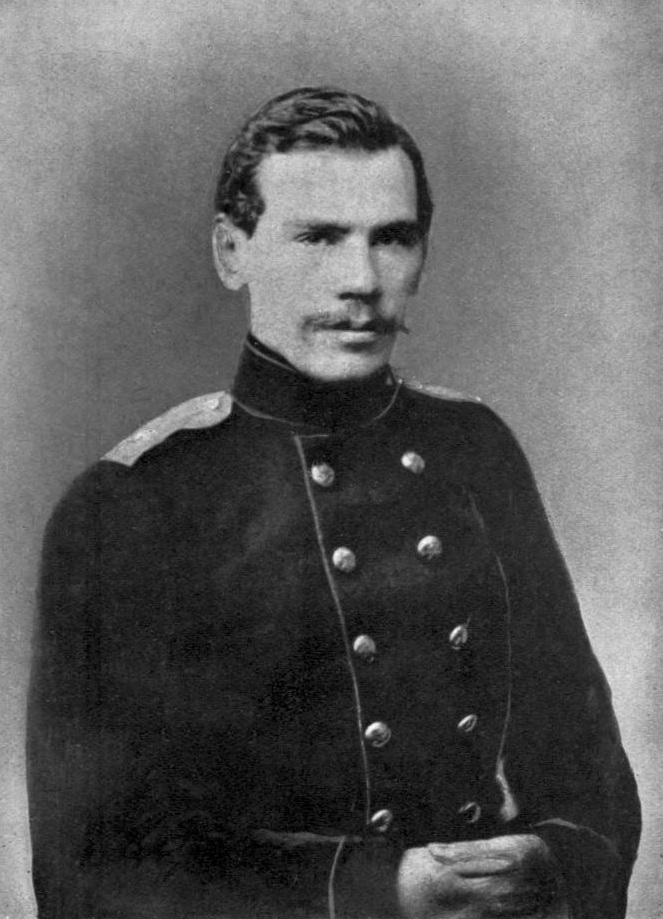
Photo of Tolstoy, by Sergei Lvovich Levitsky, 1856

The unnamed narrator of the story and his manservant Alyeshka start on an evening trip by sledge from Novocherkassk in the Caucasus to a destination in central Russia. As they ride, a winter storm begins, and soon the road becomes covered with heavy, thick snow. The narrator becomes concerned about getting lost and queries his driver about their chances of making it safely to the next post station. The driver is somewhat vague and fatalistic concerning the rest of the journey, suggesting that they may or may not get through. The narrator has little confidence in the driver, who seems inexperienced and sullen.

A few minutes later, the driver stops the sledge, gets down, and starts searching for the road that they have lost. Disturbed by this situation, the narrator orders the phlegmatic driver to turn back, giving the horses their head to seek out the post station from which they started out. To add to the anxiety, the driver tells a story of some recent travelers who got lost and froze to death in a similar storm.

Soon they hear the bells of three men sledges coming toward them and going in the opposite direction. The narrator orders his driver to turn around and follow the fresh tracks of the courier sledges. The tracks and road markers quickly disappear in the drifting snow. The narrator himself now gets out of the sledge to look for the road, but soon loses sight of even the sledge. After finding his driver and sledge, a decision is again made to turn back and return to the station from which they started out.

Again they hear the bells of the courier troika, which is now returning to their original starting point, having delivered the mail and changed horses. The narrator's driver suggests that they follow them back. As the narrator's driver tries to turn around, his shafts hit the horses tied to the back of the third mail troika, making them break their straps, bolt, and run. The post driver goes off in search of the runaway horses while the narrator follows the first two sledges at full gallop. In better spirits now that he has somebody to follow, the narrator's driver converses with his passenger affably, telling about his life and family circumstances.

Soon they run across a caravan of wagons, led by a mare without help from the driver, who is sleeping. They almost lose sight of the courier sledges, and the driver wants to turn around again, but they go on.

The old driver who went to get the runaway horses returns with all three and loses little time in reprimanding the narrator's driver, whose inexperience created the problem in the first place.

The narrator begins to daydream, losing himself in the monotonous and desolate snowstorm and musing lyrically about the snow and wind: “Memories and fancies followed one another with increased rapidity in my imagination.” The narrator conjures up stream-of-consciousness images of his youth: the old family butler on their baronial estate, summers in the country, fishing, languid July afternoons, and finally a peasant drowning in their pond and nobody being able to help.

The narrator's driver announces that his horses are too tired to go on, and he proposes that the narrator and his servant go with the post sledges. The baggage is transferred, and the narrator is glad to get into the warm, snug sledge. Inside, two old men are telling stories to pass the time. They give very short, blunt answers to the narrator's suggestion that they all might freeze to death if the horses give out: “To be sure, we may.” After driving a while longer, the men in the sledge begin arguing about whether what they see on the horizon is an encampment. The narrator becomes sleepy and thinks that he is freezing to death. He has hallucinations about what it must be like to freeze to death, dozing and waking alternately.

The narrator wakes in the morning to find that the snow has stopped and he has arrived at a post station. He treats all the men to a glass of vodka and, having received fresh horses, continues on the next leg of his journey.

== Reception ==
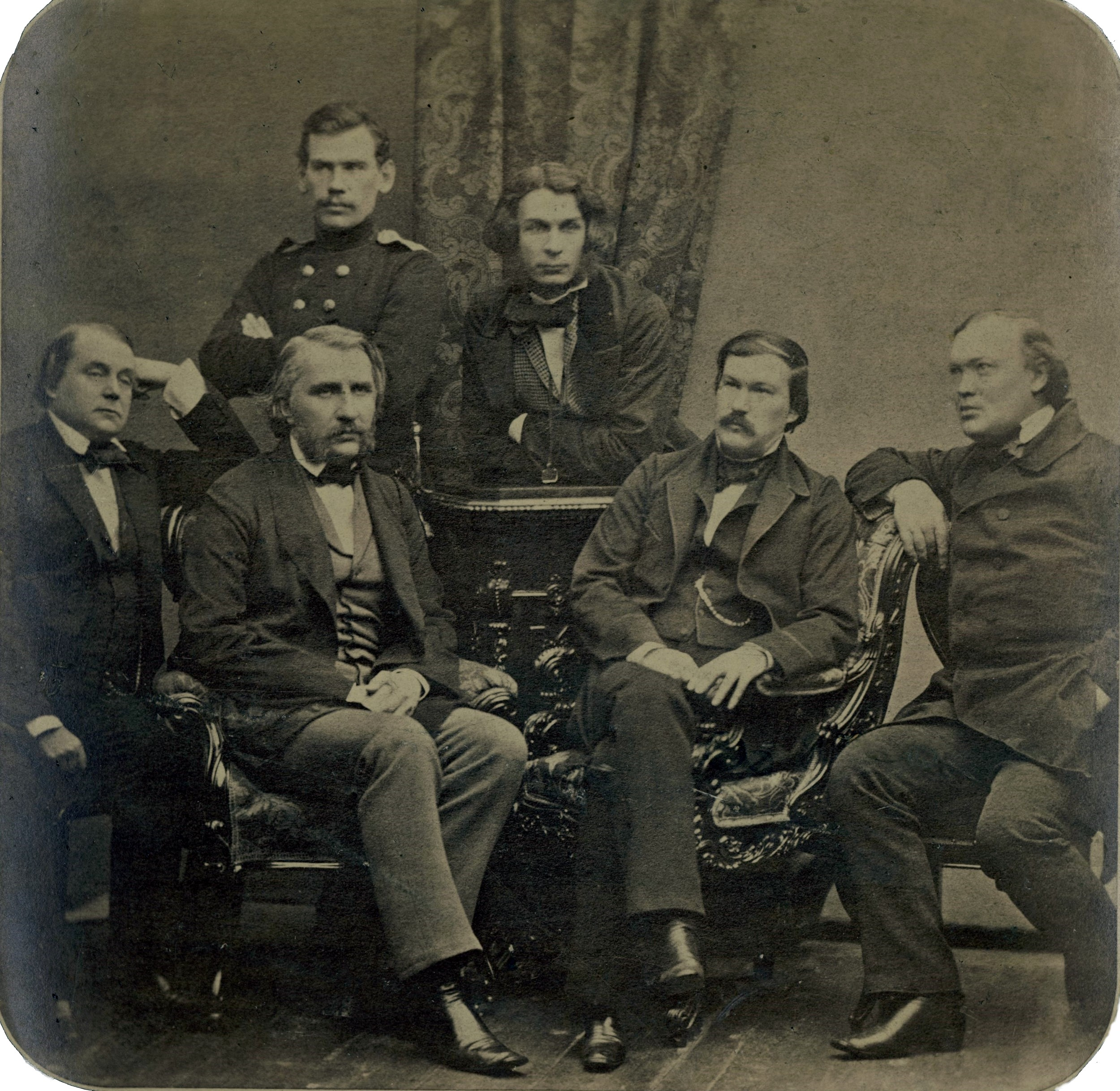
Contributors to Sovremennik in 1856 (left to right): Ivan Goncharov, Ivan Turgenev, Leo Tolstoy, Dmitri Grigorovich, Alexander Druzhinin and Alexander Ostrovsky.

Unlike other text that Tolstoy published at this time (Two Hussars and A Landowner's Morning), reception of "The Snowstorm" among the literati of contemporary Russia, was generally favorable.

"The Snow Storm" still benefited from his high reputation and was seen by its early reviewers less as prose as such, more as poetry in prose in its tonalities and even in its structure; Turgenev was as usual carried away, and Sergey Aksakov agreed, finding the description of the blizzard the most realistic he had ever read. Herzen thought it marvellous and Alexander Druzhinin wrote in the Biblioteka dlya chteniya that there had been nothing quite like it since the days of Pushkin and Gogol.

In Modern Language Studies 1987, Sydney Schultze writes:

This slender story serves as the vehicle for a beautiful description of a snowstorm surrounding an even more vivid description of a blistering day in July. But there appears to be no point to the story, no message of the sort one expects from Tolstoj even in his early works.

Early commentators like Druzinin praised Tolstoj's descriptive powers in "The Snowstorm", but did not have much to say about other aspects of the story. Later critics have also paid little attention to "The Snowstorm" beyond a complimentary reference to the description of the storm. Typical is Ernest J. Simmons, who in his biography of Tolstoy says, "There is no plot; the theme is the storm ... The effectively repeated motifs of the snow and wind amount almost to the incremental repetition of a folk ballad." Ejxenbaum finds "The Snowstorm" notable for its plot arrangement, the weaving together of reality and dreams, rather than its fabula (story line).

== Publication history ==
=== Translations ===
- "Lost on the Steppe; or, The Snowstorm". The Invaders and Other Stories. trans. Haskell Dole, Nathan. New York: Thomas Y. Crowell & Co. 1887.
- "The Snowstorm". More Tales from Tolstoi. trans. Bain, R. Nisbet. New York: Bretano. 1903.
- "The Snow-Storm". The Complete Works of Count Tolstóy. Vol. III. trans. Wiener, Leo. Boston: Dane Estes & Company. 1904.

== See also ==
- Leo Tolstoy bibliography

== Bibliography ==
- Sydney Schultze (1987). "Meaning in 'The Snowstorm'". Modern Language Studies. 17 (1): 67–74. JSTOR 3194753.
- A. V. Knowles (July 1977). "Tolstoy's Literary Reputation before War and Peace". The Modern Language Review. 72 (3). Modern Humanities Research Association: 627–639. JSTOR 3725403.
- Allen Thorndike Rice, ed. (December 1887). "Tolstoi's Short Stories". North American Review. 145 (373): 696–698.
