= The Death of Ivan Ilyich =

1886 novella by Leo Tolstoy

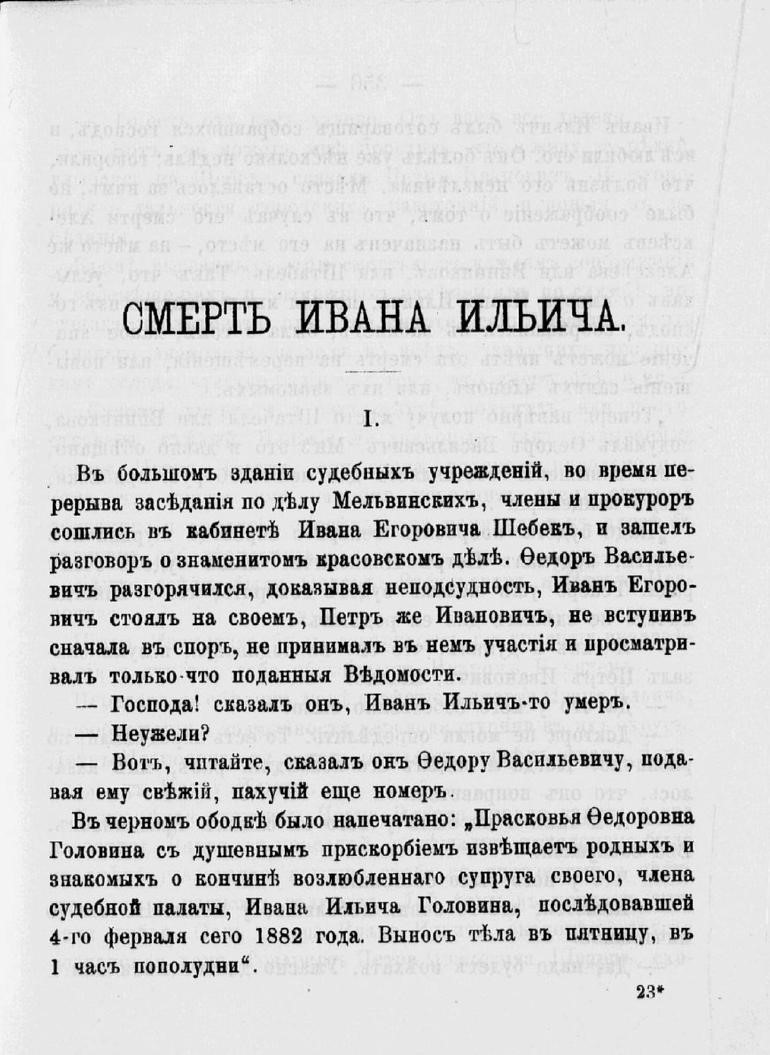
- First Russian edition
- Author: Leo Tolstoy
- Original title: Смерть Ивана Ильича
- Translator: Aylmer and Louise Maude; Constance Garnett; Rosemary Edmonds; Richard Pevear and Larissa Volokhonsky; Kirsten Lodge
- Language: Russian
- Genre: Philosophical fiction
- Publication date: 1886
- Publication place: Russia
- English publication date: 1902
- Dewey Decimal: 891.733
- LC Class: PG3366.S6
- Original text: Смерть Ивана Ильича at Russian Wikisource
- Translation: The Death of Ivan Ilyich at Wikisource

The Death of Ivan Ilyich (also Romanized Ilich, Ilych, Ilyitch; Russian: Смерть Ивана Ильича, romanized: Smert' Ivána Ilyichá), first published in 1886, is a novella by Leo Tolstoy, considered one of the masterpieces of his late fiction, written shortly after his religious conversion of the late 1870s.

Considered to be one of the finest examples of a novella, The Death of Ivan Ilyich tells the story of a high-court judge in 19th-century Russia and his sufferings and death from a terminal illness.

== Plot ==
=== Characters ===
- Ivan Ilyich Golovin (Ilyich is a patronymic, while his surname is Golovin) is a highly respected official in the Court of Appeals, described by Tolstoy as "neither as cold and formal as his elder brother nor as wild as the younger, but was a happy mean between them—an intelligent, polished, lively, and agreeable man." As the narrative unfolds, he grows increasingly introspective and emotionally vulnerable while reflecting on the cause of his painful illness and approaching death.
- Praskovya Fyodorovna Golovina is Ivan's wife. She is portrayed as self-absorbed and only intermittently concerned with her husband's suffering when it begins to disrupt her own life.
- Gerasim is the Golovins' young butler. During Ivan's illness, he becomes his most devoted caregiver and the main source of comfort in the household.
- Pyotr Ivanovich is Ivan's longtime friend and colleague. He studied law with Ivan and is among the first to sense the seriousness of Ivan's decline.
- Vasia is Ivan's younger son.
- Lisa is Ivan's daughter.
- Petrishchev is Lisa's betrothed.

=== Plot summary ===
Ivan Ilyich lives a carefree life that is "most simple and most ordinary and therefore most terrible." Like everyone he knows, he spends his life climbing the social ladder. Enduring marriage to a woman he often finds too demanding, he works his way up to be a magistrate, thanks to the influence he has over a friend who has just been promoted, focusing more on his work as his family life becomes less tolerable.

While hanging curtains for his new home one day, he falls awkwardly and hurts his side. Though he does not think much of it at first, he begins to suffer from a pain in his side. As his discomfort grows, his behavior toward his family becomes more irritable. His wife finally insists that he visit a physician. The physician cannot pinpoint the source of his malady, but soon it becomes clear that his condition is terminal (although the physician never gives a definitive diagnosis). Confronted by his terminal condition, Ivan attempts every remedy he can to cure it until the pain grows so intense that he is forced to cease working and spend his days in bed. Here, he is brought face to face with his mortality and realizes that, although he knows of it, he does not truly grasp it.

During the long and painful process of dying, Ivan dwells on the idea that he does not deserve his suffering because he has lived rightly. If he had not lived a good life, there could be a reason for his pain; but he has, so pain and death must be arbitrary and senseless. As he begins to hate his family for avoiding the subject of his death, for pretending he is only sick and not dying, he finds his only comfort in his peasant boy servant, Gerasim, the only person in Ivan's life who is blunt regarding his death, and also the only one who, apart from his own son, shows compassion for him. Ivan begins to question whether he has, in fact, lived a good life.

In the final days of his life, Ivan makes a clear split between an artificial life, such as his own, which masks the true meaning of life and makes one fear death, and an authentic life, such as Gerasim's. Authentic life is marked by compassion and sympathy, artificial life by self-interest. Then "some force" strikes Ivan in the chest and side, and he is brought into the presence of a bright light. His hand falls onto his son's head, and Ivan pities his son. He no longer hates his daughter or wife, but rather feels pity for them and hopes his death will release them. In so doing, his terror of death leaves him, and, Tolstoy suggests, death itself disappears.

== Interpretation ==
In 1984, philosopher Merold Westphal said that the story depicts "death as an enemy which:

1. leads us to deceive ourselves,
2. robs us of the meaning of life, and
3. puts us in solitary confinement."

In 1997, psychologist Mark Freeman wrote:

Tolstoy's book is about many things: the tyranny of bourgeois niceties, the terrible weak spots of the human heart, the primacy and elision of death. But more than anything, I would offer, it is about the consequences of living without meaning, that is, without a true and abiding connection to one's life

Indeed, the mundane portrayal of Ivan's life coupled with the dramatization of his long and grueling battle with death seems to directly reflect Tolstoy's theories about moral living, which he largely derived during his sabbatical from personal and professional duties in 1877. In his lectures on Russian literature, Russian-born novelist and critic Vladimir Nabokov argues that, for Tolstoy, a sinful life such as Ivan's is moral death. Therefore, death, the return of the soul to God, is, for Tolstoy, moral life. To quote Nabokov: "The Tolstoyan formula is: Ivan lived a bad life and since the bad life is nothing but the death of the soul, then Ivan lived a living death; and since beyond death is God's living light, then Ivan died into a new life—Life with a capital L."

Tolstoy struggled greatly with self-doubt and spiritual reflection, especially as he grew close to his own death in 1910. In his book Confession, which was published in 1882, Tolstoy writes:

No matter how often I may be told, "You cannot understand the meaning of life so do not think about it, but live," I can no longer do it: I have already done it too long. I cannot now help seeing day and night going round and bringing me to death. That is all I see, for that alone is true. All else is false.

This epiphany caused significant spiritual upheaval in Tolstoy's life, prompting him to question the Russian Orthodox Church, sexuality, education, serfdom, etc. The literature Tolstoy composed during this period is some of his most controversial and philosophical, including The Death of Ivan Ilyich and short stories such as The Kreutzer Sonata and The Devil. From a biographical standpoint, therefore, it is possible to interpret The Death of Ivan Ilyich as a manifestation of Tolstoy's embroilment with death and the meaning of his own life during his final years. In other words, by dramatizing a particular sort of lifestyle and its unbearable decline, Tolstoy imparts his philosophy that success as it is judged by society, such as Ivan Ilyich's, comes at a great moral cost, and if one decides to pay this cost, life becomes hollow, insincere, and worse than death.

Martin Heidegger's magnum opus Being and Time (1927) refers to the novella as an illustration of Being toward death.

== English translations ==
- Aylmer and Louise Maude
- Constance Garnett (1902)
- Rosemary Edmonds (1960)
- Lynn Solotaroff (1981)
- Anthony Briggs (2006)
- Ian Dreiblatt (2008)
- Richard Pevear and Larissa Volokhonsky (2009)
- Peter Carson (2013)
- Nicolas Pasternak Slater (2015)
- Kirsten Lodge (2016)

== Adaptations ==
Film

- Ikiru (1952) directed by Akira Kurosawa
- A Simple Death (1985) directed by Alexander Kaidanovsky
- Ivans Xtc (2000) directed by Bernard Rose
- The Last Step (2005) directed by Ali Mosaffa
- Living (2022) directed by Oliver Hermanus
- The Death of Ivan Ilyich (2024) directed by David Seymour

Opera

- Death of Ivan Ilych (2021): A full-length chamber opera in one act, composed by John Young with libretto by Alan Olejniczak. A co-partnership premiere with Opera Orlando and Thompson Street Opera Company.

== See also ==
- Leo Tolstoy bibliography
- Five stages of grief
