= A Letter to the Liberals =

1896 open letter by Leo Tolstoy

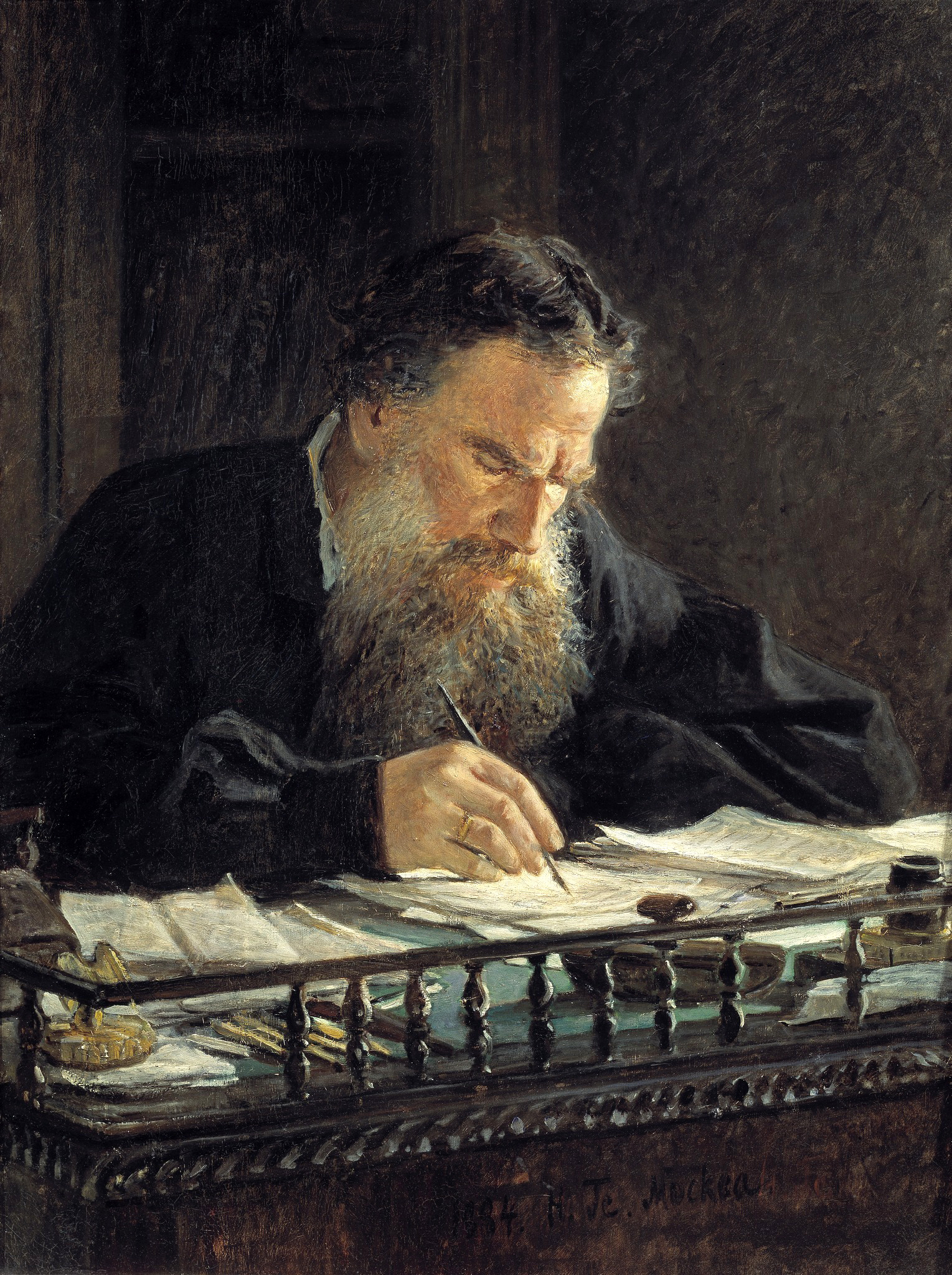
Painting of Tolstoy writing.

"A Letter to the Liberals" (AKA: "A Letter to Russian Liberals") is an 1896 open letter by Leo Tolstoy denouncing not just Liberals, but all political factions that strive to exert political power over the masses. It is directed to Alexandra Kalmykov (1849–1926), a pedagogue who supported the aristocracy. The closing of a national literacy committee was the inspiration that brought Tolstoy to write it and it was written in an atmosphere where the Nihilist movement and the anti-aristocratic agitation was in full swing.

== Content ==
The tone of the text is explicitly anarchist, to take one line from it: "A Government, therefore, and especially a Government entrusted with military power, is the most dangerous organization possible." Famous Tolstoy-translator Aylmer Maude didn't comment on the tone, but did mention that it was the most important work of Tolstoy in 1896 and clearly expresses his "non-political attitude." Other academics have emphasized the themes of Christian Anarchism appearing in the text, flowing from Tolstoy's "concept of non-resistance to evil." The Positivist Review in 1905 wrote that "neither the Terrorist policy of the revolutionary schools, nor the policy of the Liberals in endeavoring, without violence, to conquer constitutional rights bit by bit, was of any value in combating the Government."

== Influence ==
In 1908, Vladimir Molotshnikov was arrested in Novgorod by the Okhrana for smuggling copies of Tolstoy into the country, and among the works found, besides copies of "Thou Shalt Not Kill" and "Bethink Yourselves!", were "Six [copies] of the pamphlet, entitled 'A Letter to the Liberals.'"

It was influential on Gandhi, who recommended reading it in a letter to Henri Polak in 1919. Gandhi later republished parts of it in Young India on the 10th of November, 1920. Much of his life Gandhi spent redistributing the works of Tolstoy, including this text, even though it was illegal in India.

Academic and essayist Milivoy Stoyan Stanoyevich reviewed the letter in 1916, saying that this shows that Tolstoy believed that Liberalism is a "phantasmagoria" that solves "neither educational nor labor problems."

== Publication ==
The Tolstoyan Vladimir Chertkov republished it in his bulletin, Svobodnoe Slovo, in 1898.

It was translated by Leo Wiener in 1904 and Aylmer Maude in the same year.

== See also ==
- Bibliography of Leo Tolstoy
