= The Young Tsar =

Short story by Leo Tolstoy

"The Young Tsar" ("Нечаянно") is a short story by Leo Tolstoy written in 1894. According to Tolstoy's diary, he recalled having titled it "The Dream of a Young Tsar". The introduction that prefaces the story is by Aylmer Maude.

== Publication ==
According to the journalist Leo Pasvolsky, it was written shortly after the accession to the throne of Nicholas II, and though Tolstoy hoped it would be able to be printed, the censors prohibited it. When a collection of posthumous works of Tolstoy were being prepared after the writer's death, Nicholas II was asked again if it could be published, and he again refused. The work would only be published long after Tolstoy's death. Unlike many of Tolstoy's other works, this means that it wasn't until the 1910s when Russian literary critics could examine this work. Fortunately, it was available as early as 1907 in English-language countries where Tsarist censorship was powerless.

It was translated in 1912 by Leo Weiner. In 1913, it was republished by Edith Smith Davis in a Temperance movement paper. It is included in a 2009 collection by Bottletree Books called Leo Tolstoy's 20 Greatest Short Stories Annotated.

== See also ==
- Bibliography of Leo Tolstoy
