= The Big Oven =

The Big Oven is an 1899 Russian short story attributed to Leo Tolstoy about a man (in other tellings of the tale, a couple) whose house has a malfunctioning oven. Thinking his neighbour to be jealous of his large house, the character ignores out of hand his neighbour's suggestion to have the oven repaired. But even taking into account the ensuing Russian winter, he finds that the oven requires a disproportionately large amount of firewood to maintain a livable minimum temperature in the house...and ends up having to tear down his fences, outbuildings, and outer rooms for fuel to keep the oven going, until eventually he is left with nothing but the oven itself and has to go away and live with strangers.

The story is a hypothetical fable decrying the folly of stubbornness and ignorance.

Danny Kaye recorded a dramatic reading of The Big Oven for Little Golden Records in the early 1960s, based on a translation by Nathan Haskell Dole. This recording has been used in English as a second language education.
