= The Port (short story) =

Short story by Leo Tolstoy

"The Port" is a short story by Guy de Maupassant written in 1889 and translated by Leo Tolstoy into Russian in 1891 as Françoise: A Story After Maupassant ("Франсуаза"). Other works by Maupaussant translated by Tolstoy include Too Dear!, which is often included in the popular collection of Tolstoy's work Twenty Three Tales.

According to Daniel Rancour-Laferriere, a scholar at New York University Press, it is a story about man who is talking to a prostitute whom he realizes is his sister. In 1894, about three years after translated this piece, Tolstoy commented that Maupassant was a powerful but immoral genius. Tolstoy is not known much for his translations, but according to the editors at Slavic Review, this was a period in Russian literary history where Russian masters translated foreign works into native Russian. Of course, Tolstoy's translation added some variations, particularly on the part of the character Duclos and how he interacted with the sailors.

Aylmer Maude, the famous translator of Tolstoy's works, disagrees with modern scholars about the original title by Guy de Maupassant, suggesting the original title was actually Notre Dame de Vents ("Our Lady of the Winds").

== See also ==
- Bibliography of Leo Tolstoy
