= Recollections of a Billiard-marker =

Short story by Leo Tolstoy

"Recollections of a Billiard-marker" ("Записки маркера" ["Zapiski markera"], sometimes translated as "A Billiard-Marker's Notes") is a short story by Leo Tolstoy written and published in 1855, early in Tolstoy's career. It was translated to English by Nathan Haskell Dole. George Herbert Perris described the work as containing "scenic and incidental realism."

The story was included in the 1958 Tolstoy's Tales of Courage and Conflict.

== See also ==
- Bibliography of Leo Tolstoy
