= The Bear Hunt =

Short story by Leo Tolstoy

"The Bear Hunt" (Russian: Охота пуще неволи) is a short story by Leo Tolstoy written in 1872. It was translated as Desire Stronger than Necessity in 1888 by Nathan Haskell Dole.

== Composition ==
The text is commonly republished with the popular collection Twenty-Three Tales, and it comes with this note:

"The adventure here narrated is one that happened to Tolstoy himself in [December] 1858. More than twenty years later he gave up hunting, on humanitarian grounds."

The timing of Tolstoy's renunciation of hunting also coincided with his advocacy of Vegetarianism, Pacifism, and other progressive social ideas.

During this hunt, with his friend Gromeka, Tolstoy was armed with a German, double-barreled shotgun, but even so, the expedition nearly cost him his life. According to historian Arthur Stanley Turberville, after firing both of his barrels, and mortally wounding a mother bear protecting her cubs, he was charged, and bitten above and below the eye. But his shot was mortally-wounding, and he ended up using the snow to help reduce inflammation of his wound.

According to Barbara Lonnquist, in the Bear Hunt, a bear skin is treated as a ceremonious, good-luck charm by traditional Russian folklore, and, as according to Russian peasant tradition, it is used to give good luck to a marriage ceremony.

== See also ==
- Bibliography of Leo Tolstoy
- Twenty-Three Tales
