= The Cutting of the Forest =

1855 novella by Leo Tolstoy

"The Cutting of the Forest" (Russian:"Рубка леса" ["Rubka lesa"]; sometimes translated as The Wood-Felling) is a short novella by Leo Tolstoy written and published in 1855, early in Tolstoy's career.

It was in this story that Tolstoy distinguished between three different types of soldiers, "the submissive, the bossy, and the desperadoes." According to Ralph Henry Elsworth, this work was written about the same time as The Cossacks, published in 1863.

== See also ==
- Bibliography of Leo Tolstoy
