= Walk in the Light While There is Light =

Short story by Leo Tolstoy

"Walk in the Light While There is Light" is a short story by Leo Tolstoy written in 1893. According to famed Tolstoy-translators Louise Maude and Aylmer Maude, this story reflects Tolstoy's interest with early Christians, and according to translator Huntington Smith, this is a story about the early times of Christianity.

Aylmer Maude suggests that this story, and the ideas that inspired it, inspired the failed commune organized by followers of Tolstoy, Whiteway Colony. According to Maude, Tolstoy was ashamed of this story, partly because it portrayed bad heathens and good Christians as distinct groups when in reality they would have been mixed.

According to literary critic Malcolm Jones in a Cambridge University Press collection, this work is frequently recommended to aspiring Tolstoy scholars as seminal reading.

== See also ==
- Bibliography of Leo Tolstoy
