= Leo Tolstoy bibliography =

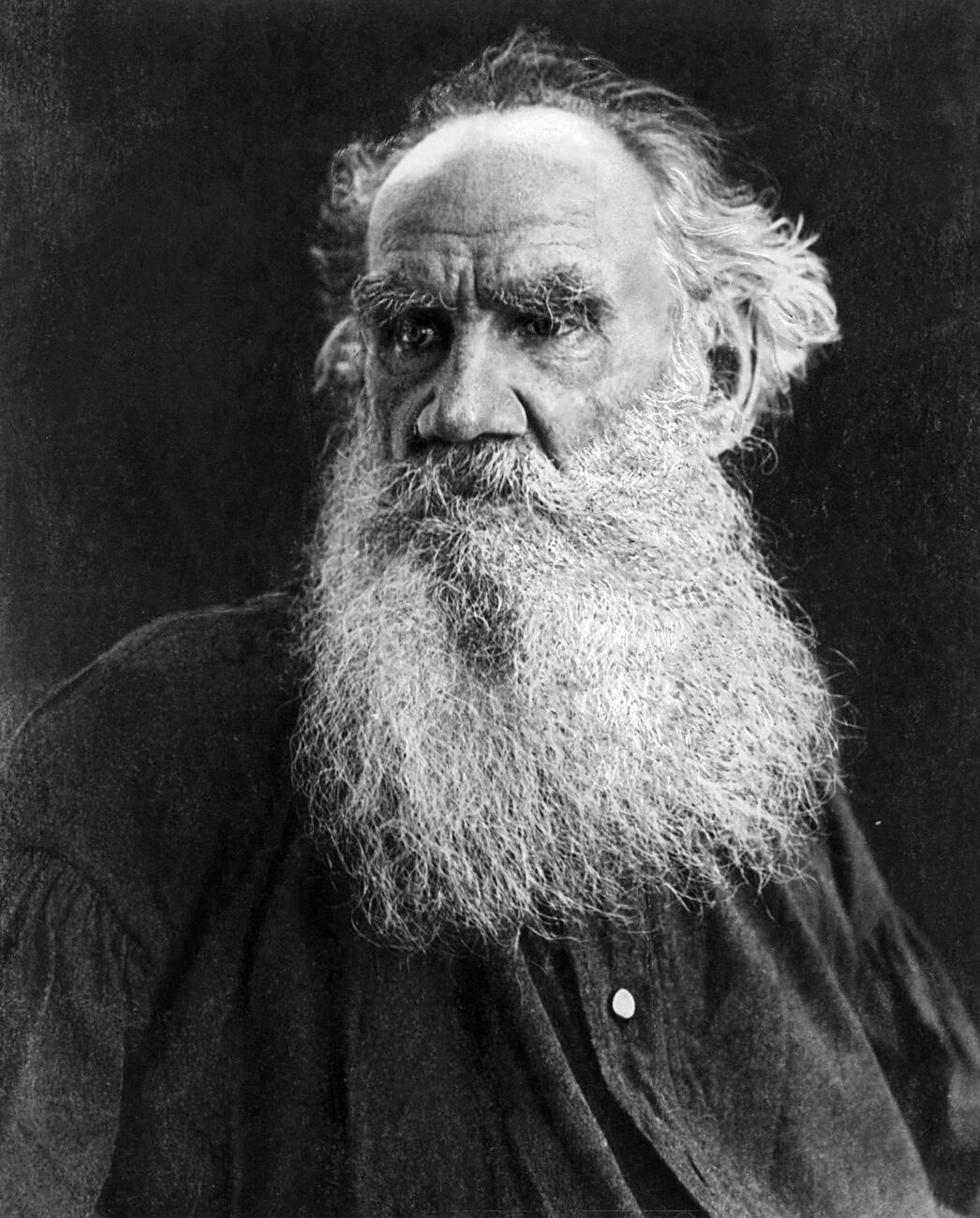
- Leo Tolstoy in his later years; early-20th century

This is a list of works by Russian writer Leo Tolstoy (1828–1910), including his novels, novellas, short stories, fables and parables, plays, and nonfiction.

== Prose fiction ==
=== Novels ===
- The Autobiographical Trilogy
  - Childhood (Детство, 1852)
  - Boyhood (Отрочество, 1854)
  - Youth (Юность, 1857)
- Cossacks (Казаки, 1852–1863)
- War and Peace (Война и мир, 1864–1869, rev. 1873)
- Anna Karenina (Анна Каренина, 1875–1877)
- Resurrection (Воскресение, 1889–1899)

=== Novellas ===
- Landowner's Morning (Утро помещика, 1856)
- Two Hussars (Два гусара, 1856)
- Family Happiness (Семейное счастье, 1859)
- Polikúshka (Поликушка, 1860)
- The Death of Ivan Ilyich (Смерть Ивана Ильича, 1882–1886)
- Walk in the Light While There is Light (Ходите в свете, пока есть свет, 1888)
- Kreutzer Sonata (Крейцерова соната, 1887–1889)
- Devil (Дьявол, 1889, pub. 1911)
- Master and Man (Хозяин и работник, 1895)
- Father Sergius (Отец Сергий, 1890–1898)
- The Forged Coupon (Фальшивый купон, 1902–1904)
- Hadji Murat (Хаджи-Мурат, 1896–1904)

=== Short stories ===
- "Raid" ("Набег", 1852)
- "The Cutting of the Forest" (1855)
- "Billiard-marker's Notes" ("Записки маркера", 1855)
- Sevastopol Sketches (Севастопольские рассказы, 1855–1856)
  - "Sevastopol in December 1854" (1855)
  - "Sevastopol in May 1855" (1855)
  - "Sevastopol in August 1855" (1856)
- "Snowstorm" ("Метель", 1856)
- "Meeting a Moscow Acquaintance in the Detachment: From the Caucasian notes of Prince Nekhlyudov" (1856, pub. 1887)
- "Lucerne: From the notes of Prince D. Nekhlyudov" ("Люцерн", 1857)
- "Albert" ("Альберт", 1857)
- "Three Deaths" ("Три смерти", 1858)
- "Excerpts from Stories from Village Life ("Отрывки рассказов из деревенской жизни") (1860–1862, pub. 1932)
- "The Porcelain Doll" (1863) (Note: A letter written with his wife to his wife's younger sister that is treated by critics as a short story.)
- "Kholstomer" (aka "Strider") ("Холстомер", 1863–1886)
- "Nicholas Stick" (1886)
- "An Old Acquaintance" (1887)
- "A Dialogue Among Clever People" (used as an introduction to the novella Walk in the Light...) (1892)
- "After the Ball" ("После бала", 1903)
- "Alyosha the Pot" ("Алёша Горшок", 1905)
- "Berries" ("Ягоды") (1905)
- "Divine and Human" ("Божеское и человеческое", 1905)
- "Korney Vasiliev" ("Корней Васильев", 1905)
- "Why?" ("За что?", 1906)
- "What I saw in a Dream" ("Что я видел во сне", 1906)

=== Folk tales, fables and parables ===
- "What Men Live By" ("Чем люди живы", 1881)
- "Where Love Is, God Is" ("Где любовь, там и бог", 1885)
- "Two Brothers and Gold" (Два брата и золото) (1885)
- "Neglected Fire Can't be Extinguished" (aka "Quench the Spark") ("Упустишь огонь, не потушишь", 1885)
- "Two Old Men" ("Два старика", 1885)
- "Candle" ("Свечка", 1885)
- "Tale of a Fool" (aka "Ivan the Fool") ("Сказка об дураке", 1885)
- "Three Hermits" ("Три Старца", 1885)
- Stories for Lubki picture books (1885)
  - "Evil Allures, But Good Endures" (lit. "Enemy is Crafty, but God is Strong") ("Вражье лепко, а божье крепко")
  - "Little Girls are Wiser than Old Men" ("Девчонки умнее стариков")
  - "Ilyás" ("Ильяс")
- "How the Imp Earned the Crust" ("Как чертёнок краюшку выкупал", 1886)
- "Penitent Sinner" ("Кающийся грешник", 1886)
- "Grain as Big as a Chicken's Egg" ("Зерно с куриное яйцо", 1886)
- "How Much Land Does a Man Need?" ("Много ли человеку земли нужно", 1886)
- "Godson" ("Крестник", 1886)
- "Three Sons" ("Три сына", 1887)
- "Emelyan the Laborer and the Empty Drum" ("Работник Емельян и пустой барабан", 1891)
- "Dream of a Young Tsar" ("Сон молодого царя") (1894, pub. 1912)
- Three Untitled Parables (Три притчи) (1895)
- "Destruction and Restoration of Hell" ("Разрушение ада и восстановление его", 1902)
- Stories for Sholem Aleichem's Help: An Anthology for Literature and Art to aid the victims of the Kishinev pogrom (1903)
  - "Esarhaddon, King of Assyria" ("Ассирийский царь Асархадон")
  - "Work, Death, and Sickness"
  - "Three Questions" ("Три вопроса")

=== Adaptations ===
- "Croesus and Fate" (adaptation of the Greek legend) (1886)
- "Françoise" (adaptation of a story by Guy de Maupassant) ("Франсуаза", 1891) (Note: An alteration of Guy de Maupassant's "Port".)
- "The Coffee-House of Surat" (adaptation of a story by Bernardin de Saint-Pierre) ("Суратская кофейная", 1893)
- "Too Dear!" (adaption of a story by Guy de Maupassant) ("Дорого стоит", 1897)
- "Poor People" (adaptation of a story by Victor Hugo) ("Бедные люди") (1905)
- "Thief's Son" (adaptation of "Abused Before Christmas" by Nikolai Leskov) (1906)
- "Power of Childhood" (adaptation of Hugo's poem, "La guerre civile") ("Сила детства", 1908, pub. 1912)

=== Stories for children ===
==== From ABC (1872) and New ABC (1875) textbooks ====
- ABC (Book 1, part 2):
  - I. (22 Fables)
  - II.
    - The Sea
    - Blind and Deaf
    - How I stopped being afraid of Blind Beggars
    - Mouse-girl
    - Lipunyushka
  - III.
    - Elephant
    - Chinese Queen Silinchi
    - How the Bukharians Learned to Breed Silkworms
    - Eskimos
    - From Speed Comes Power
    - How they Repaired a House in the City of Paris
    - Where Does the Water from the Sea Go?
  - IV.
    - Fool (Poem)
    - Svyatogor Bogatyr (Bylina)
- ABC (Book 2, part 1):
  - I. (25 Fables)
  - II.
    - Girl and mushrooms
    - What kind of dew is on the grass?
    - The Indian and the Englishman (American story)
    - Old Horse
    - Orel (American)
    - Bear on a cart
    - Mad dog
    - Vest
    - The Lion and the Dog (American)
    - Sparrow
    - The Bishop and the Robber (Victor Hugo)
    - Lozina
    - 1000 Gold (French)
  - III.
    - Grass Snake (folk)
    - Luck (Indian)
    - Two brothers (Arabic)
    - Peter the Great and the Muzhik (Bezsonovo)
    - Three Thieves (Gebel)
    - An Equal Inheritance
  - IV.
    - Shat and Don (folk)
    - Volga and Vazuza (Vladimir Dal)
    - Sudoma (Perevlessky)
    - Golden-haired princess (Chizhov)
    - Cambyses and Psamenit (Herodotus)
    - Yermak
    - Owl and Hare
    - How Wolves Teach Their Children
    - Sparrow and swallows (Perevlessky)
    - Shark (American)
  - V. (Science Stories)
    - How a man removed a stone
    - Rolled cigarette
    - Warmth I
    - Warmth II
    - Warmth III
    - Why is there wind?
    - What is the wind for?
    - Why do windows sweat and there is dew?
    - Touch and vision
    - Magnetism I
    - Magnetism II
    - Magnetism III
  - VI. Sukhman (Bylina)
- ABC (Book 3, part 1):
  - I. - V. (19 Fables)
  - VI.
    - King's son and his comrades (Turkish)
    - The Righteous Judge (eastern fairy tale)
    - How a Man Divided Geese
    - Severe Punishment (Arabic)
    - The Tsar's Brothers (Gebel)
  - VII.
    - How I Learned to Ride
    - Soldier's Household
  - VIII. (Stories of My Dogs)
    - Bulka
    - Bulka and Boar
    - Pheasants
    - Milton and Bulka
    - Turtle
    - Bulka and Wolf
    - What Happened to Bulka in Pyatigorsk
    - The End of Bulka and Milton
    - Rusak
  - IX.
    - Foundation of Rome
    - How the Geese Saved Rome
    - Polycrates of Samos
    - God Sees the Truth, But Waits
  - X. (Science Stories)
    - Apple Trees
    - Bugs
    - Hare and Hound
    - Hares and Wolves
    - Senses
    - Why Does Frost Crack Trees?
    - Dampness I
    - Dampness II
    - Different Connections of Particles
    - Ice, Water and Steam
    - Crystals
  - XI. Volga Bogatyr (Bylina)
- ABC (Book 4, part 1):
  - I. (12 Fables)
  - II.
    - The King and the shirt (Arabic)
    - Why is there evil in the world (Indian)
    - Raven and little crows (Lithuanian)
    - The Wolf and the Man (folk)
    - The Tsar's New Dress (H. C. Andersen)
  - III.
    - Jump (American)
    - Hunting is Worse than Slavery (aka "The Bear Hunt")
  - IV. A Prisoner in the Caucasus
  - V. (Science Stories)
    - Fox tail
    - Silkworm
    - Old poplar
    - Bird cherry
    - How the trees walk
    - Specific gravity
    - Harmful air
    - Gases I
    - Gases II
    - How to make balloons
    - An Aeronaut's Tale
    - Galvanism
    - The sun is warm
  - VI. Mikulushka Selyaninovich (Bylina)
- New ABC:
  - Burden (Fable)
  - Big Stove (Fable)
  - Nakhodka (Story)
  - The Girl and the Robbers (Fairy Tale)
  - Walnut Branch (Fairy Tale)
  - Birdie (Story)
  - Three Bears (Fairy Tale)
  - How Uncle Semyon Talked About What Happened to Him in the Forest (Story)
  - Cow (Story)
  - Philippok (Story)

==== Additional stories for children ====
- "Karma" (Adaptation of a Hindu Tale) ("Карма", 1894)
- "Two Different Versions of the History of the Beehive" ("Две различные версии истории улья с лубочной крышкой") (1900, pub. 1912)
- "Wolf" ("Волк") (1908)

=== Unfinished ===
- "A Christmas Night" ("Святочная ночь") (1853, pub. 1928)
- "How Russian Soldiers Die" ("Как умирают русские солдаты") (1854, pub. 1928)
- "Uncle Zhdanov and Mr. Chernov" ("Дяденька Жданов и кавалер Чернов") (1854, pub. 1932)
- "Idyll" ("Идиллия") (1861–1862, pub. 1911)
- "Tikhon and Melanya" (1862)
- Novel set during the reign of Peter the Great (1870–1879) (fragments published as Peter the First, Prince Fyodor Shchetinin, and Hundred Years in 1936)
- "The Decemberists" (Декабристы) (Planned 1863, written 1878–1879, fragments published 1884) (Note: Planned but abandoned sequel to War and Peace.)
- "Who is Right?" ("Кто прав?") (1891–1893, pub. 1911)
- "Khodynka: An Incident of the Coronation of Nicholas II" ("Ходынка", 1898, published 1912)
- "Memoirs of a Madman" (1884–1903)
- "Posthumous Notes of the Hermit Fëdor Kuzmich" ("Посмертные записки старца Федора Кузьмича") (1905, published 1912)
- "Father Vasily" ("Отец Василий") (1906, pub. 1911)
- "There Are No Guilty People" (1909)

== Drama ==
=== Plays ===
- The Power of Darkness (Власть тьмы, 1886)
- The First Distiller (1886)
- The Fruits of Enlightenment (Плоды просвещения, 1889)
- The Light Shines in Darkness (unfinished, 1890)
- The Living Corpse (Живой труп, 1900; a.k.a. Redemption)
- The Cause of It All (1910)

=== Dialogues ===
- "Wisdom of Children"
- "Traveler and Peasant" ("Проезжий и крестьянин", 1909, published 1917)

== Non-fiction ==
=== Books ===
- Religious Treatise in Three Volumes (untitled)
  - Introduction: A Confession (1879–1880)
  - Vol. 1: A Criticism of Dogmatic Theology (1880–1882)
  - Vol. 2: The Four Gospels Harmonized and Translated (1880–1882)
    - The Gospel in Brief (Containing only the summaries and translations from Vol. 2) (1882)
  - Vol. 3: What I Believe (aka My Religion) (1884)
- What Shall We Do Then? (1886)
- On Life (1887)
- Power and Liberty (1888)
- The Kingdom of God Is Within You (1891–1894)
- What Is Art? (1897)
- Shakespeare and the Drama (1909)
- A Calendar of Wisdom (compilation; 1909)

=== Pamphlets ===
- Why Do Men Intoxicate Themselves? (1890)
- Christianity and Patriotism (1894)
- The Christian Teaching (1895)
- Patriotism and Government (1900)
- The Slavery of Our Times (1900)
- Need it Be So? (1900)
- The Only Means (1901)
- What Is Religion and What is its Essence? (1902)
- Appeal to the Working People (1902)
- Appeal to the Clergy (1902)
- Bethink Yourselves! (1904)
- A Great Iniquity (1905)
- The End of the Age (1905)
- The Meaning of the Russian Revolution (1907)
- The Law of Love and the Law of Violence (1908)
- The Inevitable Revolution (1909)

=== Articles ===
- Articles written for Tolstoy's Yasnaya Polyana journal on education (1861–1862)
  - "On Methods of Teaching the Rudiments"
  - "A Project of a General Plan for the Establishment of Popular Schools"
  - "Education and Culture"
  - "Are the Peasant Children to Learn to Write from Us?"
  - "The School at Yasnaya Polyana"
  - "Progress and the Definition of Education"
- "On Popular Education" (1874)
- "On the Moscow Census" (1882)
- "Church and State" (1882)
- "What is the Truth in Art?" (Introduction to a collection of stories, 1886)
- "What a Christian May Do" (1887)
- "The Holiday of Enlightenment of the 12th of January" (1889)
- "Afterward to Kreutzer Sonata" (1890)
- "On the Relation between the Sexes" (1890)
- Articles on the Famine
  - "The Terrible Question" (1891)
  - "On the Methods of Aiding the People Who Have Suffered from the Failure of Crops" (1891)
  - "Among the Suffering (Report up to April 12, 1892)" (1892)
  - "Account of the Money Contributed from April 12 to July 27, 1892" (1892)
  - "Conclusion to Last Report on the Aid to the Starving" (1893)
- "Non-Activity" (1893)
- "The Persecution of Christians in Russia" (1895)
- "God or Mammon?" (1895)
- "Shame!" (1895)
- Meaningless aspirations [Бессмысленные мечтания] (1895)
- "How to Read the Gospel and What is its Essence?" (1896)
- "The Beginning of the End" (1897)
- "Nobel's Bequest" (1897)
- "Famine or No Famine?" (1898)
- "Carthago Delenda Est" (1898)
- "Two Wars" (1898)
- "Where is the Way Out?: On the Condition of the Laboring Classes" (1900)
- "Thou Shalt Not Kill" (1900)
- "On Suicide" (1900)
- "On the Street Riots" (1901)
- "Reply to the Holy Synod's Decree of Excommunication" (1901)
- "The Soldiers' Memento" (1901)
- "The Officers' Memento" (1901)
- "To the Tsar and His Associates" (1901)
- "On Religious Toleration" (1902)
- "The Crisis in Russia" (1905)
- "Do Not Kill" (1906)
- "Love Each Other" (1906)
- I cannot be silent (1908)
- "The Only Command" (1909)
- "Three Days in the Village" ("Три дня в деревне", 1910) (Note: A non-fictional sketch.)
- "Singing In The Village" ("Песни на деревне", 1910)
- "A Talk With A Wayfarer" ("Разговор с прохожим", 1910)

=== Letters and correspondence ===
Among Tolstoy's countless letters and pieces of correspondence, the works below consist mostly of those that were published in Tolstoy's lifetime or shortly after his death.

- Letter to a Revolutionist (1886)
- Letter to N. N. Engelhard (1887)
- Letter to a Kind Youth (1887)
- "Manual Labor and Intellectual Activity": A Letter to a Frenchman, Romain Rolland (1888)
- Letter to A.V. Vlasov (1889)
- "On Non-Resistance to Evil" (1890)
- Letter to Sofia Tolstaya on the Famine (1892)
- Letters on Henry George (1893)
- "Religion and Morality": A reply to questions from the German Ethical Society (1894)
- "Replies to Critics"
  - Letter to the Editor of the Daily Chronicle (1895)
  - Letter to a Polish journalist, Marian Edmundovich (1895)
- "Reason and Religion" (1895)
- Correspondence with P. V. Verigin of the Dukhobors (1895–1896)
- "Patriotism or Peace": A letter to Manson (1896)
- "Non-Resistance": A letter to Ernest H. Crosby (1896)
- Letter to the Minister of Internal Affairs and to the Minister of Justice (1896)
- Letter to the Chief of the Irkutsk Disciplinary Battalion (1896)
- "On the Deception of the Church" (1896)
- "A Letter to the Liberals": to Alexandra Kalmykov (1896)
- Letter to Eugen Heinrich Schmitt (1896)
- Letter to the Dukhobors in the Caucasus (1897)
- "Three Phases of Life" (before 1899?)
- "Concerning the Congress of Peace": A letter to certain Swedes (1899)
- Letter to a Corporal (1899)
- "The Commune and the World": A letter to D. A. Khilkov (1899)
- Correspondence with the Dukhobors in Canada (1899–1900)
- Letter to Tsar Nicholas II (1900)
- Letters to Free Thought, a Bulgarian periodical (1901)
- Letter to the Tolstoy Society of Manchester, England (1901)
- Letter to an Orthodox Priest (1901)
- Letter to a French Pastor (1901)
- "On the Franco-Russian Alliance": A letter to Pietro Mazzini (1901)
- Letter to the Orthodox Clergy (1903)
- Letter to a Jew (1903)
- A Letter to a Hindu, the editor of the magazine Free Hindustan (1908)
- Correspondence with Gandhi (1909–1910)

=== Supplements to works of others ===
- "To N. N. Ge's Painting: 'Christ's Last Discourse with His Disciples'" (1886)
- Supplementary essay for Timofei Bondarev's The Triumph of the Farmer or Industry and Parasitism (1888)
- "Apropos of A. I. Ershov's Book Recollections from Sevastopol" (1889)
- Introduction to the Russian translation of Alice Stockham's Tokology: A Book for Every Woman (1890)
- "The First Step": An introduction to the Russian translation of Howard Williams's The Ethics of Diet (1891)
- Introduction to Henri-Frédéric Amiel's Journal (1893)
- Introduction to The Works of Guy de Maupassant (1894)
- Introduction to S. T. Semenov's Peasant Stories (1894)
- Epilogue to Drozhzhin's Life and Death (1895)
- "Help!": A postscript to "An Appeal to Help the Dukhobors Persecuted in the Caucasus" written by associates of Tolstoy (1896)
- Preface to Carpenter's article, "Modern Science" (1898)
- Introduction to W. von Polenz's Der Büttnerbauer (1902)

=== From Diary ===
- "A History of Yesterday" ("История вчерашнего дня") (1851)
- "Grateful Soil" ("Благодарная почва") (1910)

== Pedagogical works ==
=== ABC (Азбука) (1872) ===
==== BOOK 1 ====
- Part 1. Alphabet and Phonics
- Part 2. Reading (see Stories for Children)
- Part 3. Texts in Old East Slavic
  - Excerpts from Nestor's Primary Chronicle
  - Excerpts from Rostovsky's Chetya Minea
  - Excerpts from the Old and New Testaments
- Part 4. Arithmetic

==== BOOK 2 ====
- Part 1. Reading (see Stories for Children)
- Part 2. Texts in Old East Slavic
  - Excerpts from Nestor's Primary Chronicle
  - Excerpts from Rostovsky's Chetya Minea
  - Excerpts from the Old and New Testaments
- Part 3. Arithmetic
  - Addition and Subtraction

==== BOOK 3 ====
- Part 1. Reading (see Stories for Children)
- Part 2. Texts in Old East Slavic
  - Excerpts from Nestor's Primary Chronicle
  - Excerpts from the Old and New Testaments
- Part 3. Arithmetic
  - Multiplication and Division

==== BOOK 4 ====
- Part 1. Reading (see Stories for Children)
- Part 2. Texts in Old East Slavic
  - Excerpts from Nestor's Primary Chronicle
  - Excerpts from Rostovsky's Chetya Minea
  - Excerpts from the Old and New Testaments
- Part 3. Arithmetic
  - Decimals and Fractions

=== New ABC and Russian Books for Reading (1875) ===
==== New ABC (Новая Азбука) ====
- Combination of phonetic and grammatical instruction with many simple untitled stories and fables
- Titled Stories (see Stories for Children)
- Prayers in Old East Slavic

==== Russian Book for Reading (Русская Книга Для Чтения) (Volumes 1-4) ====
A collection of stories, most of which appeared in the four original ABC volumes.
