= Diary of a Madman =

Diary of a Madman may refer to:

== Films ==
- Diary of a Madman (film), a 1963 horror film starring Vincent Price
- Diary of a Madman (1990 film), directed by Ronan O'Leary, cinematography by Walter Lassally

== Literature ==
- "Diary of a Madman" (Nikolai Gogol), an 1835 short story by Nikolai Gogol
- "Diary of a Lunatic", an 1884 short story by Leo Tolstoy sometimes translated as "The Diary of a Madman"
- "Diary of a Madman" (Guy de Maupassant), an 1885 short story by Guy de Maupassant
- "Diary of a Madman" (Lu Xun), a 1918 short story by Lu Xun, also known as "A Madman's Diary"
- Diary of a Madman, a 2015 memoir by rapper Scarface

== Music ==
- Diary of a Madman (album), by Ozzy Osbourne, or the title track
- "Diary of a Madman" (song), by Gravediggaz
- The Diary of a Madman (opera), a 1958 chamber opera by Humphrey Searle

== See also ==
- Diary of a Maniac, a 1993 Italian drama film
- Diary of a Mad Old Man, a 1961 novel by Japanese author Jun'ichirō Tanizaki
