= A Lost Opportunity =

- Short story by Leo Tolstoy
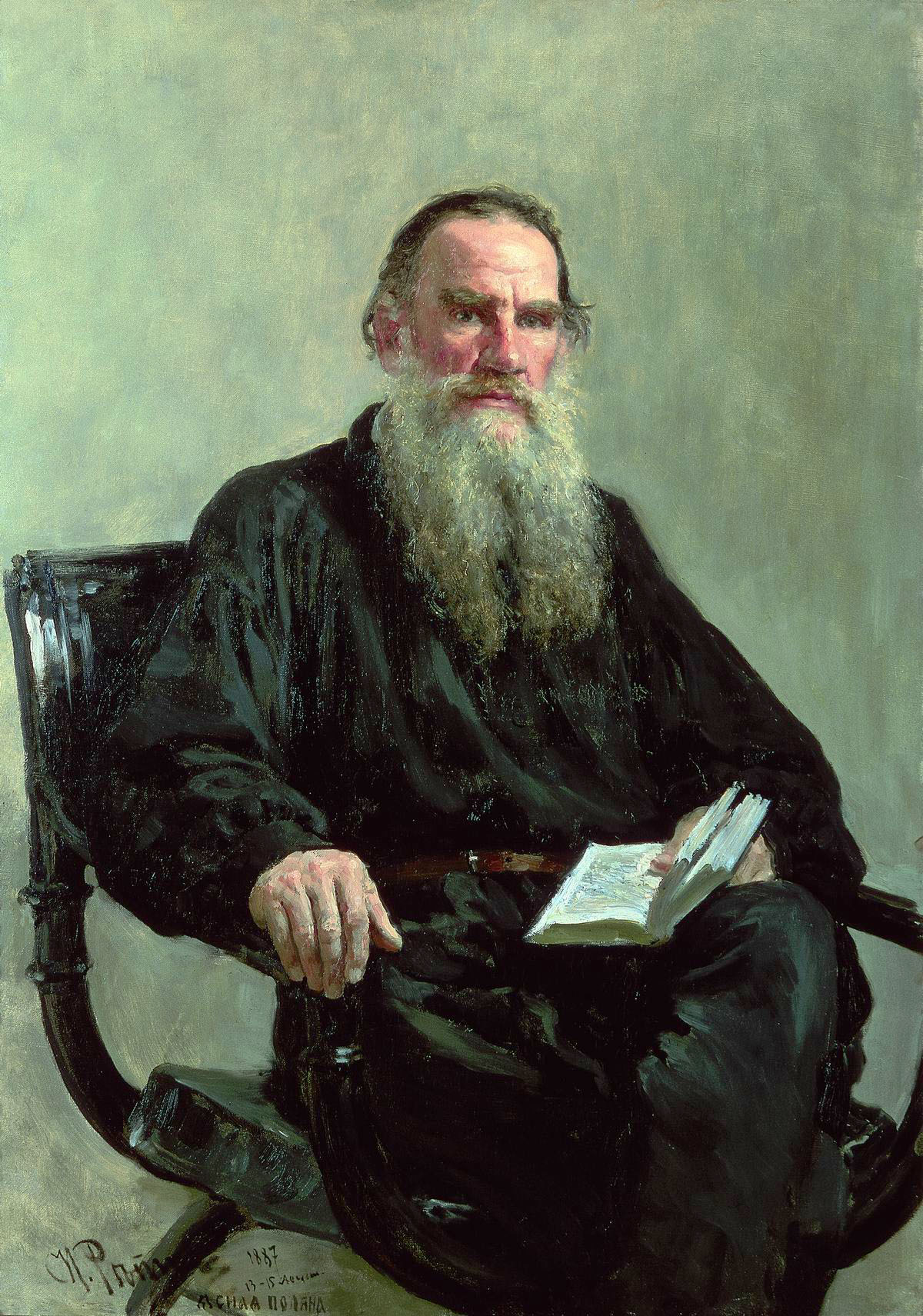
- Original title: A Lost Opportunity
- Country: United States
- Language: Russian to English Translation
- Genres: Fable, Short story

Publication
- Publication date: 1889

"A Lost Opportunity" is an 1889 fable by the Russian writer Leo Tolstoy. The story was included in The Kreutzer Sonata and Other Stories publication of 1889.

== Summary ==
"A Lost Opportunity" is a fable by Russian writer Leo Tolstoy. The story is prefaced with “The Parable of the Unforgiving Servant”, a parable of Jesus illustrating the importance of equity in receiving and giving forgiveness (Matthew 18.21-35). Written as a fable, "A Lost Opportunity" follows two neighboring families who are, at first, loving and respectful of one another. They treated each other as they wanted to be treated. Then the head of the families changed and the relationship between the families changed. Ivan and Gavryl were now the men in charge of their respective families and small arguments led to outright accusations of theft. The two families begin to feud with each other over small things. The wisdom offered by Ivan’s father is ignored and verbal assaults turned physical. The physical assaults climax into Gravyl burning down Ivan’s house, and the sparks from Ivan’s house ignite Gravyl’s house – both houses burn to the ground. The story ends with the two families returning a respectful temperament with each other as they rebuild their houses. (Summary, with permission, by author C. B. Carter)

== See also ==
- Leo Tolstoy bibliography
