= A Dialogue Among Clever People =

Short story by Leo Tolstoy

"A Dialogue Among Clever People" (AKA: "A Talk Among Leisured People") is a short story by Leo Tolstoy published in 1892. Aylmer Maude was one of the first translators.

According to literary critic Robert Ellsberg, in this story, an aristocrat articulates about happiness and concludes that happiness can best be found in the ideal of the simplicity, faith, and work of peasant life. Ernest Joseph Simmons and Лев Толстой (граф), writing for Modern Library suggested that this was when Tolstoy started making more complex and greater efforts to focus his literature on social issues. Elsewhere, Simmons, in a book devoted entirely to understanding Tolstoy, wrote that this story was ultimately about Tolstoy's own social class discussing their own futility of existence, with the two camps emerging, one in favor of simplicity and labor and the other opposed. According to self-help authors Dan Miller and Dave Ramsey, the most important quote by Tolstoy from the work is: "work, and not idleness, is the indispensable condition of happiness for every human being."

== See also ==
- Bibliography of Leo Tolstoy
