= Stories of My Dogs =

"Stories of My Dogs" is an eight-chapter novella by Leo Tolstoy published in 1888, translated to English by Nathan Haskell Dole. It details the adventures of his two dogs, Bulka and Milton.

It was republished in 1899 as part of the Complete Works of Tolstoy, edited by Isabel Florence Hapgood, and this collection itself was again republished in 1911. Editors in 1979 for Basic Books listed this book first when listing popular adventure stories by Leo Tolstoy.

== See also ==
- Leo Tolstoy bibliography
