= The Two Brothers and the Gold =

Short story by Leo Tolstoy

"The Two Brothers and the Gold" ("Два брата и золото") is a short story by Leo Tolstoy written in 1885.

== Influence ==
According to Nadejda Gorodetzky, this story discusses the joys of poverty if poverty is willingly accepted. According to the Cambridge Companion to Tolstoy, one should regard this text as different from other of Tolstoy's works, in that the narrator's stance is more objective and neutral.

== Publication history ==
The work was published in collections in 1882 (with translations by Aylmer Maude and editing by Leo Wiener and Charles Theodore Hagberg Wright), in 1903, and again in 2016.

== See also ==
- Bibliography of Leo Tolstoy
