= Old Acquaintance (disambiguation) =

Old Acquaintance may refer to:

- Old Acquaintance, a 1943 film drama
- Old Acquaintance (play)
- Old Acquaintance, an album by Conte Candoli
- "Old Acquaintance" (BoJack Horseman), a 2016 TV episode
- "Old Acquaintance" (Hustle), a 2005 TV episode
- "Old Acquaintance" (Magnum, P.I.), a 1985 TV episode
- "Old Acquaintance" (Not Going Out), a 2021 TV episode
- "An Old Acquaintance", a short story by Leo Tolstoy
- "Old Acquaintances", a 2023 episode of The Walking Dead: Dead City
