= Albert (short story) =

1858 short story by Leo Tolstoy

- Short story by Leo Tolstoy
- Country: Russia
- Language: Russian

Publication

"Albert" is a short story by Leo Tolstoy. It was originally published in 1858 in Sovremennik. The eponymous main character is a talented but drunken violinist who is invited to live with the nobleman Delesof, but who quickly sours the relationship by his continuous drinking and refusal to play.

Tolstoy began writing the story when on a trip to Dijon with fellow writer Ivan Turgenev in March, 1857. The story is partly autobiographical, inspired by a talented but drunken violinist named Rudolph, whom Tolstoy befriended in 1848 and had let live at Yasnaya Polyana for some time.

== Plot ==
At a ball hosted by Anna Ivánovna, the violinist Albert initially embarrasses himself by falling to the floor during a dance, though he impresses the party when he begins playing. One of the guests, Delesof, offers to let Albert live with him, despite Anna Ivánovna's advice against it.

The next evening, Albert disappears after dinner. Delesof orders his lackey, Zakhár, to find Albert, and to not give him drink or let him leave the house without Delesof's permission. When Zakhár returns with Albert, the latter demands more to drink, to which Delesof complies. Albert plays some violin, but quickly decides that he is too drunk to continue. They talk about the opera instead, Albert admitting that he cannot go any more because he is too poor. Denesof asks if he has ever been in love. Albert reveals that he once fell in love with a spectator, a famous aristocratic woman, while he was playing at the opera. He explains that he would sleep in her box in the theater, that he would have visions of talking to her and that he had once visited her home, something he admits was a mistake.

The next few days, Albert keeps demanding alcohol and refuses to play, to the great annoyance of his host. One night, Delesof is awoken by a commotion in the anteroom, where he finds Zakhár blocking the door as Albert declares that he is being detained and will go to the police. Zakhár explains that Albert had stolen and drank a whole decanter of vodka. Delesof decides to let Albert go. As Zákhar escorts him out, Albert keeps shouting that he will call for the police and that the two have been trying to murder him.

Albert wanders the streets in the night, not feeling the cold thanks to the alcohol. He enters a church, where he finds a group of people – including Delesof and Albert's old friend Petrof – discussing him. Delesof declares Albert a harmful drunk, Petrof defends him as "better and happier than all the rest of you." Albert tries to approach Petrof, who fails to recognise him and angrily dismisses him. Back on the streets, he decides to go to Anna Ivánovna's, but there he is told that they have been forbidden to let him in. Albert returns to the church, which is now empty. He finds a glass violin which he plays by rubbing it to his breast. When he is finished playing, he feels a woman's hand on his shoulders, and turns to find the lady from the opera. She takes him in her arms and carries him out of the church.

The next morning, two guests exit Anna Ivánovna's rooms to find Albert lying on the threshold, unconscious. They bring him in, as Albert mutters "Oh! I am alive, why do you bury me?"

== Publication and reception ==
"Albert" was published in Sovremennik (The Contemporary) in August 1858. The editor, Nikolay Nekrasov, was hesitant to publish it, complaing in of the "tendentiousness and banality" of the story. Nekrasov's reaction to the story ultimately led to Tolstoy's break with Sovremennik.

On publication, reception was generally negative. Knowles writes of "Albert" and "Lucerne", published one year earlier, that they "prove[d] to many people that their belief in Tolstoy’s early high promise had been unjustified."

== See also ==
- Bibliography of Leo Tolstoy
