= Two Hussars =

Novella by Leo Tolstoy

"Two Hussars" ("Два гусара" ["Dva gusara"]) is a novella by Leo Tolstoy published in 1856, and translated into English several times, including by Nathan Haskell Dole and Aylmer Maude. This is a novel in which one generation struggles against an earlier generation, or Tolstoy's generation is in struggle against that of his father. Tolstoy translator Aylmer Maude describes the text as a "a rollicking tale with flashes of humor resembling Charles Lever's." Russian and Soviet literary scholar Boris Eikhenbaum has suggested that the introduction to Two Hussars was actually intended to be in The Decembrists, the incomplete novel that was supposed to be the following installment of War and Peace.

== Publication history ==
It has frequently been republished as a companion text to the novella Polikúshka, in 1950 and 2010.

== See also ==
- Bibliography of Leo Tolstoy
