= The Porcelain Doll (by Tolstoy) =

Short story by Leo Tolstoy

"The Porcelain Doll" is an 1863 letter by Leo Tolstoy and his wife Sonya Tolstoy to the sister of his wife (Tatiana Behrs), which is treated by literary critics as a short story. In this story, according to literary critic David Holbrook, Tolstoy tells of his concern for his wife and how he had dreamed of Sonya entering his room at night. Later in the story, the woman turns into a porcelain doll that needs protection from the vulnerability of shattering. According to literary critic Randall Jarrell, who examined the piece, it was written six months after Tolstoy married Sonya.

== Sexual symbolism ==
According to literary critic Anne Edwards, in a work linking Tolstoy's understanding of women with his fear of death, Tolstoy's wife was pregnant at the time of his writing it, and the phrase "porcelain doll" was probably also about Tolstoy's own feelings about women having "no responsiveness or desires." This view is supported by Anthony Ferguson, who detailed the story of the porcelain doll in The Sex Doll: A History. The Russian literary critics and well-known translators of Sonya's diaries, Sofʹi︠a︡ Andreevna Tolstai︠a︡ and O. A. Golinenko, suggested that the story reflected their emotional state in their early marriage.

== See also ==
- Bibliography of Leo Tolstoy
