= Lucerne (by Tolstoy) =

Short story by Leo Tolstoy

"Lucerne: From the Recollections of Prince D. Nekhliudoff" ("Из зaписок князя Д. Нехлюдовa. Люцерн", "Iz zapisok knyazya D. Nekhlyudova. Lyutsern") is a first person narrative, in the form of diary and based on personal experiences, written by Leo Tolstoy in 1857 and translated into English in 1899 by Nathan Haskell Dole. It takes the form of a travel diary of someone in Lucerne, Switzerland.

== History of the work ==
Though classified by scholars as a short story, it is clear that this story is based on his personal experiences as noted in Tolstoy's Diaries, where Tolstoy also notes his travels through Zurich, Friedrichshafen, Stuttgart, Baden-Baden, Frankfurt, and Dresden. According to historian Henri Troyat, during his time in Lucerne, Tolstoy gambled heavily, writing one night in his diary, "Lost every cent, you pig!"

It was first published by Sovremennik ("The Contemporary") in 1857, after he first recited the work to the editor Nekrassof. His meeting with Nekrassof was in St. Petersburg, only a few weeks after his visiting Lucerne, and after getting it published, Tolstoy was back on the move toward Moscow.

== Literary evaluation ==
One literary critic at the Yale Press has described the work as one of "pantheistic despair," which originated as a letter, and whose key moment is when Tolstoy watches a busker musician who is performing in the street being unrewarded by cruel tourists.

== See also ==
- Bibliography of Leo Tolstoy
