= The Poor People =

Short story by Victor Hugo

"The Poor People" is a short story written by Victor Hugo in 1854, translated into Russian by Lidia Veselitskaya, and then rewritten or retold by Leo Tolstoy in 1908. It is the story of a woman, the protagonist ("Zhanna", "Jeanne" or "Jeanna", depending on the translator), her husband, their five children, and how some romantic feelings survive amidst their struggle in poverty. According to Sophia Tolstoy, in the story, the wife of another fisherman dies while giving birth, and Jeanne must take in the children.

According to American philologist John Andrew Frey, the work was first published in 1854 in the series "Legends of the Centuries."

It was republished in 1967 by University of California Press and in 2000 by Zondervan Publishing House.

== See also ==
- Bibliography of Leo Tolstoy
