= An Old Acquaintance =

Short story by Leo Tolstoy

"An Old Acquaintance" is a short story by Leo Tolstoy published in 1887. It is a military drama about an adventure in the Caucasus, where Prince Nekhlidudof finds an old acquaintance from Moscow. According to an editorial team led by literary legend G. K. Chesterton in 1904, it is an autobiographical story based on Tolstoy's experiences as a volunteer to the Russian Army where he served in 1851 as an artillery officer.

This work was written in the same work as other pieces like Two Hussars and A Russian Proprietor. Editors at Rowman & Littlefield suggested that an Old Acquaintance is a story of a well-born man who disgraces himself and becomes declassed. In 2014, the story was listed as #5 in the top 20 short stories of Tolstoy by Midwest Book Review.

== See also ==
- Bibliography of Leo Tolstoy
