= A Calendar of Wisdom =

1911 insight and wisdom collection by Leo Tolstoy

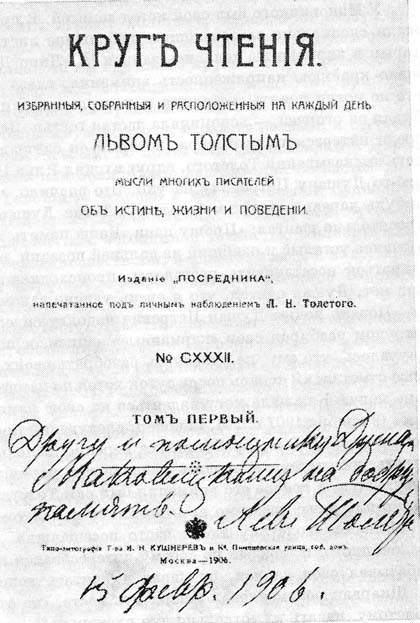
- Author: Leo Tolstoy
- Original title: Круг чтения, Krug chtenia
- Translator: Archibald J. Wolfe
- Language: Russian
- Subject: Philosophy
- Publication date: 1911
- English publication date: 1919

A Calendar of Wisdom (Russian: Круг чтения, Krug chtenia), also known as Path of life, A Cycle of Readings or Wise Thoughts for Every Day, is a collection of insights and wisdom compiled by Leo Tolstoy between 1903 and 1911 that was published in three different editions. An English translation by Archibald J. Wolfe of the first Russian edition, which was organized by subject, was published in 1919. An English translation of the second Russian edition, which was organized by calendar date, was begun in 1911 as a monthly serial but abandoned after the first volume. The first translation of the entire yearly cycle, but which omitted some of the individual readings, was made by Peter Sekirin and published in 1997. The book, whose title is literally translated as Circle of Reading, was described by Tolstoy as "a wise thought for every day of the year, from the great philosophers of all times and all people" which he himself would consult daily for the rest of his life. Teachings from historical figures including Epictetus, Marcus Aurelius, Lao-Tzu, Buddha, Pascal, Jesus, Muhammad, Confucius, Emerson, Kant, Ruskin, Seneca, Socrates, Thoreau prompted Tolstoy to write in the introduction, "I hope that the readers of this book may experience the same benevolent and elevating feeling which I have experienced when I was working on its creation, and which I experience again and again when I reread it every day, working on the enlargement and improvement of the previous edition."

The translator, Peter Sekirin, explains that this was Tolstoy's last major work. He put an enormous amount of effort into this collection over a period of 15 years. He carefully selected the contributors and they cover a wide range of philosophical views. Tolstoy grouped the thoughts according to a topic for each day of the year, and he added his own thoughts to each daily entry. An edition of A Calendar of Wisdom was published in Russia in 1912 but was forbidden by the Soviet regime. It was republished in Russia in 1995 and was a great success, selling over 300,000 copies.

== See also ==
- Leo Tolstoy bibliography
