= Three Deaths =

1859 short story by Leo Tolstoy

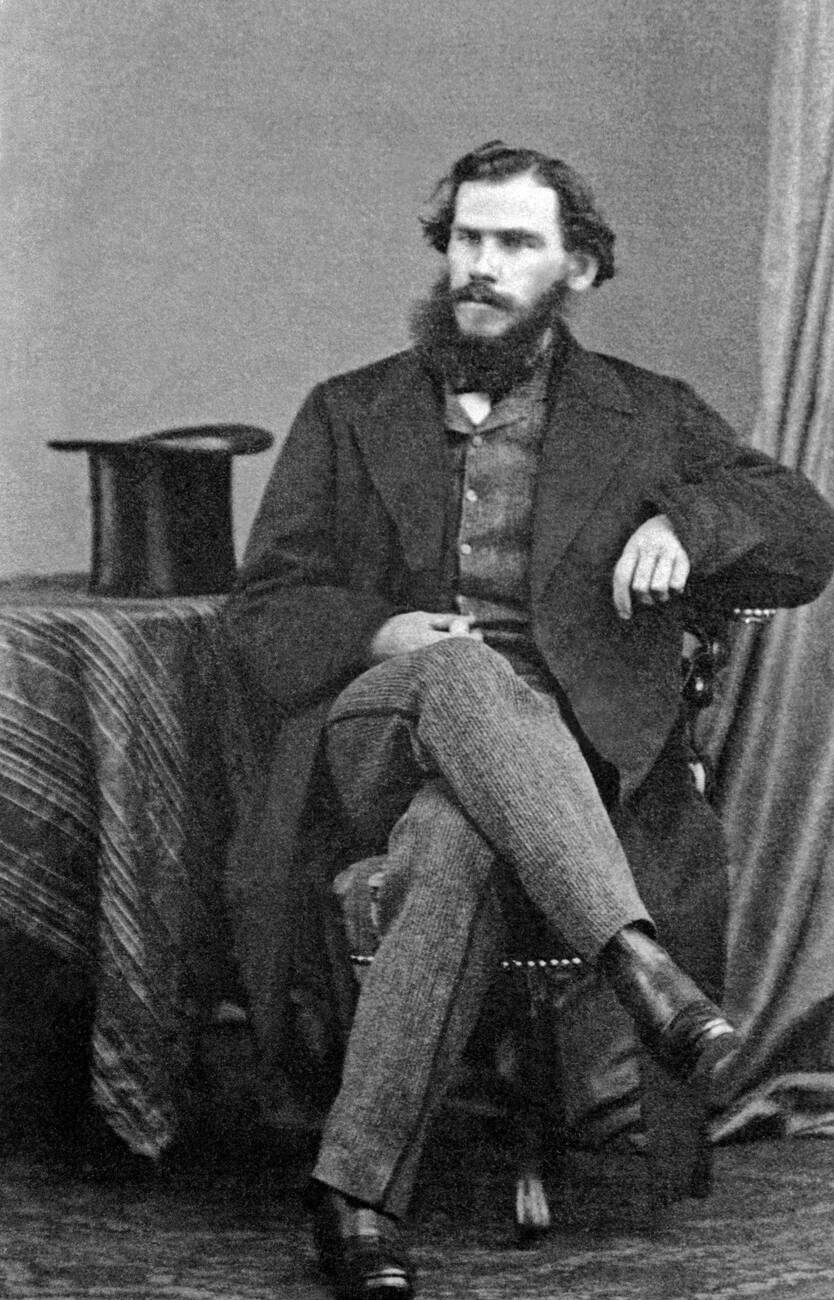
Image of Leo Nikolayevich Tolstoy in 1860

"Three Deaths: A Tale" (Russian: Три смерти, Tri smerti) is a short story by Leo Tolstoy first published in 1859. It narrates the deaths of three subjects: a noblewoman, a coachman and a tree.

== Synopsis ==
=== Chapter 1 ===
The story begins with a noblewoman named Lady Shirkinskaya and her maid riding in a carriage. The noblewoman, who is suffering from consumption, wears an expression of anger and scorn. The carriage, accompanied by a calèche, stops by a posting-station. The husband of the noblewoman and a doctor step out of the calèche, but the noblewoman refuses to leave her carriage. As the husband and the doctor discuss privately the noblewoman's unfavorable outlook, the posting-master's daughter, Masha, and her friend, Aksusha, run out to look at the Lady Shirkinskaya, vocally noting her sickly appearance. In fear that the noblewoman won't live through the journey, the husband suggests postponing and turning back home. Angrily she responds that they must go abroad for her recovery because the only thing she should do at home is die. At the mere mention of death, Lady Sirkinskaya grows quiet, pouts like a child, and begins to cry.

=== Chapter 2 ===
Inside the common room of the posting-station, a sick man introduced as Uncle Hvedor (a mispronunciation of Fyodor) lies on top of the stove. A young post-driver named Serega asks him for his boots, seeing as he won't need them anymore. Instead of answering the youth, Uncle Hvedor struggles to drink a cup of water. The post-driver asks again and this time the cook chimes in, pointing out that his cough only worsens and that a dead man does not need new boots. Having gathered his strength, Uncle Hvedor replies that he will give his boots to the post-driver on the condition that he buys him a headstone for his grave. The post-driver promises, but leaves; he later mentions to a fellow driver that he got the boots for seemingly nothing. The sick man remains on the stove; stifling his cough, he does not make a sound the entire evening. At the sight of the dying man, the cook takes pity and wraps his cold feet. That night, the cook dreams of Uncle Hvedor climbing down from the stove and leaving to chop wood. In this dream, Uncle Hvedor reassures her that he is well. Upon waking, the cook and the drivers in the posting-office discover he has died. After burying him, the cook tells everyone of her strange dream.

=== Chapter 3 ===
Spring has come. The story transitions back to the noblewoman, laying in her bedroom. Her condition has worsened. A priest waits on a divan outside, while the husband talks with his wife's sister. Afterwards, the sister attempts to comfort the noblewoman, who begins claiming that she has come to terms with death. This mature and faithful attitude leads the sister to say that Lady Shirkinskaya "is an angel" as she leaves the room. Proclaiming God's mercifulness, the noblewoman beckons her husband closer and commands him to send for the medicine the priest mentioned earlier. For a woman that has accepted her death, Lady Shirkinskaya continues to cling on to any hope of living. That evening, she died in her large apartment with closed doors.

=== Chapter 4 ===
A marble monuments marks the noblewoman's grave, but Uncle Hyedor's remains without a headstone. The cook tells the young post-driver Serega that it would be a shame to not make good on his promise. Serega responds that he will buy the headstone when he is in town, but meanwhile settles on erecting a wooden cross to mark the grave. The next morning, Serega takes his axe and cuts down a tree. After the tree crashes down, its neighbors look more beautiful in the new free space; their branches rustle sublimely over the fallen body.

== Interpretation ==
The story affirms the ideal of man leading a simple, authentic life alongside nature through its portrayal of attitudes toward death.

The author himself gave a thorough interpretation of his work in a letter to A.A. Tolstoy:

"My thought was: three creatures died -- a noblewoman, a muzhik, and a tree. The noblewoman is pathetic and disgusting, because she lied her entire life and continues to lie before death. Christianity, as she understands it, does not resolve for her the question of life and death. Why die, when you want to live? She believes with her imagination and intellect in Christianity's promise of the future, but her entire being rears up, and there is no other comfort (except a false Christian one), -- and the place is taken. She is disgusting and pathetic. The muzhik dies calmly, exactly because he isn't a Christian. His religion is different, although by custom he performed the Christian rites; his religion is nature, with whom he lived. He himself cut down the trees, sowed rye and mowed it, killed rams, and had rams born, and children were born, and old men died, and he knew this law well; this law, from which he never turned away, like the noblewoman did, he directly and simply looked it in the face... The tree dies quietly, honestly, and beautifully. Beautifully, because it does not lie or break; it is not scared or sorry."

== See also ==
- Leo Tolstoy bibliography
