= Diary of a Lunatic =

Short story by Leo Tolstoy

"Diary of a Lunatic" (sometimes translated as "Memoirs of a Madman" and "The Diary of a Madman") is a short story by Leo Tolstoy written in 1884.

According to literary critic Janko Lavrin, in August, 1869, Tolstoy travelled from Nizhny Novgorod (AKA: Gorky) to the Penza district and slept overnight in the town of Arzamas. But he couldn't sleep, though, and was overwhelmed with a maddening fear of death. Many years later he recounted this experience in written form, and Diary of a Lunatic was the result. The title of the story is a reference to Nikolai Gogol's story "Diary of a Madman".

== Literary analysis ==
According to literature professor Inessa Medzhibovskaya, this unfinished work uses an encounter with possible death as a flame to a spiritual awakening, though the conflict remains of misunderstanding between the real world and the spiritual one. According to the editors at the Berkeley Undergraduate Journal, this work was an unfinished fragment, a deeply personal, autobiographical or autobiographical-like, first-person narrative whose resolution exists only within the Death of Ivan Ilyich, as Ivan Ilyich is just Diary of a Lunatic "prefigured in a different form." According to the Cambridge Companions, this is a work which describes Tolstoy's crises in veiled form.

This work is elsewhere very popular in literary analysis in universities, such as with professors and authors Henry W. Pickford at Duke University, and Ernest J. Simmons at Cornell, Harvard, and Columbia.

== See also ==
- Bibliography of Leo Tolstoy
