= Non-Activity =

1893 article by Leo Tolstoy

"Non-Activity" is an 1893 article by Leo Tolstoy and also the term used to describe Tolstoy's form of anarchist and pacifist thought. This thinking of Tolstoy's was influenced by wuwei (無為, "inaction"), a Taoist concept of finding victory by withdrawing from action. Sometimes Tolstoy's "non-activity" is translated as "under-activity" and others have called it "non-violent non-cooperation."

== Content ==
Maxim Gorky has described Tolstoy's "misty preaching of 'non-activity', of 'non-resistance to evil', the doctrine of passivism" as being the result of the natural fermentation of old Russian blood with Mongolian fatalism. According to Henri Troyat and Alexander Lukin, Tolstoy found the ideals of ancient, Chinese philosophy to nicely contrast against the over-industrialized and overly-scientific achievements of the Western Capitalist world. This admiration was cross-cultural, as Chinese and Japanese anarchists had preferred Tolstoy's pure, agrarian Anarchism over the scientific, modernized anarchism of Peter Kropotkin or Mikhail Bakunin. Tolstoy even translated Laozi into Russian. This translation was made from a German and French text of Tao Te Ching, and this project took Tolstoy a decade. According to Harold D. Roth, it was finally completed in 1893–4.

== History ==
This work was translated to French as "Le non-agir".

== See also ==
- Bibliography of Leo Tolstoy
