= Whiteway Colony =

Residential community in Gloucestershire, UK

Coordinates: 51°47′26″N 2°07′01″W

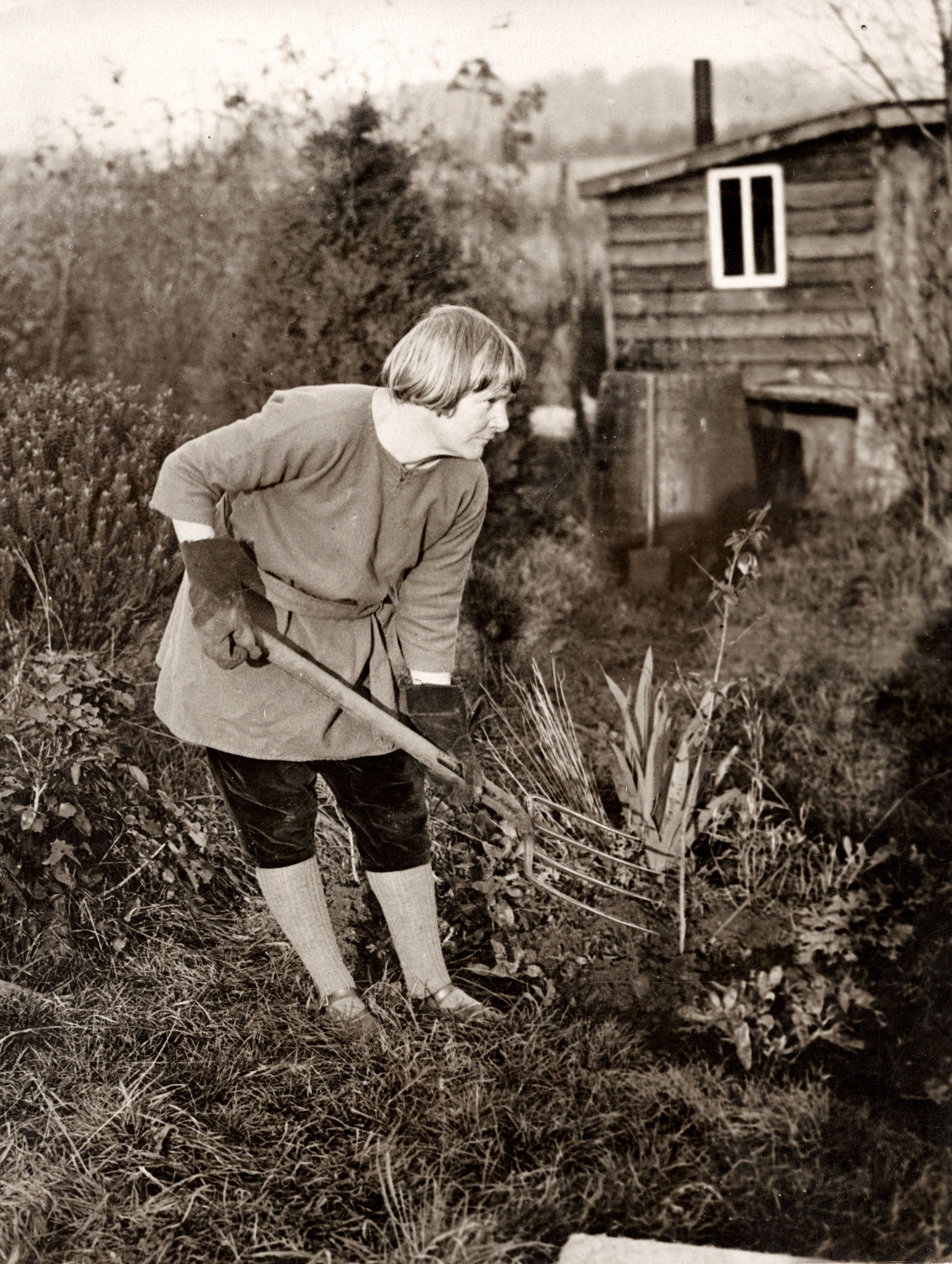
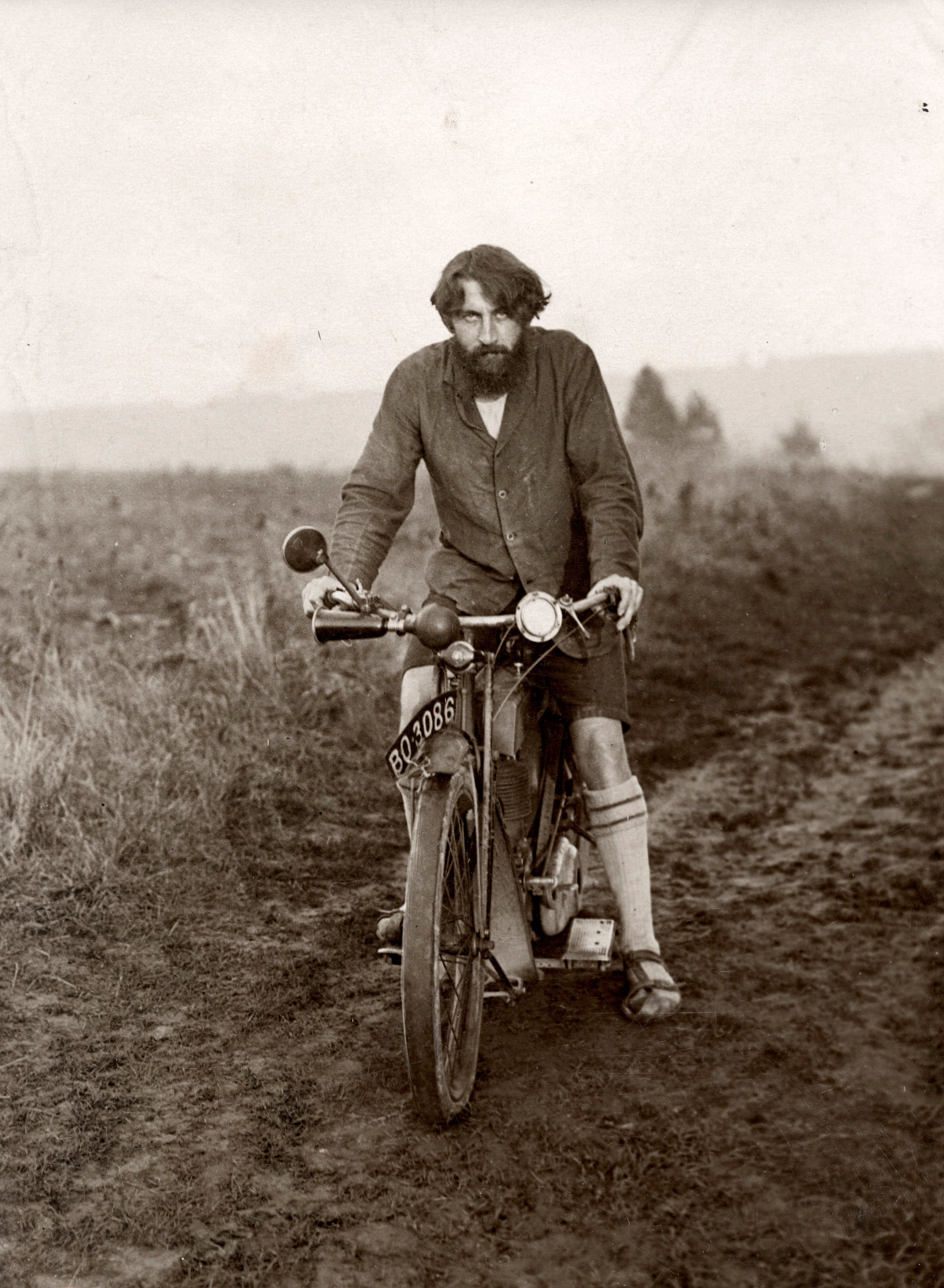
Residents of Whiteway Colony in the 1920s

Whiteway Colony is a residential community in the Cotswolds in the parish of Miserden near Stroud, Gloucestershire, United Kingdom. The community was founded in 1898 by Tolstoyans and today has no spare land available with over sixty homes and 120 colonists. At the beginning, private property was rejected and personal property shared; however, today the colonists' homes are privately owned and sold at market value. As the colony abandoned Tolstoy's philosophy it has been regarded by many, including Mohandas Gandhi who visited in 1909, as a failed Tolstoyan experiment.

== History ==
The colony was set up in 1898 by a Quaker journalist, Samuel Veale Bracher, along with other Tolstoyans. Bracher purchased 41 acres (17 ha) along with seeds, tools, materials and provisions. The colonists then burnt the property deeds on the end of a pitchfork in a symbolic rejection of the notion of property. Aylmer Maude led the founding board of trustees for the colony. According to Maude, the story by Leo Tolstoy that inspired the commune settlers to come together and found their colony was "Walk in the Light While There is Light".

The early settlers had utopian socialist ideals, sharing provisions and going back-to-the-land. The founding colonists numbered about eight but over time the community rose to forty with anyone welcome. However Bracher, his family and other founders left the colony soon afterwards as they became increasingly frustrated with the other residents' idleness.

Early life in the colony was spartan with some residents using a barn as shelter - piped water did not arrive until 1949 and electricity not until 1954. The site was originally open land surrounding Whiteway House but is now heavily wooded and home to a collection of mainly wooden buildings - as no one owns the land, mortgages could not be obtained so people had to build their own houses. A court ruling in 1955 established that nobody owns the legal title for the land. A communal hall was built by residents in 1924 to house social activities and a school, and a swimming pool was built in 1969. Whiteway Colony is still in existence today and houses, among others, descendants of its original settlers. Though it no longer has an explicitly anarchist character, today's residents are aware, and proud, of its origins. Traces of them run through the community still, the best examples being the continued use and maintenance of communal facilities (hall, swimming pool and playing field). In addition, the governance of the community is still done by a general meeting of its residents.

Over the years residents have included immigrant anarchists, conscientious objectors and refugees from the Spanish Civil War, as well as co-operative ventures such as Protheroe's Bakery, the Cotswold Co-operative Handicraft guild and the Co-operative Gardening Group. For a period the anarchist newspaper Freedom was produced here by Thomas Keell.

== See also ==
- Brotherhood Church
