= Thou Shalt Not Kill (essay) =

1890 article by Leo Tolstoy

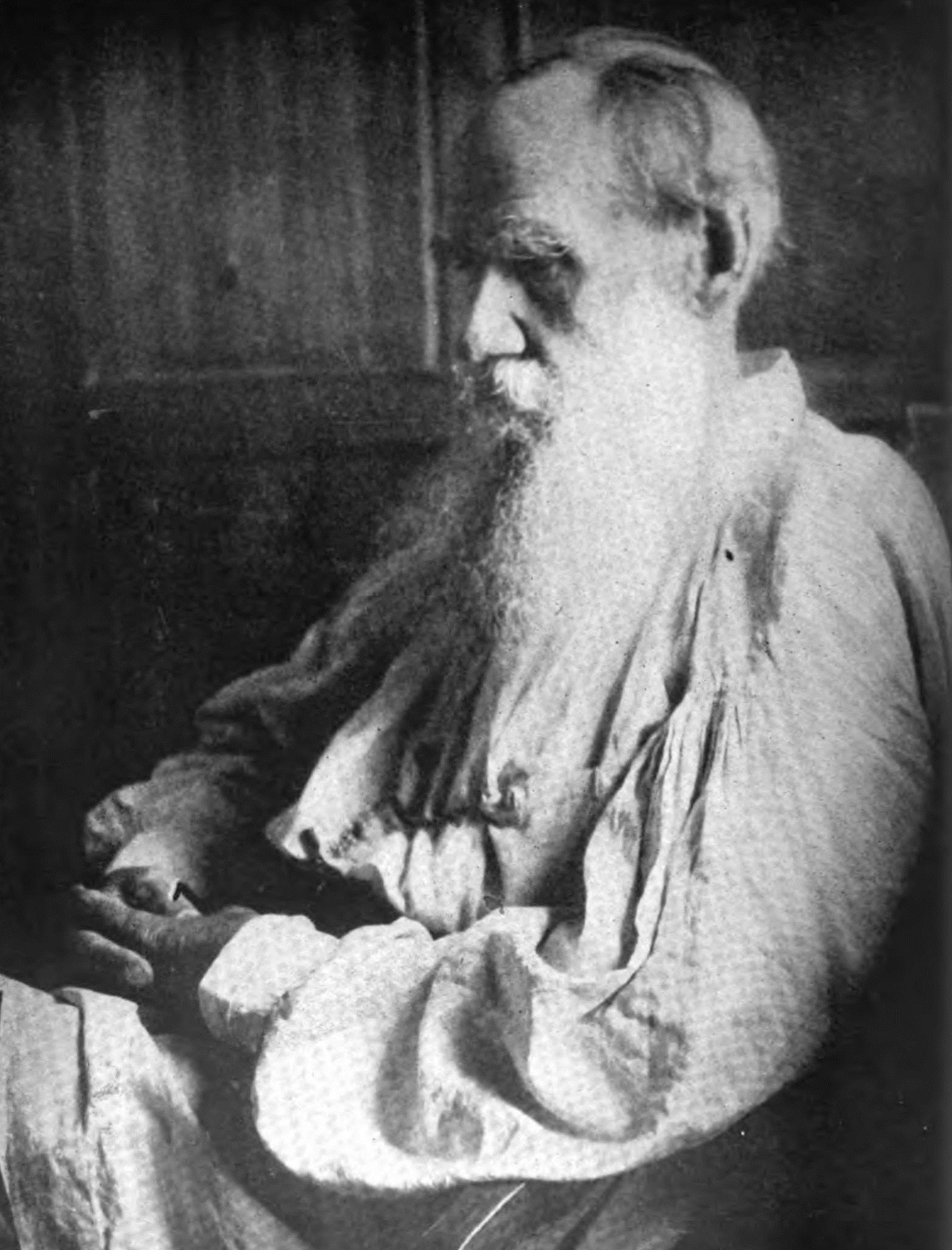
Tolstoy in contemplation.

"Thou Shalt Not Kill" is an article by Leo Tolstoy. Written in 1890, it was immediately censored by the Russian censors, and was finally published on August 8, 1900. It is about how rulers, kings, and presidents are murderers for ordering armies to commit murder, and how the assassinations of such rulers should come as no surprise.

== Content ==
According to Tolstoy academic Rosamund Bartlett, the event inspiring Tolstoy to write it was the assassination of Umberto I of Italy. According to historian Derk Bodde, in it, Tolstoy expresses his outrage at the rulers of the world who order armies to commit murders, and how they are hypocritical for opposing terrorism for its violence when it is the rulers of nations who commit the greatest violence.

The theme is deeply anarchist in tone and mood, as Tolstoy wrote that the suffering of the world is "caused not by particular persons, but by the particular order of society under which the people are so tied up together that they find themselves all in the power of a few men..." When asked to comment on the pamphlet, which he said he had forgotten writing in 1907, Tolstoy said "It says just what the title indicates, and nothing else... simply that Christians should not kill any one, either directly or indirectly, by aiding murderers." Professor Charlotte Alston summarized the work by saying that assassinations of kings and rulers is typical and expectable in nations where these same rulers order others to commit murder.

== Legacy ==
It was translated by Leo Weiner and Aylmer Maude in 1900. At the request of the Russian authorities, in 1903, the German government censored the work and destroyed all copies found.

In 1908, Vladimir Molotshnikov was arrested in Novgorod by the Okhrana for smuggling copies of Tolstoy into the country, and among the works found were several copies of "Thou Shalt Not Kill". According to Philip Bullock and Rebecca Beasley, academics of Russian literature, Charles William Daniel was arrested in Britain during the First World War for distributing this work; he presented a copy of this pamphlet specifically to the jury at his trial.

== Elsewhere in Tolstoy's Work ==
The theme of "Thou Shalt Not Kill" having implications for the modern, established political order is explored in other of Tolstoy's works, such as: The Kingdom of God is Within You (1894), Traveler and Peasant (1909), What I Believe (AKA: My Religion) (1884), and Last Message to Mankind (1909).

== See also ==
- Bibliography of Leo Tolstoy
