= There Are No Guilty People =

Short story by Leo Tolstoy

"There Are No Guilty People" (also known as: "There Are No Guilty People in the World") is a short story by Leo Tolstoy written in 1909. According to the Cambridge Companion on Tolstoy, the work is directed against the death penalty. It was incomplete, and when published after Tolstoy's death, resulted in a flood of letters, the reaction mixed. The government tried to censor the work, sentencing one person distributing copies of it to prison.

== Composition and Publication ==
According to literary critic Andrei Zorin, it was written in 1909, near his death (1910), when Tolstoy was physically unable to write fiction, that he had composed this piece. During this time, Tolstoy wrote in his diary that he still wanted to produce artistic work, "but without real desire of the kind I had before with a clear goal, but without any goal or rather with a hidden and unattainable goal of peering into the human soul."

This story is included in many of the popular collections of Leo Tolstoy's work, such as "The Forged Coupon and Other Stories" (1911) and "Leo Tolstoy's 20 Greatest Short Stories" (2009).

== See also ==
- Bibliography of Leo Tolstoy
