= A History of Yesterday =

Philosophical work by Leo Tolstoy

A History of Yesterday (История вчерашнего дня) is a non-fiction diary entry by Leo Tolstoy written in 1851 and later republished in English in 1928, and then again in 1949, when it was translated by George Kline. It is one of his earliest-written pieces available in English.

According to Salon in 2015, Tolstoy said his choice to write this work was "not because yesterday was extraordinary in any way... but because I have long wished to tell the innermost [zadushevnuiu] side of life in one day. God only knows how many diverse... impressions and thoughts... "

Author A. N. Wilson describes the diary entry as a description of Tolstoy's early indolence, about how he was transformed, about his soirées (parties) at the residence of the Volkonsky's in Moscow, and describes it as a "snapshot of some of the undeveloped elements of his genius before they 'gelled' or came together."

== See also ==
- Leo Tolstoy bibliography
