= The Cause of It All =

1910 play by Leo Tolstoy

The Cause of It All is a play in two parts by Leo Tolstoy published in 1910, and later translated by Aylmer and Louise Maude. It heavily features anti-alcohol and teetotaling themes.

It is recommended reading according to the 1925 publication, "A Study of the Modern Drama," according to Barrett Harper Clark. It is quoted in a 2013 text about Tolstoy's work called "the Best Stories Don't Come from Good Vs. Bad But Good Vs. Good".

== Links ==
- Source of text.
  - The Cause of It All, at RevoltLib.com
  - The Cause of It All, at Marxists.org
  - The Cause of It All, at TheAnarchistLibrary
  - The Cause of It All, at Google Books
  - The Cause of It All, at Gutenberg.org
