= Rosemary Edmonds =

British translator (1905–1998)

Rosemary Lilian Edmonds, née Dickie (20 October 1905 – 26 July 1998), was a British translator of Russian literature whose versions of the novels of Leo Tolstoy have been in print for 50 years.

== Biography ==
Rosemary Dickie was born in London, grew up in England, and studied English, Russian, French, Italian and Old Church Slavonic at universities in England, France and Italy. She married James Edmonds in 1927. The marriage was later dissolved.

During World War II Rosemary Edmonds was translator to General de Gaulle at Fighting France Headquarters in London, and after Liberation, in Paris. After this Penguin Books commissioned a series of translations from her. Tolstoy was her speciality.

Her translation of Anna Karenina, entitled Anna Karenin, appeared in 1954. In a two-volume edition, her translation of War and Peace was published in 1957. In the introduction she wrote that War and Peace "is a hymn to life. It is the Iliad and Odyssey of Russia. Its message is that the only fundamental obligation of man is to be in touch with life . . . Life is everything. Life is God . . . To love life is to love God." Tolstoy's "private tragedy", she continues, "was that having got to the gates of the Optinsky monastery, in his final flight, he could go no further, and died." She also published translations of Alexander Pushkin and Ivan Turgenev.

Later in life she released translations of texts by members of the Russian Orthodox Church. In 1982 her translation of the Orthodox Liturgy was published by the Oxford University Press, "primarily for the use for the Stavropegic Monastery of St. John the Baptist at Tolleshunt Knights in Essex". She had learned Old Church Slavonic to complete the project.

The Australian critic Robert Dessaix thought Edmonds' version of Anna Karenina, though not entirely satisfactory, reproduced Tolstoy's voice more closely than that of Richard Pevear and Larissa Volokhonsky. The academic Henry Gifford wrote of her work as a translator that it "is readable and it moves lightly and freely; the dialogue in particular is much more convincing than that contrived by the Maudes", though he found her "sometimes lax about detail".

== Translations ==
- Leo Tolstoy (1954). Anna Karenin. Translator Rosemary Edmonds. Penguin Classics. ISBN 978-0-14-062449-6.
- Leo Tolstoy (1957). War and Peace. Translator Rosemary Edmonds, introduction by Rosemary Edmonds. Penguin Classics. ISBN 0-14-044417-3.
- Leo Tolstoy (1985). The Kreutzer Sonata And Other Stories. Translator Rosemary Edmonds. Penguin Classics. ISBN 1-4179-2321-0.
- Leo Tolstoy (1966). Resurrection. Translator Rosemary Edmonds. Penguin Classics. ISBN 978-0-14-044184-0.
- Leo Tolstoy. The Death of Ivan Ilyich: The Cossacks, Happy Ever After (Family Happiness). Translator Rosemary Edmonds. Penguin Classics.
- Leo Tolstoy (1964). Childhood, Boyhood, Youth. Translator Rosemary Edmonds. Penguin Classics. ISBN 978-0-14-044139-0.
- Ivan Turgenev (1965). Fathers and Sons. Translator Rosemary Edmonds. Penguin Classics. ISBN 0-14-044147-6.
- Alexander Pushkin. The Queen of Spades and Other Stories. Translator Rosemary Edmonds, introduction by Rosemary Edmonds. Penguin Classics. ISBN 0-14-044119-0.
- Sophrony Sakharov (1977). His Life is Mine: A Spiritual Testimony. Translator Rosemary Edmonds. Saint Vladimir's Seminary Press.
- Sophrony Sakharov (1988). We Shall See Him as He Is. Translator Rosemary Edmonds. Stavropegic Monastery of St. John the Baptist.
- Sophrony Sakharov (1996). On Prayer. Translator Rosemary Edmonds. Stavropegic Monastery of St. John the Baptist.

== See also ==
- Ann Dunnigan
- Constance Garnett
