= A Landowner's Morning =

1856 short story by Leo Tolstoy

"A Landowner's Morning", also translated as "A Morning of a Landed Proprietor" is a short story by Leo Tolstoy written and published in 1856, early in Tolstoy's career. It is a fragment of Tolstoy's unfinished Novel of a Russian Landowner.

== Publication history ==
In 1856, before Tolstoy signed a contract with The Contemporary, he promised a story to its main rival, Notes of the Fatherland. It was the era of a new tsar, when writers could say more about problems in Russia such as the serfdom, and when Turgenev published A Hunter's Notes. Tolstoy at the time was writing a large work called Novel of a Russian Landowner, which he considered then the most important of his works. Even at the beginning of his career, Tolstoy regarded writing as serving a social purpose, and not as existing solely for entertainment, and the novel was to be, as he said, "novel with a purpose": "I shall give an account of the evil of [the Russian?] government and if I find it satisfactory, then I shall devote the remainder of my life to working out a plan for an aristocratic, electoral system of government joined with a monarchic system, on the basis of existing alternatives. Here is an aim for a virtuous life." However, Tolstoy didn't continue working on it, and instead, he extracted a story from the written part of his novel. "A Landowner's Morning" was published in December 1856 in Notes of the Fatherland.

== Plot ==
The main character of the story is Prince Dmitri Nekhliudov, the semi-autobiographical character also featured in Tolstoy's trilogy Childhood, Boyhood and Youth; Nekhliudov is also the main character of Tolstoy's last novel Resurrection. The story tells about Nekhliudov's efforts to become a good manager of his property and to assist his serfs at the same time.

== Reception ==
The story was well received. Nikolai Chernyshevsky wrote in The Contemporary "that Tolstoy reproduces with remarkable mastery not only the external conditions of the everyday life of the inhabitants, but what is much more important, their point of view on things. He knows how to put himself into the soul of the peasants."

== English translations ==
- 1904, as"A Morning of a Landed Proprietor", by Leo Wiener.
- 1984, as "A Landowner's Morning", by Kyril and April FitzLyon.

== See also ==
- Bibliography of Leo Tolstoy
