= The Raid (Tolstoy story) =

1853 short story by Leo Tolstoy

"The Raid" (Russian: Набег, romanized: Nabeg) is a short story by Russian author Leo Tolstoy, first published in 1853. The story, set in the Caucasus, takes the form of a conversation between the narrator and a military captain about the nature of bravery. The story is based on Tolstoy's own experiences as an artillery cadet stationed in the Caucasus.

== See also ==
- Leo Tolstoy bibliography
