= The Inevitable Revolution =

1909 essay by Leo Tolstoy

- Author: Leo Tolstoy
- Original title: Неизбежный переворот
- Publication date: July 5, 1909

The Inevitable Revolution (Неизбежный переворот) is an essay written by Leo Tolstoy on July 5, 1909, about abolishing the law of violence and replacing it with the law of love. It is generally considered a text on civil disobedience, pacifism, and anarchism, and it is Tolstoy's last non-fiction work detailing his final opinions on political, economic, and religious issues.

== Content ==
In it, he criticizes prisons, parliaments, wars, conscription, capitalism, theft, revolutionary violence, and taxes, and praises Christianity's message of love as the solution to these problems, although he recognizes the law of love in other religions, as well. Tolstoy asked people not to directly commit any violence (as a soldier, etc.), not to take part in violence (working for the government, etc.), and not to approve of violence (in writing or speech, etc.).

== Within the literary academic community ==
It was translated from Russian to English in 1975 by Dr. Ronald Sampson, lecturer in Politics at the University of Bristol, England, and published by Housmans jointly with the Fellowship of Reconciliation. It was previously published in The New York Times on September 26, 1909. The original text of the essay is drawn from the Russian Jubilee edition of Tolstoy's Complete collected works. The essay is considered critical by academics E. I. Pats’orka and A. N. Koshechko in understanding Tolstoy's pedagogical ideas. The text is also considered critical by academic G. M. Hamburg in understanding historian Boris Eikhenbaum's incorrect assessment on Tolstoy's opinion of Vekhi, a collection of essays written by the Russian intelligentsia. The academic Alexandre J. M. E. Christoyannopoulos also considers this text when comparing the political influence of religion, notably terrorism, with the peaceful and love-based vision proposed by Tolstoy. In 2018, I.F. Salmanova compared Tolstoy's 1909 diary entries with The Inevitable Revolution to reveal Tolstoy's literary mechanism.
