= The Devil (novella) =

1911 novella by Leo Tolstoy

"The Devil" (Russian: Дьявол) is a novella by Leo Tolstoy. It was written in 1889, given an alternative ending in 1909, but published only posthumously in 1911. Like Tolstoy's The Kreutzer Sonata, written around the same time, "The Devil" deals with the consequences of sexual emotion.

== Plot summary ==
Two young men, Eugene Irtenev and his brother, are left a large inheritance after the death of their father. However, the inheritance is saddled with debts, and the brothers must decide whether or not to accept it. Eugene accepts the inheritance and buys off his brother's portion, thinking that he can sell off large tracts of land while making improvements to the rest. Living alone with his mother while working on the farm, Eugene misses the relations he had with women while living in St. Petersburg. He inquires around the village, and the watchman introduces Eugene to a local peasant named Stepanida whose husband lives away in the city. For several months Eugene and Stepanida have encounters, with Eugene paying her each time. Eventually, Eugene's mother thinks it is time for him to get married, preferably to an heiress who will help them with their debts. To her disappointment, Eugene falls in love with Liza Annenskaya, a charming middle-class girl, and they are married after Eugene breaks off relations with Stepanida.

After a year of marriage, Liza employs two peasant women to help with cleaning the estate. One of them is Stepanida. When Eugene notices her, all the passion for her that he thought was forgotten comes rushing back. He can't stop thinking about her and decides that she must be sent away. Liza later suffers a harmful fall while pregnant, and Eugene takes her for a rest cure to Crimea for two months on doctor's orders. She gives birth to a daughter, and Eugene's financial prospects are starting to look promising. His estate is described as being in the best working condition it has ever been, and he thinks he is finally happy.

At a village festival, Eugene notices Stepanida dancing, and their glances re-awaken his desire. Tormented by lust, he thinks of resuming relations with her, but realizes that the affair would cause too much of a scandal. Eugene says of Stepanida, "Really, she is--a devil. Simply a devil. She has possessed herself of me against my own will." He convinces himself that there are only two options: to kill Stepanida, or to kill his wife and run off with Stepanida. Eugene then thinks of a third option, which is to commit suicide. When his family finds him dead of a revolver shot, they cannot understand why he killed himself since, although he was evidently tormented, he did not confide in his closest relatives.

== See also ==
- Leo Tolstoy bibliography
