= Nathan Haskell Dole =

American editor and translator (1852–1935)

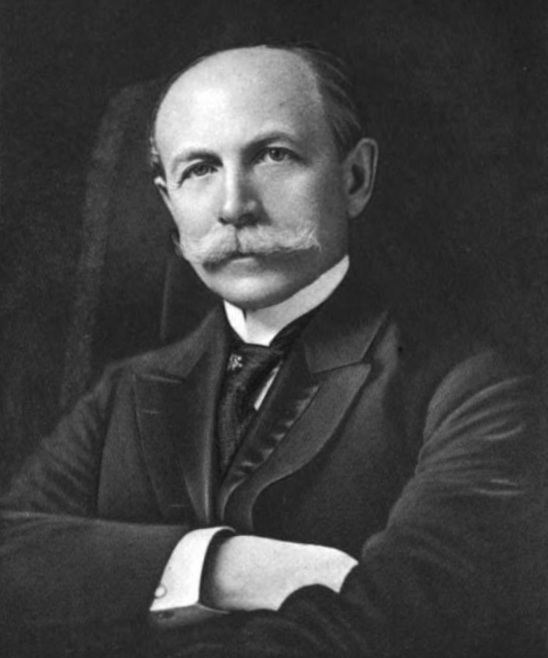
- Born: August 31, 1852; Chelsea, Massachusetts, US
- Died: May 9, 1935 (aged 82); Yonkers, New York, US
- Education: Harvard University
- Occupations: Editor; translator; writer
- Spouse: Helen James Bennett (m. 1882)

Nathan Haskell Dole (August 31, 1852 – May 9, 1935) was an American editor, translator, and author. A writer and journalist in Philadelphia, New York, and Boston, he translated many of the works of Leo Tolstoy and books of other Russians; novels of the Spaniard Armando Palacio Valdés (1886–90); a variety of works from the French and Italian.

== Biography ==
Nathan Haskell Dole was born August 31, 1852, in Chelsea, Massachusetts. He was the second son of the Reverend Nathan Dole (1811–1855) and mother Caroline (Fletcher) Dole, his older brother being Charles Fletcher Dole (1845–1927). After their father died of tuberculosis, their mother moved with the two boys to live with their grandmother in the Fletcher homestead, a strict Puritan home, in Norridgewock, Maine, where Dole grew up.

Sophie May wrote her Prudy Books in Norridgewock, and they may be an indication of the sort of life Nathan Dole and his brother lived there. A newspaper article about Nathan in the Boston Evening Transcript, February 8, 1929, suggested that Nathan, lively from the start, may have offered good material for the mischievous boys who acted as foil for the goody-good ones in the Prudy Books. The same Boston Evening Transcript article said that Nathan was an omnivorous reader, who soon taught himself to read in French, German, Greek and Latin. He studied at the Eaton School in Norridgewock, and then under private tutors. Later he went to the Phillips Exeter Academy and Phillips Andover Academy, graduating in 1870, and then to Harvard, from which he graduated in 1874. Years later he received an L.H. Doctorate and from Oglethorp University in Atlanta, Georgia, which made him an Honorary Alumnus.

After Harvard, Dole taught at De Veaux College from 1874 to 1875, and at Worcester High School from 1875 to 1876. From 1876 to 1878, he was preceptor at Derby Academy, in Hingham, Massachusetts. In 1881, he left his teaching career to work for the Philadelphia Press, where he was musical art and literary editor. (For a time his work appeared in both the morning and evening edition of the Press, affording him the opportunity of contradicting in the evening paper what he had said in the morning edition, and vice versa. From 1887 to 1901 he was literary advisor to T. Y. Crowell Publishing Company. He was also Secretary of the department of publicity at D. Appleton and Co. for five months in 1901.

On June 28, 1882, in Boston, Dole married Helen James Bennett, a daughter of Frances and William M. Bennett, of Boston. They were married by his brother Charles F. Dole, and Dole stated his occupation as Editor. He was aged 29 and his wife 25. They settled in Boston, where he concentrated on writing, translating, editing, and lecturing. Dole and his family lived in Jamaica Plain for many years, spending their summers in Ogunquit, Maine. They were popular members of the Boston social and literary set. Their home was full of both music and literature, and was well known for good conversation at the four o'clock teas every afternoon.

In 1928, when he was seventy-six, Dole and his wife moved to New York City to be near their daughter and grandchildren and lived in Riverdale-on-Hudson.

Dole knew the literary giants Ralph Waldo Emerson, Henry Wadsworth Longfellow (who was his father's instructor in Bowdoin College), Oliver Wendell Holmes Sr., William Cullen Bryant, James Russell Lowell, Charles Anderson Dana, Walt Whitman, William Dean Howells, John Greenleaf Whittier, Thomas Wentworth Higginson, Edward Everett Hale, Julia Ward Howe, Louise Chandler Moulton, Byrd Spilman Dewey and many others.

Dole died May 9, 1935, at St. John's Hospital in Yonkers, New York of a heart attack.

== Works ==
Among his original writings are:

- Young Folks History of Russia (1881)
- A Score of Famous Composers (1891; 1902; 1924) (Enlarged and revised in 1927)
- A Vital Question, Or, What is to be Done? (1886)
- Not Angela Quite (fiction) (1893)
- On the Point (fiction) (1893)
- The Hawthorn Tree and other Poems (1895)
- Joseph Jefferson At Home (1896)
- Poem for the Educational Music Courses (1896)
- The Hawthorn Tree and Other Poems (1896)
- Life of Francis William Bird (1897)
- Omar the Tentmaker, A Romance of Old Persia (1898; 1921; 1928)
- Joseph Jefferson at Home (1898); see Joseph Jefferson.
- The Mistakes We Make (1898)
- Peace and Progress (1904)
- The Latin Poets (1905)
- The Breviary Treasures (10 Volumes) (1905; 1906)
- The Greek Poets (1907)
- Six Italian Essays (1907)
- The Pilgrims and other Poems (1907)
- Our Northern Domain - Alaska - Picturesque, Historic and Commercial (1910)
- Life of Count Tolstoi (1911)
- The Spell of Switzerland (1913)
- Rote Songs for Boston Public Schools (1915; 1916)
- America in Spitsbergen (Two Volumes) (1922)

He contributed to:

- Boston Evening Transcript
- The Portland News
- The Independent
- The New York Times Literary Supplement
- Many other magazines.

Dole was Associate Editor of:

- The Internal Library of Famous Literature (1890)
- Flowers from Persia Poets (1901)
- The Young Folks Library (1902)
- The Encyclopedia Americana (1905)
- Vocations (1909–1910) (10 Volumes; in collaboration with Pres. Hyde and Caroline Ticknor)
- The 10th Edition of Bartlett's Familiar Quotation, with additions. Poems of Dr. Samuel S. Curry, with Biography (1923)

His editorial works include:

- Omar Khayyám (1896)
- Tolstoi's Collected Works (1899) (20 Volumes)
- Poetical Works of Keats and Shelley (1905)

His translations include:

- Count Lyof N. Tolstoi: "War and Peace" (New York, Thomas Y. Crowell & Co. 1889)
- B. Schulze-Smidt: A Madonna of the Alps (Boston: Little, Brown and Company, 1895)
- Paolo Ettore Santangelo: Attila, A Romance of Old Aquileia (New York: Thomas Y. Crowell Company, 1929)
