= Aylmer and Louise Maude =

English translators (1858–1938) & (1855–1939)

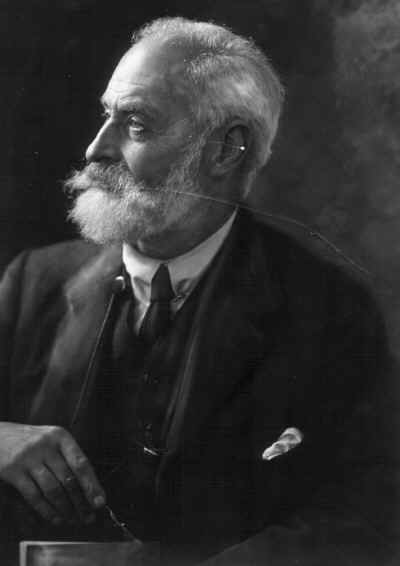
Aylmer Maude, photographed on 21 October 1919

Aylmer Maude (28 March 1858 – 25 August 1938) and Louise Maude (née Shanks; 1855–1939) were English translators of Leo Tolstoy's works, and Aylmer Maude also wrote his friend Tolstoy's biography, The Life of Tolstoy. After living many years in Russia, the Maudes spent the rest of their lives in England translating Tolstoy's writing and promoting public interest in his work. Aylmer Maude was also involved in a number of early 20th century progressive causes.

== Family and Russia ==
Aylmer Maude was born in Ipswich, the son of a Church of England clergyman, Reverend F.H. Maude, and his wife Lucy, who came from a Quaker background. The family lived near the newly built Holy Trinity Church where Rev. Maude's preaching helped draw a large congregation. A few of the vicar's earlier sermons were published with stirring titles like Nineveh: A Warning to England!, but later he moved from Evangelical Anglicanism towards the Anglo-Catholic Church Union.

After boarding at Christ's Hospital from 1868 to 1874, Aylmer went to study at the Moscow Lyceum from 1874 to 1876, and was a tutor there between 1877 and 1880. Meanwhile, he got to know the thriving British community in Moscow, was involved in their amateur dramatics and debating, and played a great deal of chess. One of his chess partners, Archibald Mirrielees, employed him to manage the carpet department at the Scots-owned department store, Muir & Mirrielees. This led to Maude's becoming business manager and then director of the Anglo-Russian Carpet Company. Despite this position he "rejected the business ethos" of his British compatriots, took a thoughtful interest in Russian society, and has been described as the only "important intermediary between the two cultures" at that time.

Louise Maude was born Louise Shanks in Moscow, one of the eight children of James Steuart Shanks, who was the founder and director of Shanks & Bolin, Magasin Anglais (English store). Two of Louise's sisters were artists: Mary knew Tolstoy and prepared illustrations for Where Love is, God is, and Emily was a painter and the first woman to become a full member of the Peredvizhniki. Louise married Aylmer Maude in 1884 in an Anglican ceremony at the British vice-consulate in Moscow, and they had five sons, one of them still-born.

Aylmer Maude met Tolstoy in 1888, introduced to him by Peter Alekseyev, a doctor married to Maude's sister Lucy. Maude was a frequent visitor, an admirer and friend, playing tennis and chess, enjoying long discussions, but not always agreeing with the great writer 30 years his senior. Tolstoy made return visits, getting to know Louise and the family, even showing the boys how to make "paper cockerels". After the Maudes settled in England, Tolstoy and Aylmer Maude kept up a regular correspondence, with Maude making occasional trips to Russia to see Tolstoy at his Yasnaya Polyana estate. During his 1902 visit Tolstoy authorized Maude to write his biography.

== From 1897: England and travel ==
Many of the British business people in late 19th century Russia prospered and were able to plan for early retirement; Aylmer Maude gave up his trading career before he reached 40. He, Louise, and family arrived in England in 1897 ready to live a different kind of life. At first the family stayed a short time in Croydon with the Brotherhood Church, a Tolstoyan group believing in co-operative ideals and non-violence. Their next home was in Essex at Wickham's Farm in Bicknacre, associated with the adjacent Brotherhood Church commune at Cock Clarks, Purleigh which they helped establish and to which they gave financial support until it came to an end in 1899. At least two of their sons went to the Friends (Quaker) school at Saffron Walden.

In 1898 Maude sailed from Liverpool to Quebec with representatives of the Doukhobors, a group supported by Tolstoy, who were persecuted in Russia for their beliefs and wanted to resettle in Canada. He confessed to the "un-Tolstoyan self-indulgence" of arranging a first-class cabin for himself. Maude wrote about this journey and the Doukhobors in Peculiar People (1904).

The Maudes soon moved to Great Baddow near Chelmsford where they were members of the Fabian Society and co-operative movement. Aylmer was on the Fabian national executive from 1907 to 1912, lectured for the society, and wrote one of their pamphlets in association with George Bernard Shaw. His lecturing talents included a "pleasing smile, manly and unruffled demeanour" and a "beautiful voice" according to the writer William Loftus Hare, who also described him as a "lucid, confident, instructive, persuasive" speaker.

Some years after leaving Wickham's Farm, Maude would express doubts about communal living, feeling it could only succeed with a strong leader or shared traditions, and he called the Purleigh commune a "queer colony". "The really sad part of the Tolstoy movement was the terrible amount of quarrelling. . . ."

While Aylmer Maude did not stick rigidly to a Tolstoyan set of ideas, and was associated with a variety of causes and campaigns, he never wavered in his admiration of Tolstoy, even when he held different views: ". . .though Tolstoy is sincere and wise, he, like all mortals, makes mistakes. . . ."

In 1913 Maude was in Hampstead lodging in the household of Marie Stopes and her first husband. There was probably a "flirtatious friendship" between Stopes and Maude, but there is no hint of this in Maude's books, The Authorised Life of Marie C. Stopes (1924) or Marie Stopes: her work and play (1933). Stopes' campaign to make contraception freely available to married women was another cause supported by Maude.

Maude travelled to Archangel (now Arkhangelsk) in Russia with the British North Russian Expeditionary Force in 1918, acting as interpreter and liaison officer, and lecturing while there for the Universities' Committee of the YMCA to both Russian- and English-speakers, to both civilian and military audiences. The 60-year-old lecturer found himself under fire from "Bolsheviki", but was more interested in ideas than fighting. Later he suggested that "world statesmen" faced with the Russian revolution had "missed an opportunity to make the world 'safe for democracy.'"

During their later years, the Maudes were occupied with preparing a comprehensive edition of Tolstoy's works. Their private resources were dwindling, but Aylmer Maude was granted a Civil List pension for services to literature in 1932. His death in 1938, aged 80, brought newspaper headlines describing him as "Authority on Tolstoy" and "Friend of Tolstoy". Louise died the following year.

== Literary activities ==
To a large extent, it was Louise who worked on Tolstoy's fiction, and Aylmer who tackled his philosophical writing. The "retired carpet manufacturer" brought out a translation of What Is Art? in 1899, while Louise's translation of Resurrection was published in 1900 by the Brotherhood Publishing Company. Throughout the 1900s, they also translated The Power of Darkness, The First Distiller, Fruits of Culture, and many of Tolstoy's short stories and other writings. Some of their work was published by the OUP World Classics Series, but they also used the smaller firm of Grant Richards, and Constable published some of their works, including Aylmer Maude's two-volume The Life of Tolstoy biography in 1908 and 1910.

Aylmer Maude handled most of the practical affairs related to publication, corresponding often with George Herbert Perris and Charles F. Cazenove at the Literary Agency in London to discuss publishers, funding and other business. His prolific correspondence included not only letters to friends, and lobbying letters for causes he supported, but also letters to correct details in newspaper reviews: the Maudes disapproved of the "French" spelling Tolstoi, for instance.

Maude wanted to publish a complete collected works of Tolstoy and enlisted his friends and acquaintances to help campaign for funding and support. There were many competing editions of the more popular works, some of them "very incompetent", according to Bernard Shaw, since Tolstoy had waived his rights over translation. Shaw wrote to The Times asking readers to support the project by "spontaneously giving it the privileges of a copyright edition" and "subscribing for complete sets" to make up for the "miscarriage of Tolstoy's public-spirited intentions." Shaw's signature was followed by many more, including literary figures like Arnold Bennett, Arthur Conan Doyle, Gilbert Murray and H. G. Wells. Thomas Hardy added his own independent letter, offering support though he did not feel equipped to comment on all the points in the main letter.

After a protesting letter from an admirer of Constance Garnett's translations, the correspondence continued, with Maude asserting that "Tolstoy authorized my wife's translation" of Resurrection and Shaw insisting on the need for a complete collected works, going beyond the "great novels" which were "sure to get themselves translated everywhere," since other translators had "picked the plums out of the pudding." He went on to compare Maude's "devoted relation" to Tolstoy with that of Henrik Ibsen's translator William Archer, or Richard Wagner's Ashton Ellis.

The Maudes achieved their aim with the publication of the Tolstoy Centenary Edition: The Works of Leo Tolstoy in 21 volumes by Oxford University Press between 1928 and 1937, featuring their translations. The complete collection was made available for "9 guineas the set". Both husband and wife lived to see the final volume published, with Aylmer dying a year afterwards. Their work was thought to be of high quality in their lifetime, and is still well respected today. Their highest praise came from Tolstoy, who commented that "Better translators, both for knowledge of the two languages and for penetration into the very meaning of the matter translated, could not be invented." Tolstoy consistently lauded the Maudes' work, and also sometimes helped them: for their translation of Sevastopol and Other Military Tales, Tolstoy provided them with "information and explanations which we needed for the preparation of the present volume" and told them that "The publication of your translations of my writings can only be a pleasure to me."

== Bibliography ==
=== Works by Aylmer ===
- Tolstoy and His Problems (1901) - "Right and Wrong", one of the essays from this book, was separately published as a pamphlet in 1902; 2nd edition. Funk & Wagnalls. 1904. ISBN 9780598836373.
- Leo Tolstoy: A Short Biography (1902) - originally published in 1900 as a pamphlet called The Teaching of Tolstoy; published in 1901 as part of Tolstoy and His Problems
- A Peculiar People: The Doukhobórs (1904)
- The Life of Tolstoy - two volumes: volume one was published in 1908 and subtitled First Fifty Years; volume two was published in 1910 and subtitled The Later Years. Both volumes were revised in 1930. vol. 1 (1911 ed.), vol. 2 (1911 ed.)
- War and Peace, by Leo Tolstoy, translation of (1922–23), with his wife, Louise, Oxford University Press
- The Authorized Life of Marie C. Stopes (1924)
- Tolstoy on Art (1924)
- Tolstoy on Art and Its Critics (1925)
- Leo Tolstoy and His Works (1930)

== See also ==
- Whiteway Colony – Aylmer Maude was the head of the founding board of directors

== Sources ==
- Fred Burningham, Holy Trinity Church – a Brief History (1985)
- Harvey L Dyck (ed), The Pacifist Impulse in Historical Perspective (1996)
- Harvey J Pitcher, The Smiths of Moscow (1984)
- Oxford Dictionary of National Biography
- The Times
- Birth and marriage records and English censuses
- British Library catalogue
- Leeds University, Special Collections Catalogue
