= Isabel Florence Hapgood =

American writer and translator (1850–1928)

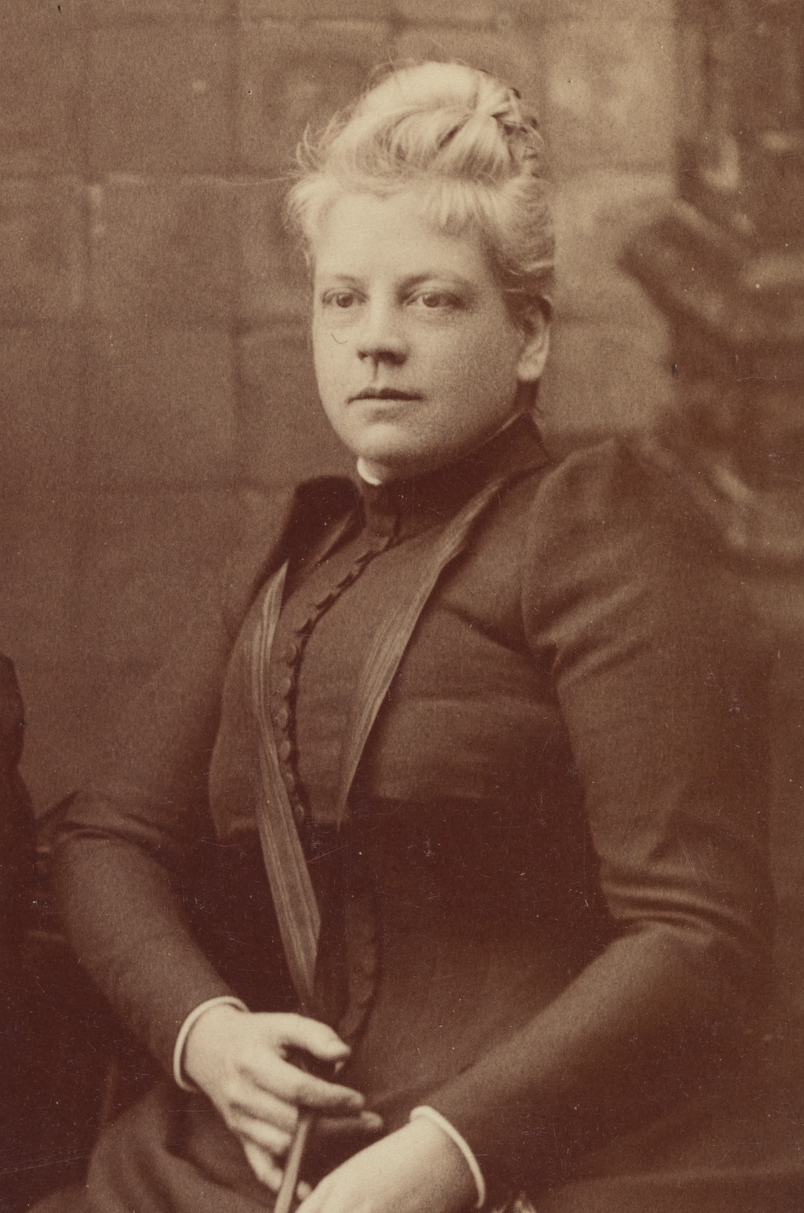
- Isabel F. Hapgood in 1890
- Born: November 21, 1850; Boston, Massachusetts, U.S.
- Died: June 26, 1928 (aged 76); New York City, U.S.
- Occupations: Writer; translator

Isabel Florence Hapgood (November 21, 1850 – June 26, 1928) was an American writer and translator, who is renowned for her translations of Russian and French texts. She is best known for her English translations of Victor Hugo's Les Misérables (1887) and The Hunchback of Notre-Dame (1888), which she published as Notre-Dame de Paris.

Furthermore, she is known for her translation of Leo Tolstoy's Childhood, Boyhood, Youth (1886) as well as Fyodor Dostoevsky's The Brothers Karamazov (1905). However, her edition of The Brothers Karamazov was overshadowed by fellow writer and translator Constance Garnett, who translated over 70 volumes of Russian literature. Nevertheless, both Hapgood and Garnett played a key role in translating Russian literature.

== Early life ==
Hapgood was born in Boston, to Asa Hapgood and Lydia Anna Bronson Crossley, with her twin brother Asa. Their parents later had another son, William Frank Hapgood (who became a patent lawyer). Asa Hapgood was an inventor, and his family of English and Scottish descent had lived near Worcester, Massachusetts since the 17th century. Her mother's father had emigrated from England and owned a farm in Mason County, Kentucky.

== Career ==
Hapgood became a major translator of French and Russian literature, as well as a key figure in the dialogue between Western Christianity and Eastern Orthodoxy. She helped Harvard professor Francis James Child with his Book of Ballads which began publication in 1882. In 1885, Hapgood published her own Epic Songs of Russia, for which Child supplied a preface, and which received several good reviews. The next year Hapgood published translations of Leo Tolstoy’s Childhood, Boyhood, Youth and Nikolai Gogol’s Taras Bulba and Dead Souls. In 1887, her translations of the major works of Victor Hugo began publication, introducing that major French author to American audiences.

Hapgood dreamed of traveling to Russia, and so engaged a Russian lady to help her attain fluency in the spoken language. Between 1887 and 1889, she and her widowed mother traveled through Russia. While there, Hapgood met several significant Russian literary and clerical figures. After that trip, Hapgood began traveling about annually to Russia. On that long first trip, Hapgood spent several weeks with the famous Russian novelist Leo Tolstoy on his country estate, and continued publishing translations of his works. In 1891, The Atlantic magazine published a lengthy article by Hapgood detailing her observations of Tolstoy as a man trying to live his ideal life.

For 22 years, Hapgood wrote for the New York Evening Post and The Nation, as a journalist, foreign correspondent and editorial writer. In 1893, Hapgood reviewed a book by Kate Marsden which described her journey across Russia to find a cure for leprosy. She picked the book to pieces and cast Marsden as "an adventuress" who was only trying to help "her lepers". The Royal Geographical Society lauded Marsden, but Hapgood discounted her efforts. Hapgood wrote to everyone from Queen Victoria down warning them about Kate Marsden. One scholar later speculated that Hapgood was jealous of Marsden writing about "her" country or because of homophobic rumours about Marsden.

Many of the writers Hapgood translated were people of strong religious convictions. Hapgood herself was a lifelong and devout Episcopalian.

Particularly impressed by the Russian Orthodox liturgy and choral singing, Hapgood wanted to translate them for American audiences. Tikhon, then Archbishop of Alaska and the Aleutian Islands, supported her efforts and became her friend. Hapgood helped organize the choir for his consecration of St. Nicholas Cathedral in New York City in 1903. Tikhon's successor after his return to Russia and promotion, Archbishop Nicholas, gave Hapgood a complete set of Church Slavonic texts. The first edition of her translation appeared in 1906. In 1916–1917, Hapgood was visiting Tikhon, who had become Patriarch of Moscow, and editing a second edition of the work during her trip to Moscow when the Russian Revolution broke out. She became one of the first to report on the execution of the Romanov family. Hapgood escaped with the assistance of the American Consul and returned to the United States. Because Patriarch Tikhon was under house arrest, the second edition was not published until 1922 (by the Young Men's Christian Association), but it did contain Tikhon's endorsement dated November 3, 1921. The book received favorable reviews by Orthodox and Anglican reviewers; several editions were also published by other Orthodox denominations, including the Antiochian Orthodox, after her death.

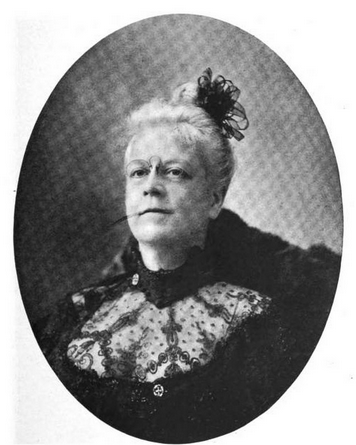
Isabel F. Hapgood, from a 1906 publication

Hapgood continued to admire Eastern Orthodox church music and helped Eastern Orthodox choirs in the United States, including performances at the Cathedral of St. John the Divine in New York City and before President Woodrow Wilson at the White House. She also compiled a history of Russian Orthodox music, but the manuscript was never published and was lost.

Despite Count Tolstoy's admonition that she should marry, Hapgood never married (nor did either of her brothers), and had no children.

== Death and legacy ==
Isabel Hapgood died in New York City on June 26, 1928, and her remains were taken to and buried in the familial plot in the Worcester Rural Cemetery. The liturgical calendar of the Episcopal Church (USA) remembers the distinguished translator and ecumenist annually with a commemoration on June 26.

Her papers are in the Manuscript collection of the New York Public Library.

== Own works ==
- The Epic Songs of Russia (1886) (new edition with an introduction by Prof J.W. Mackail, 1915))
- Count Tolstoi and the Public Censor, 1887
- Notable Women: Sonya Kovalevsky, as it appeared in Century Magazine (1895).
- Russian Rambles (1895)
- A Survey of Russian Literature (1902)
- Little Russian and St. Petersburg Tales (Date Unknown)
- The Death and Funeral of St. Raphael, New York Tribune, March 8, 1915

== Translations ==
"Orloff and His Wife"

- Childhood, Boyhood, Youth (1886), and Sevastopol (1888) by Leo Tolstoy
- Les Misérables (1887), Notre-Dame de Paris (1888), and Toilers of the Sea (1888) by Victor Hugo
- The Kreutzer Sonata (1890) and The Gospel in Brief (1896) by Leo Tolstoy
- On Labor and Luxury, On the Significance of Science and Art, Article on the Census in Moscow, Thoughts Evoked by the Census of Moscow and What to Do? by Leo Tolstoy
- Dead Souls, "Old-Fashioned Farmers", St. John's Eve, Taras Bulba, "The Cloak", "The Portrait", and "The Tale of How Ivan Ivanovitch Quarrelled with Ivan Nikiforovitch" by Nikolai Gogol
- Recollections and Letters (1892) by Ernest Renan
- Heart (1895) by Edmondo De Amicis
- The Revolution of France Under the Third Republic (1897) by Pierre de Coubertin
- Foma Gordyeef (1901) and "Orloff and His Wife" by Maxim Gorky (1901)
- The Diary of a Superfluous Man and Other Stories, A Reckless Character, and Other Stories and A Nobleman's Nest by Ivan Turgenev (1903)
- The Brothers Karamazov by Fyodor Dostoevsky (1905)
- The Seagull by Anton Chekhov (1905)
- Service Book of the Holy Orthodox-Catholic (Greco-Russian) Church (1906) (republished 1922)
- The Steel Flea (1916) by Nikolai Leskov
- The Village by Ivan Bunin (1923)
- The Cathedral Folk by Nikolai Leskov (1924)
