= Künstlerroman =

Literary genre

A Künstlerroman (German pronunciation: [ˈkʏnstlɐ.ʁoˌmaːn]; plural -ane), meaning "artist's novel" in English, is a narrative about an artist's growth to maturity. It could be classified as a sub-category of Bildungsroman: a coming-of-age novel. At its most basic, the Künstlerroman can be said to offer an account of "the protagonist's development into an artist," charting the course of an artist's early awakening to them fully realizing their potential. The Künstlerroman focuses on the artistic person specifically, meaning its protagonists must not only achieve the individual and social growth demanded of regular Bildung plots, but also arrive at a complete understanding of themselves as artists. According to Encyclopaedia Britannica, one way a Künstlerroman may differ from a Bildungsroman is its ending, where a Künstlerroman hero rejects the everyday life, but a Bildungsroman hero settles for being an ordinary citizen. According to Oxford Reference, the difference may lie in a longer view across the Künstlerroman hero's whole life, not just their childhood years.

== Related genres ==
The Künstlerroman is most closely related to the Bildungsroman, of which it is generally considered a subgenre. Both trace a protagonist's development, but where the Bildungsroman leads its hero toward civic life and social integration, the Künstlerroman follows an artist toward a creative vocation. Related forms include the Bildungsfilm, a cinematic equivalent; the postmodernist short story collections like John Barth's Lost in the Funhouse and the comics Künstlerroman, which extends the genre's conventions into graphic narrative.

== Historical origins ==
Rooted in a rebellion against the Enlightenment era, eighteenth century Germanic Romantic authors gave rise to what became the foundation of the Künstlerroman genre. These writers were drawn to the appeal of artistic expression in Romanticism and its most prominent author was Johann Wolfgang von Goethe. Goethe's Bildung philosophy was meant to establish "the full development of a person's possibilities," and from that foundation the Künstlerroman expanded to track the transformation of a protagonist from child to artist.

Looking outside Goethe, this period in European culture saw tremendous activity in the translation of ideas and theories, as writers began to cross borders with increasing frequency. The movement eventually spread to the English language in the nineteenth century, where it was embraced by leading novelists such as Charles Dickens. The style is considered to have reached its peak in English with Stephen Dedalus' personal progression into writerhood in James Joyce's A Portrait of the Artist as a Young Man (1916), generally considered the peak example of the genre in English. The genre is also considered an example of literary autobiography, as the writer of a Künstlerroman proves his or her mastery through the very text that tells his or her story.

== Defining characteristics ==
The Künstlerroman can be about any type of artist, including a writer, dancer, painter, or musician. Usually, the protagonist begins in a state of confinement, and through their strong will, they escape to another location. This location is known to be far away from their starting point, but coincidentally enough more hospitable to their future dreams and career. As the protagonist moves through the story, they encounter teachers that have opposite influences; there are mentors who foster growth while others work actively against it. In some cases, the protagonist reaches a standard of success, but only after experiencing a toll to either their moral or physical wellbeing.

Critic Maurice Beebe identified two competing modes in the genre: the "Ivory tower" artist, who withdraws from life to pursue great art, and "The Sacred Fount" artist, who sees lived experience as the very source of art. This tension drives many Künstlerromane, where the protagonist often mirrors the author working through their own conflicts as an artist.

== Examples by language ==
=== German ===
- Johann Wolfgang von Goethe's Wilhelm Meister's Apprenticeship (1795)
- Ludwig Tieck's Franz Sternbalds Wanderungen (1798)
- Novalis's Heinrich von Ofterdingen (1802)
- Eduard Mörike's Mozart on the way to Prague (1856)
- Thomas Mann's Tonio Kröger (1903) and Doctor Faustus (1947)
- Rainer Maria Rilke's The Notebooks of Malte Laurids Brigge (1910)
- Jakob Wassermann's Das Gänsemännchen (1915)
- Hermann Hesse's Demian (1919) and Klingsor's Last Summer (1920)

=== English ===
- 1805 William Wordsworth's The Prelude
- 1833–34 Thomas Carlyle's Sartor Resartus
- 1847 Charlotte Brontë's Jane Eyre
- 1848 Anne Brontë's The Tenant of Wildfell Hall
- 1850 Charles Dickens' David Copperfield
- 1852 Herman Melville's Pierre: or, The Ambiguities
- 1856 Elizabeth Barrett Browning's Aurora Leigh
- 1875 Henry James's Roderick Hudson
- 1890 Henry James's The Tragic Muse
- 1901 Miles Franklin's My Brilliant Career
- 1903 Samuel Butler's The Way of All Flesh
- 1908 Henry Handel Richardson's Maurice Guest
- 1909 Jack London's Martin Eden
- 1913 D. H. Lawrence's Sons and Lovers
- 1915 W. Somerset Maugham's Of Human Bondage
- 1915 Willa Cather's The Song of the Lark
- 1916 James Joyce's A Portrait of the Artist as a Young Man
- 1918 Wyndham Lewis's Tarr
- 1920 F. Scott Fitzgerald's This Side of Paradise
- 1928 Radclyffe Hall's The Well of Loneliness
- 1929 Thomas Wolfe's Look Homeward, Angel
- 1933 Malcolm Lowry's Ultramarine
- 1936 George Orwell's Keep the Aspidistra Flying
- 1939 John Fante's Ask the Dust
- 1943 Betty Smith's A Tree Grows in Brooklyn
- 1945 Richard Wright's Black Boy
- 1946 Philip Larkin's Jill
- 1947 W.O. Mitchell's Who Has Seen the Wind
- 1952 Patricia Highsmith's The Price of Salt
- 1955 William Gaddis's The Recognitions
- 1961 Irving Stone's The Agony and the Ecstasy
- 1963 Leonard Cohen's The Favourite Game
- 1970 Patrick White's The Vivisector
- 1971 Alice Munro's Lives of Girls and Women
- 1972 Chaim Potok's My Name Is Asher Lev
- 1973 Milan Kundera's Life Is Elsewhere
- 1974 Margaret Laurence's The Diviners
- 1978 John Irving's The World According to Garp
- 1981 Alasdair Gray's Lanark: A Life in Four Books
- 1982 Charles Bukowski's Ham on Rye
- 1983 Sandra Cisneros's The House on Mango Street
- 1985 Jeanette Winterson's Oranges Are Not the Only Fruit
- 1988 Margaret Atwood's Cat's Eye
- 1999 Tracy Chevalier's Girl with a Pearl Earring
- 2003 Jennifer Donnelly's A Northern Light
- 2006 Stew's Passing Strange
- 2010 Eileen Myles's Inferno (A Poet's Novel)
- 2010 Wena Poon's Alex y Robert
- 2011 Ben Lerner's Leaving the Atocha Station
- 2019 Ocean Vuong's On Earth We're Briefly Gorgeous
- 2020 Andrew Unger's Once Removed
- 2022 Gabrielle Zevin's Tomorrow, and Tomorrow, and Tomorrow

Notes

- A semiautobiographical narrative takes up two of the four books of Gray's Lanark.
- In John Dos Passos' U.S.A. trilogy, the Camera Eye sections add up to a modernist autobiographical Künstlerroman.
- John Barth's Lost in the Funhouse is a collection of short stories that are often read as a postmodernist Künstlerroman.

=== French ===
- 1831, 1837 Honoré de Balzac's The Unknown Masterpiece
- 1904–1905 Romain Rolland's Jean-Christophe
- 1913–1927 Marcel Proust's In Search of Lost Time

=== Italian ===
- Gabriele D'Annunzio's Il Piacere, Le Vergini Delle Rocce and Il Fuoco
- 1975 Gavino Ledda's My Father, My Master (Padre Padrone)
- 2012–2015 Elena Ferrante's Neapolitan Novels

=== Icelandic ===
- Halldór Laxness's The Fish Can Sing

=== Russian ===
- Vladimir Nabokov's The Gift
- Leo Tolstoy's trilogy of novellas Childhood, Boyhood, &Youth

=== Croatian ===
- 1932 Miroslav Krleža's The Return of Filip Latinovicz

=== Malayalam ===
- 1993 Perumbadavam Sreedharan's Oru Sankeerthanam Pole

=== Norwegian ===
- 2009–2011 Karl Ove Knausgaard's My Struggle (Knausgård novels)
- 1890 Knut Hamsun's Hunger (“Sult”)

=== Danish ===
- 1967-1971 Tove Ditlevsen's The Copenhagen Trilogy

=== Portuguese ===
- 1883 Maria Benedita Bormann's Lésbia
- 1976 Ferreira Gullar's Poema Sujo

=== Turkish ===
- 1896–1897 Halit Ziya Uşaklıgil's Blue and Black (Mavi ve Siyah)
- 1972 Oğuz Atay’s Tutunamayanlar
- 1959 Yusuf Atılgan’s Aylak adam

=== Bengali ===
- 1917-1933 Sarat Chandra Chattopadhyay's Srikanta
- 1999 Malay Roy Choudhury's Chhotoloker Chhotobela

== Critical interpretations ==
Scholars have examined the Künstlerroman through the lens of economics, arguing that the genre could not have emerged before modern capitalist markets. By the nineteenth century, no professional writer could claim independence from the market, a tension intensified by the rise of mass readership and cheap serial publishing in the 1830s and 1840s. This led authorship to become entangled with the metaphor of prostitution, as writers sold not a commodity but themselves. This economic framework has been applied to works like David Copperfield and Aurora Leigh, which explore how writers constructed their identities differently along gender lines.

Gender has also been a significant lens through which critics have approached the genre. Feminist scholars have examined the obstacles women face in establishing artistic careers and the ways female creativity can disrupt conventional narratives. Definitions of the genre have expanded considerably over time to include novels by women as readily as classic male-authored texts such as Wilhelm Meister's Apprenticeship. These may be called female artist's novels. However, there are still critiques about the genre's exclusivity. Susan Gubar argued in 1983 that the form remains stubbornly centered on male experiences, showcasing only male protagonists, and ignoring works by female authors.

== Modern adaptations ==
The Künstlerroman has continued to evolve in the twenty-first century. In young adult literature, scholars have examined how the female artist figure navigates the familiar pressures of creative identity and apprenticeship while also grappling with the rise of digital technology. Du argues that Web 2.0 has complicated the traditional arc from amateur to professional, blurring the boundaries of what it means to be a recognized author when online platforms give anyone a creative voice. Du further questions whether the genre can retain its distinctiveness as a separate form from the broader Bildungsroman.

The genre has also expanded into new forms. King argues that since the turn of the millennium, a distinct "comics Künstlerroman" has emerged in prose fiction. King points to Michael Chabon's The Amazing Adventures of Kavalier & Clay (2000) and Emily St. John Mandel's Station Eleven (2014) as prominent examples of this trend, arguing that their critical success reflects a growing willingness among literary scholars to recognize comics as a legitimate mode of artistic expression. The framework has also appeared in films such as American Splendor (2003).

== Global reception ==
Although the Künstlerroman began in Germany, it quickly spread across national literatures such as English, French, Italian, Russian, Norwegian, Turkish, Bengali, and Malayalam. Its core concerns of artistic formation, the struggle for creative identity, and the tension between art and society proved transferable across vastly different cultural contexts, with individual works reshaping it to local traditions. For example, the form has also been adapted by minority authors such as Junot Díaz and Umberto Eco. Critics have noted, however, that this global diffusion has not been uniform, as minority writers remain underrepresented both as practitioners of the form and as subjects of scholarship.
