= After the Ball (short story) =

- Short story by Leo Tolstoy
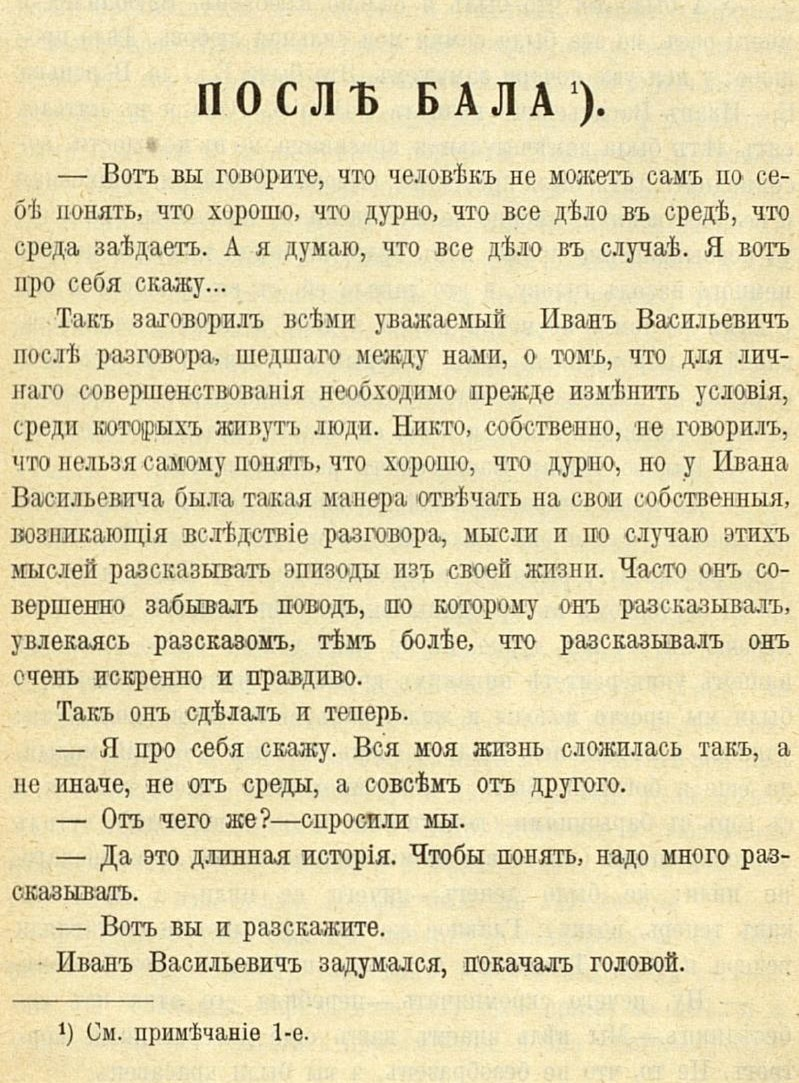
- Publication by Posrednik (1912)
- Original title: После бала
- Country: Russia
- Language: Russian

Publication
- Publication date: 1911

"After the Ball" (also known as "After the Dance"; Russian: После бала) is a short story by the Russian writer Leo Tolstoy, written in the year 1903 and published posthumously in 1911. The short story serves as an example of Tolstoy's commentary on high culture and social governance, as explored through one man's experience with love.

== Background and publication ==
"After the Ball" was originally entitled "Father and Daughter". Tolstoy then renamed it to "Oh You Say" before settling on "After the Ball".

There are semi-autobiographical events in the story. According to Tolstoy, "After the Ball" is based on a series of events that occurred surrounding Tolstoy's brother, Sergei. Sergei had fallen in love with a woman named Varvara (nicknamed "Varenka") Andreyevna Koreisha, who happened to be the daughter of Commander Andrei Petrovich Koreish. Upon one day witnessing the beating of a runaway soldier under the Commander's supervision, Sergei's love quickly faded, and he quickly gave up his intention to marry her.

In "After the Ball," Tolstoy reuses motifs from his earlier works, such as the gloves from Childhood and boots from Youth, both of which were works based on his own life. Furthermore, characters and scenes from "After the Ball" are similar to those in War and Peace, which was published in 1869 and explores the same issues of governance, love, loss, and betrayal. Specifically, the colonel is reminiscent of the character Nikolai Rostov (from War and Peace), and the ball in the short story evokes themes similar to those in the soirée at the beginning of the novel.

== Plot ==
Ivan Vasilievich is telling a story to his friends. The tale opens with Ivan Vasilievich pining after the beautiful Varenka B., daughter of Colonel B. Ivan recounts to his friends the events of the night, during which he danced with Varenka and witnessed the colonel dance with her. He notes how deeply he fell in love with Varenka and grew to admire her father during the course of the night.

Later that night after the ball, Ivan Vasilievich is unable to sleep due to his infatuation with Varenka, so he leaves his home to go on a walk. As he wanders the street towards Varenka's home, he witnesses the running of a gauntlet by a Tartar who has deserted the military. Colonel B. oversees the flogging of the Tatar. Upon recognizing the face of Varenka's father, Ivan Vasilievich feels sick. The colonel pretends as if he did not see Ivan. While Ivan does not think the deed evil, Ivan is confused by the soldiers' unwavering adherence to military rules and tries to understand the brutality that he witnessed. He is unable to understand, and his love for Varenka dissipates. Ultimately, Ivan Vasilievich eschews his planned course of life, ultimately refusing to marry or enter the civil or military services.

== Characters ==
- Ivan Vasilievich, the protagonist, is the narrator of the story. He relates to a group of his friends a strange occurrence regarding a ball that he attended earlier in his life.
- Colonel B. ultimately serves as the unwitting source of conflict; he is a manifestation of Russian militant rule.
- Varenka B. is a young noblewoman with whom Ivan Vasilievich falls in love during the course of the ball. She is the daughter of Colonel B.
- Anisimov is a minor character, an engineer, who is also romantically interested in Varenka B. Through the rules of the ball, Anisimov secures a Mazurka dance with Varenka.

== Symbolism ==
=== Gloves ===
The fetishistic fixation on the kid gloves throughout the story suggests their importance in character definition and symbolism. When Ivan Vasilievich first meets Varenka, she is wearing "white kid gloves that reached almost to her thin, sharp elbows". Along with the "little feather from her fan", she gives him a "whole glove" at the end of the ball, which Ivan regards with "one feeling of tender emotion". The glove here symbolizes both the purity of Varenka's spirit, the delicate refinement of high culture, and the depth of Ivan's love.

Later in the story, Ivan Vasilievich sees the colonel ordering the flogging of the Tartar. When a soldier does not whip the Tartar with enough force, the colonel beats the "frightened, puny, weak soldier on the face". In this scene, Ivan notes the colonel's "strong hand in its kid glove," and the glove transforms into a symbol of unyielding rule and human brutality. In the flogging scene, the earlier illusion of the glove symbolizing upper-class culture shatters and is replaced by the image of an almost animalistic military brutality.

=== Clothing ===
Ivan Vasilievich denounces claims of his lust for Varenka, instead claiming he sees her in "bronze clothing". This point is in stark visual opposition to the bare and bloodied body of the Tartar deserter. Clothing becomes a symbol of a civilized state; ironically, it is the Tartar's lack of clothing that reveals the uncivilized, unbridled aggression of the supposedly civilized soldiers.

=== Rules ===
Tolstoy was concerned with rules and social governance, both in his personal life and in his writing. Through the ball, Tolstoy illustrates a highly regulated and cultural phenomenon, an event in which a strict adherence to rules is required to secure one's place. For example, Ivan Vasilievich is unable to dance the mazurka due to his absence during the procedures determining the dance. The ball is simultaneously an "occasion of grace and elegance and a symbol of consummate artificiality." Furthermore, Tolstoy's fixation on dress, through the kid gloves of the colonel and Varenka and the calfskin boots of the colonel, serves to reinforce the importance of propriety and appearance during both the dance and within Russian society at the time.

=== Lent ===
Tolstoy specifies that the story occurs right at the start of Lent. As a Christian holiday, Lent evokes the image of Christ, which is seen in the image of the battered deserter. The act of flogging itself is reminiscent of the crucifixion of Christ, as both of his arms are tied to sticks held by two soldiers as he is forcibly led through the Gauntlet. Appropriately, the Tartar begs for mercy multiple times, and the blacksmith says "Oh Lord" upon seeing the mangled body. Additionally, Ivan Vasilievich hears the gaunt-runner continually repeat "have mercy, brothers," which draws upon Christian myths and rituals. The unclothed Tartar is garbed in a Christian mythos that contrasts against the Greco-Roman idealism that surrounds the bronze-attired Varenka.

=== Music ===
Tolstoy incorporates music throughout the story, and the musical choices highlight the contrast between the ball and the flogging. At the ball, the dancing of the mazurka "by the rules" occupies Ivan Vasilievich's mind as the ball proceeds, and he ultimately fails in his goal of dancing this one particular piece with her, even though he enjoys almost all of the other music of the night at her side. Even at the end of the ball, he remains in an elated state and pays almost no attention to the musicians as they become tired and play with a "sort of weary despair". Ivan Vasilievich recalls that the music of the ball caused a "singing in [his] soul", in stark contrast to his later memory of the military drummer and fifer creating "harsh, bad music" at the Gauntlet.

== Themes ==
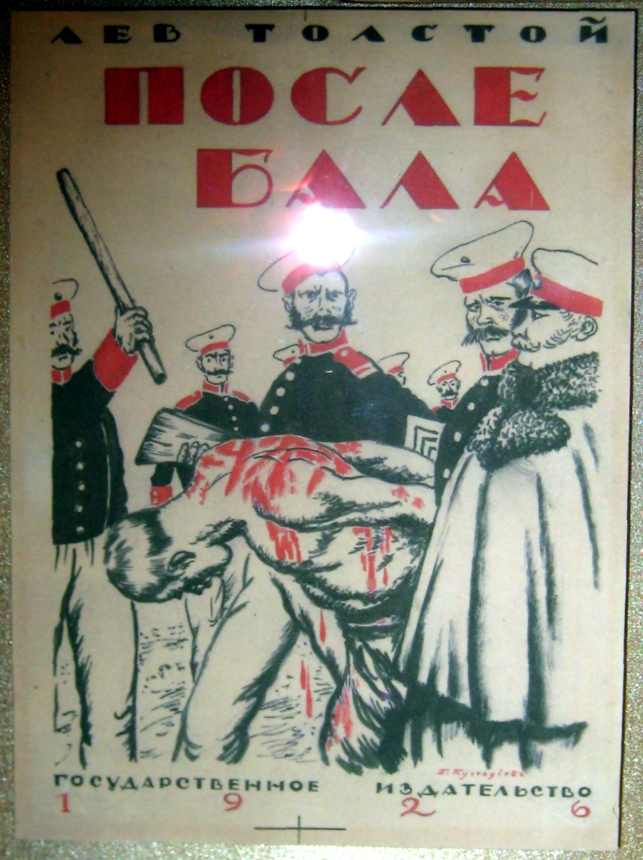
1926 edition with cover by Boris Kustodiev

=== Good and evil ===
The story begins with Ivan Vasilievich's statement that "man cannot understand what’s good and what’s bad on his own, that it’s all a matter of the environment, that he’s a prey to the environment". Tolstoy suggests that good and bad can reside in one person; this theme becomes the core of the story, as Ivan sees the "very handsome, stately, tall, and fresh old man" that he meets at the ball transform into "a tall officer in a greatcoat and a peaked cap" who mercilessly flogs the Tartar. Ivan Vasilievich becomes physically ill by the scene, but does not dismiss it as evil given everyone else's acceptance of the situation. Ivan Vasilievich thinks that the colonel must know something that he doesn't, but is unable to discover for himself the secret.

=== Culture and nature ===
Tolstoy emphasizes the opposition of culture and nature within "After the Ball," notably through the juxtaposition of urban and rural in the two parts of the story. The ball takes place indoors, and the flogging takes place outdoors: "It was perfect pre-Lenten weather, there was a mist, the waterlogged snow melted on the roads, and all the roofs were dripping." The colonel is the most obvious example of this opposition. During the ball, he is a model of social grace and standing. During the flogging, he presides over the other soldiers in a ruthless manner. Ivan Vasilievich is shocked by the two sides to the colonel. Through this scene, Tolstoy questions the natural state of man.

In addition, the presence of rules as a form of symbolic cultural clothing is worth noting as yet one more way in which society hides itself. The presence of this high culture is simultaneously complementary and in contrast against nature; Ivan Vasilievich's loss of love for Varenka is indicative of the nature/culture dichotomy. Ultimately, his decision to remain outside of the civil and military service demonstrates his lack of desire to accept the impositions of the "cultured" world.

=== State terror ===
The gauntlet is considered a manifestation of "state terror". Its use relies on many factors making everyone involved complicit in the act, even to the extent that those watching (i.e. Ivan Vasilievich) are tainted by the act. Tolstoy was vocal about his opinions on government rules, stating, "It's much more natural to imagine a society governed by reasonable, beneficial and universally acknowledged rules than a society in which today's people live, obeying state laws passed by no one knows whom," and explores these themes in "After the Ball." The short story demonstrates the potential for government power to be used against its people and offers a contrast against the familial love and social euphoria witnessed in the first part of "After the Ball."

=== Expectations of society ===
The rule of law and the expectations of society are themes common to Tolstoy's works. In "After the Ball," these social hierarchies are frequently connected to the wearing of gloves. The rules of proper conduct are repeatedly stated and emphasized in the story, both during and after the ball. The characters’ gloves always serve as part of their uniform and act as a symbol of their upper social status. The gloves also serve to drive the plot. For example, Ivan Vasilievich does not dance the proper mazurka with Varenka because he was delayed in putting on his gloves, and later he must guess what "quality," or emblem, she is wearing. Varenka's father, when asked to dance, also takes time to put on his glove and even states "everything according to the rules." Later, when the Colonel himself beats one of his own soldiers, the narrator emphasizes how this is done mercilessly: "With his strong hand in its kid glove, he beat the frightened, puny, weak soldier."

== Style ==
=== Framing narrative ===
Tolstoy uses a framing narrative in "After the Ball," as within Tolstoy's story Ivan recalls the story to his friends later in life. Because of this, the reader only hears of the series of events from the point of view of Ivan Vasilievich, and his own thought processes serve as a framework to manifest the blurred line between right and wrong. The story is also framed as a bildungsroman, as Ivan Vasilievich describes how he went from a "very pert and merry lad, and rich besides," to one whose "whole life was changed" after being witness to the capability of human brutality.

=== Defamiliarization ===
As the title suggestions, the short story may be considered in two parts – the ball and the flogging. Tolstoy uses defamiliarization in each part to emphasize the importance of the ritual and social norms. During the ball, Varenka dances with her father as Ivan watches. He is struck by the "tapping of soles and of foot against foot," noting the juxtaposition between Varenka's small white satin shoes and her father's large military boots. Ivan remains fixated on the colonel's dancing, which is deconstructed into its component parts – the heavy legs and the square-toed calfskin boots. The scene suggests an awareness of the tight movements responsible for the effortless scene before the audience. During the flogging, Ivan Vasilievich catches "a glimpse of the punished man’s back between the rows. It was something so mottled, wet, red, unnatural, that [he] could not believe it was a man’s body." Tolstoy's use of defamiliarization here indicates how the colonel and his colleagues have rendered a fellow human into an unrecognizable, inhuman state.

=== Epistemology ===
Ivan Vasilievich questions his ability to understand what he witnessed, attributing it to his own lack of the appropriate contextual information to judge the violence he saw. Despite not expressing his stance publicly, his actions – forsaking the military, marriage, and the civil service – demonstrate an embodied knowledge that what he bore witness to was unjust. This is in contrast to the obvious dissonance borne by Pozdnyshev in The Kreutzer Sonata in which, despite his time to reconsider the events that occurred, is last seen absorbed within his own thought; it is in his actions and thoughts on the trait that Pozdnyshev's lack of understanding of his behaviors – and the structures leading to them – can be understood.

== English translations ==
Tolstoy, Leo, Richard Pevear and Larissa Volokhonsky. The Death of Ivan Ilyich and Other Stories. New York: Alfred A. Knopf, 2009.

== See also ==
- Leo Tolstoy bibliography
- Russian literature
- Victor Shklovsky and defamiliarization
