= Confession (Leo Tolstoy) =

1882 work by Leo Tolstoy

- Author: Leo Tolstoy
- Original title: Исповѣдь [Confession]
- Language: Russian
- Published: 1884 (publication year)
- Publication place: Geneva, Switzerland
- Media type: Print (paperback, hardcover)
- Text: Confession at Wikisource

Confession (pre-reform Russian: Исповѣдь; post-reform Russian: Исповедь, romanized: Íspovedʹ), or My Confession, is a short work on the subject of melancholia, philosophy and religion by the Russian novelist Leo Tolstoy. It was written between 1879 and 1880, when Tolstoy was in his early fifties.

== Content ==
The book is a brief autobiographical story of the author's struggle with a mid-life existential crisis. It describes his search for the answer to the ultimate philosophical question: "If God does not exist, since death is inevitable, what is the meaning of life?" Without the answer to this, for him, life had become "impossible".

The story begins with the Oriental fable of the dragon in the well. A man is chased by a beast into a well, at the bottom of which is a dragon. The man clings to a branch inside the well that is being gnawed on by two mice (one black, one white, representing night and day and the relentless march of time). In this hopeless situation the man looks for and finds a few drops of honey which stick to a leaf on his branch. In the original fable the man drinks them and delights. Tolstoy on the other hand is no longer able to enjoy that which these drops represent for him: his love for his family and his writing. The certainty of death drains any joy out of his life.

Tolstoy goes on to describe four possible attitudes towards this dilemma. The first is ignorance. If one is oblivious to the fact that death is approaching, life becomes bearable. The problem with this for him personally is that he is not ignorant. Having become conscious of the reality of death, there is no going back.

The second possibility is what Tolstoy describes as Epicureanism. Being fully aware that life is ephemeral, one can enjoy the time one has. Tolstoy's problem with this is essentially moral. He states that Epicureanism may work fine and well for the minority who can afford to live "the good life", but one would have to be morally empty to be able to ignore the fact that the vast majority of people do not have access to the wealth necessary to live this kind of life.

Tolstoy next states that the most intellectually honest response to the situation would be suicide. In the face of the inevitability of death and assuming that God does not exist, why wait? Why pretend that this vale of tears means anything when one can just cut to the chase? For himself, however, Tolstoy writes that he is "too cowardly" to follow through on this most "logically consistent" response.

Finally, Tolstoy says that the fourth option, the one he is taking, is the one of just holding on; living "despite the absurdity of it", because he is not willing "or able" to do anything else. So it seems "utterly hopeless"—at least "without God".

So Tolstoy turns to the question of God's existence: After despairing of his attempts to find answers in classic philosophical arguments for the existence of God (e.g. the Cosmological Argument, which reasons that God must exist based on the need to ascribe an original cause to the universe), Tolstoy turns to a more mystical, intuitive affirmation of God's presence. He states that as soon as he said "God is Life", life was once again suffused with meaning. Tolstoy's original title for this work indicates as much, and his own personal "conversion" is suggested by an epilogue that describes a dream he had some time after completing the body of the text, confirming that he had undergone a radical personal and spiritual transformation.

== History ==
The book was originally titled An Introduction to a Criticism of Dogmatic Theology, as the first part of a four-part work that also included A Criticism of Dogmatic Theology, The Four Gospels Harmonized and Translated (the basis for The Gospel in Brief), and What I Believe (also published in English as My Religion and My Faith).

The first attempt at its publication took place in 1882 (Russkaya Mysl, No 5), but Tolstoy's work was removed virtually from the whole edition of the journal (i.e. periodical magazine) by Eastern Orthodox Church censorship. The text was later published in Geneva (1884), and in Russia as late as 1906 (Vsemirnyj Vestnik, No 1).

The book is discussed at length and quoted from in William James' The Varieties of Religious Experience and also in Maurice O'Connor Drury's The Danger of Words. It has also been commented by Jonathan Birch and discussed in length in Agnes Callard's Open Socrates: The Case for a Philosophical Life.
