= Maria Benedita Bormann =

Brazilian writer (1853–1935)

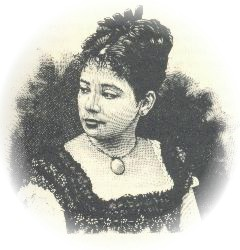
- Born: November 25, 1853; Porto Alegre, Brazil
- Died: July 1895 (aged 41–42); Rio de Janeiro, Brazil
- Other name: Délia
- Occupation: Writer
- Years active: 1881–1895

Maria Benedita Câmara Bormann (November 25, 1853 – July 1895) was a Brazilian writer who published feminist novels and other works under the pseudonym Délia.

== Early life ==
Bormann was born in 1853 in Porto Alegre, Rio Grande do Sul. Her parents were Patrício de Fontoura Lima, a civil servant in the Brazilian middle class, and Luísa Bormann de Lima; she also had a sister, Julieta. In 1863, Bormann moved with her family to Rio de Janeiro, then the capital of the Brazilian Empire.

In 1872, at the age of 19, Bormann married her maternal uncle, José Bernardino Bormann, a military marshal who had served in the Paraguayan War. He continued to be active in military work after their marriage, and was away for lengthy periods. (He was made Brazilian War Secretary in 1910, filling the post until 1914.)

From her youth onward, Bormann both wrote and drew prolifically, but destroyed all work she did not wish to have published.

== Career ==
In 1881, Bormann publicly joined the ongoing struggle for feminism in Brazil by publishing her first novel, Magdalena, in the newspaper O Sorriso. From then on until 1895, Bormann's writings were published in wide-circulation Rio de Janeiro newspapers, including Gazeta de Tarde, Gazeta de Notícias, and O Paiz. Her published work included essays, short stories, and serialized novels. For writing, she took up the pseudonym Délia, a name suggesting the Greek goddess Artemis (whose birthplace was said to be the island of Delos) as well as the ancient Roman woman Delia mentioned in the love poems of Tibullus.

Bormann's novels include Magdalena (1881), Uma Vítima (1883), Duas irmãs (1884), Aurélia (1883), Lésbia (1890), and Celeste (1894). Her works feature controversial themes that had not been seen before in Brazilian fiction, and which were seen as inappropriate for women to discuss, including female sexuality, female body imagery, and conflicts between mothers and daughters. Their protagonists are often intellectually active and sensually aware women attempting to overcome oppression from patriarchal social structures, especially those relating to families and domestic life. Lésbia, a Künstlerroman, tells the story of a creative woman who, in pursuit of both erotic and cerebral passions, breaks through her society's gender roles to explore androgyny. Celeste, a Bildungsroman, features a woman who decides to abandon her psychologically and physically abusive husband.

== Works ==
- Magdalena (1881)
- Aurélia (1883)
- Duas irmãs (1884)
- Lésbia (1890)
- Celeste (1893)
- Angelina (1894)

== Personal life ==
According to a contemporary, the writer Inês Sabino, Bormann was known as an elegant and sophisticated woman who often attended intellectual salons, sometimes singing mezzo-soprano while accompanying herself on the piano. In addition to Portuguese, she spoke English and French.

Bormann died of a stomach ulcer in July 1895.

== Reception ==
Because of their controversial treatment of female sexuality, Bormann's novels were criticized by at least two contemporary writers: Araripe Júnior dismissed Celeste's protagonist as an insane erotomaniac, while Inês Sabino referred to Bormann disparagingly as a female equivalent of Émile Zola.

After her death, Bormann's works were largely forgotten until the mid-1970s, when a new wave of interest in Brazilian women writers began. During this wave, Bormann's writings, as well as those of other neglected Brazilian women writers such as Júlia Lopes de Almeida, Maria Firmina dos Reis, Albertina Berta and Carmen Dolores, were brought back into print. The Cambridge History of Latin American Women's Literature describes Bormann as one of the most important writers of her era.
