= The Gospel in Brief =

Story by Leo Tolstoy

- Author: Leo Tolstoy
- Original title: Краткое Изложение Евангелия
- Translator: Isabel Florence Hapgood
- Language: Russian
- Genre: Religion
- Publication date: 1896
- Publication place: Russia
- Media type: Print
- Pages: 215
- ISBN: 0803294328
- Text: The Gospel in Brief at Wikisource

The Gospel in Brief (Russian: Краткое Изложение Евангелия) is an 1892 synthesis of the four gospels of the New Testament into one narrative of the life of Jesus by Russian author Leo Tolstoy.

Included in a larger volume in 1892, the 1896 account published as The Gospel in Brief is notable in that it excludes many of the supernatural aspects of the original gospels, such as their claims of Jesus's divine origins and ability to perform miracles. Instead, the work focuses on Jesus's teachings to his followers, presumably those which Tolstoy found most compelling. The Gospel in Brief is thought by some to be deeply reflective of Tolstoy's own interpretation of Christianity.

The Gospel in Brief is said to be the result of Tolstoy's close study of the original Koine Greek New Testament.

The account presented in Tolstoy's gospel is also notable in its sharp contrast with the contemporaneous views of the Russian Orthodox Church. Tolstoy was a fierce critic of the Russian Orthodox Church, which went so far as to excommunicate him for his writings on Christianity in 1901.

== History ==
In 1892, Tolstoy published A Translation Harmony and Analysis of the Gospels. Concerned that the complexity of this volume would alienate it from laypeople, Tolstoy collected just the introductions and summaries of the 12 chapters of A Translation Harmony. This much shorter volume was published in 1896 as The Gospel in Brief.

== Influence ==
Austrian-British philosopher Ludwig Wittgenstein was profoundly influenced by The Gospel in Brief, which he described as a "magnificent work." After stumbling upon the book in a Polish bookstore, Wittgenstein carried the book around with him "constantly, like a talisman." He took the book with him into World War I, recommending it to fellow soldiers. Wittgenstein's enthusiasm about the book during this period was so great that he became known among the soldiers as the "man with the Gospels". In a letter to Ludwig von Ficker, Wittgenstein wrote:

"Are you acquainted with Tolstoy's The Gospel in Brief? At its time, this book virtually kept me alive... If you are not acquainted with it, then you cannot imagine what an effect it can have upon a person."

Some modern scholars even hypothesize that the 12-part organization of The Gospel in Brief influenced the numbering layout of Wittgenstein's landmark philosophical work, the Tractatus Logico-Philosophicus.

== In popular culture ==
In 2014, playwright Scott Carter wrote The Gospel According to Thomas Jefferson, Charles Dickens and Count Leo Tolstoy: Discord, a play that depicts Thomas Jefferson, Charles Dickens, and Leo Tolstoy stuck in purgatory together, as each of the three men wrote his own interpretation of the Gospels (Jefferson wrote The Life and Morals of Jesus of Nazareth and Dickens wrote The Life of Our Lord). In the play, the trio must come to a theological agreement before they are allowed to enter heaven.

== See also ==
- The Jefferson Bible
