= Foma Gordeyev =

Novel by Maxim Gorky

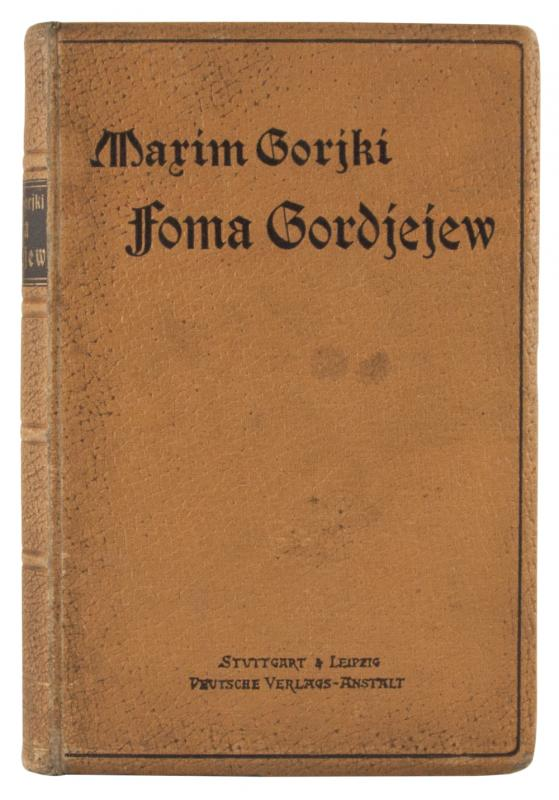
- First German edition (1901)
- Author: Maxim Gorky
- Original title: Фома Гордеев
- Language: Russian
- Genre: novel
- Publisher: Charles Scribner's Sons
- Publication date: 1899
- Publication place: Russian Empire
- English publication date: 1901
- Media type: Print (Paperback & Hardback)

Foma Gordeyev or The Man Who Was Afraid (Gordeev) [Russian: Фома Гордеев] is an 1899 novel by Maxim Gorky.

It was first published by Zhizn magazine in February–September 1899 and came out as a separate edition in 1900, as part of the Zhizn Library (vol.3), with a dedication to Anton Chekhov.

Foma Gordeyev was translated by Isabel F. Hapgood in 1901.

== Background ==
Gorky started working on Foma Gordeyev in 1898. "It is supposed to present the broad and true picture of the contemporary life, while featuring the figure of an energetic, healthy man, craving for space to realize his power's potential. He feels restricted. Life smothers him. He realizes that there is no place for heroes in it, they apt to being defeated by small things, like Hercules, the conqueror of hydras, crashed by hordes of mosquitoes," he wrote in a February 1898 letter to the publisher S. Dorovatsky. Gorky considered his hero an atypical figure in the context of Russian merchant community. "Foma is just a sprightly man looking for freedom but feeling thwarted by life's conventions," he wrote in the same letter, promising to soon embark upon another novel, telling by way of redressing the balance, the life of a 'true' tradesman, a smart and cynical crook, going by the name of Mikhail Vyagin (the project never materialized). In his correspondence Gorky complained about numerous cuts made by the governmental censors. He radically revised the text twice, in 1900 and 1903.

== Reception ==
The novel was highly rated among the socialist critics and writers. Jack London in his review writes: "Foma Gordyeeff" is a big book—not only is the breadth of Russia in it, but the expanse of life. Yet, though in each land, in this world of marts and exchanges, this age of trade and traffic, passionate figures rise up and demand of life what its fever is, in "Foma Gordyeeff" it is a Russian who so rises up and demands. For Gorky, the Bitter One, is essentially a Russian in his grasp on the facts of life and in his treatment. All the Russian self-analysis and insistent introspection are his. And, like all his brother Russians, ardent, passionate protest impregnates his work."

== Adaptations ==
The eponymous Soviet film by Mark Donskoy, based on the novel, came out in 1959.
