= Female artist's novel =

Female artist's novel is a literary subtype of Kunstlerroman which can be defined as a literary procedure which deals with the main female protagonist’s growing to maturity and gaining experience and independence as an artist, namely a writer. Based on the major assumptions of Kunstlerroman, female artist’s novel works as a portrayal of a woman’s artistic struggle as she acquires artistic freedom and masters the artistic craft of being a writer and gaining literary dexterity. The scope of the genre is deeply rooted in the main assumptions of Kunstlerroman, where the growth of the character is displayed from one's youth to adulthood and deals with one's emotional and personal development on the way to artistic fulfillment.

As opposed to Kunstlerroman, female artist's novel focuses only on a female writer, who besides being a capable artist and creator of her own reality, is often to perform many social roles simultaneously(e.g. the role of a wife, a mother, home guardian, etc.) to meet expectations the society imposes on her.

The genre itself is more gendered due to its focus on a female position.

== Examples ==
- The Last Painting of Sara de Vos by Dominic Smith
- Isadora by Amelia Gray, about Isadora Duncan
- The Queen of the Night by Alexander Chee
- Cat's Eye (novel) by Margaret Atwood
- Swing Time (novel) by Zadie Smith
- The Woman Upstairs by Claire Messud
- The Hours by Michael Cunningham, about Virginia Woolf
- The Blazing World by Siri Hustvedt
- The Children’s Book by A.S. Byatt
- The Last Nude by Ellis Avery, about Tamara de Lempicka
- The Painter from Shanghai by Jennifer Cody Epstein, about Pan Yuliang
- The Dollmaker by Harriette Arnow
- The Song of the Lark by Willa Cather
