= Sevastopol Sketches =

1855 short story collection by Leo Tolstoy

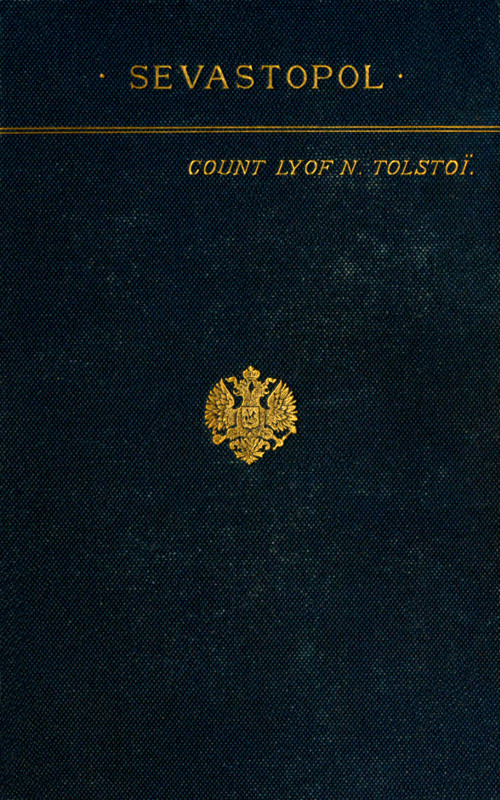
- Cover of the 1888 English edition.
- Author: Leo Tolstoy
- Original title: Севастопольскіе разсказы
- Translator: Isabel Florence Hapgood
- Language: Russian
- Subject: Crimean War, philosophy of war
- Publication date: 1855
- Publication place: Russia
- English publication date: 1887 (Harper)
- Pages: 240 p. (Paperback)

The Sevastopol Sketches (pre-reform Russian: Севастопольскіе разсказы, romanized: Sevastópolʹskiye razskázy; post-reform Russian: Севастопольские рассказы, romanized: Sevastópolʹskiye rasskázy), translated into English as Sebastopol Sketches or Sebastopol Stories or Sevastopol Sketches or Stories, are three short stories by Leo Tolstoy published in 1855 to record his experiences during the previous year's siege of Sevastopol in Crimea. These brief "sketches" formed the basis of many episodes in Tolstoy's most famous novel, War and Peace.

== Sketches ==
=== Sevastopol in December ===
In Sevastopol in December, Tolstoy uses second-person narrative (with the pronoun "you") in an introductory tour of life in Sevastopol. The detailed tour is arguably similar to one Tolstoy may have been given upon arrival in Sevastopol in November 1854. As part of the tour, the narrator takes you through the dressing-station or makeshift hospital in the Assembly Hall. Here you find wounded soldiers, amputees, "some of them on camp beds, but most of them lying on the floor". Tolstoy introduces the reader to the settings, mannerisms, and background he later uses in Sevastopol in May and Sevastopol in August. For example, the British and French enemy are referred to as "'him', as both soldiers and sailors say" (Tolstoy 198).

=== Sevastopol in May ===
In Sevastopol in May, Tolstoy examines the senselessness and vanity of war. The story examines many aspects of the psychology of war, heroism, and the misleading humanism in truces which invariably end in more wars. Tolstoy concludes by declaring that the only hero of his story is truth.

=== Sevastopol in August ===
Sevastopol in August depicts the conclusion of the siege of Sevastopol and the eventual defeat and withdrawal of the Russian forces. The narrative focus alternates between Mikhail and Vladimir Kozeltsov, two brothers who both fight and eventually die for the Russian side.

== See also ==
- Leo Tolstoy bibliography
