= Boyhood (novel) =

1854 novel by Leo Tolstoy

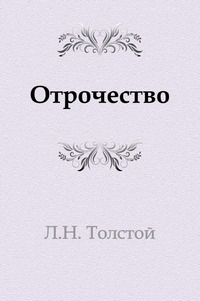
- Author: Leo Tolstoy
- Original title: Отрочество (Otrochestvo)
- Translator: C. J. Hogarth
- Language: Russian
- Publisher: Sovremennik
- Publication date: 1854
- Publication place: Russia
- Preceded by: Childhood
- Followed by: Youth

Boyhood (Russian: Отрочество, Otrochestvo) is the second novel in Leo Tolstoy's autobiographical trilogy, following Childhood and followed by Youth. The novel was first published in the Russian literary journal Sovremennik in 1854.

Later in life, Tolstoy expressed his unhappiness with the book.

== See also ==
Leo Tolstoy bibliography
