= Youth (Tolstoy novel) =

1857 novel by Leo Tolstoy

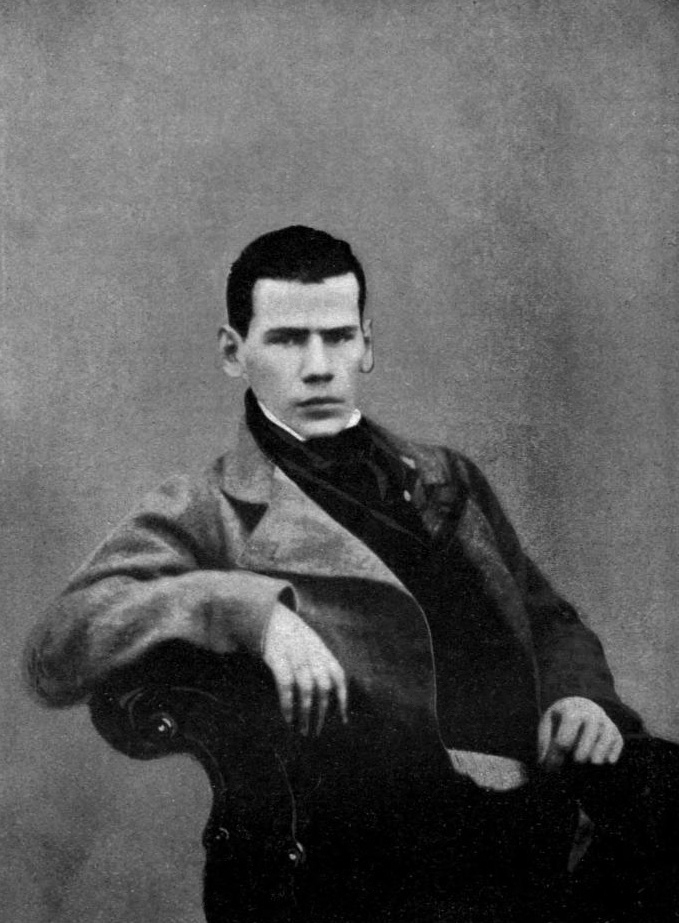
- Tolstoy as a young man, c. 1848
- Author: Leo Tolstoy
- Original title: Юность (Yunost)
- Translator: C. J. Hogarth
- Language: Russian
- Published: 1857 (Sovremennik)
- Publication place: Russia
- Preceded by: Boyhood

Youth (Russian: Юность [Yunost']; 1857) is the third novel in Leo Tolstoy's autobiographical trilogy, following Childhood and Boyhood. It was first published in the popular Russian literary magazine Sovremennik.

Later in life, Tolstoy expressed his unhappiness with this book and the second in the trilogy, Boyhood.

== See also ==
Leo Tolstoy bibliography
