= Leo Tolstoy =

Russian writer (1828–1910)

Count Leo Tolstoy
- Лев Толстой
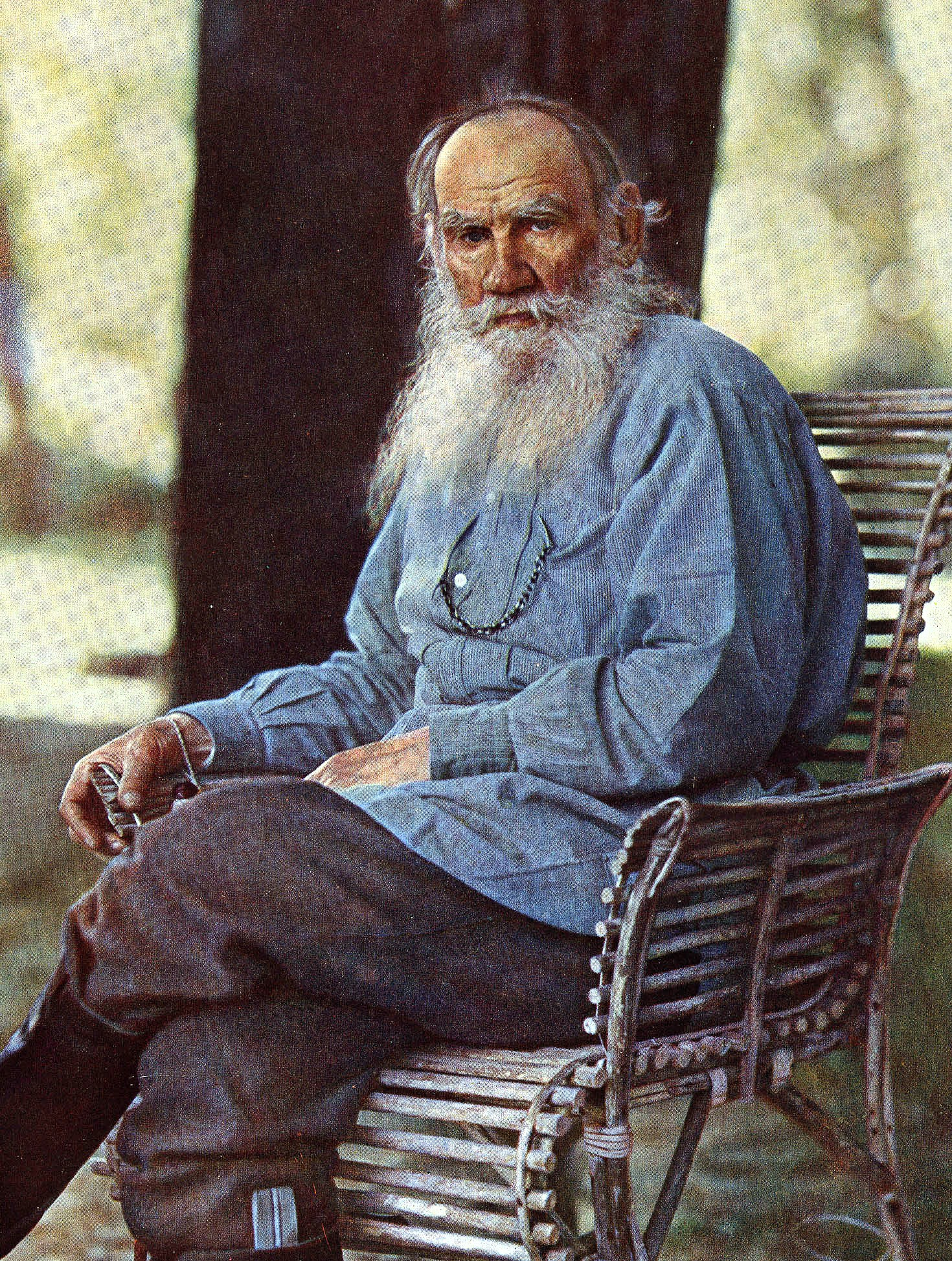
- Tolstoy in 1908
- Born: Lev Nikolayevich Tolstoy; 9 September [O.S. 28 August] 1828; Yasnaya Polyana, Russia
- Died: 20 November [O.S. 7 November] 1910 (aged 82); Astapovo, Russia
- Education: Imperial Kazan University (dropped out)
- Occupations: Writer; religious thinker
- Spouse: Sophia Behrs (m. 1862)
- Children: 14
- Writing career
- Years active: 1847–1910
- Period: Modern
- Genres: Novel; novella; short story; sketch; play; children's literature; song; polemic; essay; treatise; epistle; literary criticism; art criticism; textbook; autobiography; diary; translation; correspondence
- Subjects: Christian anarchism; pacifism
- Notable work: List
- Notable awards: Griboyedov Prize (1892)
- Movement: Realism
- Tolstoy's voice Recorded 1908

Count Lev Nikolayevich Tolstoy (Note: In this name that follows East Slavic naming customs, the patronymic is Nikolayevich and the family name is Tolstoy. Tolstoy pronounced his first name as [lʲɵf], which corresponds to the romanization Lyov. (Nabokov, Vladimir. Lectures on Russian literature. p. 216.)) (/ˈtoʊlstɔɪ, ˈtɒl-/; Russian: Лев Николаевич Толстой, (Note: Throughout Tolstoy's whole life, his name was written as Левъ Николаевичъ Толстой using pre-reform Russian orthography.) IPA: [ˈlʲef nʲɪkɐˈla(j)ɪvʲɪtɕ tɐlˈstoj]; 9 September [O.S. 28 August] 1828 – 20 November [O.S. 7 November] 1910), usually referred to in English as Leo Tolstoy, was a Russian writer. He is regarded as one of the greatest and most influential authors of all time.

Born to an aristocratic family, Tolstoy achieved acclaim in his twenties with his semi-autobiographical trilogy, Childhood, Boyhood and Youth (1852–1856), and with Sevastopol Sketches (1855), based on his experiences in the Crimean War. War and Peace (1869), Anna Karenina (1878), and Resurrection (1899), which is based on his "youthful sins", are often cited as pinnacles of realist fiction and three of the greatest novels ever written. His oeuvre includes short stories such as "Alyosha the Pot" (1911) and "After the Ball" (1911) and novellas such as Family Happiness (1859), The Death of Ivan Ilyich (1886), The Kreutzer Sonata (1889), The Devil (1911), and Hadji Murat (1912). He also wrote plays and essays concerning philosophical, moral and religious themes.

In the 1870s, Tolstoy experienced a profound moral crisis, followed by what he regarded as an equally profound spiritual awakening, as outlined in his non-fiction work Confession (1882). His literal interpretation of the ethical teachings of Jesus, centering on the Sermon on the Mount, caused him to become a fervent Christian anarchist and pacifist. His ideas on nonviolent resistance, expressed in such works as The Kingdom of God Is Within You (1894), had a profound impact on such pivotal 20th-century figures as Mahatma Gandhi, Ludwig Wittgenstein, Martin Luther King Jr., and James Bevel. He also became a dedicated advocate of Georgism, the economic philosophy of Henry George, which he incorporated into his writing, particularly in Resurrection.

Tolstoy received praise from countless authors and critics, both during his lifetime and after. Virginia Woolf called Tolstoy "the greatest of all novelists", and Gary Saul Morson referred to War and Peace as the greatest of all novels. He received nominations for the Nobel Prize in Literature every year from 1902 to 1906 and for the Nobel Peace Prize in 1901, 1902, and 1909. Tolstoy never being awarded a Nobel Prize remains a major Nobel Prize controversy.

== Origins ==
The Tolstoys were a well-known family of old Russian nobility who traced their ancestry to a mythical nobleman named Indris described by Pyotr Tolstoy as arriving "from Nemec, from the lands of Caesar" to Chernigov in 1353 along with his two sons Litvinos (or Litvonis) and Zimonten (or Zigmont) and a druzhina of 3000 people. Indris was then converted to Eastern Orthodoxy, under the name of Leonty, and his sons as Konstantin and Feodor. Konstantin's grandson Andrei Kharitonovich was nicknamed Tolstiy (translated as fat) by Vasily II of Moscow after he moved from Chernigov to Moscow.

Because of the pagan names and the fact that Chernigov at the time was ruled by Demetrius I Starshy, some researchers concluded that they were Lithuanians who arrived from the Grand Duchy of Lithuania. At the same time, no mention of Indris was ever found in the 14th-to-16th-century documents, while the Chernigov Chronicles used by Pyotr Tolstoy as a reference were lost. The first documented members of the Tolstoy family also lived during the 17th century, thus Pyotr Tolstoy himself is generally considered the founder of the noble house, being granted the title of count by Peter the Great.

== Life and career ==
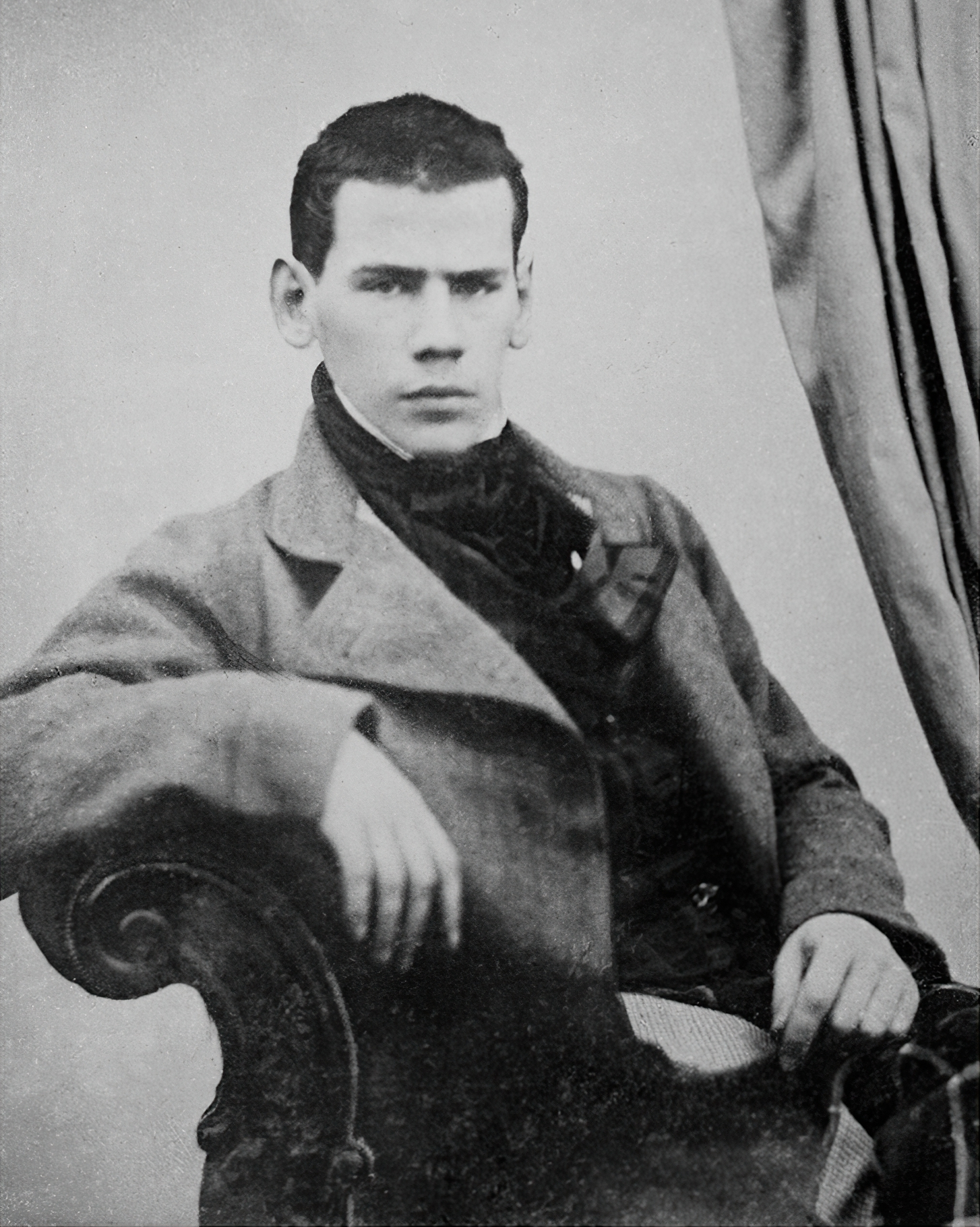
Tolstoy at age 20, c. 1848

Tolstoy was born at Yasnaya Polyana, a family estate 12 kilometres (7.5 mi) southwest of Tula, and 200 kilometres (120 mi) south of Moscow. He was the fourth of five children of Count Nikolai Ilyich Tolstoy (1794–1837), a veteran of the Patriotic War of 1812, and Princess Mariya Tolstaya (née Volkonskaya; 1790–1830). His mother died when he was two and his father when he was nine. Tolstoy and his siblings were brought up by relatives. In 1844, he began studying law and oriental languages at Kazan University, where teachers described him as "both unable and unwilling to learn". Tolstoy left the university in the middle of his studies, returned to Yasnaya Polyana and then spent much time in Moscow, Tula and Saint Petersburg, leading a lax and leisurely lifestyle. He began writing during this period, including his first novel Childhood, a fictitious account of his own youth, which was published in 1852. In 1851, after running up heavy gambling debts, he went with his older brother to the Caucasus and joined the army. Tolstoy served as a young artillery officer during the Crimean War and was in Sevastopol during the 11-month-long siege of Sevastopol in 1854–55, including the Battle of the Chernaya. During the war he was recognised for his courage and promoted to lieutenant. He was appalled by the number of deaths involved in warfare, and left the army after the end of the Crimean War.

His experience in the army, and two trips around Europe in 1857 and 1860–61 converted Tolstoy from a dissolute and privileged society author to a non-violent and spiritual anarchist. Others who followed the same path were Alexander Herzen, Mikhail Bakunin and Peter Kropotkin. During his 1857 visit, Tolstoy witnessed a public execution in Paris, a traumatic experience that marked the rest of his life. In a letter to his friend Vasily Botkin, Tolstoy wrote: "The truth is that the State is a conspiracy designed not only to exploit, but above all to corrupt its citizens ... Henceforth, I shall never serve any government anywhere." Tolstoy's concept of non-violence or ahimsa was bolstered when he read a German version of the Tirukkural. He later instilled the concept in Mahatma Gandhi through his "A Letter to a Hindu" when young Gandhi corresponded with him seeking his advice.

His European trip in 1860–61 shaped both his political and literary development when he met Victor Hugo. Tolstoy read Hugo's newly finished Les Misérables. The similar evocation of battle scenes in Hugo's novel and Tolstoy's War and Peace indicates this influence. Tolstoy's political philosophy was also influenced by a March 1861 visit to French anarchist Pierre-Joseph Proudhon, then living in exile under an assumed name in Brussels. Tolstoy reviewed Proudhon's forthcoming publication, La Guerre et la Paix ("War and Peace" in French), and later used the title for his masterpiece. The two men also discussed education, as Tolstoy wrote in his educational notebooks: "If I recount this conversation with Proudhon, it is to show that, in my personal experience, he was the only man who understood the significance of education and of the printing press in our time."

Fired by enthusiasm, Tolstoy returned to Yasnaya Polyana and founded 13 schools for the children of Russia's peasants, who had just been emancipated from serfdom in 1861. Tolstoy described the schools' principles in his 1862 essay "The School at Yasnaya Polyana". His educational experiments were short-lived, partly due to harassment by the Tsarist secret police. However, as a direct forerunner to A.S. Neill's Summerhill School, the school at Yasnaya Polyana can justifiably be claimed the first example of a coherent theory of democratic education.

== Personal life ==
The death of his brother Nikolay in 1860 had an impact on Tolstoy, and led him to a desire to marry. On 23 September 1862, Tolstoy married Sophia Andreevna Behrs, who was sixteen years his junior and the daughter of a court physician. She was called Sonya, the Russian diminutive of Sofia, by her family and friends. They had 13 children, eight of whom survived childhood:

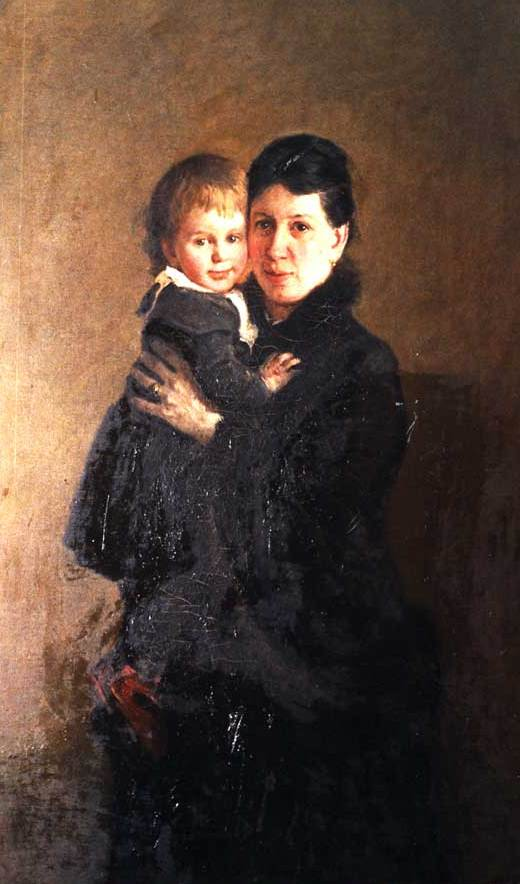
Tolstoy's wife Sophia and their daughter Alexandra

- Count Sergei Lvovich Tolstoy (1863–1947), composer and ethnomusicologist
- Countess Tatyana Lvovna Tolstaya (1864–1950), wife of Mikhail Sergeevich Sukhotin
- Count Ilya Lvovich Tolstoy (1866–1933), writer
- Count Lev Lvovich Tolstoy (1869–1945), writer and sculptor
- Countess Maria Lvovna Tolstaya (1871–1906), wife of Prince Nikolai Leonidovich Obolensky
- Count Peter Lvovich Tolstoy (1872–1873), died in infancy
- Count Nikolai Lvovich Tolstoy (1874–1875), died in infancy
- Countess Varvara Lvovna Tolstaya (1875–1875), died in infancy
- Count Andrei Lvovich Tolstoy (1877–1916), served in the Russo-Japanese War
- Count Michael Lvovich Tolstoy (1879–1944)
- Count Alexei Lvovich Tolstoy (1881–1886)
- Countess Alexandra Lvovna Tolstaya (1884–1979)
- Count Ivan Lvovich Tolstoy (1888–1895)

Tolstoy, on the eve of their marriage, gave her his diaries detailing his extensive sexual past and the fact that one of the serfs on his estate had borne him a son. Even so, their early married life was happy and allowed Tolstoy much freedom and the support system to compose War and Peace and Anna Karenina, with Sonya acting as his secretary, editor, and financial manager. Sonya was copying and hand-writing his epic works time after time. Tolstoy would continue editing War and Peace and had to have clean final drafts to be delivered to the publisher.

However, their later life together has been described by A.N. Wilson as one of the unhappiest in literary history. Tolstoy's relationship with his wife deteriorated as his beliefs became increasingly radical. This saw him seeking to reject his inherited and earned wealth, including the renunciation of the copyrights on his earlier works.

When he was finishing up the last installments of Anna Karenina Tolstoy was in an anguished state of mind and he began putting away guns and ropes out of fear that he would kill himself.

Some members of the Tolstoy family left Russia in the aftermath of the 1905 Russian Revolution, or after the establishment of the Soviet Union following the 1917 October Revolution, and many of Leo Tolstoy's relatives and descendants today live in Sweden, Germany, the United Kingdom, France and the United States. Tolstoy's son, Count Lev Lvovich Tolstoy, settled in Sweden and married a Swedish woman, and their descendants with family names including Tolstoy, Paus and Ceder still live in Sweden. The Paus branch of the family is also closely related to Henrik Ibsen. Leo Tolstoy's last surviving grandchild, Countess Tatiana Tolstoy-Paus, died in 2007 at Herresta manor in Sweden, which is owned by Tolstoy's descendants. Swedish writer Daria Paus and jazz singer Viktoria Tolstoy are among Leo Tolstoy's Swedish descendants.

One of his great-great-grandsons, Vladimir Tolstoy (born 1962), has been a director of the Yasnaya Polyana museum since 1994 and an adviser to the President of Russia on cultural affairs since 2012. Ilya Tolstoy's great-grandson, Pyotr Tolstoy, is a well-known Russian journalist and TV presenter as well as a State Duma deputy since 2016. His cousin Fyokla Tolstaya (born Anna Tolstaya in 1971), daughter of the acclaimed Soviet Slavist Nikita Tolstoy (ru) (1923–1996), is also a Russian journalist, TV and radio host. American actress Pati Behrs (1922–2004) was his wife's great-niece and her daughter, screenwriter Sean Catherine Derek (b. 1953), is her great-grandniece.

== Novels and fictional works ==
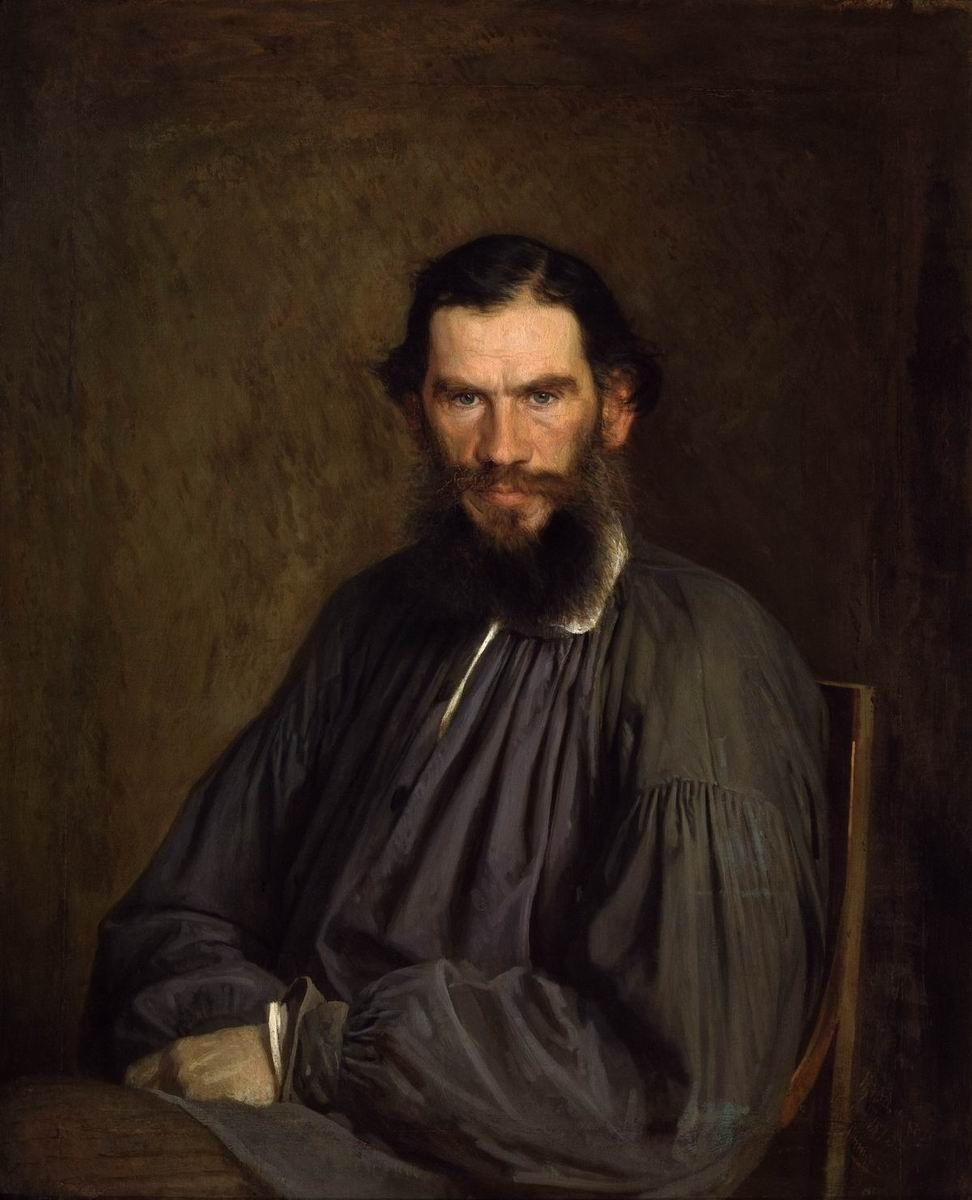
Portrait of Leo Tolstoy by Ivan Kramskoi, 1873

Tolstoy is considered one of the giants of Russian literature; his works include the novels War and Peace and Anna Karenina and novellas such as Hadji Murat and The Death of Ivan Ilyich. Tolstoy's earliest works, the autobiographical novels Childhood, Boyhood, and Youth (1852–1856), tell of a rich landowner's son and his slow realization of the chasm between himself and his peasants. Though he later rejected them as sentimental, a great deal of Tolstoy's own life is revealed. They retain their relevance as accounts of the universal story of growing up. Tolstoy's service as a second lieutenant in an artillery regiment during the Crimean War is recounted in his Sevastopol Sketches. His experiences in battle helped stir his subsequent pacifism and gave him material for realistic depiction of the horrors of war in his later work.

His fiction consistently attempts to convey realistically the Russian society in which he lived. The Cossacks (1863) describes the Cossack life and people through a story of a Russian aristocrat in love with a Cossack girl. Anna Karenina (1877) tells parallel stories of an adulterous woman trapped by the conventions and falsities of society and of a philosophical landowner (much like Tolstoy), who works alongside the peasants in the fields and seeks to reform their lives. Tolstoy not only drew from his own life experiences but also created characters in his own image, such as Pierre Bezukhov and Prince Andrei in War and Peace, Levin in Anna Karenina and to some extent, Prince Nekhlyudov in Resurrection. Richard Pevear, who translated many of Tolstoy's works, said of Tolstoy's signature style, "His works are full of provocation and irony, and written with broad and elaborately developed rhetorical devices."

The Power of Darkness
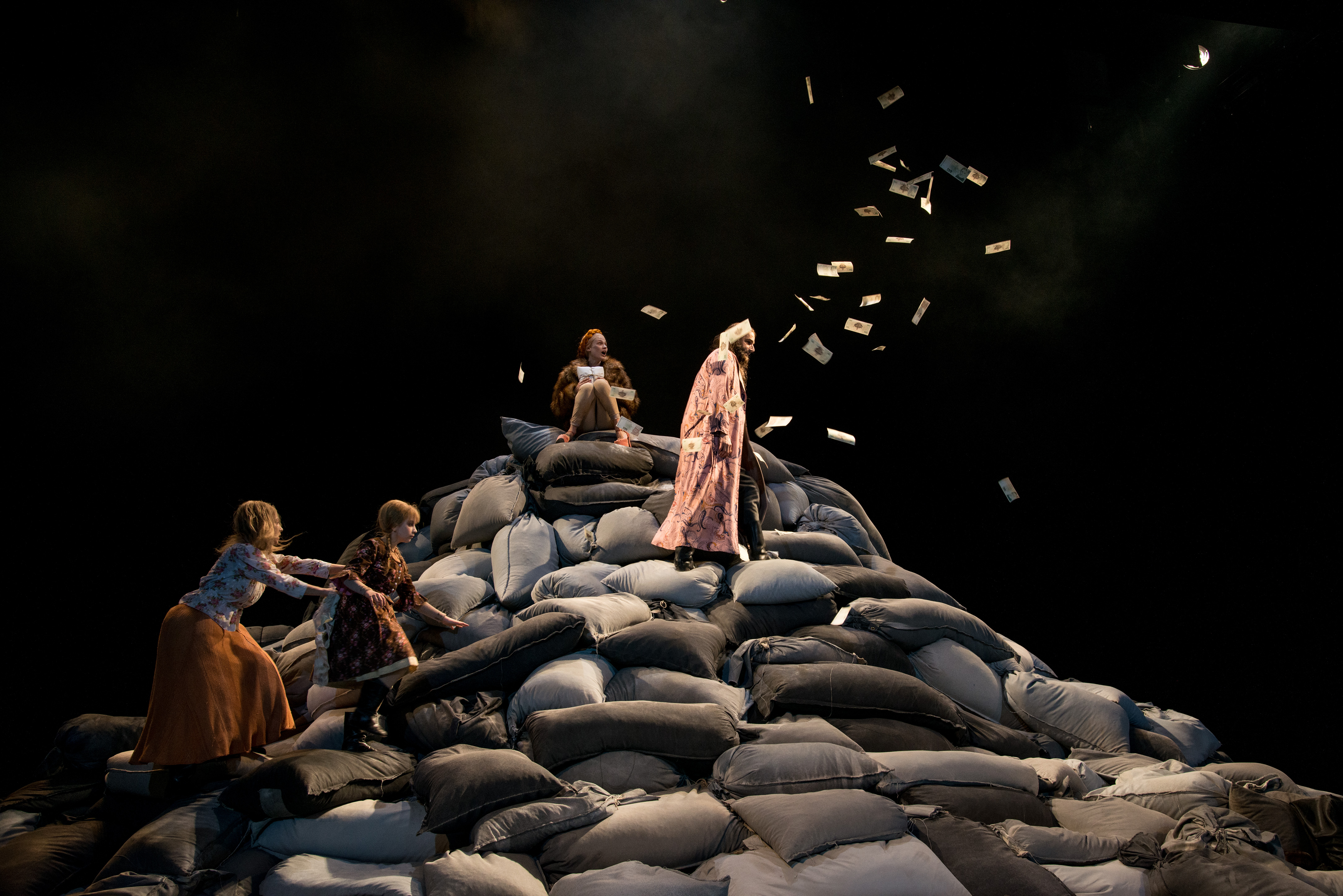
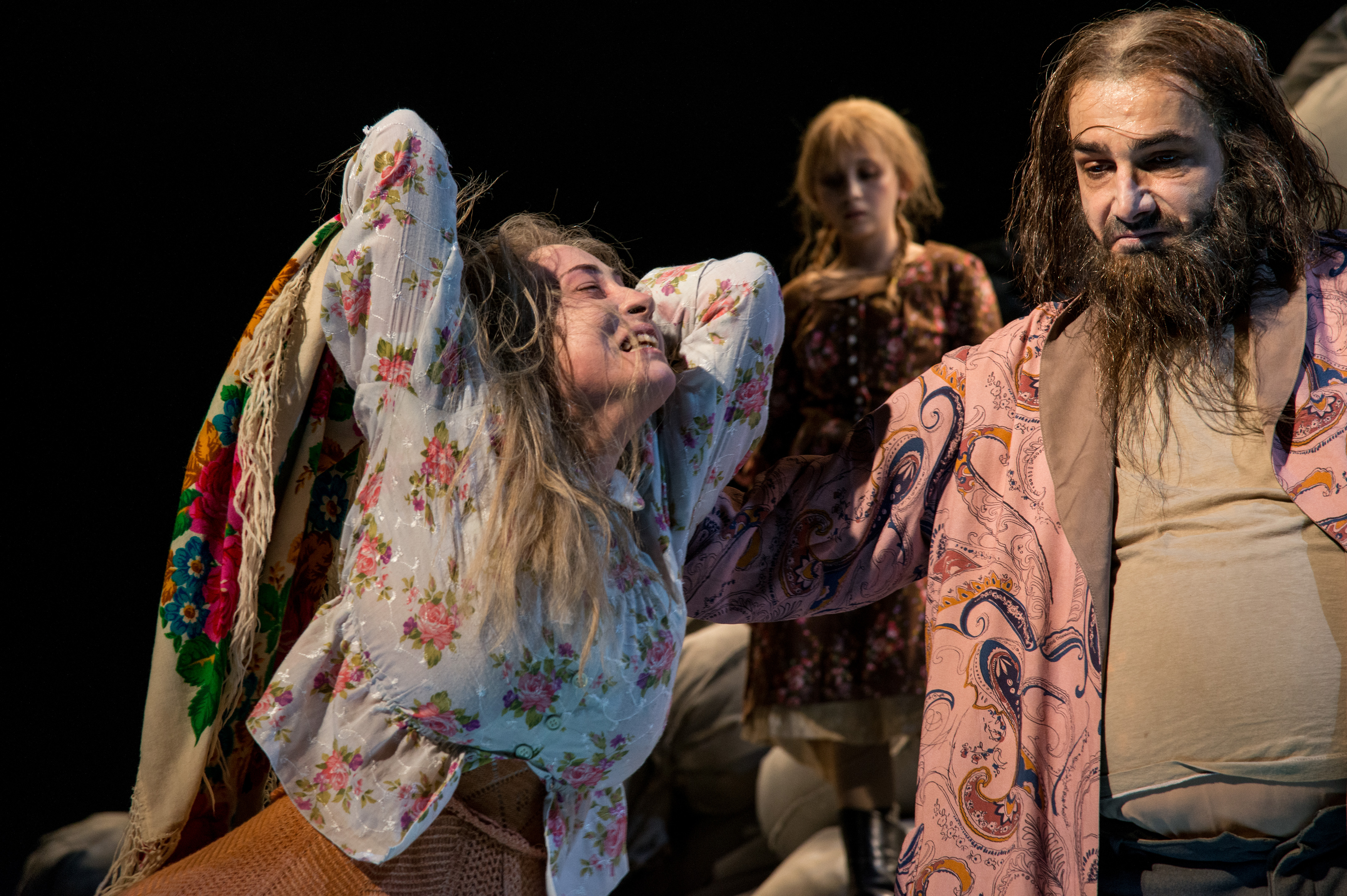
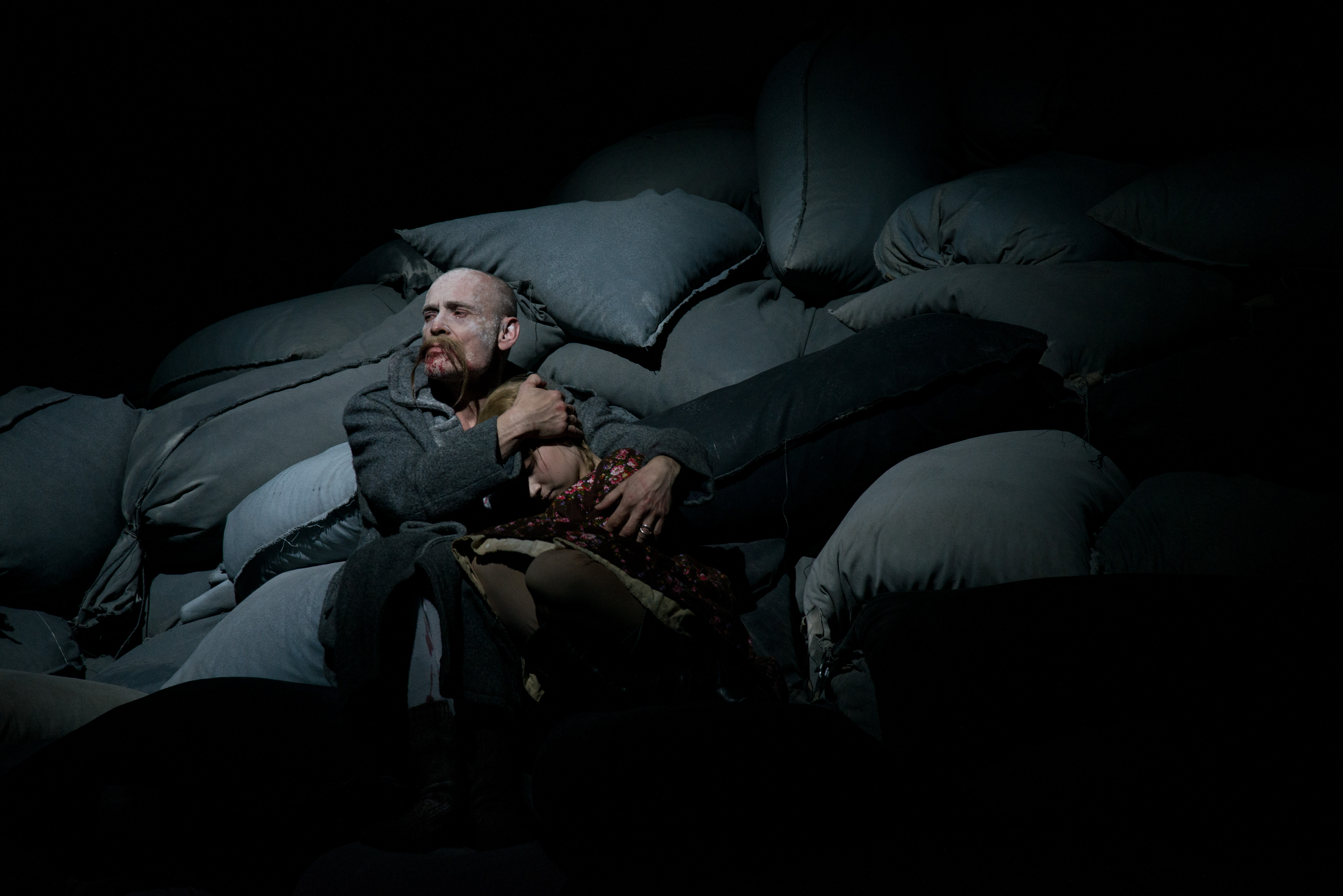
2015 at Vienna's Akademietheater

War and Peace is generally thought to be one of the greatest novels ever written, remarkable for its dramatic breadth and unity. Its vast canvas includes 580 characters, many historical with others fictional. The story moves from family life to the headquarters of Napoleon, from the court of Alexander I of Russia to the battlefields of Austerlitz and Borodino. Tolstoy's original idea for the novel was to investigate the causes of the Decembrist revolt, to which it refers only in the last chapters, from which can be deduced that Andrei Bolkonsky's son will become one of the Decembrists. The novel explores Tolstoy's theory of history, and in particular the insignificance of individuals such as Napoleon and Alexander. Somewhat surprisingly, Tolstoy did not consider War and Peace to be a novel (nor did he consider many of the great Russian fictions written at that time to be novels). This view becomes less surprising if one considers that Tolstoy was a novelist of the realist school who considered the novel to be a framework for the examination of social and political issues in nineteenth-century life. War and Peace (which is to Tolstoy really an epic in prose) therefore did not qualify. Tolstoy called Anna Karenina his first novel.

After Anna Karenina, Tolstoy concentrated on Christian themes, and his later novels such as The Death of Ivan Ilyich (1886) and What Is to Be Done? develop a radical anarcho-pacifist Christian philosophy which led to his excommunication from the Russian Orthodox Church in 1901. After his religious conversion, Tolstoy came to reject most modern Western culture, including his novels War and Peace and Anna Karenina, as elitist "counterfeit art" with different aims from the Christian art of universal brotherly love he sought to express.

In his novel Resurrection, Tolstoy attempts to expose the injustice of man-made laws and the hypocrisy of an institutionalized church. Tolstoy also explores and explains the economic philosophy of Georgism, of which he had become a very strong advocate towards the end of his life.

Tolstoy also tried writing poetry, with several soldier songs written during his military service, and fairy tales in verse such as Volga-bogatyr and Oaf stylized as national folk songs. They were written between 1871 and 1874 for his Russian Book for Reading, a collection of short stories in four volumes (total of 629 stories in various genres) published along with the New Azbuka textbook and addressed to schoolchildren. Nevertheless, he was skeptical about poetry as a genre. As he famously said, "Writing poetry is like ploughing and dancing at the same time." According to Valentin Bulgakov, he criticised poets, including Alexander Pushkin, for their "false" epithets used "simply to make it rhyme".

== Critical appraisal by other authors ==
Tolstoy's contemporaries paid him lofty tributes. Fyodor Dostoyevsky, who died thirty years before Tolstoy, admired and was delighted by Tolstoy's novels (and, conversely, Tolstoy also admired Dostoyevsky's work). Gustave Flaubert, on reading a translation of War and Peace, exclaimed, "What an artist and what a psychologist!" Anton Chekhov, who often visited Tolstoy at his country estate, wrote, "When literature possesses a Tolstoy, it is easy and pleasant to be a writer; even when you know you have achieved nothing yourself and are still achieving nothing, this is not as terrible as it might otherwise be, because Tolstoy achieves for everyone. What he does serves to justify all the hopes and aspirations invested in literature." The 19th-century British poet and critic Matthew Arnold wrote that "A novel by Tolstoy is not a work of art but a piece of life." Isaac Babel said that "if the world could write by itself, it would write like Tolstoy."

Later novelists continued to appreciate Tolstoy's art, but sometimes also expressed criticism. Arthur Conan Doyle wrote, "I am attracted by his earnestness and by his power of detail, but I am repelled by his looseness of construction and by his unreasonable and impracticable mysticism." Virginia Woolf declared him "the greatest of all novelists". James Joyce noted that, "He is never dull, never stupid, never tired, never pedantic, never theatrical!" Thomas Mann wrote of Tolstoy's seemingly guileless artistry: "Seldom did art work so much like nature." Vladimir Nabokov heaped superlatives upon The Death of Ivan Ilyich and Anna Karenina; he questioned, however, the reputation of War and Peace and sharply criticized Resurrection and The Kreutzer Sonata. However, Nabokov called Tolstoy the "greatest Russian writer of prose fiction". Critic Harold Bloom called Hadji Murat "my personal touchstone for the sublime in prose fiction, to me the best story in the world." When William Faulkner was asked to list what he thought were the three greatest novels, he replied: "Anna Karenina, Anna Karenina, and Anna Karenina". Critic Gary Saul Morson referred to War and Peace as the greatest of all novels.

== Ethical, political and religious beliefs ==
=== Schopenhauer ===
After reading Arthur Schopenhauer's The World as Will and Representation, Tolstoy gradually became converted to the ascetic morality upheld in that work as the proper spiritual path for the upper classes. In 1869 he writes: "Do you know what this summer has meant for me? Constant raptures over Schopenhauer and a whole series of spiritual delights which I've never experienced before....no student has ever studied so much on his course, and learned so much, as I have this summer."

In Chapter VI of Confession, Tolstoy quoted the final paragraph of Schopenhauer's work. It explains how a complete denial of self causes only a relative nothingness which is not to be feared. Tolstoy was struck by the description of Christian, Buddhist, and Hindu ascetic renunciation as being the path to holiness. After reading passages such as the following, which abound in Schopenhauer's ethical chapters, the Russian nobleman chose poverty and formal denial of the will:

But this very necessity of involuntary suffering (by poor people) for eternal salvation is also expressed by that utterance of the Savior (Matthew 19:24): "It is easier for a camel to go through the eye of a needle, than for a rich man to enter into the kingdom of God." Therefore, those who were greatly in earnest about their eternal salvation, chose voluntary poverty when fate had denied this to them and they had been born in wealth. Thus Buddha Sakyamuni was born a prince, but voluntarily took to the mendicant's staff; and Francis of Assisi, the founder of the mendicant orders who, as a youngster at a ball, where the daughters of all the notabilities were sitting together, was asked: "Now Francis, will you not soon make your choice from these beauties?" and who replied: "I have made a far more beautiful choice!" "Whom?" "La povertà (poverty)": whereupon he abandoned every thing shortly afterwards and wandered through the land as a mendicant.

=== Christianity ===
In 1884, Tolstoy wrote a book called What I Believe, in which he openly confessed his Christian beliefs. He affirmed his belief in Jesus Christ's teachings and was particularly influenced by the Sermon on the Mount, and the injunction to turn the other cheek, which he understood as a "commandment of non-resistance to evil by force" and a doctrine of pacifism and nonviolence. In his work The Kingdom of God Is Within You, he explains that he considered mistaken the Church's doctrine because they had made a "perversion" of Christ's teachings. Tolstoy also received letters from American Quakers who introduced him to the non-violence writings of Quaker Christians such as George Fox, William Penn, and Jonathan Dymond. Later, various versions of "Tolstoy's Bible" were published, indicating the passages Tolstoy most relied on, specifically, the reported words of Jesus himself.

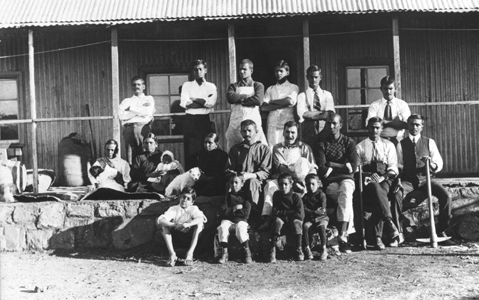
Mohandas K. Gandhi and other residents of Tolstoy Farm, South Africa, 1910

Tolstoy believed that a true Christian could find lasting happiness by striving for inner perfection through following the Great Commandment of loving one's neighbor and God, rather than guidance from the Church or state. Another distinct attribute of his philosophy based on Christ's teachings is nonresistance during conflict. This idea, communicated in Tolstoy's book The Kingdom of God Is Within You, directly influenced Mahatma Gandhi and by extension nonviolent resistance movements as a whole.

Tolstoy believed that the aristocracy was a burden on the poor. He opposed private land ownership and the institution of marriage, and valued chastity and sexual abstinence (discussed in Father Sergius and his preface to The Kreutzer Sonata), ideals also held by the young Gandhi. Tolstoy's passion from the depth of his austere moral views is reflected in his later work. One example is the sequence of the temptation of Sergius in Father Sergius. Maxim Gorky relates how Tolstoy once read this passage before him and Chekhov, and Tolstoy was moved to tears by the end of the reading. Later passages of rare power include the personal crises faced by the protagonists of The Death of Ivan Ilyich, and of Master and Man, where the main character in the former and the reader in the latter are made aware of the foolishness of the protagonists' lives.

In 1886, Tolstoy wrote to the Russian explorer and anthropologist Nicholas Miklouho-Maclay, who was one of the first anthropologists to refute polygenism, the view that the different races of mankind belonged to different species: "You were the first to demonstrate beyond question by your experience that man is man everywhere, that is, a kind, sociable being with whom communication can and should be established through kindness and truth, not guns and spirits."

=== Christian anarchism ===
Tolstoy had a profound influence on the development of Christian anarchist thought. Tolstoy believed being a Christian required him to be a pacifist; the apparently inevitable waging of war by governments is why he is considered a philosophical anarchist. The Tolstoyans were a small Christian anarchist group formed by Tolstoy's companion, Vladimir Chertkov (1854–1936), to spread Tolstoy's religious teachings. From 1892, he regularly met with the student-activist Vasily Maklakov who would defend several Tolstoyans; they discussed the fate of the Doukhobors. Philosopher Peter Kropotkin wrote of Tolstoy in the article on anarchism in the 1911 Encyclopædia Britannica:

Without naming himself an anarchist, Leo Tolstoy, like his predecessors in the popular religious movements of the 15th and 16th centuries, Chojecki, Denk and many others, took the anarchist position as regards the state and property rights, deducing his conclusions from the general spirit of the teachings of Jesus and from the necessary dictates of reason.

With all the might of his talent, Tolstoy made (especially in The Kingdom of God Is Within You) a powerful criticism of the church, the state and law altogether, and especially of the present property laws. He describes the state as the domination of the wicked ones, supported by brutal force. Robbers, he says, are far less dangerous than a well-organized government. He makes a searching criticism of the prejudices which are current now concerning the benefits conferred upon men by the church, the state, and the existing distribution of property, and from the teachings of Jesus he deduces the rule of nonresistance and the absolute condemnation of all wars.

His religious arguments are, however, so well combined with arguments borrowed from a dispassionate observation of the present evils, that the anarchist portions of his works appeal to the religious and the non-religious reader alike.

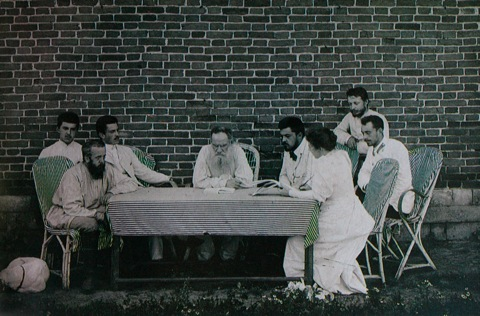
Tolstoy organising famine relief in Samara, 1891

Film by Aleksandr Osipovich Drankov of Tolstoy's 80th birthday (1908) at Yasnaya Polyana, showing his wife Sofya (picking flowers in the garden) daughter Aleksandra (sitting in the carriage in the white blouse); his aide and confidante V. Chertkov (bald man with the beard and mustache); and students.

In hundreds of essays over the last 20 years of his life, Tolstoy reiterated the anarchist critique of the state and recommended books by Kropotkin and Proudhon to his readers, while rejecting anarchism's espousal of violent revolutionary means. In the 1900 essay "On Anarchy" he wrote: "The Anarchists are right in everything; in the negation of the existing order, and in the assertion that, without Authority, there could not be worse violence than that of Authority under existing conditions. They are mistaken only in thinking that Anarchy can be instituted by a revolution. But it will be instituted only by there being more and more people who do not require the protection of governmental power ... There can be only one permanent revolution – a moral one: the regeneration of the inner man." Despite his misgivings about anarchist violence, Tolstoy took risks to circulate the prohibited publications of anarchist thinkers in Russia, and corrected the proofs of Kropotkin's "Words of a Rebel", illegally published in St Petersburg in 1906.

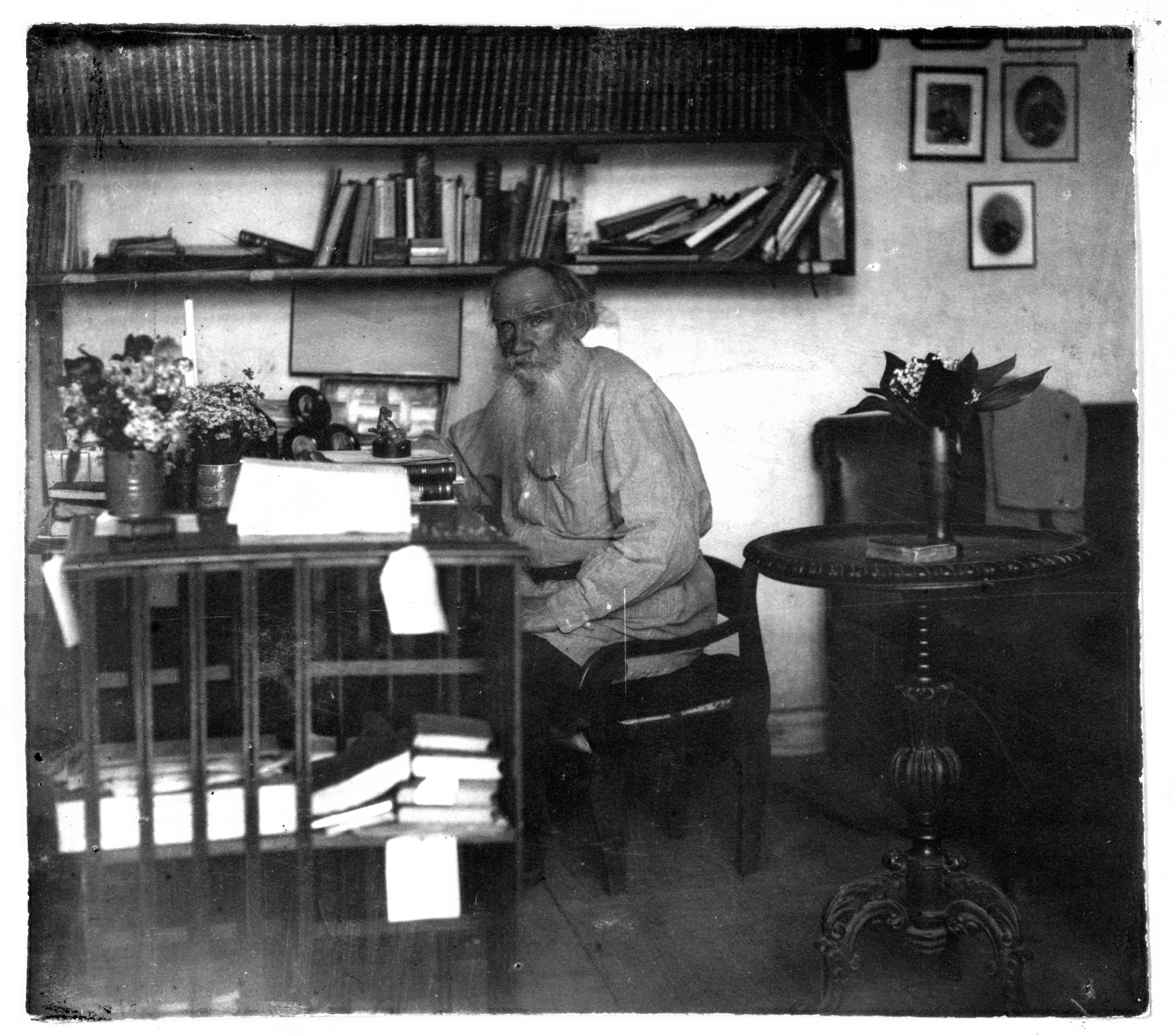
Tolstoy in his study in 1908 (age 80)

=== Pacificism ===
In 1908, Tolstoy wrote A Letter to a Hindu, outlining his belief in non-violence as a means for India to gain independence from colonial rule. In 1909, Gandhi read a copy of the letter when he was becoming an activist in South Africa. He wrote to Tolstoy seeking proof that he was the author, which led to further correspondence. Tolstoy's The Kingdom of God Is Within You also helped to convince Gandhi of nonviolent resistance, a debt Gandhi acknowledged in his autobiography, calling Tolstoy "the greatest apostle of non-violence that the present age has produced". Their correspondence lasted only a year, from October 1909 until Tolstoy's death in November 1910, but led Gandhi to give the name Tolstoy Colony to his second ashram in South Africa. Both men also believed in the merits of vegetarianism, the subject of several of Tolstoy's essays.

The Boxer Rebellion stirred Tolstoy's interest in Chinese philosophy. He was a famous sinophile, and read the works of Confucius and Laozi. Tolstoy wrote Chinese Wisdom and other texts about China. Tolstoy corresponded with the Chinese intellectual Gu Hongming and recommended that China remain an agrarian nation, and not reform as Japan had done. Tolstoy and Gu opposed the Hundred Days' Reform by Kang Youwei and believed that the reform movement was perilous. Tolstoy's ideology of non-violence shaped the thought of the Chinese anarchist group Society for the Study of Socialism.

Tolstoy denounced the intervention by the Eight-Nation Alliance (which included Russia) in the Boxer Rebellion in China, the Filipino-American War, and the Second Boer War. Tolstoy praised the Boxer Rebellion and harshly criticized the atrocities of the Russian, German, American, Japanese, and other troops of the Eight-Nation alliance. He heard about the looting, rapes, and murders, and accused the troops of slaughter and "Christian brutality". He named the monarchs most responsible for the atrocities as Tsar Nicholas II and Kaiser Wilhelm II, describing their intervention as "terrible for its injustice and cruelty". The war was also criticized by other intellectuals such as Leonid Andreyev and Gorky. As part of the criticism, Tolstoy wrote an epistle called To the Chinese people. In 1902, he wrote an open letter describing and denouncing Nicholas II's activities in China.

Tolstoy also became a major supporter of the Esperanto movement. He was impressed by the pacifist beliefs of the Doukhobors and brought their persecution to the attention of the international community, after they burned their weapons in peaceful protest in 1895. He aided the Doukhobors to migrate to Canada. He also provided inspiration to the Mennonites, another religious group with anti-government and anti-war sentiments. In 1904, Tolstoy condemned the ensuing Russo-Japanese War and wrote to the Japanese Buddhist priest Soyen Shaku in a failed attempt to make a joint pacifist statement.

=== Georgism ===
Towards the end of his life, Tolstoy became occupied with the economic theory and social philosophy of Georgism. He incorporated it approvingly into works such as Resurrection (1899), the book that was a major cause for his excommunication. He spoke with great admiration of Henry George, stating once that "People do not argue with the teaching of George; they simply do not know it. And it is impossible to do otherwise with his teaching, for he who becomes acquainted with it cannot but agree." He also wrote a preface to George's journal Social Problems. Tolstoy and George both rejected private property in land (the most important source of income for Russian aristocracy that Tolstoy heavily criticized). They also rejected a centrally planned economy.

Because Georgism requires an administration to collect land rent and spend it on infrastructure, some assume that this embrace moved Tolstoy away from his anarchist views; however, anarchist versions of Georgism have been proposed since then. Resurrection, in which the nobleman Dmitri Ivanovich Nekhlyudov realizes that the earth cannot really be owned and that everyone should have equal access to its resources and advantages, hints that Tolstoy had such a view. Other works, such as Tolstoy's unfinished play The Light that Shines in the Darkness and the short story "How Much Land Does a Man Need?”, suggest Tolstoy's approval of small communities with local governance to manage the collective land rents for common goods, and heavily criticize state institutions such as the justice system.

=== Hunting ===
Tolstoy was introduced to hunting by his father, who was an avid huntsman. He was trained to hunt from a young age and became a passionate huntsman himself. He was known to shoot duck, quail, snipe, woodcock and otters. For example, Tolstoy wrote in his diary on 23 March 1852, "the weather was marvellous; went out hunting, rode up and down the undulating country till one. Killed two ducks." His novel War and Peace includes hunting scenes. Tolstoy spent decades hunting, but stopped sometime in the 1880s and became a staunch opponent of hunting due to ethical concerns about killing. In 1890 Tolstoy wrote a preface for Vladimir Chertkov's anti-hunting pamphlet Zlaia zabava: Mysli ob okhote (An Evil Pastime: Thoughts about Hunting). Although Tolstoy in his later life opposed hunting, he never abandoned his love for horse-riding.

=== Vegetarianism ===
Tolstoy first became interested in vegetarianism in 1882; however, his conversion to a vegetarian diet was a long and gradual process. William Frey (Vladimir Konstantinovich Geins), who visited Tolstoy in Autumn 1885, influenced Tolstoy to become vegetarian. In 1887, Tolstoy was lapsing from a vegetarian diet by occasionally eating meat. It was only from 1890 that Tolstoy adopted a strict vegetarian diet which he was alleged to have never consciously betrayed. Tolstoy's wife Sophia argued that his vegetarian diet did not provide him enough nourishment and contributed to his digestive ailments, however, Tolstoy stated that his health was not deprived on the diet but had improved. Critics of Tolstoy such as I. S. Listovsky suggested that Tolstoy's writing talent went into decline after he adopted a meatless diet.

Tolstoy became a vegetarian for ethical and spiritual reasons, associating a meatless diet with "high moral views on life". He viewed both hunting and eating meat as a moral evil as they involve unnecessary cruelty to animals and regretted his former habits. In 1891, Tolstoy obtained a copy of Howard Williams's book The Ethics of Diet from Chertkov. His daughters translated the book into Russian and Tolstoy wrote an introductory essay titled "The First Step", published in 1893. In his introductory essay, he described a cruel experience he had witnessed at a visit to a slaughterhouse in Tula. The cruelty he had witnessed confirmed his belief that meat should be removed from the diet. In the essay he wrote that meat eating is "simply immoral, as it involves the performance of an act which is contrary to moral feeling – killing".

Whilst on his vegetarian diet, Tolstoy was eating eggs daily but was questioned by one of his friends if eating eggs amounts to taking life. He commented that "Yes, I ought to have stopped taking eggs. At least from now I shall stop it". By 1903, Tolstoy had removed eggs from his diet. Vasily Rozanov who had visited Tolstoy noted that vegetarianism was a way of living for Tolstoy and at the dinner table surrounded by family and guests who were eating meat and scrambled eggs, Tolstoy was eating kasha. In a letter to A. D. Zutphen (a Dutch medical student), Tolstoy wrote that "My health not only has not suffered; it has in fact improved significantly since I have given up milk, butter and eggs, as well as sugar, tea, and coffee." Tolstoy described his vegetarian diet consisting of oatmeal porridge, whole wheat bread, cabbage or potato soup, buckwheat, a boiled or fried potato and an apple prune compote.

== Death ==
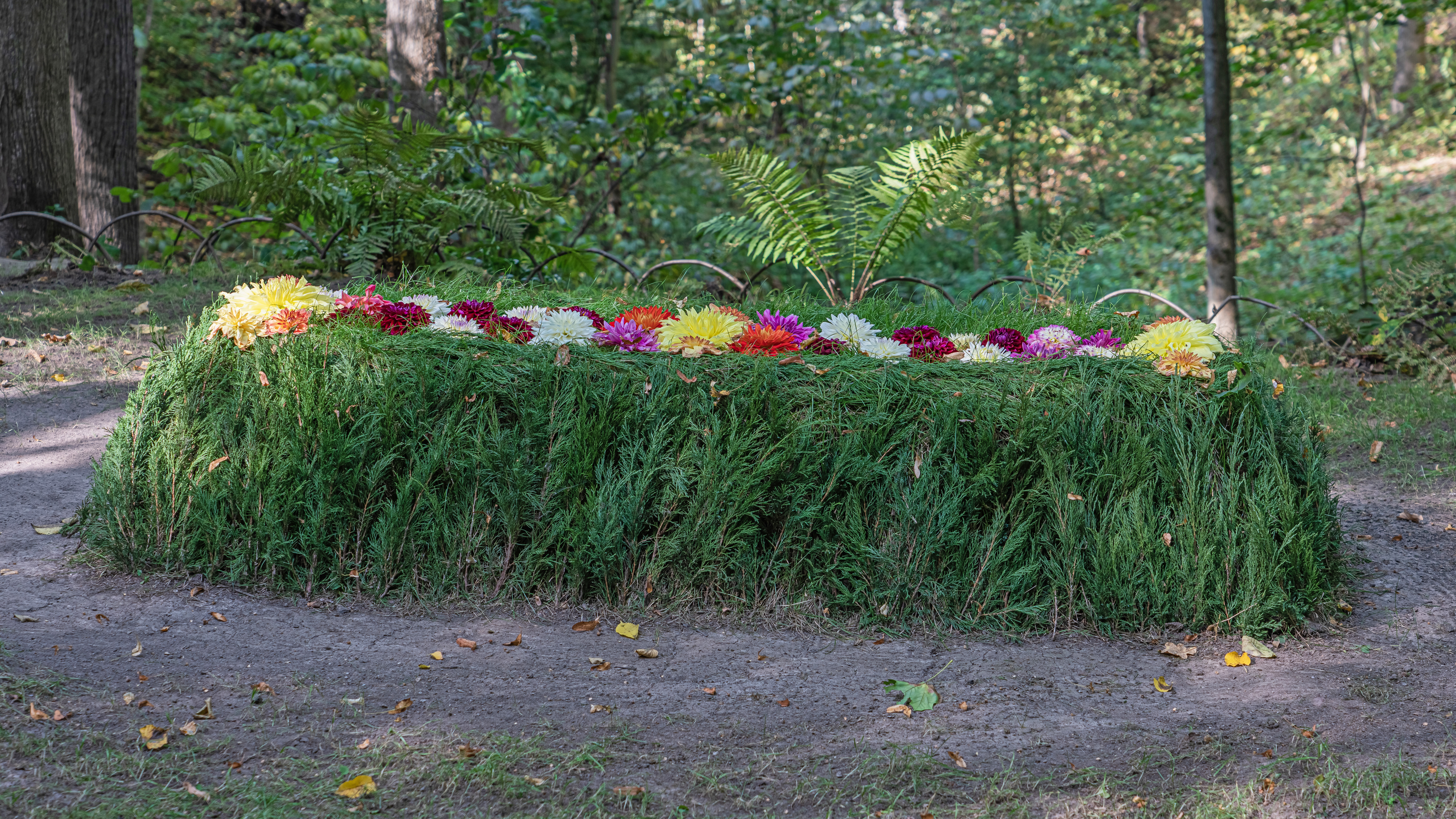
Tolstoy's grave with flowers at Yasnaya Polyana

Tolstoy died on 20 November 1910 at the age of 82 of pneumonia, at Astapovo railway station, after a day's train journey south. According to some sources, Tolstoy spent the last hours of his life preaching love, non-violence, and Georgism to fellow passengers on the train.

The stationmaster took Tolstoy to his apartment, and his personal doctors arrived and gave him injections of morphine and camphor.

During the funeral ceremonies the police took extra precautions to minimize dissent. They were inconspicuous but looming during the funeral itself, which two thousand people attended without incident. Three choirs sang. There were no eulogies, per the family's request, although 100 students had asked to speak.

== Legacy ==
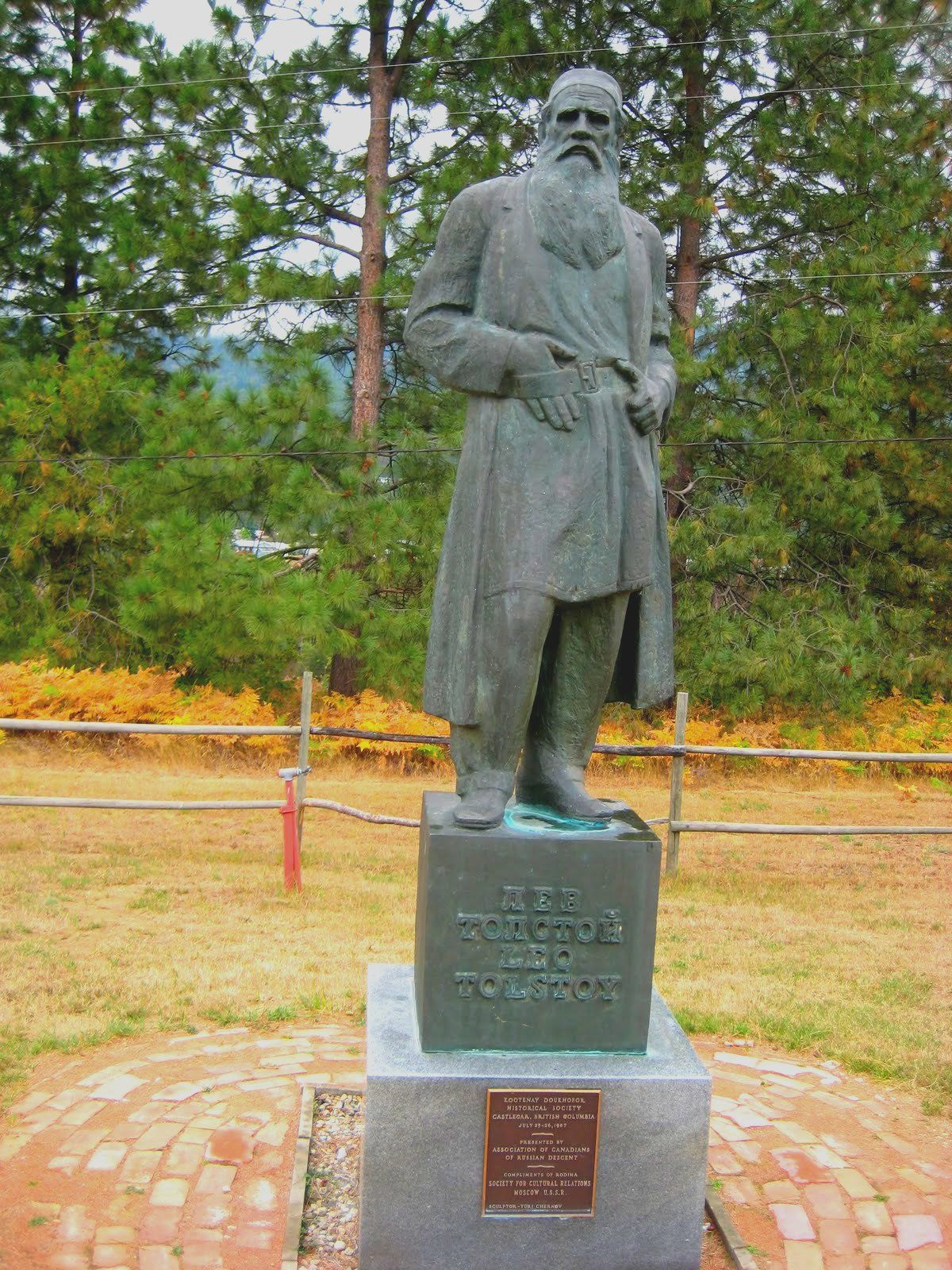
Statue of Tolstoy in Castlegar, British Columbia

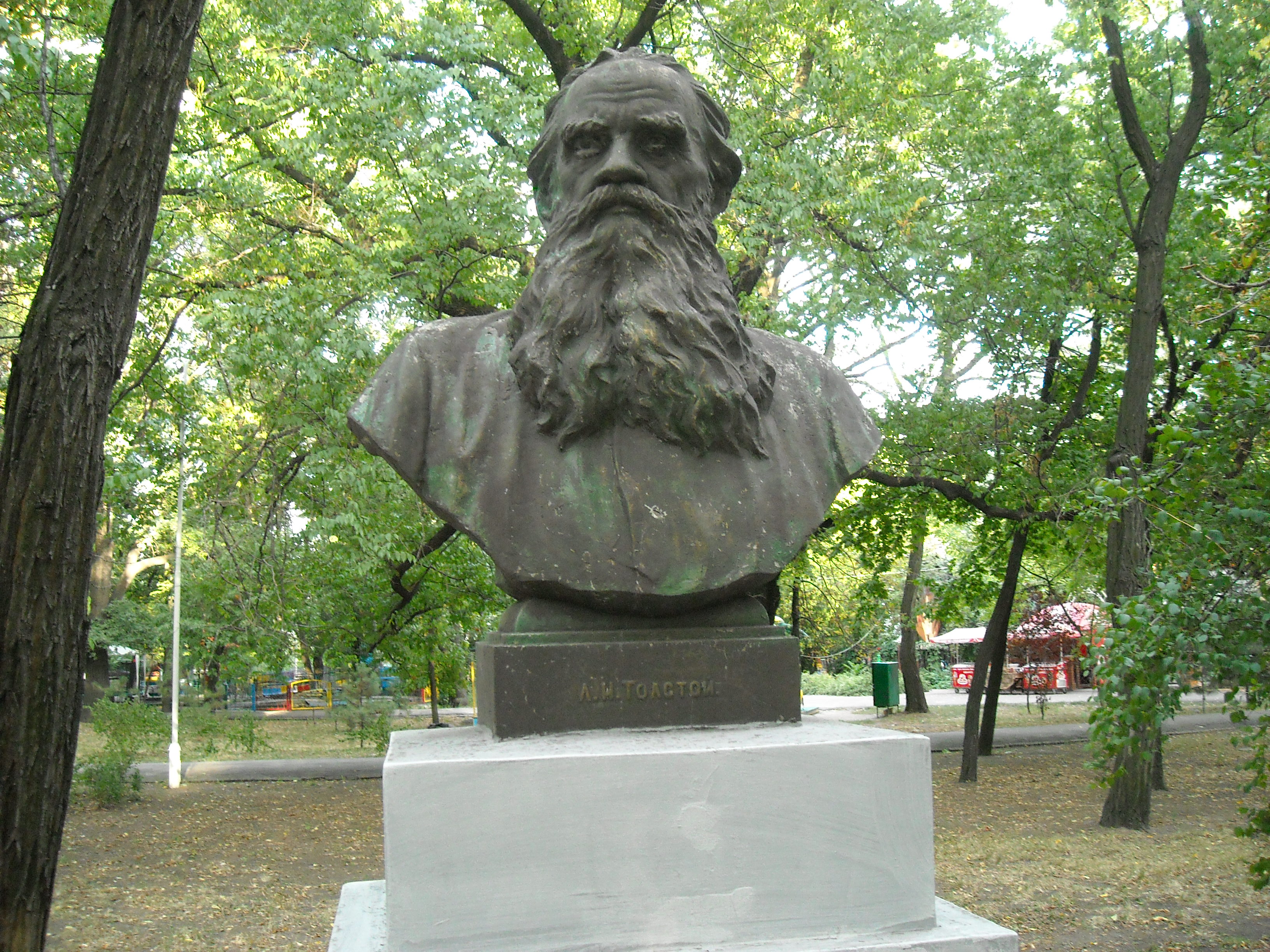
Bust of Tolstoy in Mariupol, Ukraine, 2011

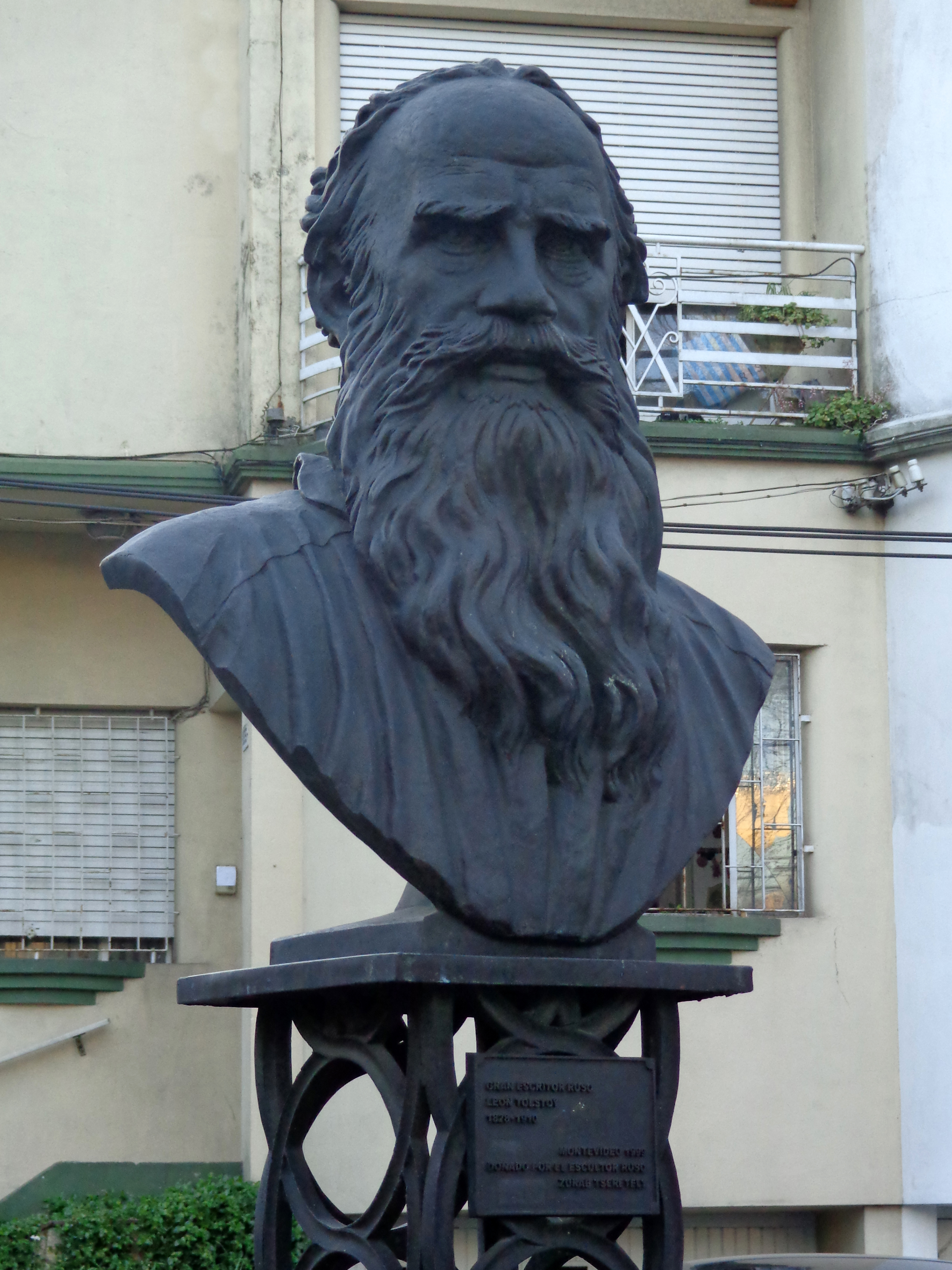
Bust of Tolstoy in Montevideo, Uruguay

Although Tolstoy was primarily regarded as a Christian anarchist, his ideas and works still influenced other socialist thinkers throughout history. He held an unromantic view of governments as being essentially violent forces held together by intimidation from state authority, corruption on behalf of officials, and the indoctrination of people from a young age. In regard to his view of economics, he advocated for a return to subsistence agriculture. In his view, a simplified economy would afford a lesser need for the exchange of goods, and as such, factories and cities – the centers of industry – would become obsolete.

In 1944, literary historian and Soviet medievalist Nikolai Gudzii wrote a biography of Tolstoy that spanned 80 pages. It was designed to show readers that Tolstoy would have revised his pacifistic and anti-patriotic sentiments if he were alive amid World War II. At around the same time, literary scholar and historian Boris Eikhenbaum – in a stark contrast from his earlier works on Tolstoy – portrayed the Russian novelist as someone whose ideas aligned with those of early utopian socialists, such as Robert Owen and Henri Saint-Simon. Eikenbaum suggested that these influences can be seen in Tolstoy's emphases on individual happiness and peasant welfare. The discrepancies in Eikenbaum's portrayals of Tolstoy can be attributed to the political pressure in the Soviet Union at the time, when public officials pressured literary scholars to conform with party doctrine.

Between 1902 and 1906, Tolstoy was nominated annually for the Nobel Prize in Literature, and received nominations for the Nobel Peace Prize in 1901, 1902, and 1909. The fact that he was never awarded either prize remains one of the most prominent Nobel Prize controversies, though in 1906 Tolstoy actively wrote to an acquaintance in Sweden asking to ensure he would not be chosen, as he wished to avoid receiving the prize money.

In 2001, Tolstoy's great-great-grandson Vladimir Tolstoy made an appeal to the Russian Orthodox Church to reconsider Tolstoy's excommunication. Despite his efforts, the status of the excommunication remained unchanged, with Orthodox priest Vsevolod Chaplin commenting that Tolstoy "expressed views contradicting the church's teaching and spirit, the church naturally had the right to say that these views could not be considered orthodox." Chaplin did however clarify that the excommunication "should not be taken as an anathema, but the attestation that the writer's beliefs very seriously disagreed with Orthodox teaching."

=== In the Soviet Union ===
From Tolstoy's writings the Tolstoyan movement was birthed, and its members used his works to promote non-violence, anti-urbanism and opposition to the state. While Tolstoy himself never associated with the movement, as he was opposed to joining any organization or group, he named his thirteenth child Alexandra (Sasha) L'vovna Tolstaya the heir to his works with the intention that she would publish them for the Russian people. Meanwhile, Tolstoy designated Vladimir Chertkov – who kept many of Tolstoy's manuscripts – as the editor of his works. Originally, Tolstoy wanted to make the Russian people the heirs to his writings; however, Russian law at the time decreed that property could only be inherited by one individual.

Following the Russian Civil War in 1917, writings that were formerly censored could now be published, since all literary works were nationalized in November 1918. Alexandra worked during these years to publish sets of Tolstoy's works, and she worked with Zadruga Publishing House from 1917 to 1919 to publish thirteen booklets on Tolstoy's writings, which had previously been censored under Russia's imperial rule; however, publishing a complete collection of Tolstoy's works proved to be more difficult. In December 1918, the Commissariat of Education granted Chertkov a 10 million rouble subsidy to publish a complete edition of his works, which never materialized due to government control of publication rights. Cooperatives were additionally made illegal in Russia in 1921, creating another obstacle for Alexandra and Chertkov.

In the 1920s, Tolstoy's estate, Yasnaya Polyana, was sanctioned by the Soviet state to exist as a commune for Tolstoyans. The government permitted this Christian-oriented community because they felt that religious sects like the Tolstoyans were models for the Russian peasantry. The Soviet government owned the estate, which was deemed a memorial for the late Russian writer, but Alexandra had jurisdiction over the education offered at Yasnaya Polyana. Unlike most Soviet schools, the schooling at Yasnaya Polyana did not offer militaristic training and did not teach atheism. Over time, though, local communists – as opposed to the state government, which financially supported the institution – often denounced the estate and called for frequent inspections. After 1928, a change in cultural policy in the Soviet regime led to a takeover of local institutions, including Tolstoy's estate. When Alexandra stepped down from her role as head of Yasnaya Poliana in 1929, the Commissariat of Education and Health took control.

In 1925, the Soviet government created its first Jubilee Committee to celebrate the centennial of Tolstoy's birth, which originally consisted of 13 members but grew to 38 members after a second committee formed in 1927. Alexandra was not content with the funds provided by the government and met with Stalin in June 1928. During the meeting, Stalin said the government could not provide the one million roubles requested by the committee; however, an agreement was reached with the State Publishing House in April 1928 for the publishing of a 92-volume collection of Tolstoy's works. During the Jubilee Celebration, Anatoly Luncharsky – the head of the People's Commissariat for Education – gave a speech in which he denied reports that claimed the Soviet government was hostile towards Tolstoy and his legacy. Instead of focusing on the aspects of Tolstoy's works that pitted him against the Soviet regime, he instead focused on the unifying aspects, such as Tolstoy's love for equality and labor as well as his disdain for the state and private property. More than 400 million copies of Tolstoy's works were printed in the Soviet Union, making him the best-selling author in the Soviet Union.

=== Influence ===
Vladimir Lenin wrote several essays about Tolstoy, suggesting that a contradiction exists within his critique of Russian society. According to Lenin, Tolstoy – who adored the peasantry and voiced their discontent with imperial Russian society – may have been revolutionary in his critiques but his political consciousness was not fully developed for a revolution. Lenin uses this line of thinking to suggest that the 1905 Russian Revolution, which he called a "peasant bourgeois revolution", failed because of its backwardness; the revolutionaries wanted to dismantle the existing medieval forms of oppression and replace them with an old and patriarchal village-commune. Additionally, Lenin thought Tolstoy's concept of nonresistance to evil hindered the 1905 revolution's success because the movement was not militant and had thus allowed the autocracy to crush them. Nevertheless, Lenin concludes in his writings that despite the many contradictions in Tolstoy's critiques, his hatred for feudalism and capitalism mark the prelude to proletarian socialism.

Tolstoy's philosophy of nonresistance to evil made an impact on Mahatma Gandhi's political thinking. Gandhi was deeply moved by Tolstoy's concept of truth, which, in his view, constitutes any doctrine that reduces suffering. For both Gandhi and Tolstoy, truth is God, and since God is universal love, truth must therefore also be universal love. The Gujarati word for Gandhi's non-violent movement is satyagraha, derived from the word sadagraha – the sat portion translating to "truth", and the agraha translating to "firmness". Gandhi's conception of satyagraha was birthed from Tolstoy's understanding of Christianity rather than from Hindu tradition.

=== In film and television ===
The Death of Ivan Ilyich was adapted by Akira Kurosawa as Ikiru (1952). It was also the basis for Living (2022), with a screenplay by Kazuo Ishiguro. In the George Lucas television show The Young Indiana Jones Chronicles, later retitled The Adventures of Young Indiana Jones, a fictional Tolstoy appears as a mentor figure and friend of Indiana Jones. In the made-for-TV movie Travels with Father (1996), he is portrayed by Michael Gough.

A 2009 film about Tolstoy's final year, The Last Station, based on the 1990 novel by Jay Parini, was made by director Michael Hoffman with Christopher Plummer as Tolstoy and Helen Mirren as Sofya Tolstaya. Both performers were nominated for Oscars for their roles. There have been other films about the writer, including Departure of a Grand Old Man, made in 1912 just two years after his death, How Fine, How Fresh the Roses Were (1913), and Lev Tolstoy, directed by and starring Sergei Gerasimov in 1984. There is also a famous lost film of Tolstoy made a decade before he died. In 1901, the American travel lecturer Burton Holmes visited Yasnaya Polyana with Albert J. Beveridge, the U.S. senator and historian. As the three men conversed, Holmes filmed Tolstoy with his 60 mm movie camera. Afterwards, Beveridge's advisers succeeded in having the film destroyed, fearing that the meeting with the Russian author might hurt Beveridge's chances of running for the U.S. presidency.

== See also ==
- Anarchism and religion
- Christian vegetarianism
- Leo Tolstoy and Theosophy
- List of peace activists
- Henry David Thoreau
- Tolstovka
- War & Peace (2016 TV series)
