= Childhood (Tolstoy novel) =

1852 novel by Leo Tolstoy

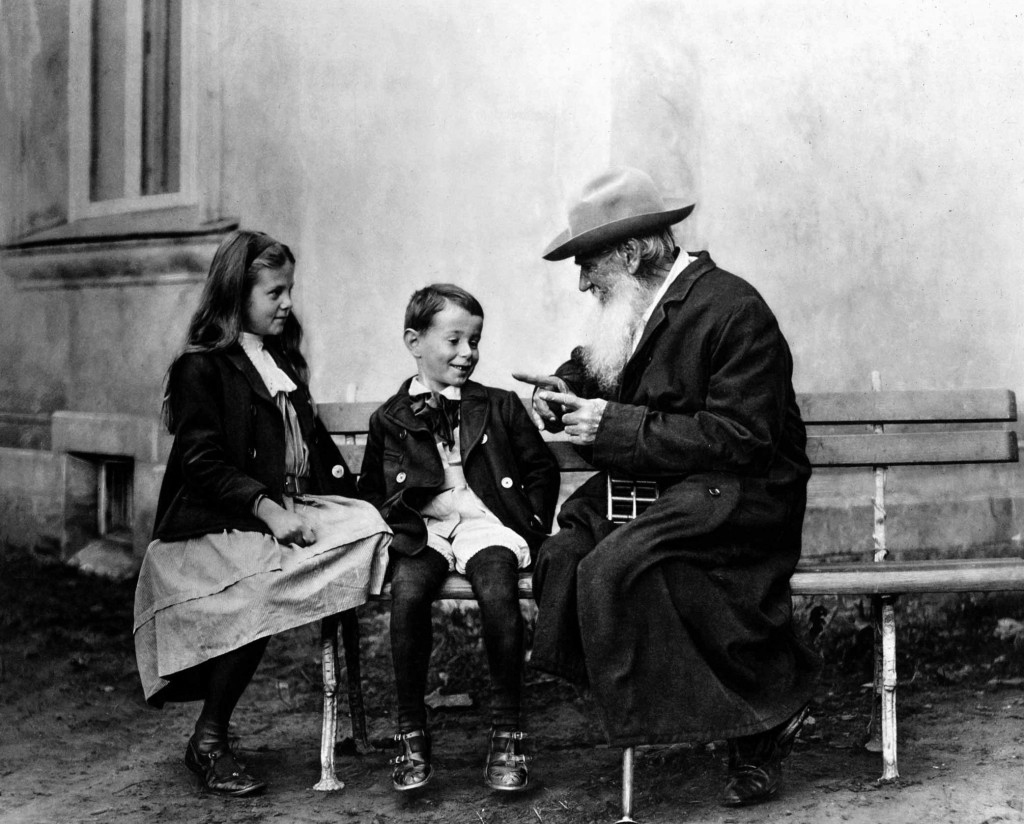
- Tolstoy and his grandchildren, c. 1909
- Author: Leo Tolstoy
- Original title: Дѣтство
- Translator: Dora O'Brien (2010)
- Language: Russian
- Publisher: Sovremennik
- Publication date: 1852
- Publication place: Russia
- Pages: 358 p. (Paperback)
- ISBN: 978-1-84749-142-8
- Followed by: Boyhood

Childhood (pre-reform Russian: Дѣтство; post-reform Russian: Детство, romanized: Détstvo) is the first published novel by Leo Tolstoy, released under the initials L. N. in the November 1852 issue of the popular Russian literary journal The Contemporary.

It is the first in a series of three novels, followed by Boyhood and Youth. Published when Tolstoy was just twenty-three years old, the book was an immediate success. It earned Tolstoy notice from other Russian novelists including Ivan Turgenev, who heralded the young Tolstoy as a major up-and-coming figure in Russian literature.

Childhood explores the inner life of a young boy, Nikolenka. It is one of the books in Russian writing to explore an expressionistic style, mixing fact, fiction, and emotions to render the moods and reactions of the narrator.

In autobiographical Childhood Tolstoy described his homosexual attraction. In the novel Tolstoy recalls how he was smitten by Sergey Ivin, “whose striking good looks had captivated me from the first, and I felt an irresistible attraction towards him. Only to see him filled me with pleasure […]. Awake or asleep, I was forever dreaming of him.” Nevertheless, he tells no one about his first love then—not even Sergius.

== Excerpt ==
"Will the freshness, lightheartedness, the need for love, and strength of faith which you have in childhood ever return? What better time than when the two best virtues -- innocent joy and the boundless desire for love -- were the only motives in life?"

== See also ==
- Leo Tolstoy bibliography
