= What Men Live By =

Short story by Leo Tolstoy

"What Men Live By" (also translated as "What People Live By") is a short story written by Russian author Leo Tolstoy in 1885. It is one of the short stories included in his collection What Men Live By, and Other Tales, published in 1885. The compilation also included the written pieces "The Three Questions", "The Coffee-House of Surat", and "How Much Land Does a Man Need?".

== Plot ==
Simon is a shoemaker who sets out one winter day to purchase sheepskins to make a warm coat for himself and his wife, Matryona. Normally, what little he earns is spent on food for his family. Hoping to afford the skins, he goes to collect a debt of roughly 5 rubles from his customers but manages to recover only 20 kopeks. Disheartened, he spends it on vodka and begins his journey home.

As he approaches a roadside chapel, Simon notices a pale figure leaning against the wall. Upon closer inspection, he sees that it is a naked man in apparent poor health. Simon passes by the man fearing he may be dangerous but is overcome with shame and returns to help. Simon gives him some of his own extra clothes, and supports him as they walk home together. The stranger speaks little, responding to Simon’s questions by saying, "I cannot tell," and "God has punished me."

When Matryona sees Simon arrive with the stranger, she is angry, saying she is not even sure whether they have food for the next day. As the tension subsides, she invites the stranger to eat. As they eat together, pity softens her expression. At that moment, the stranger’s grim face brightens, and he smiles briefly. The next morning, Simon learns that his name is Michael. Simon offers him shelter on the condition that he work as his assistant. Michael agrees and remains with them for several years. He learns very quickly, with his skill and diligence bringing modest prosperity to Simon’s shoemaking business.

One winter day, a nobleman visits the shop and orders a pair of boots that must last for a year, threatening Simon with punishment if they fail. Michael stares past the nobleman’s shoulder and smiles for the second time. Instead of boots, Michael makes soft slippers from the quality leather they were given for it. Simon is horrified, but before he can protest, a messenger arrives to report that the nobleman has died and requests slippers for his burial. Simon watches in astonishment as Michael hands over the finished pair.

On his sixth year with them, a woman arrives with two young twin girls, one of whom is crippled. She orders shoes for them, including a separate one for the lame foot. When Simon asks about the twins, the woman explains that they are not her own. Their mother had died shortly after childbirth and her corpse had crushed the infant’s leg, leaving the girl lame. The woman adopted the twins out of compassion. On hearing this, Michael smiles for the third time.

After the woman leaves, Michael bids Simon and Matryona farewell, thanking them and saying that God has forgiven him. A radiant light surrounds him, and they realize that he is not an ordinary man. Simon asks him why did he smile only on those three occasions living with them. Michael explains that he is an angel who had once been tasked to take the soul of the same woman who died giving birth. When she pleaded for her life, fearing for her children, Michael spared her. As punishment, God sent him back to fetch her soul, commanding him to learn three truths before he could return to heaven: what lives in man, what is not given to man, and what men live by.

Michael says that he learned the first truth, that love lives in man, when Matryona showed him compassion. He learned the second truth, that man is not given knowledge of his own needs, when the nobleman prepared for a future he would never live to see, as Michael noticed the angel of death looming over him. He learned the third truth, that men live not by care for themselves, but by love, when he saw the woman’s selfless adoption of the orphaned twins. Having learned these truths, Michael ascends to heaven.

== Influence ==
It was turned into a short British film in 1938 directed by Vernon Sewell. Soviet-Russian author Aleksandr Solzhenitsyn refers to the story in his 1966 book Cancer Ward.

== See also ==
- Bibliography of Leo Tolstoy
- Twenty-Three Tales
