= The Prisoner of the Caucasus (story) =

1872 novella written by Leo Tolstoy

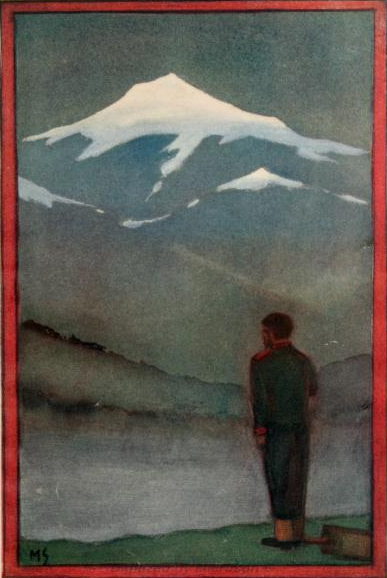
An illustration by Michael Sevier, 1916

The Prisoner of the Caucasus (or A Prisoner in the Caucasus; Russian: Кавказский пленник, romanized: Kavkazsky plennik) is an 1872 novella written by Leo Tolstoy for his ABC book. The story, originally intended for rural children, is written in simplified language. It was inspired by an incident from the Caucasian War that had happened to Tolstoy himself in June 1853 near Grozny. The title contains an allusion to the 1821 poem by Pushkin. It is included in the English-language compilation Twenty-Three Tales.

== Plot ==
The story is about two Russian soldiers kidnapped by the mountaineers for ransom and about the long months they spent in custody in a remote aul. They tried to escape twice, were caught the first time, but succeeded the second.

Tolstoy's brother-in-law recounted the 1853 incident in the following words:

The peaceful Chechen Sodo, who was riding with Leo, was his devoted friend. A short time before, they had exchanged horses. Sodo had purchased a young steed, and having tried her, yielded her to his friend Leo, while he himself mounted Leo’s pacer, which, as was well known, could not gallop. In this manner they were overtaken by the militant Chechens. Leo, though he might easily have escaped upon his friend’s swift horse, would not forsake him. Sodo, like all the mountaineers, never parted from his rifle; but, as ill fortune would have it, it was not loaded. Nevertheless, he levelled it at the pursuers and shouted threats at them. Judging by their conduct, the pursuers evidently intended to take them both alive — Sodo especially, for vengeance — and therefore refrained from firing. This circumstance saved them. They succeeded in approaching the fortress of Grozny, where a vigilant sentry, discerning the chase from afar, gave the alarm. The Cossacks who rode out to meet them compelled the Chechens to abandon the pursuit.

== Importance ==
After his religious conversion, Tolstoy declared (in his treatise What Is Art?) this novella to be his greatest artistic achievement (along with his story God Sees the Truth, But Waits).

In Russia, The Prisoner of the Caucasus is one of Tolstoy’s best known works, included in the school curriculum since Soviet times. The 1996 Russian film Prisoner of the Mountains incorporates some plot details from Tolstoy's story, with action moved to the First Chechen War in the 1990s.

== See also ==
- Bibliography of Leo Tolstoy
