= God Sees the Truth, But Waits =

- Short story by Leo Tolstoy
- Country: Russia
- Language: Russian
- Genre: short story

Publication
- Published in: 1872

Audiobook version of God Sees the Truth, But Waits by Leo Tolstoy

"God Sees the Truth, But Waits" (Russian: "Бог правду видит, да не скоро скажет", "Bog pravdu vidit da ne skoro skazhet", sometimes translated as Exiled to Siberia and The Long Exile) is a short story by Russian author Leo Tolstoy first published in 1872.

The story, about a man sent to prison for a murder he did not commit, takes the form of a parable of forgiveness. English translations were also published under titles "The Confessed Crime", "Exiled to Siberia", and "The Long Exile". The concept of the story of a man wrongfully accused of murder and banished to Siberia also appears in one of Tolstoy's previous works, War and Peace, during a philosophical discussion between two characters who relate the story and argue how the protagonist of their story deals with injustice and fate. Along with his novella The Prisoner of the Caucasus, Tolstoy personally considered this short story to be his only great artistic achievement.

== Summary ==
In the Russian town of Vladimir, Ivan Dmitrich Aksionov lives as a successful merchant with his wife and young children. One summer, as Aksionov sets off for Nizhny Fair to sell his goods, Aksionov's wife warns him not to go, for she has had a nightmare in which he returned with grey hair. Aksionov laughs off her concern that the nightmare was a premonition and interprets the dream as a sign of luck.

Halfway to the town, Aksionov encounters a fellow merchant, whom he befriends. The two stop for the night at an inn, where they have tea together and sleep in adjoining rooms. Aksionov rises before dawn and sets off with his horses and coachman while the air is cool. After twenty-five miles, he stops to feed his horses.

During this break, two soldiers, accompanied by an official, arrive and question Aksionov about his relationship with the merchant he met the previous night, before revealing to him that the merchant was found dead with his throat slit. Since the two rooms were next to each other, it seems only natural that Aksionov might know something. Aksionov trembles in fear when the official searches his belongings and removes a bloodstained knife.

The men bind and arrest Aksionov. His wife visits him in jail and faints at the sight of him dressed as a criminal. He says they must petition the czar, to which she says she has already tried to no avail. She asks him if he committed the murder, and Aksionov weeps. If even his wife suspects him, he thinks after she leaves, then only God knows the truth and it is only to God that he should appeal.

He puts his faith in God and accepts his sentencing and ceremonial flogging. He is sent to work in the Siberian mines. Over twenty-six years in Siberia, Aksionov transforms into a pious old man. His hair turns white, his beard grows long, he walks with difficulty, and he never laughs. He prays often and, among other prisoners, he develops a reputation as a meek and fair man.

One day a newly arrived inmate named Makar Semyonich, who is about the same age as Aksionov and from the same hometown, gives an account of what brought him to Siberia. He was suspected of stealing a horse when in reality he had only borrowed it. Nevertheless, he was convicted and imprisoned. The irony is that he had gotten away with doing something much worse earlier in his life.

Aksionov suspects the man is responsible for framing him. He questions Semyonich, who cryptically responds in a way that confirms Aksionov's suspicion. Aksionov remembers everything he has lost and is plunged into misery; he longs for a way to get revenge but resolves to stay away from the man or even look in his direction. After two weeks, unable to sleep, Aksionov strolls the prison when he discovers Semyonich digging a tunnel under his sleeping shelf. Semyonich angrily offers Aksionov escape and threatens to kill him should he tell the authorities about the tunnel. Aksionov says Semyonich has already taken his life, and he shall do as God directs him.

Soldiers discover the tunnel the next day. The governor arrives to question prisoners, none of whom admit to knowing anything about the tunnel. After wrestling with his desire for vengeance, Aksionov declines to say what he knows about Semyonich's involvement, even if it means that he will be punished himself.

That night, Aksionov is about to nod off in his bunk when Semyonich sits down beside him. Semyonich bends over and whispers a plea for forgiveness. He confesses that it was he who killed the other merchant and stole his money; he then planted the knife so that Aksionov would become the suspect. He falls to his knees and begs for forgiveness, promising to confess to the crimes so that Aksionov will go free. The old man replies that his life is already over and he has nowhere to go.

At the sight of Semyonich's tears, Aksionov weeps himself. Semyonich begs again for forgiveness. Aksionov tells him that God will forgive him, and that perhaps he himself is a hundred times worse. Having said this, Aksionov feels a lightness enter his body. He no longer desires to go home or leave the prison; he wants only to die.

Semyonich confesses to the governor and the officials arrange Aksionov's release and acquittal. However, Aksionov passes away in peace before the order is executed.

== Adaptations ==
It was adapted into the Indian television series Katha Sagar (1986), directed by Shyam Benegal.

It was adapted into a CBS Radio Mystery Theatre program All Things Are Possible (1978), directed by Himan Brown.

Stephen King's novella Rita Hayworth and Shawshank Redemption was widely thought to be based on Tolstoy's short story "God Sees The Truth, But Waits", which Stephen King has disavowed. It was adapted into a feature film, The Shawshank Redemption (1994), starring Tim Robbins and Morgan Freeman.

"God Sees the Truth, But Waits" also inspired the 2016 Filipino film The Woman Who Left.

== See also ==
- Bibliography of Leo Tolstoy
- Twenty-Three Tales
