= The Three Hermits =

- Short story by Leo Tolstoy
- Original title: Три Старца
- Country: Russia
- Language: Russian
- Genre: Parable

Publication
- Published in: Niva
- Publication type: Magazine
- Media type: Print
- Publication date: 1886
- Published in English: 1907

"The Three Hermits" (Russian: Три Старца) is a short story by Russian author Leo Tolstoy (Lev Nikolayevich Tolstoy) written in 1885 and first published in 1886 in the weekly periodical Niva (нива). It appeared in the short-story collection Twenty-Three Tales which was first translated into English for an edition released by Funk & Wagnalls in 1907. The title refers to its three central characters; unnamed simple monks living on a remote island in a life of prayer and contemplation "for the salvation of their souls."

== Plot ==
A bishop and several pilgrims are travelling on a fishing boat from Archangel to the Solovétsk Monastery. During the voyage, the bishop overhears a discussion about a remote island, nearby their course, where three old hermits live a spartan existence focused on seeking "salvation for their souls." Inquiring about the hermits, the bishop finds that several of the fishermen claim to have seen the hermits once.

The bishop then informs the captain that he wishes to visit the island. The captain seeks to dissuade him by saying, "the old men are not worth your pains. I have heard say that they are foolish old fellows, who understand nothing, and never speak a word." The bishop insists and the captain steers the ship toward the island. The bishop subsequently sets off in a rowboat to visit. He is met ashore by the three hermits.

The bishop informs the hermits that he has heard of them and of their search for salvation. He inquires how they are seeking salvation and serving God, but the hermits say they do not know how, only that they pray, simply: "Three are you, three are we, have mercy upon us." Subsequently, the bishop acknowledges that they have a little knowledge but are ignorant of the true meaning of the doctrine and how to pray properly. He tells them that he will teach them "not a way of my own, but the way in which God in the Holy Scriptures has commanded all men to pray to Him" and proceeds to explain the doctrines of the incarnation and the Trinity. He attempts to teach them the Lord's Prayer, the "Our Father", but the simple hermits blunder and cannot remember the words. This compels the bishop to repeat the lesson late into the night. After he is satisfied that they have memorized the prayer, the bishop departs from the island leaving the hermits with a firm instruction to pray as he has taught them. The bishop then returns to the fisherman's vessel anchored offshore in the rowboat and continues his voyage.

While on board, the bishop notices that their vessel is being followed. At first, he thinks a boat is behind them, but he soon realizes that the three hermits are running across the surface of the water "as though it were dry land." The hermits catch up to the vessel as the captain stops the boat, and inform the bishop, "We have forgotten your teaching, servant of God. As long as we kept repeating it we remembered, but when we stopped saying it for a time, a word dropped out, and now it has all gone to pieces. We can remember nothing of it. Teach us again." The bishop is humbled and replies to the hermits, "Your own prayer will reach the Lord, men of God. It is not for me to teach you. Pray for us sinners." After this the hermits turn around and walk back to their island.

== Major themes ==
Tolstoy explores the nature of prayer by contrasting the simple, faithful but unknowing prayer of the illiterate hermits with the formal, doctrinal prayer of the educated bishop who is critical of the hermits' practice. Tolstoy prefaces this story with an epigraph from the sixth chapter of the Gospel of Saint Matthew: "And in praying use not vain repetitions, as the Gentiles do: for they think that they shall be heard for their much speaking. Be not therefore like unto them: for your Father knoweth what things ye have need of, before ye ask Him."

The hermits appear to "pray without ceasing" and their simple one-line prayer a paraphrase of the one-line Jesus Prayer that is popular in the Orthodox faith.

== Adaptation ==
- The episode "Teen Sadhu" by Satyen Bose, is an adaptation in the 1986 Indian anthology series Katha Sagar.
- American composer Stephen Paulus (1949–2014) adapted Tolstoy's short story into an opera, entitled The Three Hermits (1997).
- Ukrainian-American composer Paul Stetsenko (born 1962) wrote the children's church opera "The Three Hermits." Libretto by Tandy Martin and Paul Stetsenko, based on Tolstoy's story. Available at The Choral Public Domain Library (CPDL)

== See also ==
- Bibliography of Leo Tolstoy
- Twenty-Three Tales
