= Promoting a Devil =

Promoting a Devil (Russian: "Как чертенок краюшку выкупал", also translated as The Imp and the Crust) is a short story by Russian author Leo Tolstoy first published in 1886. (Tolstoy used the same plot for a play titled The First Distiller written later in the same year). It is a cautionary tale story about a man who fell into a sinful life when he was given more than he needed.

== Synopsis ==
The story opens with a peasant preparing to plow a field. Having gone without breakfast, he is careful to hide his dinner, a small crust of bread, under his coat. After plowing the field the peasant is hungry and ready for his dinner, but when he picks up his coat he sees that the bread is gone. It had been taken by a little devil, who was convinced that the peasant would become wrathful. Instead, the peasant decided that whoever took his bread must have needed it more than him, and he went on his way.

The little devil is brought before the Chief Devil, who is not pleased that the peasant was not corrupted. He threatens to douse the little devil with holy water if he fails again, and the little devil is sent out for another attempt at corrupting the peasant.

The little devil takes the guise of a pilgrim, and in this guise he gives the peasant farming advice throughout the seasons. The peasant grows a great surplus, and he begins to live much better than he had. One season, the little devil convinced the peasant to distill his extra corn into vodka, and the peasant takes his advice. The little devil then brings the Chief Devil to see the result of his works.

The devils witness a party hosted by the peasant, where all of the guests and the host himself indulge in several glasses of vodka. They start off joking and jovial, but as they consume more vodka, the party goers become more abusive and irate. When they finally leave the party they are thoroughly drunk, falling over each other and landing in the mud.

The Chief Devil is astonished. He is convinced that the drink must have been made from the blood of beasts to make the men act so beastly. The little devil explains that it was simply vodka, and he just needed to convince the peasant to turn God's gift of corn into idle liquor. The little devil knew that all men have a savage side inside of them, and when the peasant had just enough food to survive, the savage beast inside him was kept silent. But as soon as the peasant accumulates a surplus, corruption sets in. Convinced that the corruption of the peasants is complete, the Chief Devil awards the little devil a promotion.

== See also ==
- Bibliography of Leo Tolstoy
- Twenty-Three Tales
