= Wisdom of Children =

- Short story by Leo Tolstoy
- Original title: Маленькие дети
- Country: Russia
- Language: Russian
- Genres: Parable, Short story

Publication
- Media type: Print
- Publication date: 1885

"Wisdom of Children" (Russian: "Девчонки умнее стариков", also translated as Little Girls Wiser than Men) is a short story by Russian author Leo Tolstoy first published in 1885. It takes the form of a parable about forgiveness.

== Synopsis ==
The story opens at the beginning of Holy Week, when there is still melting snow on the ground. An older girl, Akulya, and a younger girl, Malasha, go outside to play. They both have just been given new frocks, but they insist on wading through one of the puddles from the melting snow. They both take off their shoes to keep them dry, and Akulya warns Malasha against splashing the water on her new frock. Malasha splashes Akulya despite her warning, and Akulya runs home in tears. Her mother is furious at the ruined frock, and she spanks Malasha in the middle of the street. Soon Malasha's mother emerges from her home, and the mothers begin arguing. The shouts brought the peasants into the street, who also began arguing with each other. The peasants start pushing each other, and Akulya's grandmother urges everyone to stop, but to no avail.

In the meantime, Akulya had washed off her frock, and she and Malasha returned to the pool. The two girls make a small boat out of bark, and they make a stream from the puddle. They go chasing after the boat together, as happy as ever. Akulya's grandmother urges everyone to follow the example of the children, and take their spirit of forgiveness into their own hearts.

== See also ==
- Bibliography of Leo Tolstoy
- Twenty-Three Tales
