= Where Love Is, God Is =

1885 short story by Leo Tolstoy

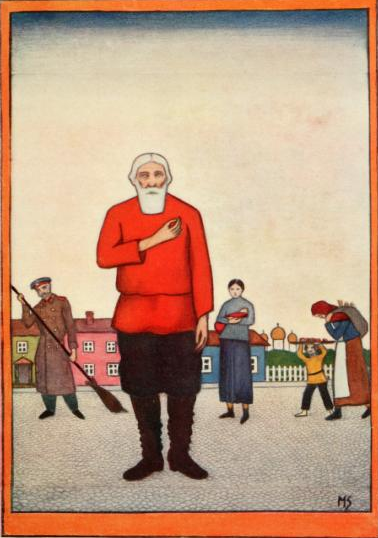
Tolstoi for the Young, translated by Mrs. R. S. Townsend (1916)

"Where Love Is, God Is" (sometimes also translated as "Where Love Is, There God Is Also" or "Martin the Cobbler") is a short story by Russian author Leo Tolstoy. The title references the Catholic hymn Ubi Caritas. One English translation of this short story as translated by Nathan Haskell Dole uses the alternate title translation of "Where Love Is, There God Is Also". It was published in the United States under Crowell Company's "Worth While Booklet" Series. It was written in 1885.

== Summary ==
"Where Love Is, God Is" is a short story about a shoemaker named Martin Avdeitch. The story begins with a background on Martin's life. He was a fine cobbler as he did his work well and never promised to do anything that he could not do. He stayed busy with his work in his basement which had only one window. Through this window he could see only the feet of people. He was still able to recognize most people by their shoes as he had worked with most of the shoes at least once. He had a wife, but she died, and all their children had died in their infancy except a three-year-old son.

After he thought about sending him off to live with his sister he decided to care for the child himself. Martin however, was not destined to have a child as his son died a few years later with a fever. In grief, he denied God, wondering how He could allow such a thing to happen to him. One day a missionary visited Martin and Martin told him of his hardships. This missionary told Martin that he should live his life for God and not deny Him because God's will is the ultimate deciding factor and as humans we cannot question that. The missionary's words sank deep into Martin. After this encounter Martin went out and bought a large print Testament.

He began to read the Bible, at first only on holidays, but as he read more and more it became daily. His life became full with peace and joy. After his day of work he would sit down with a lamp and read. One night Martin read a passage about a Pharisee who had invited Jesus into his house, and in the house a woman anointed and washed Jesus' feet with her tears. Martin thought of himself as the Pharisee in that story as he was only living for himself. As Martin slept he thought he heard the voice of God telling him that He would visit him the next day.

The next morning Martin skeptically watched out his window for God. While he was searching for God he saw Stepanitch shoveling away snow. Martin invited him in for a warm drink and they talked for a while. Martin told Stepanitch about Jesus and the Pharisee and Stepanitch was moved to tears. Stepanitch later left and thanked Martin for the food, both for the soul and body.

Martin later saw a young woman outside with a baby not properly dressed for the cold. He invited her in for some food and gave her warmer clothes and money. Martin also told her about Jesus and she thanked him and left. Then he saw a young boy stealing from an older lady. He went outside and settled their argument as he extended love and compassion towards the both of them.

That night while Martin wondered why God had not visited him, the three figures appeared in his home, whom he had shown hospitality to that day. They said that when he helped them he was helping God. Martin then realized that God had indeed visited him, and he accepted Him well.

== Adaptations ==
The Czech composer Bohuslav Martinů based a short opera on this story; however, he used the title of another story by Tolstoi, "What Men Live By". Libretto of this opera-pastoral in one act (1952) was written by the composer.

The story was made into a 1977 claymation special, Martin the Cobbler, animated by Will Vinton. Vinton's recreation was a faithful adaptation of the written word to claymation, with the exception that the narrator was much more quiet and the characters were given greater realm to express themselves. The special was introduced and narrated by Tolstoy's daughter, Alexandra Tolstaya

The children's book, Papa Panov's Special Day, by Mig Holder, is a retelling of the story.

It was adapted into "Pratiksha" an episode from the Indian television series, Katha Sagar (1986).

The Christmas Guest, a holiday poem written and recorded by Grandpa Jones and later recorded by Johnny Cash and Reba McEntire, is based on this story.

A Haitian Creole translation was produced by Haitian author, Carrié Paultre, published by the Presse Evangélique and the University of Kansas (Bryant C. Freeman).

Shoemaker Martin (1997), a children's book by Brigitte Hanhart, is based on this story.

It was adapted into a made-for-TV movie, Winter Thaw (2016) for BYUTV, starring John Rhys-Davies, and filmed in Lithuania. The film was produced by Utah-based Kaleidoscope Pictures. The film was directed by Adam Thomas Anderegg and Produced by Russ Kendall. Screenplay by Joseph Clay and Russ Kendall. It was screened on BYU TV and can be viewed on demand. It received an Emmy Award in 2017.

== See also ==
- Bibliography of Leo Tolstoy
- Twenty-Three Tales
