= The Empty Drum =

Short story by Leo Tolstoy

"The Empty Drum: A Russian Folk Tale Retold by Leo Tolstoy" ("Работник Емельян и пустой барабан") is a short story by Leo Tolstoy published in 1891. According to Aylmer Maude, famous Tolstoy translator, it was originally written in 1887, and is based on a folk story that reflects the Russian peasant's deep hatred of military service. It is based specifically on a folktale from the Volga region.

== Plot ==
According to an anniversary collection of Tolstoy's work published by Cambridge University Press, in this story, the hero, Emelyan (sometimes translated as "Yemilyan", "Emelyàn", or "Emelian"), rings the war drum, which is used to summon the soldiers of the tsar to the battlefield, and once the soldiers are assembled, he smashes the drum, releasing the power of the tsar over the people.

== Publication ==
It was translated to English by Leo Wiener and published in 1904, republished in 1999 in "Tolstoy: Tales of Courage and Conflict", and again in 2009 in "Leo Tolstoy's 20 Greatest Short Stories".

== Legacy ==
This work is cited as the inspiration for the 1928, Chinese literary anthology, named 空大鼓 ("Kong Dragu", or "Empty Drum").

== See also ==
- Bibliography of Leo Tolstoy
- Twenty-Three Tales
