= The Godson (short story) =

Short story by Leo Tolstoy

"The Godson" ("Крестник"; Romanized as "Krestnik") is a short story by Leo Tolstoy published in 1886. Inessa Medzhibovskaya, professor of English at New School for Social Research, describes the short story as the tale of a godson who is forbidden to open a certain sealed room in his godfather's palace, but then opens it and is banished, leading to his need for redemption.

== Plot ==
After the birth of his son, a poor peasant went door to door to look for someone to be his godfather. But due to his poverty, he was continually rejected until one day, as he was on his way to another village to find someone, he met a man who accepted the offer. The man, overjoyed, forgot to ask him where he lived before he disappeared.

His son grew up to be bright and hardworking, and at the age of 10 he took it upon himself to discover where his godfather lived in order to give him his Easter blessings. On his way to another village, he came upon his godfather, who revealed to him that he lived in a house with a golden roof deep in a forest far from the village.

And so the godson went to find his godfather, and following his directions, he came upon a scene of a bear with cubs attempting to feed on a pot of honey. The pot was placed under a large tree, where a log was suspended on one of its branches (acting as a 'swing' almost). As the family approached, a cub bumped into the log. The sow pushed the log back to move it out of the way, only to have it swing back and bruise a cub. The sow pushed the log back with greater force in annoyance, only to have it swing down even harder, hitting a cub on the head and killing it. In anger, the sow pushed the log with great force, before proceeding to feed on the pot of honey. But this time the log was pushed upwards until the string holding it to the branch slackened, and it fell vertically downward on the sow's head, killing the oblivious animal instantly. Disturbed by the scene, the man went on and soon came upon his godfather's house - a palace with a luxurious garden and a golden roof.

== Interpretation ==
=== Pacifism ===
According to psychologist Anatol Rapoport, the work has been considered inspirational to the Pacifism movement, due to a sub-plot where a robber is killed and the killer then must take on all the sins and transgressions of the robber, who had been absolved by his own murder. According to Ernest A. Baker, a literary critic in the early 1900s, this is another brilliant, moral tale of Tolstoy's, which teaches the uselessness in trying to correct evil.

=== As a moral story ===
According to famed Tolstoy translator Aylmer Maude, who had interviewed Tolstoy, this is a work that relies on "Divine interference in mundane affairs," which strays from "Tolstoy's usually rational outlook on life." According to the Cambridge Companion on Tolstoy, this was actually a story that was meant just to formally present and teach simple morals. According to Ernest Joseph Simmons, a contemporary literary critic, the main message to take away from this story is that one should care for others more than one's self.

== Publication history ==
According to a work edited by Andrew Donskov and dealing with Tolstoy, the Tsarist Censorship Board had examined the work for more than seven months, finally conclude with rejecting it for publication in November, 1886.

The story is included in numerous Tolstoy collections, such as "Where Love is God Is, and Other Stories" (1897), "Twenty Three Tales" (1924), and "Tolstoy: Tales of Courage and Conflict" (2009).

== See also ==
- Bibliography of Leo Tolstoy
- Twenty-Three Tales
