= Work, Death, and Sickness =

Short story by Leo Tolstoy

"Work, Death, and Sickness", sometimes also translated as "The Right Way", is a short story by Russian author Leo Tolstoy written in 1903. The story takes the form of a parable about the creation of work, death, and sickness.

== Synopsis ==
When God first created man, he had no need to work, and he would always live to be exactly one hundred years old. God thought that this would allow humans to live in harmony, but such was not the case. They were solitary, they fought, and they did not cherish life. As a remedy, God created work in the hopes that it would bring men together. They could not build homes or grow food on their own, but instead of working in harmony, men formed competing groups that fought even more. As a remedy for these new problems, God created death. The hope was that an unpredictable death would make men cherish life, but instead it created even more inequity as the strong threatened the weak with death. God was disappointed with this inequity, and he created sickness. The hope was that the healthy would care for the sick, because when the caregivers became sick, those they cared for would return the favor. Men, however, did not care for each other because sickness created fear and disgust. God saw that men simply did not see that they could be happy, and he left them alone. Only in recent times have men finally realized that if they worked together and cared for each other, they could all achieve happiness.

== See also ==
- Bibliography of Leo Tolstoy
- Twenty-Three Tales
