= Katha Sagar =

- Genre: Drama
- Directed by: Shyam Benegal
- Country of origin: India
- Original language: Hindi
- No. of seasons: 1
- No. of episodes: 44

Production
- Producer: Cinevistaas
- Running time: 22 minutes

Original release
- Network: DD National
- Release: 1986 – 1986

Katha Sagar (translation:"A Sea of Stories") is an Indian television series that aired on DD National in 1986. The series featured a collection of stories by writers from around the world, including Katherine Mansfield, Guy de Maupassant, Leo Tolstoy, O. Henry, and Anton Chekhov. Each episode was directed by one of eight well known Indian directors, including Shyam Benegal, Kundan Shah, Ved Rahi and Satyen Bose. Most of the stories in the series were one episode long.

Many years after its original run, the series was again produced by Prem Krishen Malhotra and Sunil Mehta, founders of Cinevista Communications Limited.

== Plot ==
The series included 37 episodes based on stories including "Fear" by Guy de Maupassant, "The Overcoat" by Nikolai Gogol, "A Cup of Tea" by Katherine Mansfield, and "Where Love Is, God Is" by Leo Tolstoy. Some of the stories were adapted to fit an Indian context, but the adaptation embodied the essence of the original story.

== Episodes ==
No.	Title	Directed by	Based on
1	"Pratiksha"	Ved Rahi	"Where Love Is, God Is" by Leo Tolstoy
Cast : Saeed Jaffrey, Jayant Bhatt, Beena, Sulabha Deshpande, Abhi Bhattacharya
2	"Karz"	Kundan Shah	"The Clarion Call" by O. Henry
Cast : Deepak Kejriwal, Rajendra Gupta, Rama Vij
3	"Teen Sadhu"	Satyen Bose	"The Three Hermits" by Leo Tolstoy
Cast : Satyen Kappu, Anup Kumar, Brahmachari
4	"Ek Bhool"	Kundan Shah	"The Lion's Share" by Arnold Bennett
5	"Sannata"	Ved Rahi	"The Father" by Guy de Maupassant
6	"Roti Aur Pyar"	Anil Ganguly	"Love And Bread" by August Strindberg
Cast : Ashok Kumar, Kitu Gidwani, Asha Sharma
7	"Kalakriti"	Shyam Benegal	"The Last Leaf" by O. Henry
Cast : Neena Gupta, Supriya Pathak, Irshad Hashmi
8	"Bahut Der Kar Di"	Kundan Shah	"The Grasshopper" by Anton Chekhov
9	"Dard"	Anil Ganguly	"The Father" by Bjørnstjerne Bjørnson
Cast : Shammi Kapoor, Bharat Bhushan, Dinesh Hingoo
10	"Musafir"	Krishan Sethi	"On The Journey" by Guy de Maupassant
Cast : Kiran Juneja, Ajit Vachani, Shashi Puri, Prem Krishen
11	"Qaidi"	Anil Ganguly	"The Long Exile" by Leo Tolstoy
12	"Nandu Ki Chitthi"	Shyam Benegal	"'Vanka" by Anton Chekhov
Cast : A K Hangal, Joy Ghanekar
13	"Ward No. 6"	Shyam Benegal	"Ward No. 6" by Anton Chekhov
Cast : Irrfan Khan, Lalit Tiwari, Pankaj Berry
14	"Sahara"	Narendra Nath	"Simon's Papa" by Guy de Maupassant
15	"Sunheri Yaadein"	Krishan Sethi	"The Cripple" by Guy de Maupassant
16	"Sauda"	Shyam Benegal	"The Little Cask" by Guy de Maupassant
Cast : Waheeda Rehman, Satish Kaushik, Deepak Kejriwal
17	"Bhulava"	Kundan Shah	"Hearts and Crosses" by O. Henry
Cast : Benjamin Gilani, Deepika Chikhalia, Suresh Chatwal
18	"Ek Khula Hua Darwaza"	Shyam Benegal	"The Open Window" by H. H. Munro
Cast : Pallavi Joshi, Harish Patel, Sunila Pradhan
19	"Saboon Ki Tikiya"	Shyam Benegal	"Dusk" by H. H. Munro
Cast : Kulbhushan Kharbanda, K K Raina
20	"Chai Ka Ek Cup"	Shyam Benegal	"A Cup of Tea" by Katherine Mansfield
Cast : Iftekhar, Suresh Oberoi, Sharmila Tagore, Pallavi Joshi
21	"Nayi Fasal"	A. Salam	"The Story of a Farm Girl" by Guy de Maupassant
Cast : Archana Puran Singh, Vikram Gokhale, Shashi Puri, Asha Sharma
22	"Do Raaste"	N/A	"The Trimmed Lamp" by O. Henry
Cast : Radha Seth, Pallavi Joshi, Ajit Vachani, Lalit Tiwari, Mangal Dhillon, Sanjana Kapoor
23	"Girgit"	Shyam Benegal	"The Chameleon" by Anton Chekhov
Cast : Harish Patel, Ravi Jhankal
24	"Gehra Zakhm"	Kundan Shah	"The Invisible Wound" by Károly Kisfaludy
Cast : Ajit Vachani, Anjan Shrivastav
25	"Pachtava"	Krishan Sethi	"The Adopted Son" by Guy de Maupassant
Cast : Ajit Vachani, Sulbha Deshpande, Shashi Puri, Beena Banerjee, Pankaj Berry
26	"Tarannum"	Krishan Sethi	"Lulu's Triumph" by Matilde Serao
Cast : Vijayendra Ghatge, Beena, Supriya Pathak, Anuradha Patel
27	"Zameen"	Krishan Sethi	"How Much Land Does a Man Need?" by Leo Tolstoy
Cast : Parikshit Sahni
28	"Dushman"	Kundan Shah	"Squaring the Circle" by O. Henry
29	"Woh Ek Ladki"	Anil Ganguly	"The Girl Who Changed Her Mind" by Honoré de Balzac
Cast : Iftekhar, Vijayendra Ghatge, Tiku Talsania, Rupini, Ramesh Rai
30	"Chahat"	Shyam Benegal	"A Service Of Love" by O. Henry
Cast : Neena Gupta, Lucky Ali
31	"Nayi Sherwani"	Shyam Benegal	"The Overcoat" by Nikolai Gogol
Cast : Om Puri
32	"Anjam"	Ramesh Gupta	"The Inn" by Ivan Turgenev
33	"Do Tasveerein"	A. Salam	"The Debt" by Guy de Maupassant
Cast : Shashi Puri, Anjana Mumtaz, Deepak Kejriwal
34	"Maria"	Kundan Shah	The Fury by Paul Heyse
Cast : Kitu Gidwani, Mushtaq Khan
35	"Parvarish"	Krishan Sethi	"The Godson" by Leo Tolstoy
36	"Zamana"	A. Salam	"The Marquis de Fumerol" by Guy de Maupassant
37	"Sabse Bada Darr"	N/A	"Fear" by Guy de Maupassant

== Cast ==
- Sharmila Tagore as Uma
- Shammi Kapoor as Kartar
- Om Puri as Joe
- Saeed Jaffrey as Yashpal
- Tiku Talsania as Narayan
- Ashok Kumar as Sachin
- Utpal Dutt as Sanjay Saxena
- Waheeda Rehman as Anjali
- Moushumi Chatterjee as Laxmi
- Marc Zuber as Gautam
- Kulbhushan Kharbanda as Kedarnath Acharya
- Anjan Srivastav as Nekchand
- Kiran Kumar as Gorakh Sharma
- Kitu Gidwani as Ritu
- Archana Puran Singh as Aruna
- Mangal Dhillon as Maj Alok
- Shashi Puri as Dr Sudhir
- Vijayendra Ghatge as Mr Prakash Kumar
- Vikram Gokhale as Verma
- Raza Murad as Capt Prithvi
- Parikshit Sahni as Ajay
- Beena as Asha
- Neena Gupta as Chitra
- Suresh Oberoi as Arun
- Pallavi Joshi as Shanta
- Supriya Pathak as Reshma
- Bindu as Mona
- Rohini Hattangadi as Shanti
- Vishnu Sharma as Jaganath
- Radha Seth as Pooja
- Satish Kaushik as Mohan
- Bharat Bhushan as Ramnath
- Satyen Kappu as Ramcharan
- Benjamin Gilani as Rakesh
- Lucky Ali as Ramesh
- Ajit Vachani as Bhagwat
- Harish Patel as Roopchand
- K. K. Raina as Dharmesh
- Iftekhar as Shyamlal
- A. K. Hangal as Vipin
- Anjana Mumtaz as Parvati
- Irrfan Khan as Manohar
- Ravi Jhankal as Ganpat Jadhav
- Pankaj Berry as Bhushan
- Rajendra Gupta as Swaraj
- Lalit Tiwari as Bharat
- Sulbha Deshpande as Sarita
- Dina Pathak as Sarla
- Sulabha Arya as Arpita
- Rama Vij as Sushma
- Naresh Suri as Vinod
- Urmila Matondkar as Dhwani
- Shreeram Lagoo as SK
- Meera Madhuri as Sunita
