= Ivan the Fool (story) =

Russian fairy tale by Leo Tolstoy

"Ivan the Fool" (also known as "Ivan the Fool and his Two Brothers") is an 1886 short story (in fact, a literary fairy tale) by Leo Tolstoy, published in 1886. The name "Ivan the Fool" alludes to a popular hero of Russian folklore.

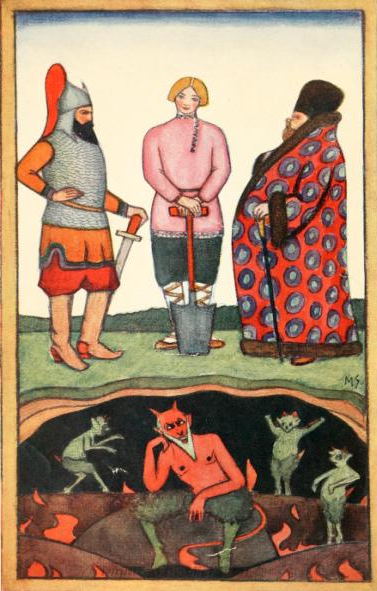
Ivan the Fool

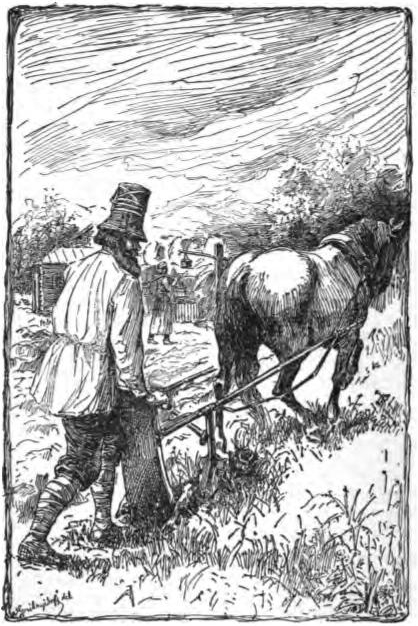
'The Fool strikes his first snag', from English translation of "Ivan the Fool"

== Synopsis ==
It describes the struggles of three brothers and a sister, the offspring of a rich peasant, against the Old Devil:

- Simeon, a soldier
- Tarras-Briukhan or "Tarras the fat belly", a merchant
- Ivan, a fool
- Martha, a mute

Simeon and Tarras leave the family farm. Simeon becomes a great soldier and marries a noble's daughter, but despite being granted an estate and high rank, runs out of money because of his spendthrift wife. He goes home and demands a third share of his father's wealth. His father is unwilling to do so, as Ivan and Martha are the ones who helped him prosper, but Ivan has no objection, and Simeon receives his share.

Tarras becomes a rich merchant. However, his greed drives him to also insist on his share. His father objects, but Ivan again readily agrees to his brother's demands.

The Old Devil is greatly displeased that, due to Ivan's generosity, there is no conflict between the brothers, so he assigns a little devil to each brother to cause trouble. Simeon's devil fills him with excessive courage, leading to a disaster on the battlefield. For his failure, Simeon is scheduled for execution, but escapes from prison and returns home. The devil assigned to Tarras inflames his greed; he spends all of his money and borrows more to buy goods. He cannot pay back the loans, so he too flees home. Neither brother treats Ivan with any respect.

The third devil makes Ivan sick and sees to it that his plowing becomes much more difficult, but Ivan just works harder and overcomes the obstacles. Ivan discovers his little devil and is about to kill him, but the devil offers a wish in exchange for his life. Ivan wishes to be cured of his sickness. The devil heals him with a root. With that accomplished, Ivan lets the devil go, but by innocently blessing him in God's name causes the devil to disappear. Simeon's devil, his assigned work finished, plagues Ivan, but Ivan finds him too, and the same sort of thing happens. For sparing his life, the devil shows Ivan how to create soldiers from straw. Once again, Ivan lets him go with God's blessing, causing the devil to vanish. The third devil suffers the same fate, after showing Ivan how to make gold using oak leaves.

Ivan invites his brothers to a feast, but they decline, so Ivan hosts the village peasants. He gives them gold coins, then creates soldiers to sing and dance for them, before turning the soldiers back into straw. When Ivan's brothers find out what he can do, he conjures up an army for Simeon and bushels of coins for Tarras. Simeon conquers a kingdom, while Tarras has plenty of money, but they are not satisfied. They go to Ivan and demand more soldiers and gold. This time, however, Ivan refuses, as he has learned that they have caused misery with his gifts. Simeon then gives Tarras half his kingdom in exchange for half of Tarras's gold.

One day, the Czar's daughter becomes ill. The Czar offers a rich reward and her hand in marriage to any man who can cure her. Ivan gives his last magic healing root to an ailing old woman, but still goes to see the daughter. The instant he reaches her balcony, she is cured. They are married, and when the Czar dies, Ivan has a kingdom, just like his brothers.

Simeon is feared by all, while Tarras still collects taxes, despite having more money than he needs. Ivan, on the other hand, does not enjoy being a ruler. He sends for his parents and sister and resumes his old life. His wife, after thinking it over, joins him.

The Old Devil becomes impatient, waiting for his little devils to return, and sets out to do their job himself. He shows Simeon how to strengthen his army. Simeon conquers a neighboring country, but when he attacks India, he is defeated. The Old Devil then sets up as a merchant in Tarras's kingdom. He pays more than Tarras for workers and goods, no matter how much Tarras offers, so Tarras's money is useless.

The Old Devil goes to Ivan disguised as a General and offers to form a powerful army from his subjects. Ivan does not object, but his people are not interested, and Ivan does not force them to enlist. The Old Devil then incites the ruler of another country to invade, but Ivan's people are fools like him (the wise having fled Ivan's rule) and treat the invaders so well that the soldiers all desert. The Old Devil then transforms himself into a nobleman and offers to build Ivan a palace and factories. At first, the people work for him, but once they have enough gold, they stop. They will not even sell him any food. He then spends days talking to the people, to instruct them on how to use their brains rather than their hands to do their work, but they are unimpressed. When he becomes faint from hunger, he asks for bread. They laugh at him, and he collapses. Defeated, he disappears through a hole in the ground.

== Analysis ==
Although the story is usually considered a children's fairy tale, it is also used as an indication of Tolstoy's political leanings in support of Christianity. Though his brothers are easily tempted by money and military power, unsophisticated Ivan, with his simple way of life, defeats the treacherous devil. Ivan eventually becomes the ruler of the country despite the lack of a standing army or currency. All of the citizens are welcome at Ivan's table, where workers are fed first and intellectuals (those without calluses on their hands) have to eat the leftovers.

== See also ==
- Bibliography of Leo Tolstoy
- Twenty-Three Tales
