= Two Old Men (story) =

Short story by Leo Tolstoy

"Two Old Men" ("Два старика") is a short story by Leo Tolstoy written in 1885. It is a religious piece that was translated to English by Leo Wiener in 1904. According to Christianity Today, it is the story of Efim and Elisha, two neighbors who decide to make a pilgrimage to Jerusalem before dying, "but one gets sidetracked caring for a needy family".

== Publication and Commentary ==
The story was retold in a sermon by Benedictine monk David Steindl-Rast, who concluded his retelling with, "Who really got to the goal of the pilgrimage?" The story is included in numerous Tolstoy collections, such as Twenty-Three Tales (1924), Leo Tolstoy's 20 Greatest Short Stories (2009), and Tolstoy: Tales of Courage and Conflict (1986).

== See also ==
- Bibliography of Leo Tolstoy
- Twenty-Three Tales
