= The Three Questions =

- Short story by Leo Tolstoy
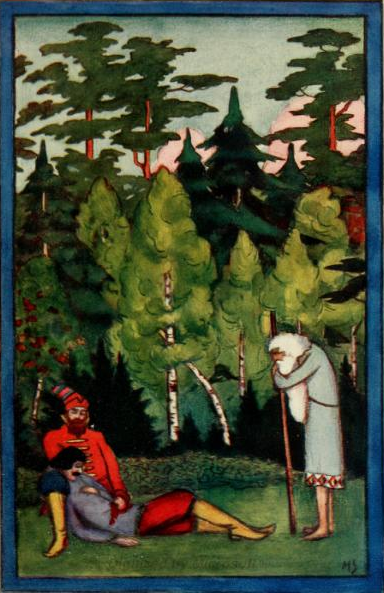
- A 1916 cover illustration by Michael Sevier
- Translator: Aylmer and Louise Maude
- Country: Russia
- Language: Russian
- Genre: Parable

Publication
- Published in: What Men Live By, and Other Tales
- Media type: Print
- Publication date: 1885

"The Three Questions" is a 1908 short story by Russian author Leo Tolstoy as part of the collection What Men Live By, and Other Tales. The story takes the form of a parable, and it concerns a king who wants to find the answers to what he considers the three most important questions in life.

== Synopsis ==
One day, a king determines that he will be able to cope with any occurrence if he has the answers to three critical questions:

1. What is the best time to begin everything?
2. Who are the best people to listen to?
3. What is the most important thing to do?

Many educated men attempted to answer the king's questions, but they all came up with different answers. The king decided to ask a wise hermit in a nearby village. The hermit would only see common folk, however, so the king disguised himself as a peasant and left his guards behind to see the hermit. The hermit was digging flower beds when the king arrived. The king asked his questions, but the hermit went on digging rather laboriously. The king offered to dig for him for a while. After digging for some time, the king again asked his questions.

Before the hermit could answer, a man emerged from the woods, bleeding from a terrible stomach wound. The king tended to him, and they stayed the night in the hermit's hut. By the next day, the wounded man was doing better but was incredulous at the help he had received. The man confessed that he knew who the king was and that the king had executed his brother and seized his property. He had come to kill the king, but the guards wounded him in the stomach. The man pledged allegiance to the king, asked for forgiveness and went on his way.

The king asked the hermit again for his answers, and the hermit responded that his questions had already been answered:

1. The most important time is now.
2. The most important person is whoever you are with.
3. The most important thing is to help the person you are with.

== See also ==
- Bibliography of Leo Tolstoy
- Twenty-Three Tales
