= Scarabea: How Much Land Does a Man Need? =

1969 film

- Theatrical release poster
- Directed by: Hans-Jürgen Syberberg
- Screenplay by: Hans-Jürgen Syberberg
- Based on: "How Much Land Does a Man Need?" by Leo Tolstoy
- Produced by: Hans Jürgen Syberberg
- Starring: Walter Buschhoff; Nicoletta Machiavelli; Franz Friedrich Graf Treuberg; Karsten Peters
- Cinematography: Petrus Schloemp
- Edited by: Barbara Mondry
- Music by: Eugen Thomass
- Production company: TMS Film GmbH
- Release date: 10 January 1969
- Running time: 114 minutes
- Country: West Germany
- Language: German

Scarabea: How Much Land Does a Man Need? (German: Scarabea - wieviel Erde braucht der Mensch?) is a 1969 West German drama film directed by Hans-Jürgen Syberberg, starring Walter Buschhoff, Nicoletta Machiavelli, Franz Friedrich Graf Treuberg and Karsten Peters. The film was Syberberg's first fiction film and uses motifs from the 1886 short story "How Much Land Does a Man Need?" by Leo Tolstoy. It won the Deutscher Filmpreis for Best Actor (Buschhoff) and Best Cinematography.

== Plot ==
A German tourist in Sardinia goes on a hike which becomes a brutal experience.

== Cast ==
- Walter Buschhoff as G. W. Bach
- Nicoletta Machiavelli as Scarabea
- Franz Friedrich Graf Treuberg as Der Graf
- Karsten Peters as Regisseur
- Chris A. Holenia
- Rudolf Rhomberg
- Norma Jordan
