= What Is Art? =

1898 book by Leo Tolstoy

What Is Art? (Russian: Что такое искусство? Chto takoye iskusstvo?) is a book by Leo Tolstoy. It was completed in Russian in 1897 but first published in English in 1898 due to difficulties with the Russian censors.

Tolstoy cites the time, effort, public funds, and public respect spent on art and artists as well as the imprecision of general opinions on art as reason for writing the book. In his words, "it is difficult to say what is meant by art, and especially what is good, useful art, art for the sake of which we might condone such sacrifices as are being offered at its shrine".

Throughout the book Tolstoy demonstrates an "unremitting moralism", evaluating artworks in light of his radical Christian ethics, and displaying a willingness to dismiss accepted masters, including Beethoven, Wagner, Shakespeare, and Dante, as well as the bulk of his own writings.

Having rejected the use of beauty in definitions of art (see aesthetics), Tolstoy conceptualises art as anything that communicates emotion: "Art begins when a man, with the purpose of communicating to other people a feeling he once experienced, calls it up again within himself and expresses it by certain external signs".

This view of art is inclusive: "jokes", "home decoration", and "church services" may all be considered art as long as they convey feeling. It is also amoral: "[f]eelings ... very bad and very good, if only they infect the reader ... constitute the subject of art".

Tolstoy also notes that the "sincerity" of the artist – that is, the extent to which the artist "experiences the feeling he conveys" – influences the infection.

== Evaluating the content of art ==
While Tolstoy's basic conception of art is broad and amoral, his idea of "good" art is strict and moralistic, based on what he sees as the function of art in the development of humanity:

just as in the evolution of knowledge – that is, the forcing out and supplanting of mistaken and unnecessary knowledge by truer and more necessary knowledge – so the evolution of feelings takes place by means of art, replacing lower feelings, less kind and less needed for the good of humanity, by kinder feelings, more needed for that good. This is the purpose of art.

== Christian art ==
Tolstoy's analysis is influenced by his radical Christian views (see The Kingdom of God is Within You), views which led him to be excommunicated from the Russian Orthodox Church in 1901. He states that Christian art, rooted in "the consciousness of sonship to God and the brotherhood of men":

can evoke reverence for each man's dignity, for every animal’s life, it can evoke the shame of luxury, of violence, of revenge, of using for one’s pleasure objects that are a necessity for other people, it can make people sacrifice themselves to serve others freely and joyfully, without noticing it.

Ultimately, "by calling up the feelings of brotherhood and love in people under imaginary conditions, religious art will accustom people to experiencing the same feelings in reality under the same conditions".

Tolstoy's examples: Schiller's The Robbers, Victor Hugo's Les Misérables, Charles Dickens's A Tale of Two Cities and The Chimes, Harriet Beecher Stowe's Uncle Tom's Cabin, Dostoevsky's The House of the Dead, George Eliot's Adam Bede, Ge's Judgement, Liezen-Mayer's Signing the Death Sentence, and paintings "portraying the labouring man with respect and love" such as those by Millet, Breton, Lhermitte, and Defregger.

== Universal art ==
"Universal" art illustrates that people are "already united in the oneness of life's joys and sorrows" by communicating "feelings of the simplest, most everyday sort, accessible to all people without exception, such as the feelings of merriment, tenderness, cheerfulness, peacefulness, and so on". Tolstoy contrasts this ideal with art that is partisan in nature, whether it be by class, religion, nation, or style.

Tolstoy's examples: he mentions, with many qualifiers, the works of Cervantes, Dickens, Moliere, Gogol, and Pushkin, comparing all of these unfavourably to the story of Joseph. In music he commends a violin aria of Bach, the E-flat major nocturne of Chopin, and "selected passages" from Schubert, Haydn, Chopin, and Mozart. He also speaks briefly of genre paintings and landscapes.

== Obscurity versus accessibility ==
Tolstoy notes the susceptibility of his contemporaries to the "charm of obscurity". Works have become laden with "euphemisms, mythological and historical allusions", and general "vagueness, mysteriousness, obscurity and inaccessibility to the masses". Tolstoy lambastes such works, insisting that art can and should be comprehensible to everyone. Having emphasised that art has a function in the improvement of humanity – capable of expressing man's best sentiment – he finds it offensive that artists should be so wilfully and arrogantly abstruse.

== Artificiality ==
One criticism Tolstoy levels against art is that at some point it "ceased to be sincere and became artificial and cerebral", leading to the creation of millions of works of technical brilliance but few of honourable sentiment. Tolstoy outlines four common markers of bad art: these are not however considered the canon or ultimate indicators

1. Borrowing
2. Imitation
3. Effectfulness
4. Diversion

=== Borrowing ===
Involves recycling and concentrating elements from other works, typical examples of which are: "maidens, warriors, shepherds, hermits, angels, devils in all forms, moonlight, thunderstorms, mountains, the sea, precipices, flowers, long hair, lions, the lamb, the dove, the nightingale".

=== Imitation ===
Imitation is highly descriptive realism, where painting becomes photography, or a scene in a book becomes a listing of facial expressions, tone of voice, the setting, and so on. Any potential communication of feeling is "disrupted by the superfluity of details".

=== Effectfulness ===
Reliance on "strikingness", often involving contrasts of "horrible and tender, beautiful and ugly, loud and soft, dark and light", descriptions of lust, "crescendo and complication", unexpected changes in rhythm, tempo, etc. Tolstoy contends that works marked by such techniques "do not convey any feeling, but only affect the nerves".

=== Diversion ===
Diversion is "an intellectual interest added to the work of art", such as the melding of documentary and fiction, as well as the writing of novels, poetry, and music "in such a way that they must be puzzled out". All such works do not correspond with Tolstoy's view of art as the infection of others with feelings previously experienced, and his exhortation that art be "universal" in appeal.

== Causes ==
=== Church Christianity and the Renaissance ===
Tolstoy approves of early Christian art for being inspired by love of Christ and man, as well as its antagonism to pleasure-seeking. He prefers this to the art born of "Church Christianity", which ostensibly evades the "essential theses of true Christianity" (that is, that all men are born of the Father, are equals, and should strive towards mutual love). Art became pagan – worshipping religious figures – and subservient to the dictates of the Church.

The corruption of art was deepened after the Crusades, as the abuse of papal power became more obvious. The rich began to doubt, seeing contradictions between the actions of the Church and the message of Christianity. But instead of turning back to the early Christian teachings, the upper classes began to appreciate and commission art that was merely pleasing. This tendency was facilitated by the Renaissance, with the aggrandisement of ancient Greek art, philosophy, and culture which, Tolstoy alleges, is inclined to pleasure and beauty worship.

=== Aesthetic theory ===
Tolstoy perceives the roots of aesthetics in the Renaissance. Art for pleasure was validated in reference to the philosophy of the Greeks and the elevation of “beauty” as a legitimate criterion with which to separate good from bad art.

Tolstoy moves to discredit aesthetics by reviewing and reducing previous theories – including those of Baumgarten, Kant (Critique of Judgement), Hegel, Hume, and Schopenhauer – to two main “aesthetic definitions of beauty”:

1. The "objective" or "mystical" definition of beauty in which beauty is "something absolutely perfect which exists outside us", whether it be associated with "idea, spirit, will, God"
2. The "subjective" definition of beauty, in which "beauty is a certain pleasure we experience, which does not have personal advantage as its aim". This definition tends to be more inclusive, enabling things like food and fabric to be called art

Tolstoy then argues that, despite their apparent divergence, there is little substantive difference between the two strands. This is because both schools recognise beauty only by the pleasure it gives: "both notions of beauty come down to a certain sort of pleasure that we receive, meaning that we recognize as beauty that which pleases us without awakening our lust". Therefore, there is no objective definition of art in aesthetics.

Tolstoy condemns the focus on beauty/pleasure at length, calling aesthetics a discipline:

according to which the difference between good art, conveying good feelings, and bad art, conveying wicked feelings, was totally obliterated, and one of the lowest manifestations of art, art for mere pleasure – against which all teachers of mankind have warned people – came to be regarded as the highest art. And art became, not the important thing it was intended to be, but the empty amusement of idle people.

=== Professionalism ===
Tolstoy sees the developing professionalism of art as hampering the creation of good works.

The professional artist can and must create to prosper, making for art that is insincere and most likely partisan – made to suit the whims of fashion or patrons.

Art criticism is a symptom of the obscurity of art, for "[a]n artist, if he is a true artist, has in his work conveyed to others the feelings he has experienced: what is there to explain?". Criticism, moreover, tends to contribute to the veneration of "authorities" such as Shakespeare and Dante. By constant unfavourable comparison, the young artist is corralled into imitating the works of the greats, as all of them are said to be true art. In short, new artists imitate the classics, setting their own feelings aside, which, according to Tolstoy, is contrary to the point of art.

Art schools teach people how to imitate the method of the masters, but they cannot teach the sincerity of emotion that is the propellant of great works. In Tolstoy's words, "[n]o school can call up feelings in a man, and still less can it teach a man what is the essence of art: the manifestation of feeling in his own particular fashion".

== Consequences ==
1. "[T]he enormous waste of working people's labour", with individuals spending so much time contemplating and creating bad art that they become "incapable of anything that is really necessary for people"
2. The volume of art produced provides "the amusement which turns these people's eyes from the meaninglessness of their lives and saves them from the boredom that oppresses them", it enables them "to go on living without noticing the meaninglessness and cruelty of their life"
3. The confusion and perversion of values. It becomes normal to worship not great religious figures but people who write incomprehensible poems
4. The worship of beauty legitimises the disregarding of morality as a criterion for evaluating cultural products
5. Modern art "directly corrupts people" by infecting them with feelings of superstition, patriotism, and sensuality

== Criticism of famous artists ==
Throughout the book Tolstoy demonstrates a willingness to dismiss generally accepted masters, among them Richard Wagner, Liszt, Richard Strauss, Nietzsche, and Oscar Wilde. He also labels his own works as "bad art", excepting only the short stories "God Sees the Truth" and "Prisoner of the Caucasus".

He attempts to justify these conclusions by pointing to the ostensible chaos of previous aesthetic analysis. Theories usually involve selecting popular works and constructing principles from these examples. Volkelt, for instance, remarks that art cannot be judged on its moral content because then Romeo and Juliet would not be good art. Such retrospective justification cannot, Tolstoy stresses, be the basis for theory, as people will tend to create subjective frameworks to justify their own tastes.

== Reception ==
Jahn notes the "often confusing use of categorisation" and the lack of definition of the key concept of emotion. Bayley writes that "the effectiveness of What is Art? lies not so much in its positive assertions as in its rejection of much that was taken for granted in the aesthetic theories of the time". Noyes criticises Tolstoy's dismissal of beauty, but states that, "despite its shortcomings", What is Art? "may be pronounced the most stimulating critical work of our time". Simmons mentions the "occasional brilliant passages" along with the "repetition, awkward language, and loose terminology". Aylmer Maude, translator of many of Tolstoy's writings, calls it "probably the most masterly of all Tolstoy's works", citing the difficulty of the subject matter and its clarity. For a comprehensive review of the reception at the time of publication, see Maude 1901b.

== Editions ==
- Tolstoy, Leo (1995 [1897]). What is Art? (Translated by Richard Pevear and Larissa Volokhonsky). London: Penguin.

== See also ==
- Leo Tolstoy bibliography
