= Quench the Spark =

Short story by Leo Tolstoy

"Quench the Spark" (Russian: "Упустишь огонь – не потушишь", also translated as "A Spark Neglected Burns the House") is a short story by Russian author Leo Tolstoy first published in 1885. The story takes the form of a parable concerning the virtues of reconciliation.

== Plot ==
The story opens with the family of Ivan Shtchevbakoff; a generally harmonious family that does rather well for itself. They were on good terms with their neighbors, the family of Gabriel Chormoi, until one day when a hen that belonged to the Shtchevbakoff family flew into the yard of the Chormoi family and laid several eggs. Later that day, Ivan's daughter-in-law went to retrieve the eggs, but grandmother Chormoi takes offense at being accused of stealing. A huge uproar ensues that embroils every member of each family.

Against the advice of the family elders to seek quick reconciliation, the families bring cases against each other in court, and they blame each other for every little mishap that happens to befall them. Every accusation makes the enmity grow, the children learn from the example of their parents, and the feud goes on for six years.

The elders urge for the families to forget their differences, but the feud continues. A drunken Gabriel strikes one of Ivan's daughters-in-law, and Ivan eventually sees to it that he is sentenced to flogging. Gabriel is shocked, and he curses his neighbor. The magistrate urges the two to reconcile, but Gabriel refuses.

Ivan eventually begins to feel sorry for Gabriel, but he refuses to see his own wrongdoing in the quarrel. Ivan's father urges him to reconcile, to stop wasting his time and money going to court, and to stop setting a bad example for his family. Ivan still refuses to reconcile.

Eventually Gabriel sets Ivan's house on fire. No neighbors will help Ivan save his belongings, and eventually the fire overtakes Gabriel's house as well. Ivan's father is burned in the fire, and, on his deathbed, Ivan's father asks his son whose fault the fire was. Ivan finally realizes that it was his fault, and asks forgiveness from his father and from God. His father urges Ivan never to tell that it was Gabriel that had set the fire, and Ivan agrees.

Gabriel and Ivan again became good friends, and their families lived together as their houses were rebuilt. The families then go on to become more prosperous than ever, all for following the elders' advice: to quench a spark before it becomes a fire.

== See also ==
- Bibliography of Leo Tolstoy
- Twenty-Three Tales
