= The Grain =

1886 short story by Leo Tolstoy

"The Grain" or "A Grain As Big As A Hen's Egg" (Russian: Зерно с куриное яйцо) is an 1886 short story by Leo Tolstoy about a king seeking to understand the properties of a grain he acquires.

== Summary ==
A grain of corn the size of a hen's egg is found and is taken to the king. The king wanted to know where such a large grain could come from, and he had his men bring him an old peasant, hoping that he might know something of it. An old decrepit peasant, nearly blind and unable to walk, was brought before the king. The king showed him the grain, and the peasant said that he had never seen anything like it before, but maybe his father would know something. The peasant's father was found and brought before the king. The father was apparently healthier than the son, with only one bad leg and better eyes. He, however, had not seen such large grain either, but said that the grain had been larger in his time, and suggested that his father might know something about it. That peasant's father was found, and he was a healthy man with good legs and bright eyes. He identified the grain as one that he and his family had planted in abundance in their time, and went on to tell how they had not owned land, nor used money, people simply worked the land and lived on what they grew. The king then asked why the grain had become smaller and the people more infirm. The oldest peasant said that it was because people had become reliant on other people's labour.

== Covet ==
- Translated into Telugu as "Kodi Guddhantha Godhuma Ginja" by Mahidhara Jaganmohana Rao.

== See also ==
- Bibliography of Leo Tolstoy
- Twenty-Three Tales
