= Twenty-Three Tales =

Short story by Leo Tolstoy

Twenty-Three Tales is a popular compilation of short stories by Leo Tolstoy. According to its publisher, Oxford University Press, the collection is about contemporary classes in Russia during Tolstoy's time, written in a brief, morality-tale style. It was translated into English by Louise Maude and Aylmer Maude.

== Contents ==
The stories are divided into seven parts:

1. Tales for Children
  1. God Sees the Truth, But Waits
  2. The Prisoner of the Caucasus
  3. The Bear Hunt
2. Popular Stories
  1. What Men Live By
  2. Quench the Spark
  3. Two Old Men
  4. Where Love Is, God Is
3. A Fairy Tale
  1. Ivan the Fool
4. Stories Written to Pictures
  1. Evil Allures, But Good Endures
  2. Wisdom of Children
  3. Ilyás
5. Folk-Tales Retold
  1. The Three Hermits
  2. Promoting a Devil
  3. How Much Land Does a Man Need?
  4. The Grain
  5. The Godson
  6. Repentance
  7. The Empty Drum
6. Adaptations from the French
  1. The Coffee-House of Surat
  2. Too Dear!
7. Stories Given to Aid the Persecuted Jews
  1. Esarhaddon, King of Assyria
  2. Work, Death, and Sickness
  3. The Three Questions

== Reception ==
According to Plough, a publication managed by the Anabaptist Bruderhof Communities since 1920, the work is perfect for those daunted by the longer, complicated works of the Russian master, saying that these tales "illumine eternal truths with forceful brevity." According to Rabbi Dr. Israel Drazin, a 2009 reviewer with HistoryInReview, Twenty-Three Tales is an excellent collection that doesn't focus too much on Tolstoy's opinion of Christianity, so much as it is "about proper behavior: that people should help one another." According to famed Tolstoy translator Aylmer Maude, the work contains "several of his best tales for the people: 'How Much Land Does a Man Need?', 'Ilyas', 'The Three Hermits', and the excellent temperance story, 'The Imp and the crust.'"

Austrian philosopher Ludwig Wittgenstein had deep appreciation for Tolstoy and Twenty-Three Tales. He was particularly fond of the four stories, 'What Men Live By', 'The Two Old Men', 'The Three Hermits', and 'How Much Land Does a Man Need?', of these he said "There you have the essence of Christianity!".

== Editions ==
According to an editor at Cambridge University Press, at least one of the stories presented Tolstoy had heard from a wandering storyteller in 1876.

The work was originally published in 1907 by Funk & Wagnalls. It was published by Oxford University Press in 1917, 1924, who would republish it again in 1928, 1947, and 1950.

It was republished by The Plough (maintained by the Bruderhof Communities) in 1998.

== See also ==
- Bibliography of Leo Tolstoy
