= The First Distiller =

Play by Leo Tolstoy

The First Distiller, subtitled How the Imp Earned a Crust (Russian: Первый винокур, или Как чертенок краюшку заслужил), is a play by Leo Tolstoy published in 1886, and translated into English by Aylmer and Louise Maude.

According to academic Andrew Donskov, The First Distiller was an anti-alcohol morality play, based on Tolstoy's short story Promoting a Devil, that drew upon numerous literary themes already present in Russian literature in the 1860s, such as A. F. Pogossky's 1861 story of the same title.

It was first translated into French by the famous Polish translator Téodor de Wyzewa in November 1886.

== Text online ==
=== Russian ===
- Первый винокур, или Как чертенок краюшку выкупал, from rvb.ru

=== English ===
- The First Distiller: A Comedy in Six Acts, from RevoltLib.com
- The First Distiller, from Marxists.org
- The First Distiller, from TheAnarchistLibrary.org
- The First Distiller, from Project Gutenberg
