= Too Dear! =

Short story by Russian author Leo Tolstoy

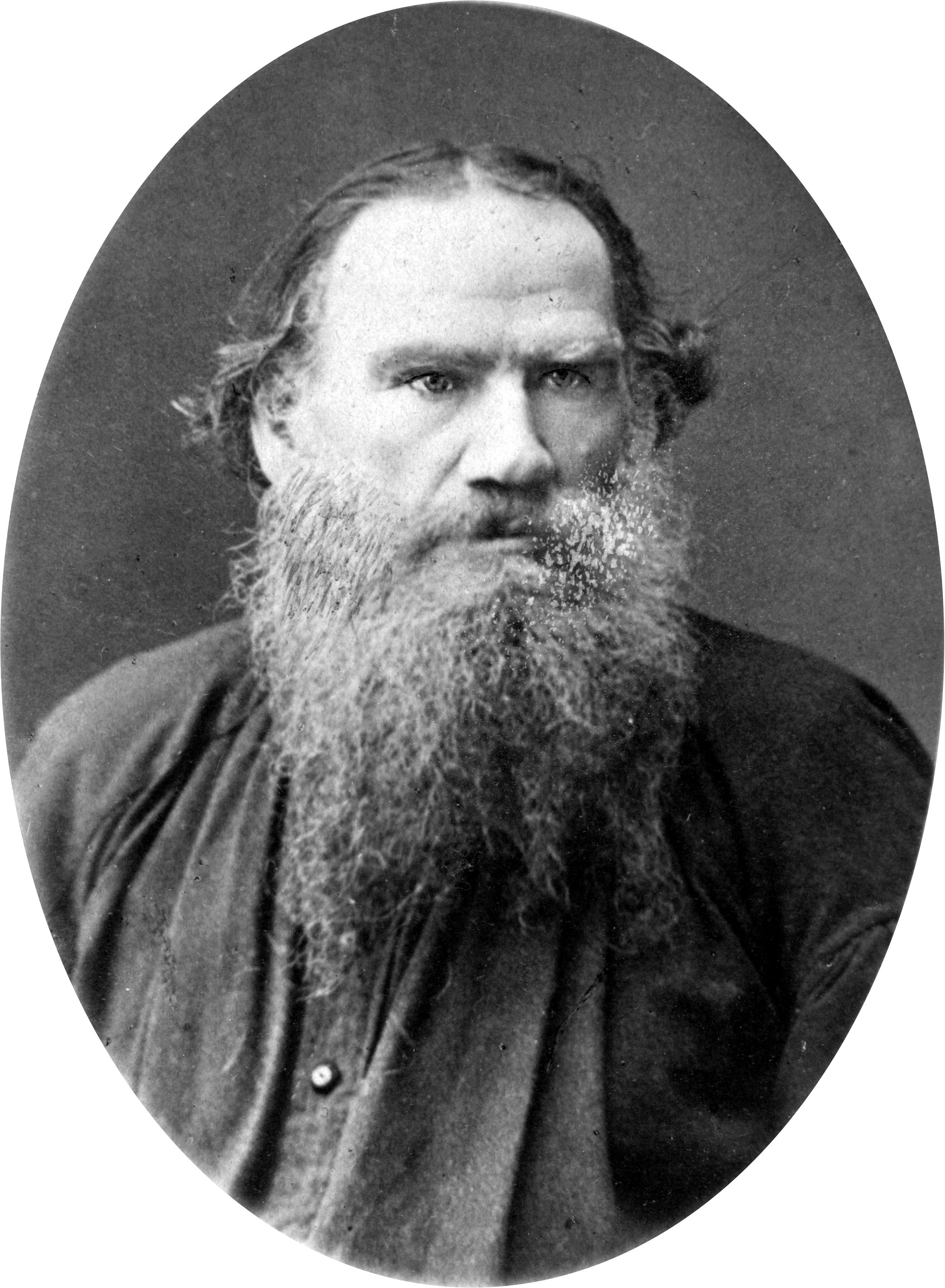
Leo Tolstoy

"Too Dear!" is a short story by Russian author Leo Tolstoy first published in 1897. It is a humorous account of the troubles of dealing with a criminal in the kingdom of Monaco.

== See also ==
- Bibliography of Leo Tolstoy
- Twenty-Three Tales
- Capital punishment in Monaco

== References the theme on the story of Too Dear ==
- "The Works of Tolstoi." Black's Readers Service Company: Roslyn, New York. 1928.
