= Evil Allures, But Good Endures =

"Evil Allures, But Good Endures" ("Вражье лепко, а божье крепко") (AKA: Hatred is Sweet, but God is Strong) is a short story by Leo Tolstoy written in 1885. It is commonly included in the massively-reproduced collection Twenty-three Tales.

== Literary Criticism ==
In 1923, it was listed in the index of short stories for Leo Tolstoy by Ina Ten Eyck Firkins.

According to the Cambridge Companion, the work was modeled on the lubok, the traditional, early-printed sheets in Russian literary circles, similar to the work of European Renaissance scribes, where imagery was interwoven with the worded message. According to a literary study published by University of Santo Tomas, this was another example of a Tolstoy work where the moral was definitely present and even in the title.

== Publication history ==
Like many other Tolstoy pieces, this work has been republished in English dozens of times. It was republished in hardback or paperback in 1924, 2008, 2009, and 2020.

== See also ==
- Bibliography of Leo Tolstoy
- Twenty-Three Tales
