= Repentance (story) =

Short story by Leo Tolstoy

"Repentance" (Russian: "Кающийся грешник", sometimes translated as "The Repentant Sinner") is a short story by Russian author Leo Tolstoy first published in 1886 by Intermediary. The story details the difficulties of a repentant sinner's attempts to enter Heaven. Like several other of Tolstoy's stories, it was based on folklore and religious tales.

== Synopsis ==
The story opens with the imminent death of a 70-year-old sinner. The man has never done a good deed in his life, and only with his last words did he address God and ask for forgiveness. When the man dies his soul comes before the gates of Heaven, but they are locked. The man knocks and knocks at the gates, but to no avail. Finally, the Accuser decrees that such a sinner cannot enter Heaven, and all the man's sins are recited. The sinner begs to be let in, but Peter the Apostle explains that such a sinner cannot be allowed in. The sinner points out that for all of Peter's virtue, he still sinned by denying Christ. He is still not let in.

The sinner continues his knocking, and is again met by his list of sins by the Accuser. Now King David explains that such a sinner cannot be allowed in. The sinner points out that for all of David's virtue, he still sinned by committing adultery. He is still not let in.

The sinner continues his knocking, and now is spoken to by John the Apostle. The sinner pleads with John, saying that he of all people should understand repentance. The repentant sinner is finally allowed into Heaven.

== Themes ==
According to The Cambridge Companion to Tolstoy, a central theme in the work is forgiveness.

== See also ==
- Bibliography of Leo Tolstoy
- Twenty-Three Tales
