= How Much Land Does a Man Need? =

1886 Short story by Leo Tolstoy

"How Much Land Does a Man Require?"
- Short story by Leo Tolstoy
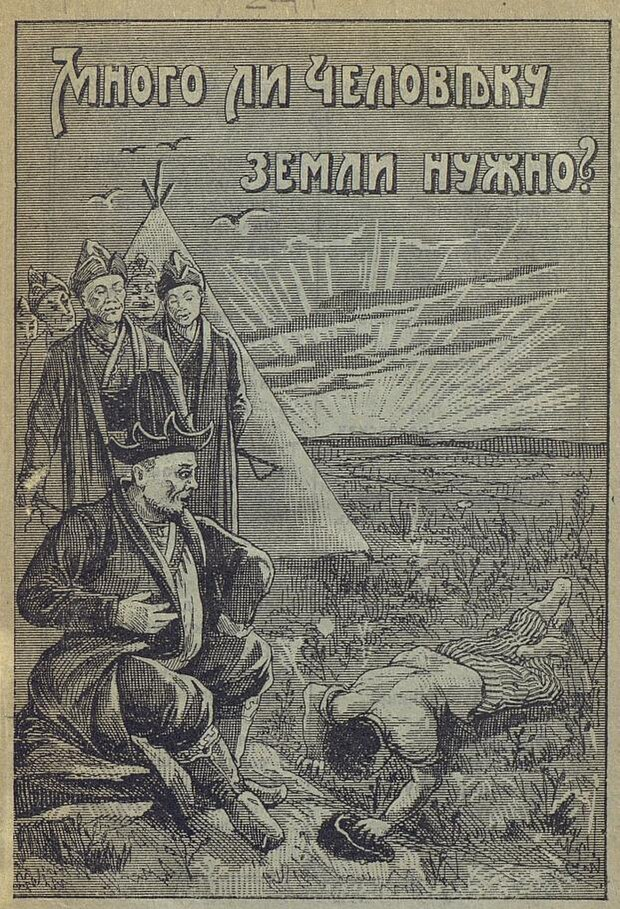
- An illustration of "How Much Land Does a Man Need?", 1914
- Original title: Много ли человеку земли нужно?
- Country: Russia
- Language: Russian
- Genre: Short story

Publication
- Publication date: 1886

"How Much Land Does a Man Require?" (Russian: Много ли человеку земли нужно?; Mnogo li cheloveku zemli nuzhno?) is an 1886 short story by Leo Tolstoy about a man who, in his greed, forfeits everything.

== Synopsis ==
A peasant, Pahom, overhears his wife and sister-in-law arguing over the merits of town and peasant farm life. He thinks to himself, "If I had plenty of land, I shouldn't fear the Devil himself!". Unbeknownst to him, Satan is eavesdropping.

Pahom runs afoul of the steward of a local landowner, who fines him when his livestock keep escaping and damaging the landowner's property. Hearing that the landowner is selling her land, the village peasants attempt to buy the land, but are unable to agree on how to pay; each villager instead buys what they can afford: Pahom buys 40 acres, paying off half and taking a loan for the other half.

Pahom becomes possessive of his land, causing arguments and levying fines against his neighbors when their livestock trespasses. After finding some trees cut down on his property, Pahom complains to the law, but the accused villager is acquitted; Pahom's attitude toward other villagers earns their ire: "Threats to burn his building began to be uttered."

A peasant passing through the village tells Pahom that settlers are moving to a commune east of the Volga river, where there is ample fertile land. Pahom takes a boat down the Volga to Samára and heads east to confirm the settler's story. Wanting to start over, Pahom sells his land and belongings and receives 125 acres in the new commune. Initially pleased with his move, the villagers soon quarrel over the best use of the communal pasture, with some, like Pahom, wanting to sow wheat, and others wanting to rent it out to raise money. Pahom decides to rent more land so he can grow more wheat, and starts saving money to buy his own land.

Eventually, he tires of farming on rented land, which irritates him, and begins looking for his own land to buy. As he is about to settle a deal to buy 1,300 acres for 1,500 rubles, he hears of the Bashkirs, who own huge swathes of land and sell it cheaply, from a traveler who recently purchased 13,000 acres for 1,000 rubles. Pahom decides to investigate the traveler's story.

Laden with gifts, Pahom arrives at the Bashkir village. As repayment for the gifts, Pahom asks the Bashkir chief for some of the tribe's land; the chief tells Pahom he can have as much land as he likes. Incredulous, Pahom asks the price:

'Our price is always the same: one thousand rubles a day.'

Pahom asks the chief for clarification, not understanding how the tribe will know what land belongs to him:

'Why, we shall go to any spot you like, and stay there. You must start from that spot and make your round, taking a spade with you. Wherever you think necessary, make a mark. At every turning, dig a hole and pile up the turf; then afterwards, we will go round with a plow from hole to hole. You may make as large a circuit as you please, but before the sun sets, you must return to the place you started from. All the land you cover will be yours.'

Pahom decides he will head out the next morning. He stays awake all night fantasizing about the land and how he will use it. Just before dawn, he dozes off and has a nightmare of the chief transforming into the traveler, the traveler transforming into the peasant, and finally, the peasant transforming into the Devil, who stands over a body, laughing. He awakens from the nightmare at daybreak and sets out with the tribe to a hillock where he will begin allocating his land.

Traversing the Bashkirs' hilly county, Pahom marks the boundary with the spade as the day passes, detouring to ensure more fertile areas are included in the boundary and that the land is correctly proportioned. Losing track of how far he has traveled, he hurriedly rushes back, climbing the steep hill to the starting point, arriving just as the sun sets. The Bashkirs cheer Pahom's good, but, exhausted from the run, Pahom drops dead. His servant buries him in an ordinary grave only six feet long, all the land one man needs.

== Cultural influence ==
Late in life, James Joyce wrote to his daughter Lucia that it is "the greatest story that the literature of the world knows"; Ludwig Wittgenstein was another well-known admirer. Motifs from the short story are used in the 1969 West German film Scarabea: How Much Land Does a Man Need? directed by Hans-Jürgen Syberberg. The story was adapted into a graphic novel by Martin Veyron.

"Zameen", an episode from the 1986 Indian anthology series Katha Sagar, was adapted from the story.

William Bennett included this story as part of a 1993 anthology titled The Book of Virtues.

Episode 9 of the Syrian satirical series Maraya was adapted from the story.

== See also ==
- Bibliography of Leo Tolstoy
- Twenty-Three Tales
