= The Coffee-House of Surat =

Short story by Leo Tolstoy

"The Coffee-House of Surat" (Russian: Суратская кофейная; also "A Surat Café") is a short story by Leo Tolstoy written in 1891, first published in Russian in 1893, and first published in English in 1901. Like several other of Tolstoy's works (e.g., The Port), this work is based on a French piece translated by Tolstoy himself, by Jacques-Henri Bernardin de Saint-Pierre. Due to the censorship in Russia, Tolstoy had to adjust the tale somewhat.

== Plot ==
The story takes place in Surat, India, where a single follower of Judaism, Hinduism, Protestantism, Catholicism, and Islam argue with each other about the true path to salvation, while a quiet Chinese man looks on without saying anything, the piece concluding when the followers turn to him and ask his opinion.

== Publication ==
This story is a chapter in the common Tolstoy compilation, Twenty Three Tales.

== See also ==
- Bibliography of Leo Tolstoy
- Twenty-Three Tales
