= The Marquis de Fumerol =

Short story by Guy de Maupassant

- Short story by Guy de Maupassant
- Original title: Le Marquis de Fumerol
- Country: France
- Language: French
- Genres: Short story, satire

Publication
- Published in: Gil Blas
- Publication type: Newspaper
- Media type: Print
- Publication date: January 17, 1887

"The Marquis de Fumerol" ( French: "Le Marquis de Fumerol") is a short story by French author Guy de Maupassant, first published in the newspaper Gil Blas on January 17, 1887. The story is a satirical commentary on the clash between religious tradition and secular values in 19th-century France.

== Plot summary ==
The story is narrated by Roger de Tourneville, who recounts the events surrounding the death of his uncle, the Marquis de Fumerol. The Marquis, an atheist and republican, is dying, and Roger's parents are determined to have him receive the last rites to avoid scandal.

Roger, his mother, and a priest named Abbe Poivron attempt to visit the dying Marquis. They encounter various obstacles, including the Marquis's servant Melanie and two young women who are with him. Despite their efforts, the Marquis initially refuses to see the priest.

The situation becomes farcical when a Protestant minister also attempts to visit the Marquis, leading to a comical confrontation. Eventually, the Marquis dies, and Roger's mother believes he recognized her in his final moments.

The story concludes with a grand funeral for the Marquis, complete with speeches praising his return to faith, despite the reality of the situation.

== Themes ==
"The Marquis de Fumerol" explores several themes:

- The hypocrisy of social conventions
- The conflict between traditional religious values and secular ideals
- The absurdity of death rituals
- The lengths people will go to maintain appearances
- The satirical portrayal of the aristocracy and clergy

== Literary significance and reception ==
The story is considered one of Maupassant's satirical masterpieces, showcasing his wit and keen observation of societal norms. It exemplifies his ability to blend humor with social commentary, a characteristic that made him one of the most popular short story writers of his time.

== Publication history ==
"The Marquis de Fumerol" was first published in the newspaper Gil Blas on January 17, 1887. It was later included in Maupassant's short story collection La Main gauche in 1889. The story has since been republished in various collections and as a standalone work.

== Adaptations ==
=== Television ===
The story was adapted for an episode of the Indian television series Katha Sagar ("A Sea of Stories"), which aired on DD National in 1986. The episode, titled "Zamana" (meaning "Era" or "Times" in Hindi), was directed by A. Salam and based on "The Marquis de Fumerol". Katha Sagar featured adaptations of stories by international authors including Katherine Mansfield, Leo Tolstoy, O. Henry, and Anton Chekhov.

=== Other media ===
- The story has been adapted into audiobook format and is available on various platforms.
- An illustration for "The Marquis de Fumerol" was created by Jean-François Raffaëlli as part of a series of illustrations for Maupassant's stories.
