= List of Jackanory episodes =

Jackanory was a BBC children's television series, which was originally broadcast from 13 December 1965 to 24 March 1996. The show's format was designed to stimulate an interest in reading, and usually involved an actor reading an abridged version of a children's novel or folk tale whilst seated in an armchair. A single book would usually occupy five daily fifteen-minute episodes from Monday to Friday, and occasionally the scene being read would be illustrated by a specially commissioned still drawing.

== 1965 ==
Episode	Story	Written by	Read by	Original air date
1	Cap of Rushes	Traditional English tale	Lee Montague	13-Dec-65
2	Mr. and Mrs. Vinegar	Traditional English tale	Lee Montague	14-Dec-65
3	Master of All Masters	Traditional English tale	Lee Montague	15-Dec-65
4	Tom Thumb	Traditional English tale	Lee Montague	16-Dec-65
5	Dick Whittington	Traditional English tale	Lee Montague	17-Dec-65
6	The Squirrel, the Hare, and the Little Grey Rabbit	Alison Uttley	Wendy Hiller	20-Dec-65
7	How Little Grey Rabbit Got Back Her Tail	Alison Uttley	Wendy Hiller	21-Dec-65
8	Wise Owl's Story	Alison Uttley	Wendy Hiller	22-Dec-65
9	Squirrel Goes Skating	Alison Uttley	Wendy Hiller	23-Dec-65
10	Little Grey Rabbit's Christmas	Alison Uttley	Wendy Hiller	24-Dec-65
11	Christmas Stories: Presents	Brian Way		27-Dec-65
12	Christmas Stories: Lights	Brian Way		28-Dec-65
13	Christmas Stories: Glass	Brian Way		29-Dec-65
14	Christmas Stories: Bells	Brian Way		30-Dec-65
15	Christmas Stories: Time	Brian Way		31-Dec-65

== 1966 ==
Episode	Story	Written by	Read by	Original air date
16	The Snow Queen: Part 1 - Kay and Gerda	Hans Christian Andersen	Enid Lorimer	3-Jan-66
17	The Snow Queen: Part 2 - Gerda and the Magic Flower Garden	Hans Christian Andersen	Enid Lorimer	4-Jan-66
18	The Snow Queen: Part 3 - The Crow's Castle	Hans Christian Andersen	Enid Lorimer	5-Jan-66
19	The Snow Queen: Part 4 - The Robber Girl	Hans Christian Andersen	Enid Lorimer	6-Jan-66
20	The Snow Queen: Part 5 - The End of the Story	Hans Christian Andersen	Enid Lorimer	7-Jan-66
21	The Wonderful Tar Baby	Traditional African tale	George Browne	10-Jan-66
22	Brer Rabbit Makes a Fool of Brer Fox	Traditional African tale	George Browne	11-Jan-66
23	Brer Rabbit Steals the Peas	Traditional African tale	George Browne	12-Jan-66
24	Brer Fox Goes Calling on Mrs. Goose	Traditional African tale	George Browne	13-Jan-66
25	Brer Rabbit Goes Shopping	Traditional African tale	George Browne	14-Jan-66
26	Mary Poppins Comes Back: Part 1 - The Kite	P. L. Travers	Hattie Jacques	17-Jan-66
27	Mary Poppins Comes Back: Part 2 - Topsy-Turvy	P. L. Travers	Hattie Jacques	18-Jan-66
28	Mary Poppins Comes Back: Part 3 - The Evening Out	P. L. Travers	Hattie Jacques	19-Jan-66
29	Mary Poppins Comes Back: Part 4 - Balloons and Balloons	P. L. Travers	Hattie Jacques	20-Jan-66
30	Mary Poppins Comes Back: Part 5 - Merry-Go-Round	P. L. Travers	Hattie Jacques	21-Jan-66
31	High Tobyman		Patrick Boyle	24-Jan-66
32	The London Rider		Patrick Boyle	25-Jan-66
33	A Purse of Gold		Patrick Boyle	26-Jan-66
34	The Smugglers at the White Horse		Patrick Boyle	27-Jan-66
35	The Arundel Flyer		Patrick Boyle	28-Jan-66
36	The Musicians of Bremen Town	Brothers Grimm	Dilys Hamlett	31-Jan-66
37	The Frog Prince	Brothers Grimm	Dilys Hamlett	1-Feb-66
38	The Goose Girl	Brothers Grimm	Dilys Hamlett	2-Feb-66
39	Rumpelstiltskin	Brothers Grimm	Dilys Hamlett	3-Feb-66
40	The Twelve Dancing Princesses	Brothers Grimm	Dilys Hamlett	4-Feb-66
41	Gulliver Starts on His Travels	Jonathan Swift	Alfred Marks	7-Feb-66
42	Trouble in Lilliput	Jonathan Swift	Alfred Marks	8-Feb-66
43	Lost on Brobdingnag	Jonathan Swift	Alfred Marks	9-Feb-66
44	The Island of Horses	Jonathan Swift	Alfred Marks	10-Feb-66
45	Gulliver in Space	J. G. Ballard	Alfred Marks	11-Feb-66
46	The Tale of Little Pig Robinson	Beatrix Potter	Margaret Rutherford	14-Feb-66
47	The Tale of Mrs. Tiggy-Winkle	Beatrix Potter	Margaret Rutherford	15-Feb-66
48	The Tale of Johnny Town-Mouse	Beatrix Potter	Margaret Rutherford	16-Feb-66
49	The Tale of Mr. Tod	Beatrix Potter	Margaret Rutherford	17-Feb-66
50	The Tale of Beatrix Potter	Beatrix Potter	Margaret Rutherford	18-Feb-66
51	The Spider's Palace	Richard Hughes	Gordon Rollings	21-Feb-66
52	The Dark Child	Richard Hughes	Gordon Rollings	22-Feb-66
53	Living in W'ales	Richard Hughes	Gordon Rollings	23-Feb-66
54	The Magic Glass	Richard Hughes	Gordon Rollings	24-Feb-66
55	The Invitation	Richard Hughes	Gordon Rollings	25-Feb-66
56	Finn Family Moomintroll: Part 1 - The Hobgoblin's Hat	Tove Jansson	Mai Zetterling	28-Feb-66
57	Finn Family Moomintroll: Part 2 - Moomintroll is Changed	Tove Jansson	Mai Zetterling	1-Mar-66
58	Finn Family Moomintroll: Part 3 - An Excursion to Lonely Island	Tove Jansson	Mai Zetterling	2-Mar-66
59	Finn Family Moomintroll: Part 4 - Snork Maiden's Discovery	Tove Jansson	Mai Zetterling	3-Mar-66
60	Finn Family Moomintroll: Part 5 - The Hobgoblin's Wishes	Tove Jansson	Mai Zetterling	4-Mar-66
61	The Cutty Sark		Bob Roberts	7-Mar-66
62	Foggy Weather		Bob Roberts	8-Mar-66
63	The Mystery of the 'Mary Celeste'		Bob Roberts	9-Mar-66
64	The Lighthouse Keeper's Daughter		Bob Roberts	10-Mar-66
65	A Duel at Sea		Bob Roberts	11-Mar-66
66	Please Look After This Bear	Michael Bond	Thora Hird	14-Mar-66
67	A Bear in Hot Water	Michael Bond	Thora Hird	15-Mar-66
68	Paddington Goes Underground	Michael Bond	Thora Hird	16-Mar-66
69	A Shopping Expedition	Michael Bond	Thora Hird	17-Mar-66
70	A Disappearing Trick	Michael Bond	Thora Hird	18-Mar-66
71	The Legend of Perseus: Part 1 - The Sword, the Shield and the Sandals	Ancient Greek mythology	Compton Mackenzie	21-Mar-66
72	The Legend of Perseus: Part 2 - The Head of Medusa	Ancient Greek mythology	Compton Mackenzie	22-Mar-66
73	The Legend of Perseus: Part 3 - Andromeda and the Sea Monster	Ancient Greek mythology	Compton Mackenzie	23-Mar-66
74	The Legend of Theseus: Part 1 - Return to Attica	Ancient Greek mythology	Compton Mackenzie	24-Mar-66
75	The Legend of Theseus: Part 2 - The Labyrinth	Ancient Greek mythology	Compton Mackenzie	25-Mar-66
76	The Happy Lion	Louise Fatio	Bridget Searle	28-Mar-66
77	The Happy Lion Roars	Louise Fatio	Bridget Searle	29-Mar-66
78	The Three Happy Lions	Louise Fatio	Bridget Searle	30-Mar-66
79	The Happy Lion in Africa	Louise Fatio	Bridget Searle	31-Mar-66
80	Emil and the Detectives: Part 1 - The Journey	Erich Kästner	Lee Montague	4-Apr-66
81	Emil and the Detectives: Part 2 - Alone in Berlin	Erich Kästner	Lee Montague	5-Apr-66
82	Emil and the Detectives: Part 3 - The Detectives	Erich Kästner	Lee Montague	6-Apr-66
83	Emil and the Detectives: Part 4 - Lying in Wait	Erich Kästner	Lee Montague	7-Apr-66
84	Emil and the Detectives: Part 5 - Saved by a Pinprick	Erich Kästner	Lee Montague	8-Apr-66
85	The Little Mermaid: Part 1 - Kingdom Under the Sea	Hans Christian Andersen	Enid Lorimer	12-Apr-66
86	The Little Mermaid: Part 2 - The Shipwreck	Hans Christian Andersen	Enid Lorimer	13-Apr-66
87	The Little Mermaid: Part 3 - The Sea Witch	Hans Christian Andersen	Enid Lorimer	14-Apr-66
88	The Little Mermaid: Part 4 - The Cold Sea	Hans Christian Andersen	Enid Lorimer	15-Apr-66
89	The Faery Flag of Dunvegan	Traditional Scottish tale	James Robertson Justice	18-Apr-66
90	The Battle of the Birds	Traditional Scottish tale	James Robertson Justice	19-Apr-66
91	Diarmid of the Shield	Traditional Scottish tale	James Robertson Justice	20-Apr-66
92	The Soldier's Tale	Traditional Scottish tale	James Robertson Justice	21-Apr-66
93	The Black Bull of Norroway	Traditional Scottish tale	James Robertson Justice	22-Apr-66
94	The Golliwogg's Bicycle Club	Florence Kate Upton	Dilys Hamlett	25-Apr-66
95	The Golliwogg's Polar Adventures	Florence Kate Upton	Dilys Hamlett	26-Apr-66
96	The Golliwogg's Air Ship	Florence Kate Upton	Dilys Hamlett	27-Apr-66
97	The Golliwogg in Holland	Florence Kate Upton	Dilys Hamlett	28-Apr-66
98	The Golliwogg at the Seaside	Florence Kate Upton	Dilys Hamlett	29-Apr-66
99	The Lion		Ronald Eyre	2-May-66
100	The Donkey		Ronald Eyre	3-May-66
101	The Wren		Ronald Eyre	4-May-66
102	The Hare		Ronald Eyre	5-May-66
103	The Tiger, the Monkey, the Snake, the Goldsmith and the Poor Scholar		Ronald Eyre	6-May-66
104	Bed-Knob and Broomstick: Part 1 - Riding on a Broomstick	Mary Norton	Jean Anderson	9-May-66
105	Bed-Knob and Broomstick: Part 2 - A Witch's Workroom	Mary Norton	Jean Anderson	10-May-66
106	Bed-Knob and Broomstick: Part 3 - Magic at the Police Station	Mary Norton	Jean Anderson	11-May-66
107	Bed-Knob and Broomstick: Part 4 - The Island of Ueepe	Mary Norton	Jean Anderson	12-May-66
108	Bed-Knob and Broomstick: Part 5 - Saved by the Broomstick	Mary Norton	Jean Anderson	13-May-66
109	The Sleeping Beauty in the Woods		Michel Saint-Denis	16-May-66
110	Puss in Boots	Traditional Italian tale	Michel Saint-Denis	17-May-66
111	The Old Woman at the Well		Michel Saint-Denis	18-May-66
112	Riquet of the Tuft	Traditional French tale	Michel Saint-Denis	19-May-66
113	The Little Glass Slipper		Michel Saint-Denis	20-May-66
114	Charlotte's Web: Part 1 - Introducing Wilbur	E. B. White	Caroline Benn	23-May-66
115	Charlotte's Web: Part 2 - Wilbur Meets Charlotte	E. B. White	Caroline Benn	24-May-66
116	Charlotte's Web: Part 3 - The Miracle	E. B. White	Caroline Benn	25-May-66
117	Charlotte's Web: Part 4 - Wilbur Feels Radiant	E. B. White	Caroline Benn	26-May-66
118	Charlotte's Web: Part 5 - The Country Fair and After	E. B. White	Caroline Benn	27-May-66
119	Orlando the Marmalade Cat: A Camping Holiday	Kathleen Hale	Charles Leno	30-May-66
120	Orlando's Evening Out	Kathleen Hale	Charles Leno	31-May-66
121	Orlando's Invisible Pyjamas	Kathleen Hale	Charles Leno	1-Jun-66
122	A Trip Abroad	Kathleen Hale	Charles Leno	2-Jun-66
123	Orlando Buys a Farm	Kathleen Hale	Charles Leno	3-Jun-66
124	The Green Kitten	Eleanor Farjeon	Eileen Colwell	6-Jun-66
125	Bertha Goldfoot	Eleanor Farjeon	Eileen Colwell	7-Jun-66
126	The Little Lady's Roses	Eleanor Farjeon	Eileen Colwell	8-Jun-66
127	Nella's Dancing Shoes	Eleanor Farjeon	Eileen Colwell	9-Jun-66
128	Elsie Piddock Skips in Her Sleep	Eleanor Farjeon	Eileen Colwell	10-Jun-66
129	Brer Rabbit Steals the Goober Peas	Traditional African tale	George Browne	13-Jun-66
130	Brer Rabbit Makes a Fool of Brer Fox	Traditional African tale	George Browne	15-Jun-66
131	Five Children and It: Part 1 - Not Like Any Fairy You Ever Saw	E. Nesbit	Rosalind Knight	20-Jun-66
132	Five Children and It: Part 2 - I Don't See How We're Going to Spend It All!	E. Nesbit	Rosalind Knight	21-Jun-66
133	Five Children and It: Part 3 - Is That the Whole Truth?	E. Nesbit	Rosalind Knight	22-Jun-66
134	Five Children and It: Part 4 - I Won't Answer for Him When the Sun Sets!	E. Nesbit	Rosalind Knight	23-Jun-66
135	Five Children and It: Part 5 - Leave Me Go, or I'll Bite	E. Nesbit	Rosalind Knight	24-Jun-66
136	Pegasus the Winged Avenger	Ancient Greek mythology	Harry H. Corbett	27-Jun-66
137	Bayard the Charger	Traditional French tale	Harry H. Corbett	28-Jun-66
138	The Horses of the Foolish People	Traditional Apache tale	Harry H. Corbett	29-Jun-66
139	The Wish Horse	Roger Price	Harry H. Corbett	30-Jun-66
140	The Magic Fishbone	Charles Dickens	Anna Massey	4-Jul-66
141	Princess September	Somerset Maugham	Anna Massey	5-Jul-66
142	The Princess and the Vagabond		Anna Massey	6-Jul-66
143	The Potted Princess	Rudyard Kipling	Anna Massey	7-Jul-66
144	The Toy Princess		Anna Massey	8-Jul-66
145	The Story of Beowulf: Part 1 - The Great Hall of the Danes	Traditional Old English tale	Stratford Johns	11-Jul-66
146	The Story of Beowulf: Part 2 - Beowulf Challenges the Demon	Traditional Old English tale	Stratford Johns	12-Jul-66
147	The Story of Beowulf: Part 3 - I Will Fight the Demon Without a Sword	Traditional Old English tale	Stratford Johns	13-Jul-66
148	The Story of Beowulf: Part 4 - The Demon Woman	Traditional Old English tale	Stratford Johns	14-Jul-66
149	The Story of Beowulf: Part 5 - Home Across the Sea	Traditional Old English tale	Stratford Johns	15-Jul-66
150	Ameliaranne Goes Digging	Lorna Wood	Sheila Hancock	18-Jul-66
151	Ameliaranne Camps Out	Lorna Wood	Sheila Hancock	19-Jul-66
152	Ameliaranne Bridesmaid	Lorna Wood	Sheila Hancock	20-Jul-66
153	Ameliaranne Moving-Day	Lorna Wood	Sheila Hancock	21-Jul-66
154	Ameliaranne and the Green Umbrella	Lorna Wood	Sheila Hancock	22-Jul-66
155	The Battle of the Giants	Traditional Swiss tale	Carl Schell	25-Jul-66
156	Three Strange Men	Traditional Swiss tale	Carl Schell	26-Jul-66
157	The Legend of William Tell	Traditional Swiss tale	Carl Schell	27-Jul-66
158	The Conspiracy of the Red Sleeves	Traditional Swiss tale	Carl Schell	28-Jul-66
159	The King of the Bears	Traditional Swiss tale	Carl Schell	29-Jul-66
160	Rupert and the Lost Cuckoo	Alfred Bestall	Phyllida Law	30-Aug-66
161	Rupert and the Fairy Child	Alfred Bestall	Phyllida Law	31-Aug-66
162	Rupert and the Compass	Alfred Bestall	Phyllida Law	1-Sep-66
163	Rupert and the Rockpool	Alfred Bestall	Phyllida Law	2-Sep-66
164	Our Marie	Stories from the Music hall	Ted Ray	5-Sep-66
165	Dan Leno: The Funniest Man on Earth	Stories from the Music hall	Ted Ray	6-Sep-66
166	Before the Black and White Minstrels	Stories from the Music hall	Ted Ray	7-Sep-66
167	Sing Us a Song, Florrie	Stories from the Music hall	Ted Ray	8-Sep-66
168	Gus Elen: The Costermonger	Stories from the Music hall	Ted Ray	9-Sep-66
169	The Fisherman's Gift	Traditional Japanese Tale	Setsuko Ito	12-Sep-66
170	The Greedy Weasel	Traditional Japanese Tale	Setsuko Ito	13-Sep-66
171	The Moon Child	Traditional Japanese Tale	Setsuko Ito	14-Sep-66
172	The Special Sparrow	Traditional Japanese Tale	Setsuko Ito	15-Sep-66
173	The Dancing Tea Kettle	Traditional Japanese Tale	Setsuko Ito	16-Sep-66
174	Gumphlumph: Part 1 - The Thing in the Wood	Stratford Johns		19-Sep-66
175	Gumphlumph: Part 2 - The Wicked Impresario	Stratford Johns		20-Sep-66
176	Gumphlumph: Part 3 - A Cold in the Head	Stratford Johns		21-Sep-66
177	Gumphlumph: Part 4 - Men in Black	Stratford Johns		22-Sep-66
178	Gumphlumph: Part 5 - Into Space	Stratford Johns		23-Sep-66
179	Just So Stories: The Cat That Walked by Himself	Rudyard Kipling	Enid Lorimer	26-Sep-66
180	Just So Stories: The Sing-Song of Old Man Kangaroo	Rudyard Kipling	Enid Lorimer	27-Sep-66
181	Just So Stories: The Elephant's Child	Rudyard Kipling	Enid Lorimer	28-Sep-66
182	Just So Stories: How the Camel Got His Hump/How the Rhinoceros Got His Skin	Rudyard Kipling	Enid Lorimer	29-Sep-66
183	Just So Stories: The Butterfly That Stamped	Rudyard Kipling	Enid Lorimer	30-Sep-66
184	Minnow on the Say: Part 1 - Lost Treasure	Philippa Pearce	Dinsdale Landen	3-Oct-66
185	Minnow on the Say: Part 2 - The Rhyming Clue	Philippa Pearce	Dinsdale Landen	4-Oct-66
186	Minnow on the Say: Part 3 - Over the Water	Philippa Pearce	Dinsdale Landen	5-Oct-66
187	Minnow on the Say: Part 4 - The Secret of the Single Rose	Philippa Pearce	Dinsdale Landen	6-Oct-66
188	Minnow on the Say: Part 5 - Philip Comes Again	Philippa Pearce	Dinsdale Landen	7-Oct-66
189	The Donegal Thorn Tree	Traditional Irish tale	Maureen Potter	10-Oct-66
190	Prince Liam and the Wolf Hounds	Traditional Irish tale	Maureen Potter	11-Oct-66
191	The Giant's Wife	Traditional Irish tale	Maureen Potter	12-Oct-66
192	Hudden and Dudden and Donald O'Neary	Traditional Irish tale	Maureen Potter	13-Oct-66
193	The Tailor from Galway	Traditional Irish tale	Maureen Potter	14-Oct-66
194	Little Tim and the Brave Sea Captain	Edward Ardizzone		17-Oct-66
195	Tim and Lucy Go to Sea	Edward Ardizzone		18-Oct-66
196	Tim and Ginger	Edward Ardizzone		19-Oct-66
197	Tim and Charlotte	Edward Ardizzone		20-Oct-66
198	Tim All Alone	Edward Ardizzone		21-Oct-66
199	The Little House in the Big Wood: Part 1 - Stocking Up for Winter	Laura Ingalls Wilder	Red Shiveley	24-Oct-66
200	The Little House in the Big Wood: Part 2 - Out in the Dark	Laura Ingalls Wilder	Red Shiveley	25-Oct-66
201	The Little House in the Big Wood: Part 3 - The Sugar Snow	Laura Ingalls Wilder	Red Shiveley	26-Oct-66
202	The Little House in the Big Wood: Part 4 - Yankee Doodle Went to Town	Laura Ingalls Wilder	Red Shiveley	27-Oct-66
203	The Little House in the Big Wood: Part 5 - A Long Time Ago	Laura Ingalls Wilder	Red Shiveley	28-Oct-66
204	The Green Witch		Jon Pertwee	31-Oct-66
205	The Talking Cat	Natalie Savage Carlson	Jon Pertwee	1-Nov-66
206	The Enchanted Children	Vivian T. Pomeroy	Jon Pertwee	2-Nov-66
207	The Clock That Wasn't There	Eileen Colwell	Jon Pertwee	3-Nov-66
208	Who Is Tom Tildrum?		Jon Pertwee	4-Nov-66
209	Little Old Mrs. Pepperpot	Alf Prøysen	Ann Way	7-Nov-66
210	Queen of the Crows	Alf Prøysen	Ann Way	8-Nov-66
211	Mrs. Pepperpot Buys Macaroni	Alf Prøysen	Ann Way	9-Nov-66
212	Mrs. Pepperpot Tries to Please Her Husband	Alf Prøysen	Ann Way	10-Nov-66
213	The Ski-Race	Alf Prøysen	Ann Way	11-Nov-66
214	The Monkeys and the Ogre	Traditional Indian Tale	Anita Seal	21-Nov-66
215	The Crocodile and the Jackal	Traditional Indian Tale	Anita Seal	22-Nov-66
216	The Man Who Rode a Tiger	Traditional Indian Tale	Anita Seal	23-Nov-66
217	The Bear's Bad Bargain	Traditional Indian Tale	Anita Seal	24-Nov-66
218	Terror the Hallowed Horse	Traditional Indian Tale	Anita Seal	25-Nov-66
219	The Barrow Lane Gang: Pretty Christmas	Noel Streatfeild	Rodney Bewes	28-Nov-66
220	The Barrow Lane Gang: The Hide	Noel Streatfeild	Rodney Bewes	29-Nov-66
221	The Barrow Lane Gang: Alfred	Noel Streatfeild	Rodney Bewes	30-Nov-66
222	The Barrow Lane Gang: Buried Treasure	Noel Streatfeild	Rodney Bewes	1-Dec-66
223	The Barrow Lane Gang: False Whiskers	Noel Streatfeild	Rodney Bewes	2-Dec-66
224	Golliwogg in the African Jungle	Florence Kate Upton	Dilys Hamlett	5-Dec-66
225	The Golliwogg's Air-Ship	Florence Kate Upton	Dilys Hamlett	6-Dec-66
226	The Golliwogg's Circus	Florence Kate Upton	Dilys Hamlett	7-Dec-66
227	The Golliwogg's Polar Adventure	Florence Kate Upton	Dilys Hamlett	8-Dec-66
228	The Golliwogg's Christmas	Florence Kate Upton	Dilys Hamlett	9-Dec-66
229	Jack the Giant-Killer	Traditional English tale	Lee Montague	12-Dec-66
230	Lucky Jack		Lee Montague	13-Dec-66
231	Prince Jack		Lee Montague	14-Dec-66
232	Lazy Jack		Lee Montague	15-Dec-66
233	Jack and the Beanstalk	Traditional English tale	Lee Montague	16-Dec-66
234	The Children of Green Knowe: Part 1 - Arrival at Green Knowe	Lucy M. Boston	Susannah York	19-Dec-66
235	The Children of Green Knowe: Part 2 - Hide and Seek	Lucy M. Boston	Susannah York	20-Dec-66
236	The Children of Green Knowe: Part 3 - Alexander's Flute	Lucy M. Boston	Susannah York	21-Dec-66
237	The Children of Green Knowe: Part 4 - Green Noah	Lucy M. Boston	Susannah York	22-Dec-66
238	The Children of Green Knowe: Part 5 - Christmas at Green Knowe	Lucy M. Boston	Susannah York	23-Dec-66
239	Harlequinade/Black Beard the Pirate		Bernard Cribbins	27-Dec-66
240	Cinderella, or The Little Glass Slipper		Bernard Cribbins	28-Dec-66
241	Black-Eyed Susan: A Tale of the Sea		Bernard Cribbins	29-Dec-66
242	Aladdin, or The Wonderful Lamp		Bernard Cribbins	30-Dec-66

== 1967 ==
Episode	Story	Written by	Read by	Original air date
243	Tales of the Arabian Nights: The Fisherman and the Genie	Traditional Middle Eastern tale	Natasha Parry	2-Jan-67
244	Tales of the Arabian Nights: The Young King of the Black Isles	Traditional Middle Eastern tale	Natasha Parry	3-Jan-67
245	Tales of the Arabian Nights: Prince Ahmed and the Fairy Queen	Traditional Middle Eastern tale	Natasha Parry	4-Jan-67
246	Tales of the Arabian Nights: The Young Cadi	Traditional Middle Eastern tale	Natasha Parry	5-Jan-67
247	Tales of the Arabian Nights: The Magic Horse	Traditional Middle Eastern tale	Natasha Parry	6-Jan-67
248	The Tailor of Gloucester	Beatrix Potter	George Melly	9-Jan-67
249	The Tale of Benjamin Bunny	Beatrix Potter	George Melly	10-Jan-67
250	The Tale of Samuel Whiskers	Beatrix Potter	George Melly	11-Jan-67
251	The Tale of Mrs. Tittlemouse	Beatrix Potter	George Melly	12-Jan-67
252	The Tale of Jemima Puddleduck	Beatrix Potter	George Melly	13-Jan-67
253	Marooned in Alaska		Tony Smythe	23-Jan-67
254	Prisoner in the Tower		Tony Smythe	24-Jan-67
255	Escape to Freedom		Tony Smythe	25-Jan-67
256	Emperor of Elba		Tony Smythe	26-Jan-67
257	Across the Ice		Tony Smythe	27-Jan-67
258	The Little White Horse: Part 1 - The Merryweathers of Moonacre	Elizabeth Goudge	Daphne Slater	30-Jan-67
259	The Little White Horse: Part 2 - The Ghost of Sir Wrolf	Elizabeth Goudge	Daphne Slater	31-Jan-67
260	The Little White Horse: Part 3 - The Iron Sword	Elizabeth Goudge	Daphne Slater	1-Feb-67
261	The Little White Horse: Part 4 - The Castle in the Pinewoods	Elizabeth Goudge	Daphne Slater	2-Feb-67
262	The Little White Horse: Part 5 - Out of the Sea	Elizabeth Goudge	Daphne Slater	3-Feb-67
263	Rupert and the Robbers' Cave	Alfred Bestall	Rodney Bewes	6-Feb-67
264	Rupert and the Golden Acorn	Alfred Bestall	Rodney Bewes	7-Feb-67
265	Rupert and the River Rescue	Alfred Bestall	Rodney Bewes	8-Feb-67
266	Rupert and the Train Journey	Alfred Bestall	Rodney Bewes	9-Feb-67
267	Rupert and the Wind Whistle	Alfred Bestall	Rodney Bewes	10-Feb-67
268	Mary Poppins Opens the Door: The Fifth of November	P. L. Travers	Hattie Jacques	13-Feb-67
269	Mary Poppins Comes Back: Nellie-Rubina	P. L. Travers	Hattie Jacques	14-Feb-67
270	Mary Poppins Opens the Door: Mr. Twigley's Wishes	P. L. Travers	Hattie Jacques	15-Feb-67
271	Mary Poppins in the Park: The Children in the Story	P. L. Travers	Hattie Jacques	16-Feb-67
272	Mary Poppins Opens the Door: The Other Door	P. L. Travers	Hattie Jacques	17-Feb-67
273	The Bird Talisman: Part 1 - The Gift of the King	Henry Allen Wedgwood	Zia Mohyeddin	20-Feb-67
274	The Bird Talisman: Part 2 - The Gypsy Plot	Henry Allen Wedgwood	Zia Mohyeddin	21-Feb-67
275	The Bird Talisman: Part 3 - The Cadi's Daughter	Henry Allen Wedgwood	Zia Mohyeddin	22-Feb-67
276	The Bird Talisman: Part 4 - Danger in the Garden	Henry Allen Wedgwood	Zia Mohyeddin	23-Feb-67
277	The Bird Talisman: Part 5 - The Old King Returns	Henry Allen Wedgwood	Zia Mohyeddin	24-Feb-67
278	Hans Christian Andersen	Hans Christian Andersen	Nina van Pallandt	27-Feb-67
279	The Brave Tin Soldier	Hans Christian Andersen	Nina van Pallandt	28-Feb-67
280	The Pig Keeper	Hans Christian Andersen	Nina van Pallandt	1-Mar-67
281	The Emperor's Nightingale	Hans Christian Andersen	Nina van Pallandt	2-Mar-67
282	The Ugly Duckling	Hans Christian Andersen	Nina van Pallandt	3-Mar-67
283	The Turf-Cutter's Donkey: Part 1 - The Donkey Himself	Patricia Lynch	Siobhan McKenna	13-Mar-67
284	The Turf-Cutter's Donkey: Part 2 - A Hammer of Gold	Patricia Lynch	Siobhan McKenna	14-Mar-67
285	The Turf-Cutter's Donkey: Part 3 - The Man from the Bog	Patricia Lynch	Siobhan McKenna	15-Mar-67
286	The Turf-Cutter's Donkey: Part 4 - Four-Leafed Shamrocks	Patricia Lynch	Siobhan McKenna	16-Mar-67
287	The Turf-Cutter's Donkey: Part 5 - The Donkey's Secret	Patricia Lynch	Siobhan McKenna	17-Mar-67
288	Winnie-the-Pooh: Pooh and Some Bees	A. A. Milne	Ronald Eyre	20-Mar-67
289	Winnie-the-Pooh: Pooh Goes Visiting and Gets Into a Tight Place	A. A. Milne	Ronald Eyre	21-Mar-67
290	Winnie-the-Pooh: Piglet Meets a Heffalump	A. A. Milne	Ronald Eyre	22-Mar-67
291	Winnie-the-Pooh: Eeyore Loses a Tail and Pooh Finds One	A. A. Milne	Ronald Eyre	23-Mar-67
292	Winnie-the-Pooh: Kanga and Baby Roo	A. A. Milne	Ronald Eyre	24-Mar-67
293	The Phoenix and the Carpet: Part 1 - The Golden Egg	E. Nesbit	Rosalind Knight	27-Mar-67
294	The Phoenix and the Carpet: Part 2 - The Topless Tower	E. Nesbit	Rosalind Knight	28-Mar-67
295	The Phoenix and the Carpet: Part 3 - The Queen Cook	E. Nesbit	Rosalind Knight	29-Mar-67
296	The Phoenix and the Carpet: Part 4 - The Cats, the Cow and the Burglar	E. Nesbit	Rosalind Knight	30-Mar-67
297	The Phoenix and the Carpet: Part 5 - The End of It All	E. Nesbit	Rosalind Knight	31-Mar-67
298	Brer Rabbit Goes Fishing	Traditional African tale	George Browne	03-Apr-67
299	Brer Fox Goes After His Dinner	Traditional African tale	George Browne	04-Apr-67
300	Miss Meadows and the Gals	Traditional African tale	George Browne	05-Apr-67
301	Brer Wolf in Trouble	Traditional African tale	George Browne	06-Apr-67
302	Brer Fox and Brer Terrapin	Traditional African tale	George Browne	07-Apr-67
303	William and the Pop Group	Richmal Crompton	David Tomlinson	17-Apr-67
304	William Gets His Fairing	Richmal Crompton	David Tomlinson	18-Apr-67
305	The Knights of the Square Table	Richmal Crompton	David Tomlinson	19-Apr-67
306	William's Evening Out	Richmal Crompton	David Tomlinson	20-Apr-67
307	William's Treasure Trove	Richmal Crompton	David Tomlinson	21-Apr-67
308	The Lion, the Witch and the Wardrobe: Part 1 - Lucy Looks Into a Wardrobe	C. S. Lewis	Marian Diamond	24-Apr-67
309	The Lion, the Witch and the Wardrobe: Part 2 - Into the Forest	C. S. Lewis	Marian Diamond	25-Apr-67
310	The Lion, the Witch and the Wardrobe: Part 3 - The Spell Begins to Break	C. S. Lewis	Marian Diamond	26-Apr-67
311	The Lion, the Witch and the Wardrobe: Part 4 - Peter's First Battle	C. S. Lewis	Marian Diamond	27-Apr-67
312	The Lion, the Witch and the Wardrobe: Part 5 - Deeper Magic from Before the Dawn of Time	C. S. Lewis	Marian Diamond	28-Apr-67
313	Little Grey Rabbit's Washing Day	Alison Uttley	Jon Pertwee	01-May-67
314	Little Grey Rabbit and the Weasels	Alison Uttley	Jon Pertwee	02-May-67
315	Little Grey Rabbit Goes to the Sea	Alison Uttley	Jon Pertwee	03-May-67
316	Little Grey Rabbit Makes Lace	Alison Uttley	Jon Pertwee	04-May-67
317	Little Grey Rabbit's Birthday	Alison Uttley	Jon Pertwee	05-May-67
318	The Silver Chanter	Traditional Scottish tale	Wendy Wood	08-May-67
319	The Three Soldiers	Traditional Scottish tale	Wendy Wood	09-May-67
320	The Smith and the Fairies	Traditional Scottish tale	Wendy Wood	10-May-67
321	The Knight of Grianaig	Traditional Scottish tale	Wendy Wood	11-May-67
322	Black Colin of Loch Awe	Traditional Scottish tale	Wendy Wood	12-May-67
323	Family Tree: Part 1 - The Mutiny	Glynn Christian		15-May-67
324	Family Tree: Part 2 - In Search of Paradise	Glynn Christian		16-May-67
325	Family Tree: Part 3 - The Secret Island	Glynn Christian		17-May-67
326	Family Tree: Part 4 - The Children's Mutiny	Glynn Christian		18-May-67
327	Family Tree: Part 5 - Grandfather William and the Whale	Glynn Christian		19-May-67
328	The Cricket in Times Square: Part 1 - Mario	George Selden	Julie Felix	22-May-67
329	The Cricket in Times Square: Part 2 - Harry Cat	George Selden	Julie Felix	23-May-67
330	The Cricket in Times Square: Part 3 - The Chinese Dinner	George Selden	Julie Felix	24-May-67
331	The Cricket in Times Square: Part 4 - The Fire	George Selden	Julie Felix	25-May-67
332	The Cricket in Times Square: Part 5 - Fame and Farewell	George Selden	Julie Felix	26-May-67
333	The Spider's Palace	Richard Hughes	Bernard Cribbins	29-May-67
334	The Dark Child	Richard Hughes	Bernard Cribbins	30-May-67
335	Living in W'ales	Richard Hughes	Bernard Cribbins	31-May-67
336	The Magic Glass	Richard Hughes	Bernard Cribbins	01-Jun-67
337	The Invitation	Richard Hughes	Bernard Cribbins	02-Jun-67
338	Mrs. Pepperpot and the Moose	Alf Prøysen	Eileen Colwell	05-Jun-67
339	Mrs. Pepperpot Minds the Baby	Alf Prøysen	Eileen Colwell	06-Jun-67
340	Mrs. Pepperpot 's Penny Watchman	Alf Prøysen	Eileen Colwell	07-Jun-67
341	Mrs. Pepperpot to the Rescue	Alf Prøysen	Eileen Colwell	08-Jun-67
342	Mrs. Pepperpot Is Taken for a Witch	Alf Prøysen	Eileen Colwell	09-Jun-67
343	The Rainmakers	Traditional Chinese tale	Robert Ya Fu Lee	12-Jun-67
344	The Magpie Bridge	Traditional Chinese tale	Robert Ya Fu Lee	13-Jun-67
345	The Inn of Donkeys	Traditional Chinese tale	Robert Ya Fu Lee	14-Jun-67
346	The Tiger	Traditional Chinese tale	Robert Ya Fu Lee	15-Jun-67
347	The Dinner That Cooked Itself	Traditional Chinese tale	Robert Ya Fu Lee	16-Jun-67
348	Tales of Mr. Pengachoosa: The Snow House	Caroline Rush	Susan Hampshire	10-Jul-67
349	Tales of Mr. Pengachoosa: The Mermaid	Caroline Rush	Susan Hampshire	11-Jul-67
350	Tales of Mr. Pengachoosa: The Wind Birds	Caroline Rush	Susan Hampshire	12-Jul-67
351	Tales of Mr. Pengachoosa: The Seasons	Caroline Rush	Susan Hampshire	13-Jul-67
352	Tales of Mr. Pengachoosa: The Two Brothers	Caroline Rush	Susan Hampshire	14-Jul-67
353	Worzel Gummidge: Gummidge Goes for a Walk	Barbara Euphan Todd	Gordon Rollings	17-Jul-67
354	Worzel Gummidge: Gummidge's New Clothes	Barbara Euphan Todd	Gordon Rollings	18-Jul-67
355	Worzel Gummidge: Aunt Sally	Barbara Euphan Todd	Gordon Rollings	19-Jul-67
356	Worzel Gummidge: The Battle of the Scarecrows	Barbara Euphan Todd	Gordon Rollings	20-Jul-67
357	Worzel Gummidge: Gummidge Gives a Party	Barbara Euphan Todd	Gordon Rollings	21-Jul-67
358	The Story of Siegfried: Part 1 - The Horse and the Sword	Germanic mythology	Irene von Meyendorff	24-Jul-67
359	The Story of Siegfried: Part 2 - The Dragon and the Hoard of Gold	Germanic mythology	Irene von Meyendorff	25-Jul-67
360	The Story of Siegfried: Part 3 - Princess Kriemhild	Germanic mythology	Irene von Meyendorff	26-Jul-67
361	The Story of Siegfried: Part 4 - The Winning of Brunhilde	Germanic mythology	Irene von Meyendorff	27-Jul-67
362	The Story of Siegfried: Part 5 - The Betrayal of Siegfried	Germanic mythology	Irene von Meyendorff	28-Jul-67
363	An Adventure in Time: Part 1 - Travellers in Time	John Anderson	John Anderson	31-Jul-67
364	An Adventure in Time: Part 2 - Through the Ice	John Anderson	John Anderson	01-Aug-67
365	An Adventure in Time: Part 3 - Leif the Lucky	John Anderson	John Anderson	02-Aug-67
366	An Adventure in Time: Part 4 - Landfall in Vinland	John Anderson	John Anderson	03-Aug-67
367	An Adventure in Time: Part 5 - Vikings and Indians	John Anderson	John Anderson	04-Aug-67
368	Sara and Simon and No Red Paint	Edward Ardizzone	Mary Miller	07-Aug-67
369	Paul, the Hero of the Fire	Edward Ardizzone	Mary Miller	08-Aug-67
370	Johnny the Clockmaker	Edward Ardizzone	Mary Miller	09-Aug-67
371	Nicholas and the Fast-Moving Diesel	Edward Ardizzone	Mary Miller	10-Aug-67
372	Peter the Wanderer	Edward Ardizzone	Mary Miller	11-Aug-67
373	Tom's Midnight Garden: Part 1 - The Clock That Struck Thirteen	Philippa Pearce	Martin Jarvis	14-Aug-67
374	Tom's Midnight Garden: Part 2 - Hatty	Philippa Pearce	Martin Jarvis	15-Aug-67
375	Tom's Midnight Garden: Part 3 - Time in the Garden	Philippa Pearce	Martin Jarvis	16-Aug-67
376	Tom's Midnight Garden: Part 4 - A Pair of Skates	Philippa Pearce	Martin Jarvis	17-Aug-67
377	Tom's Midnight Garden: Part 5 - A Cry in the Dark	Philippa Pearce	Martin Jarvis	18-Aug-67
378	Italian Peepshow: Oranges and Lemons	Eleanor Farjeon	Kika Markham	21-Aug-67
379	Italian Peepshow: Rosaura's Birthday	Eleanor Farjeon	Kika Markham	22-Aug-67
380	Italian Peepshow: The King of Tripoli Brings the Pasta	Eleanor Farjeon	Kika Markham	23-Aug-67
381	Italian Peepshow: The Herb of Fear	Eleanor Farjeon	Kika Markham	24-Aug-67
382	Italian Peepshow: Nella's Dancing Shoes	Eleanor Farjeon	Kika Markham	25-Aug-67
383	The Coming of Maui	Traditional New Zealand Tale	Eugene Fraser	28-Aug-67
384	How Maui Fished Up the Land	Traditional New Zealand Tale	Eugene Fraser	29-Aug-67
385	How Maui Tamed the Sun	Traditional New Zealand Tale	Eugene Fraser	30-Aug-67
386	How Maui Slew the Great Sea Serpent	Traditional New Zealand Tale	Eugene Fraser	31-Aug-67
387	How Maui Captured the Sea and Created the Stars	Traditional New Zealand Tale	Eugene Fraser	01-Sep-67
388	I'm Not Wearing That	Alison Prince		04-Sep-67
389	Shelter Under the Cherry Tree	Alison Prince		05-Sep-67
390	Going Away from Home	Alison Prince		06-Sep-67
391	Everyone Had a Ration Book	Alison Prince		08-Sep-67
392	When the Lights Go on Again	Alison Prince		09-Sep-67
393	Rupert Goes Hiking	Alfred Bestall	Michael Gaunt	11-Sep-67
394	Rupert's Strange Adventure	Alfred Bestall	Michael Gaunt	12-Sep-67
395	Rupert and the Circus Clown	Alfred Bestall	Michael Gaunt	13-Sep-67
396	Rupert and the Black Dwarf	Alfred Bestall	Michael Gaunt	14-Sep-67
397	Rupert and the Lost Boat	Alfred Bestall	Michael Gaunt	15-Sep-67
398	Brother Dusty-Feet: The Joyous Company	Rosemary Sutcliff	Dilys Hamlett	18-Sep-67
399	Brother Dusty-Feet: A Fine Gentleman	Rosemary Sutcliff	Dilys Hamlett	19-Sep-67
400	Brother Dusty-Feet: Argos Lets Lost	Rosemary Sutcliff	Dilys Hamlett	20-Sep-67
401	Brother Dusty-Feet: The Mist Rises	Rosemary Sutcliff	Dilys Hamlett	21-Sep-67
402	Brother Dusty-Feet: Parting of the Ways	Rosemary Sutcliff	Dilys Hamlett	22-Sep-67
403	The Secret Name of Ra	Traditional Egyptian Tale	Samira Kirollos	02-Oct-67
404	The Betrayal of Osiris	Traditional Egyptian Tale	Samira Kirollos	03-Oct-67
405	The Quest of Isis	Traditional Egyptian Tale	Samira Kirollos	04-Oct-67
406	Osiris Finds a New Kingdom	Traditional Egyptian Tale	Samira Kirollos	05-Oct-67
407	The Revenge of Horus	Traditional Egyptian Tale	Samira Kirollos	06-Oct-67
408	The Search for the North-West Passage	Stories from Canada	Don Macklin	09-Oct-67
409	The Fur Traders	Stories from Canada	Don Macklin	10-Oct-67
410	Redskins and Red Jackets	Stories from Canada	Don Macklin	11-Oct-67
411	The Red River	Stories from Canada	Don Macklin	12-Oct-67
412	The Road Builders	Stories from Canada	Don Macklin	13-Oct-67
413	The Story of Babar	Jean de Brunhoff	Celia Johnson	16-Oct-67
414	Babar's Travels	Jean de Brunhoff	Celia Johnson	17-Oct-67
415	Babar the King	Jean de Brunhoff	Celia Johnson	18-Oct-67
416	Babar at Home	Jean de Brunhoff	Celia Johnson	19-Oct-67
417	Babar and Father Christmas	Jean de Brunhoff	Celia Johnson	20-Oct-67
418	A Handful of Thieves: The Sinister Lodger	Nina Bawden	Keith Barron	23-Oct-67
419	A Handful of Thieves: To Catch a Thief	Nina Bawden	Keith Barron	24-Oct-67
420	A Handful of Thieves: Burglars and Lilac Cottage	Nina Bawden	Keith Barron	25-Oct-67
421	A Handful of Thieves: A Visit to the Cinema	Nina Bawden	Keith Barron	26-Oct-67
422	A Handful of Thieves: Stop Thief!	Nina Bawden	Keith Barron	27-Oct-67
423	Sam Pig Goes to School	Alison Uttley	Dandy Nichols	30-Oct-67
424	Sam Pig's Day at the Farm	Alison Uttley	Dandy Nichols	31-Oct-67
425	Sam Pig's Treasure	Alison Uttley	Dandy Nichols	01-Nov-67
426	Sam Pig Goes to the Big House	Alison Uttley	Dandy Nichols	02-Nov-67
427	Sam Pig at the Circus	Alison Uttley	Dandy Nichols	03-Nov-67
428	The Story of Rhiannon	Traditional Welsh tale	Ray Smith	06-Nov-67
429	Where Arthur Sleeps	Traditional Welsh tale	Ray Smith	07-Nov-67
430	Prince Llewelyn and the Magician	Traditional Welsh tale	Ray Smith	08-Nov-67
431	The Lady of Llyn y Fan	Traditional Welsh tale	Ray Smith	09-Nov-67
432	The Fairy Bridge	Traditional Welsh tale	Ray Smith	10-Nov-67
433	Operation Noah	Susanne Hart		13-Nov-67
434	Ugas the Lion	Susanne Hart		14-Nov-67
435	A Rhinoceros Called Tinkerbell	Susanne Hart		15-Nov-67
436	The Fastest Animal on Earth	Susanne Hart		16-Nov-67
437	Elephant Doctor	Susanne Hart		17-Nov-67
438	Pinocchio	Carlo Collodi	Trevor Martin	20-Nov-67
439	Five Golden Guineas	Carlo Collodi	Trevor Martin	21-Nov-67
440	Pinocchio and The Money Tree	Carlo Collodi	Trevor Martin	22-Nov-67
441	Out of the Frying Pan...	Carlo Collodi	Trevor Martin	23-Nov-67
442	The Giant Dog Fish	Carlo Collodi	Trevor Martin	24-Nov-67
443	The Beauty and the Beast	Gabrielle-Suzanne de Villeneuve	Simon Ward	04-Dec-67
444	The Prince and the Frog		Simon Ward	05-Dec-67
445	The Prince and the Firebird		Simon Ward	06-Dec-67
446	Askeladden and His Helpful Assistants	Traditional Norwegian tale	Simon Ward	07-Dec-67
447	The Prince, Two Mice and Some Kitchen-Maids		Simon Ward	08-Dec-67
448	The Borrowers: Part 1	Mary Norton	Geraldine McEwan	11-Dec-67
449	The Borrowers: Part 2	Mary Norton	Geraldine McEwan	12-Dec-67
450	The Borrowers: Part 3	Mary Norton	Geraldine McEwan	13-Dec-67
451	The Borrowers: Part 4	Mary Norton	Geraldine McEwan	14-Dec-67
452	The Borrowers: Part 5	Mary Norton	Geraldine McEwan	15-Dec-67
453	The Selfish Giant	Oscar Wilde	Ronald Eyre	18-Dec-67
454	The Christmas Rocket	Anne Molloy	Anna Massey	19-Dec-67
455	The First Christmas in the New World		Glynn Christian	20-Dec-67
456	Baboushka		Celia Johnson	21-Dec-67
457	The Little Juggler		Ted Ray	22-Dec-67
458	The Christmas Tale of Sam Pig	Alison Uttley	Dandy Nichols	24-Dec-67
459	The Splendid History of Mother Goose and her Golden Eggs		Mike Hope and Alby Keen	25-Dec-67
460	The Incredible Saga of Sinbad the Sailor		Mike Hope and Alby Keen	26-Dec-67
461	The Fantastic, Fantabulous Story of Jack and the Beanstalk	Traditional English tale	Mike Hope and Alby Keen	27-Dec-67
462	The Thrilling Adventures of the Babes in the Wood		Mike Hope and Alby Keen	28-Dec-67
463	The Sensational, De-Light-Ful Story of Cinderella		Mike Hope and Alby Keen	29-Dec-67

== 1968 ==
Episode	Story	Written by	Read by	Original air date	
464	The Piemakers: A Pie for the King	Helen Cresswell	Wendy Craig	01-Jan-68	
465	The Piemakers: Fire Saves the Day	Helen Cresswell	Wendy Craig	02-Jan-68	
466	The Piemakers: The Great Pie	Helen Cresswell	Wendy Craig	03-Jan-68	
467	The Piemakers: The Biggest Pie-Dish in the World	Helen Cresswell	Wendy Craig	04-Jan-68	
468	The Piemakers: The Contest	Helen Cresswell	Wendy Craig	05-Jan-68	
469	Arthur's Last Battle	Traditional Cornish Tale	John Ebdon	08-Jan-68	
470	The Mermaid of Zennor	Traditional Cornish Tale	John Ebdon	09-Jan-68	
471	The Giant's Hedges	Traditional Cornish Tale	John Ebdon	10-Jan-68	
472	Tom Trevorrow and the Knockers	Traditional Cornish Tale	John Ebdon	11-Jan-68	
473	John Carter 'King of Prussia'	Traditional Cornish Tale	John Ebdon	12-Jan-68	
474	Pippi Comes to Villekulla Cottage	Astrid Lindgren	Joyce Grenfell	15-Jan-68	
475	Pippi Plays Tig with Policemen	Astrid Lindgren	Joyce Grenfell	16-Jan-68	
476	Pippi Arranges a Picnic	Astrid Lindgren	Joyce Grenfell	17-Jan-68	
477	Pippi Becomes a Heroine	Astrid Lindgren	Joyce Grenfell	18-Jan-68	
478	Pippi Goes to the Circus	Astrid Lindgren	Joyce Grenfell	19-Jan-68	
479	Anansi and the Tiger Stories	Akan Folk Tale	Charles Hyatt	22-Jan-68	
480	Anansi and the Cornfield	Akan Folk Tale	Charles Hyatt	23-Jan-68	
481	Anansi and the Bluebottle	Akan Folk Tale	Charles Hyatt	24-Jan-68	
482	Anansi Brings Home the Dinner	Akan Folk Tale	Charles Hyatt	25-Jan-68	
483	Anansi the Preacher	Akan Folk Tale	Charles Hyatt	26-Jan-68	
484	The Unwelcome Guests: The House on Its Own		Mollie Sugden	29-Jan-68	
485	The Unwelcome Guests: The Beachcombers		Mollie Sugden	30-Jan-68	
486	The Unwelcome Guests: The Golden Coin		Mollie Sugden	31-Jan-68	
487	The Unwelcome Guests: Lost and Found		Mollie Sugden	01-Feb-68	
488	The Unwelcome Guests: Welcome at Last		Mollie Sugden	02-Feb-68	
489	Charlie and the Chocolate Factory: Golden Tickets	Roald Dahl	Bernard Cribbins	05-Feb-68	
490	Charlie and the Chocolate Factory: Fudgemallow Delight	Roald Dahl	Bernard Cribbins	06-Feb-68	
491	Charlie and the Chocolate Factory: The Chocolate Room	Roald Dahl	Bernard Cribbins	07-Feb-68	
492	Charlie and the Chocolate Factory: A Shock for Veruca and Violet	Roald Dahl	Bernard Cribbins	08-Feb-68	
493	Charlie and the Chocolate Factory: A Surprise for Charlie	Roald Dahl	Bernard Cribbins	09-Feb-68	
494	Maria of Hungary		Mary Webster	12-Feb-68	
495	The First Elizabeth		Mary Webster	13-Feb-68	
496	Elizabeth of Orleans: The Wilful Princess		Mary Webster	14-Feb-68	
497	Victoria		Mary Webster	15-Feb-68	
498	A Princess Today		Mary Webster	16-Feb-68	
499	Kanchil and the Hollow Log		Marina Samad	26-Feb-68	
500	Kanchil Meets Rimau the Tiger		Marina Samad	27-Feb-68	
501	Kanchil and the Running Race		Marina Samad	28-Feb-68	
502	Kanchil Falls Into a Pit		Marina Samad	29-Feb-68	
503	Kanchil Meets Rajah Suleiman		Marina Samad	01-Mar-68	
504	Hereward the Wake	Folk Tale	Ian Hendry	04-Mar-68	
505	The Green Children	Kevin Crossley-Holland	Ian Hendry	05-Mar-68	
506	Stone Horse Plantation		Ian Hendry	06-Mar-68	
507	Tom Tit-Tot		Ian Hendry	07-Mar-68	
508	The Pedlar of Swaffham		Ian Hendry	08-Mar-68	
509	Prince Caspian: Part 1 - Return to Narnia	C. S. Lewis	Marian Diamond	11-Mar-68	
510	Prince Caspian: Part 2 - The Dwarf's Story	C. S. Lewis	Marian Diamond	12-Mar-68	
511	Prince Caspian: Part 3 - Old Narnia in Danger	C. S. Lewis	Marian Diamond	13-Mar-68	
512	Prince Caspian: Part 4 - The Lion Roars	C. S. Lewis	Marian Diamond	14-Mar-68	
513	Prince Caspian: Part 5 - Aslan Makes a Door in the Air	C. S. Lewis	Marian Diamond	15-Mar-68	
514	Destination Unknown: Have Motor, Will Travel!		Tony Smythe	18-Mar-68	
515	Destination Unknown: Green Gold		Tony Smythe	20-Mar-68	
516	Destination Unknown: Kon Tiki		Tony Smythe	21-Mar-68	
517	Destination Unknown: What Happened to Colonel Fawcett?		Tony Smythe	22-Mar-68	
518	Nurse Matilda: Nurse Matilda Arrives	Christianna Brand	Diana Graves	25-Mar-68	
519	Nurse Matilda: Fuddledutch	Christianna Brand	Diana Graves	26-Mar-68	
520	Nurse Matilda: Total War	Christianna Brand	Diana Graves	27-Mar-68	
521	Nurse Matilda: Greens for Lunch	Christianna Brand	Diana Graves	28-Mar-68	
522	Nurse Matilda: That Terrible Tooth	Christianna Brand	Diana Graves	29-Mar-68	
523	Grimble: Coconut Tart	Clement Freud		01-Apr-68	
524	Grimble: Eggs	Clement Freud		02-Apr-68	
525	Grimble: Potato Pancakes	Clement Freud		03-Apr-68	
526	Grimble: Chocolate Sauce	Clement Freud		04-Apr-68	
527	Grimble: Trifle à la Grimble	Clement Freud		05-Apr-68	
528	The Little Pony	Scandinavian Folk Tale	Lisa Langdon	08-Apr-68	
529	The Magic Scythe	Scandinavian Folk Tale	Lisa Langdon	09-Apr-68	
530	The Island of Sandfleas	Scandinavian Folk Tale	Lisa Langdon	10-Apr-68	
531	East of the Sun and North of the Earth	Scandinavian Folk Tale	Lisa Langdon	11-Apr-68	
532	Littlenose: Two-Eyes, the Mammoth	John Grant		15-Apr-68	
533	Littlenose: Shell Necklace	John Grant		16-Apr-68	
534	Littlenose: Great Elk	John Grant		17-Apr-68	
535	Littlenose: Straightnoses	John Grant		18-Apr-68	
536	Littlenose: Dozy	John Grant		19-Apr-68	
537	Spirit of the Mustard Pot		Isobel Black	22-Apr-68	
538	Queen of the Desert		Isobel Black	23-Apr-68	
539	Explorer in a Poke Bonnet		Isobel Black	24-Apr-68	
540	An Unusual Governess		Isobel Black	25-Apr-68	
541	The Aeroplane Girl		Isobel Black	26-Apr-68	
542	The Bookshop on the Quay: Part 1 - The Drover Who Didn't Come Back	Patricia Lynch	Billy Boyle	29-Apr-68	
543	The Bookshop on the Quay: Part 2 - The Road to Dublin	Patricia Lynch	Billy Boyle	30-Apr-68	
544	The Bookshop on the Quay: Part 3 - The Four Masters' Bookshop	Patricia Lynch	Billy Boyle	01-May-68	
545	The Bookshop on the Quay: Part 4 - Migeen	Patricia Lynch	Billy Boyle	02-May-68	
546	The Bookshop on the Quay: Part 5 - The Burning of the Books	Patricia Lynch	Billy Boyle	03-May-68	
547	Just So Stories: How the Whale Got His Throat	Rudyard Kipling	Elisabeth Welch	06-May-68	
548	Just So Stories: The Elephant's Child	Rudyard Kipling	Elisabeth Welch	07-May-68	
549	Just So Stories: The Crab That Played with the Sea	Rudyard Kipling	Elisabeth Welch	08-May-68	
550	Just So Stories: The Cat That Walked by Himself	Rudyard Kipling	Elisabeth Welch	09-May-68	
551	Just So Stories: The Beginning of the Armadilloes	Rudyard Kipling	Elisabeth Welch	10-May-68	
552	The Outlaw	Edward Blishen	Gilbert Wynne	13-May-68	
553	The Silver Arrow	Edward Blishen	Gilbert Wynne	14-May-68	
554	Friar Tuck	Edward Blishen	Gilbert Wynne	15-May-68	
555	The Butcher of Nottingham	Edward Blishen	Gilbert Wynne	16-May-68	
556	The Mysterious Pilgrim	Edward Blishen	Gilbert Wynne	17-May-68	
557	The Warden's Niece: Part 1 - Maria Escapes	Gillian Avery	Geraldine McEwan	20-May-68	
558	The Warden's Niece: Part 2 - Truth or Dare	Gillian Avery	Geraldine McEwan	21-May-68	
559	The Warden's Niece: Part 3 - A Bet on Maria	Gillian Avery	Geraldine McEwan	22-May-68	
560	The Warden's Niece: Part 4 - Bodley and the Bull	Gillian Avery	Geraldine McEwan	23-May-68	
561	The Warden's Niece: Part 5 - The End of Maria's Search	Gillian Avery	Geraldine McEwan	24-May-68	
562	How the Stars Were Made		John Ebdon	27-May-68	
563	The Stars That Never Set		John Ebdon	28-May-68	
564	The Swan		John Ebdon	29-May-68	
565	The Milky Way		John Ebdon	30-May-68	
566	Looking at the Moon		John Ebdon	31-May-68	
567	A Dog So Small: Part 1 - Grandfather's Promise	Philippa Pearce	Judi Dench	03-Jun-68	
568	A Dog So Small: Part 2 - A Dog Behind Glass	Philippa Pearce	Judi Dench	04-Jun-68	
569	A Dog So Small: Part 3 - Wolves Die by Hundreds	Philippa Pearce	Judi Dench	05-Jun-68	
570	A Dog So Small: Part 4 - Pig Sty in the Rain	Philippa Pearce	Judi Dench	06-Jun-68	
571	A Dog So Small: Part 5 - 'Bring Mrzzle for Jurney'	Philippa Pearce	Judi Dench	07-Jun-68	
572	Elidor: Thursday Street	Alan Garner	John Stride	10-Jun-68	
573	Elidor: Malebron of Elidor	Alan Garner	John Stride	11-Jun-68	
574	Elidor: Stat	Alan Garner	John Stride	12-Jun-68	
575	Elidor: The High Places	Alan Garner	John Stride	13-Jun-68	
576	Elidor: The Song of Findhorn	Alan Garner	John Stride	14-Jun-68	
577	The House at Pooh Corner: In Which a House Is Built at Pooh Corner for Eeyore (Note: Billed as 'Summer Jackanory')	A. A. Milne	Alan Bennett	12-Jul-68	
578	The House at Pooh Corner: Tigger Comes to Breakfast	A. A. Milne	Alan Bennett	19-Jul-68	
579	The House at Pooh Corner: Tiggers Don't Climb Trees	A. A. Milne	Alan Bennett	26-Jul-68	
580	The House at Pooh Corner: Rabbit's Busy Day	A. A. Milne	Alan Bennett	2-Aug-68	
581	The House at Pooh Corner: Pooh Invents a New Game	A. A. Milne	Alan Bennett	9-Aug-68	
582	The House at Pooh Corner: Piglet Does a Very Grand Thing	A. A. Milne	Alan Bennett	16-Aug-68	
583	The House at Pooh Corner: Eeyore Finds the Wolery	A. A. Milne	Alan Bennett	23-Aug-68	
584	James and the Giant Peach: The Mysterious Peach	Roald Dahl	Bernard Cribbins	30-Sep-68	
585	James and the Giant Peach: Strange Creatures	Roald Dahl	Bernard Cribbins	01-Oct-68	
586	James and the Giant Peach: Danger - Sharks!	Roald Dahl	Bernard Cribbins	02-Oct-68	
587	James and the Giant Peach: Adventures in the Air	Roald Dahl	Bernard Cribbins	03-Oct-68	
588	James and the Giant Peach: Down to Earth	Roald Dahl	Bernard Cribbins	04-Oct-68	
589	Chi Ming: Chi Ming and the Tiger Kitten	Josephine Marquand	Judi Dench	07-Oct-68	
590	Chi Ming: Chi Ming and the Lion Dance	Josephine Marquand	Judi Dench	08-Oct-68	
591	Chi Ming: Chi Ming and the Jade Earring	Josephine Marquand	Judi Dench	09-Oct-68	
592	Chi Ming: Chi Ming Moves House	Josephine Marquand	Judi Dench	10-Oct-68	
593	Chi Ming: Chi Ming and That Dragon Boat Race	Josephine Marquand	Judi Dench	11-Oct-68	
594	The Naughty Little Elves/The Tree Carpet (Note: Viewers' Writing Competition Winners)	Christiane Sorensen (aged 6) & Howard Grossman (aged 6)	Elisabeth Welch & Simon Ward	14-Oct-68	
595	Tiffini's Magic Cabbage Adventure/The Summer's Magic	Anne Hopkins (aged 13) & Freddie Bower (aged 10)	Ray Smith	15-Oct-68	
596	The Cat Who Snored/The Magic Giant	Fiona Ewart (aged 13) & Caroline Reynolds (aged 8)	Dandy Nichols & Ted Ray	16-Oct-68	
597	My Sister Sophie/The Vicious Woman	Katey Thomas (aged 7) & Debbie Cox (aged 10)	Judi Dench & Gilbert Wynne	17-Oct-68	
598	I Really Don't Know/The Quins/The Bathing Boxer Jumped	Naomi Whitelaw (aged 11), Susan Isaac (aged 11) & David Osrin (aged 4)	Rodney Bewes	18-Oct-68	
599	Farmer Boy: Part 1 - Winter	Laura Ingalls Wilder	Richard Monette	21-Oct-68	
600	Farmer Boy: Part 2 - The Horse Buyer	Laura Ingalls Wilder	Richard Monette	22-Oct-68	
601	Farmer Boy: Part 3 - Independence	Laura Ingalls Wilder	Richard Monette	23-Oct-68	
602	Farmer Boy: Part 4 - The County Fair	Laura Ingalls Wilder	Richard Monette	24-Oct-68	
603	Farmer Boy: Part 5 - Starlight	Laura Ingalls Wilder	Richard Monette	25-Oct-68	
604	Witch Stories for Hallowe'en: The Old Witch		Rosemary Leach	28-Oct-68	
605	Witch Stories for Hallowe'en: Zini and the Witches		Rosemary Leach	29-Oct-68	
606	Witch Stories for Hallowe'en: A Tale of Baba Yaga		Rosemary Leach	30-Oct-68	
607	Witch Stories for Hallowe'en: Once in, Never Out Again		Rosemary Leach	31-Oct-68	
608	Witch Stories for Hallowe'en: Rapunzel		Rosemary Leach	01-Nov-68	
609	True Car Stories: The Horseless Carriage		Edward de Souza	04-Nov-68	
610	True Car Stories: Rolls and Royce		Edward de Souza	05-Nov-68	
611	True Car Stories: Mr Motoring		Edward de Souza	06-Nov-68	
612	True Car Stories: Crazy Journey		Edward de Souza	07-Nov-68	
613	True Car Stories: The Faster They Go		Edward de Souza	08-Nov-68	
614	Albert the Dragon and the Centaur: Albert Finds a Curious Creature	Rosemary Weir	Miriam Margolyes	11-Nov-68	
615	Albert the Dragon and the Centaur: The Problem Child	Rosemary Weir	Miriam Margolyes		12-Nov-68
616	Albert the Dragon and the Centaur: A Plan Is Hatched	Rosemary Weir	Miriam Margolyes		13-Nov-68
617	Albert the Dragon and the Centaur: An Eventful Journey	Rosemary Weir	Miriam Margolyes		14-Nov-68
618	Albert the Dragon and the Centaur: Wishes Come True	Rosemary Weir	Miriam Margolyes		15-Nov-68
619	The Witch's Daughter: Part 1 - A Piece of Glass Worth a King's Ransom	Nina Bawden	Gilbert Wynne	18-Nov-68	
620	The Witch's Daughter: Part 2 - Mr Hoggart Has an Accident	Nina Bawden	Gilbert Wynne	19-Nov-68	
621	The Witch's Daughter: Part 3 - The Mysterious Mr Jones	Nina Bawden	Gilbert Wynne	20-Nov-68	
622	The Witch's Daughter: Part 4 - A Kind of Magic	Nina Bawden	Gilbert Wynne	21-Nov-68	
623	The Witch's Daughter: Part 5 - A Bunch of Rare Flowers	Nina Bawden	Gilbert Wynne	22-Nov-68	
624	The Adventures of Bécassine: Bécassine Grows Up	Caumery	Bridget Searle	25-Nov-68	
625	The Adventures of Bécassine: Bécassine Goes to the Mountains	Caumery	Bridget Searle	26-Nov-68	
626	The Adventures of Bécassine: Bécassine's Car	Caumery	Bridget Searle	27-Nov-68	
627	The Adventures of Bécassine: Bécassine Runs a Boarding House	Caumery	Bridget Searle	28-Nov-68	
628	The Adventures of Bécassine: Cowboys and Indians	Caumery	Bridget Searle	29-Nov-68	
629	Stories from Iceland: The Pony		Magnus Magnusson	02-Dec-68	
630	Stories from Iceland: The Prince and His Dog		Magnus Magnusson	03-Dec-68	
631	Stories from Iceland: The Polar Bear		Magnus Magnusson	04-Dec-68	
632	Stories from Iceland: The Thursday Story		Magnus Magnusson	05-Dec-68	
633	Stories from Iceland: Greyman		Magnus Magnusson	06-Dec-68	
634	The Wolves of Willoughby Chase: Part 1 - An Attack by the Wolves	Joan Aiken	June Barry	09-Dec-68	
635	The Wolves of Willoughby Chase: Part 2 - The Wicked Miss Slighcarp	Joan Aiken	June Barry	10-Dec-68	
636	The Wolves of Willoughby Chase: Part 3 - Where Is the Secret Passage?	Joan Aiken	June Barry	11-Dec-68	
637	The Wolves of Willoughby Chase: Part 4 - The Escape from Blastburn	Joan Aiken	June Barry	12-Dec-68	
638	The Wolves of Willoughby Chase: Part 5 - A Four-Hundred-Mile Walk to London	Joan Aiken	June Barry	13-Dec-68	
639	Grimble: Grimble Has Parent Trouble and Ices a Cake	Clement Freud		16-Dec-68	
640	Grimble: Grimble Goes Shopping and Makes a Welsh Rarebit	Clement Freud		17-Dec-68	
641	Grimble: Grimble Worries About Getting Fat But Makes Fudge	Clement Freud		18-Dec-68	
642	Grimble: Grimble Works on Some Party Tricks and Produces a Surprising Onion Soup	Clement Freud		19-Dec-68	
643	Grimble: Grimble Goes to a Restaurant and Makes Lemon Ice Cream	Clement Freud		20-Dec-68	
644	Christmas Stories: Babar and Father Christmas	Jean de Brunhoff	Alan Bennett	23-Dec-68	
645	Christmas Stories: The Little Juggler		Ted Ray	24-Dec-68	
646	Christmas Stories: The Minstrel and the Mountain	Jane Yolen	John Stride	25-Dec-68	
647	Christmas Stories: The Selfish Giant	Oscar Wilde	Ronald Eyre	27-Dec-68	
648	The Land of Green Ginger: Chapter the First	Noel Langley	Kenneth Williams	30-Dec-68	
649	The Land of Green Ginger: Chapter the Second	Noel Langley	Kenneth Williams	31-Dec-68	

== 1969 ==
Episode	Story	Written by	Read by	Original air date
650	The Land of Green Ginger: Chapter the Third	Noel Langley	Kenneth Williams	01-Jan-69
651	The Land of Green Ginger: Chapter the Fourth	Noel Langley	Kenneth Williams	02-Jan-69
652	The Land of Green Ginger: Chapter the Fifth	Noel Langley	Kenneth Williams	03-Jan-69
653	A Pony in the Luggage: Part 1 - The Beginning of the Good Luck	Gunnel Linde	Hannah Gordon	06-Jan-69
654	A Pony in the Luggage: Part 2 - A Four-Legged Worry	Gunnel Linde	Hannah Gordon	07-Jan-69
655	A Pony in the Luggage: Part 3 - Laughter in the Wardrobe	Gunnel Linde	Hannah Gordon	08-Jan-69
656	A Pony in the Luggage: Part 4 - Good Night?	Gunnel Linde	Hannah Gordon	09-Jan-69
657	A Pony in the Luggage: Part 5 - All Is Well	Gunnel Linde	Hannah Gordon	10-Jan-69
658	Sir Gawain and the Green Knight: Part 1 - The Green Knight's Challenge	Traditional British tale	Ray Smith	13-Jan-69
659	Sir Gawain and the Green Knight: Part 2 - Sir Gawain Rides Forth	Traditional British tale	Ray Smith	14-Jan-69
660	Sir Gawain and the Green Knight: Part 3 - A Knight and a Lady	Traditional British tale	Ray Smith	15-Jan-69
661	Sir Gawain and the Green Knight: Part 4 - The Blow Returned	Traditional British tale	Ray Smith	16-Jan-69
662	Where Arthur Sleeps	Traditional British tale	Ray Smith	17-Jan-69
663	Beatrix Potter Stories: The Tale of Peter Rabbit	Beatrix Potter	Joyce Grenfell	20-Jan-69
664	Beatrix Potter Stories: The Tale of Squirrel Nutkin	Beatrix Potter	Joyce Grenfell	21-Jan-69
665	Beatrix Potter Stories: The Tale of Mr Jeremy Fisher	Beatrix Potter	Joyce Grenfell	22-Jan-69
666	Beatrix Potter Stories: The Tale of Jemima Puddle-Duck	Beatrix Potter	Joyce Grenfell	23-Jan-69
667	Beatrix Potter Stories: The Tale of Mrs Tittlemouse	Beatrix Potter	Joyce Grenfell	24-Jan-69
668	The Latchkey Children: Part 1 - A Fight for the Tree	Eric Allen	Keith Barron	27-Jan-69
669	The Latchkey Children: Part 2 - Plotting and Planning	Eric Allen	Keith Barron	28-Jan-69
670	The Latchkey Children: Part 3 - Etty and Billandben Meet a Television Personality	Eric Allen	Keith Barron	29-Jan-69
671	The Latchkey Children: Part 4 - Will Goggle's Idea Work?	Eric Allen	Keith Barron	30-Jan-69
672	The Latchkey Children: Part 5 - Will the Tree Be Saved?	Eric Allen	Keith Barron	31-Jan-69
673	Egyptian Folk Tales: The Bean Merchant's Daughter	Traditional Egyptian Tale	Samira Kirollos	03-Feb-69
674	Egyptian Folk Tales: How Ali Bey Got Rid of the Jinn	Traditional Egyptian Tale	Samira Kirollos	04-Feb-69
675	Egyptian Folk Tales: The Story of the Four Good Magicians	Traditional Egyptian Tale	Samira Kirollos	05-Feb-69
676	Egyptian Folk Tales: The Thief Who Broke His Leg	Traditional Egyptian Tale	Samira Kirollos	06-Feb-69
677	Egyptian Folk Tales: The Monastery of St Pacomus	Traditional Egyptian Tale	Samira Kirollos	07-Feb-69
678	The Adventures of the Little Wooden Horse: The Little Wooden Horse Sets Out to Make His Fortune	Ursula Moray Williams	Gordon Gostelow	10-Feb-69
679	The Adventures of the Little Wooden Horse: The Little Wooden Horse Goes Down a Mine	Ursula Moray Williams	Gordon Gostelow	11-Feb-69
680	The Adventures of the Little Wooden Horse: The Little Wooden Horse Pulls the Royal Coach	Ursula Moray Williams	Gordon Gostelow	12-Feb-69
681	The Adventures of the Little Wooden Horse: The Little Wooden Horse Joins a Circus	Ursula Moray Williams	Gordon Gostelow	13-Feb-69
682	The Adventures of the Little Wooden Horse: The Little Wooden Horse and Pirate Jacky	Ursula Moray Williams	Gordon Gostelow	14-Feb-69
683	The Signposters: An Idea Is Born	Helen Cresswell	Billie Whitelaw	17-Feb-69
684	The Signposters: The Dreadful Visit	Helen Cresswell	Billie Whitelaw	18-Feb-69
685	The Signposters: The Signposters Go to Lamfrey and See the Strolling Players	Helen Cresswell	Billie Whitelaw	19-Feb-69
686	The Signposters: Hetty Finds a Long Lost Relative - and Some Tents!	Helen Cresswell	Billie Whitelaw	20-Feb-69
687	The Signposters: The Great Family Reunion	Helen Cresswell	Billie Whitelaw	21-Feb-69
688	The Extraordinary Adventures of Bobby Brewster: The Sick Cow/An Elephant Never Forgets	H. E. Todd		24-Feb-69
689	The Extraordinary Adventures of Bobby Brewster: The Racing Shadow/The Echo	H. E. Todd		25-Feb-69
690	The Extraordinary Adventures of Bobby Brewster: The Flashing Torch/The Magic Wristwatch	H. E. Todd		26-Feb-69
691	The Extraordinary Adventures of Bobby Brewster: Scrumpistick/The Special Telephone	H. E. Todd		27-Feb-69
692	The Extraordinary Adventures of Bobby Brewster: The Think Balloon/The Fat and Jolly Ghost	H. E. Todd		28-Feb-69
693	Buried Treasure: A Roman Palace Rediscovered		Patricia Connor	31-Mar-69
694	Buried Treasure: Draw Me an Animal, 20,000 Years Ago		Patricia Connor	04-Mar-69
695	Buried Treasure: Is It Really True?		Patricia Connor	05-Mar-69
696	Buried Treasure: They Buried Their Treasure with Them		Patricia Connor	06-Mar-69
697	Buried Treasure: Treasures Under the Sea		Patricia Connor	07-Mar-69
698	The Magic Pudding: The First Slice	Norman Lindsay	Rod McLennan	10-Mar-69
699	The Magic Pudding: The Second Slice	Norman Lindsay	Rod McLennan	11-Mar-69
700	The Magic Pudding: The Third Slice	Norman Lindsay	Rod McLennan	12-Mar-69
701	The Magic Pudding: The Fourth Slice	Norman Lindsay	Rod McLennan	13-Mar-69
702	The Magic Pudding: The Fifth and the Last Slice	Norman Lindsay	Rod McLennan	14-Mar-69
703	Hungarian Stories: The Finch with the Golden Voice		Mia Nardi	17-Mar-69
704	Hungarian Stories: Larkspur and Violet		Mia Nardi	18-Mar-69
705	Hungarian Stories: The Young Man Who Kept His Dream a Secret		Mia Nardi	19-Mar-69
706	Hungarian Stories: Little Berry		Mia Nardi	20-Mar-69
707	Hungarian Stories: God Bless the King		Mia Nardi	21-Mar-69
708	Jack and the Beanstalk	Traditional English tale	Dan Meaden	24-Mar-69
709	The Clever Little Tailor		Dan Meaden	25-Mar-69
710	Giant Alexander		Dan Meaden	26-Mar-69
711	Ulysses and the Cyclops		Dan Meaden	27-Mar-69
712	Jack the Giant-Killer	Traditional English tale	Dan Meaden	28-Mar-69
713	Magic in My Pocket: The Merry-Go-Round	Alison Uttley	Rosemary Leach	31-Mar-69
714	Magic in My Pocket: The Red Hen	Alison Uttley	Rosemary Leach	01-Apr-69
715	Magic in My Pocket: Orion Hardy	Alison Uttley	Rosemary Leach	02-Apr-69
716	Magic in My Pocket: The Keys of the Trees	Alison Uttley	Rosemary Leach	03-Apr-69
717	Magic in My Pocket: The Easter Egg	Alison Uttley	Rosemary Leach	04-Apr-69
718	The Elm Street Lot: Mr Crackenthorpe's Bath	Philippa Pearce	Ray Brooks	07-Apr-69
719	The Elm Street Lot: Hamster at Large	Philippa Pearce	Ray Brooks	08-Apr-69
720	The Elm Street Lot: Rooftop	Philippa Pearce	Ray Brooks	09-Apr-69
721	The Elm Street Lot: Kite Crazy	Philippa Pearce	Ray Brooks	10-Apr-69
722	The Elm Street Lot: Miss Munson and the Festival of Arts, Crafts, Athletics, Pets, Gardens, and Inventions	Philippa Pearce	Ray Brooks	11-Apr-69
723	The Moffats: The Yellow House on New Dollar Street	Eleanor Estes	Elisabeth Welch	14-Apr-69
724	The Moffats: The Ghost in the Attic	Eleanor Estes	Elisabeth Welch	16-Apr-69
725	The Moffats: Sailor's Hornpipe	Eleanor Estes	Elisabeth Welch	17-Apr-69
726	The Moffats: Goodbye to the Yellow House	Eleanor Estes	Elisabeth Welch	18-Apr-69
727	London Stories: Dick Whittington		Joe Melia	21-Apr-69
728	London Stories: The Gunpowder Plot		Joe Melia	22-Apr-69
729	London Stories: The Fire of London		Joe Melia	23-Apr-69
730	London Stories: Colonel Blood and the Crown Jewels		Joe Melia	24-Apr-69
731	London Stories: The Stone of Destiny		Joe Melia	25-Apr-69
732	Jane's Adventures on the Island of Peeg: Part 1 - The First Explosion	Jonathan Gathorne-Hardy	Vivian Pickles	28-Apr-69
733	Jane's Adventures on the Island of Peeg: Part 2 - They Nearly Die of Thirst	Jonathan Gathorne-Hardy	Vivian Pickles	29-Apr-69
734	Jane's Adventures on the Island of Peeg: Part 3 - Outnumbered, Outarmed, But British!	Jonathan Gathorne-Hardy	Vivian Pickles	30-Apr-69
735	Jane's Adventures on the Island of Peeg: Part 4 - Mr Tulip	Jonathan Gathorne-Hardy	Vivian Pickles	01-May-69
736	Jane's Adventures on the Island of Peeg: Part 5 - The Last Explosion	Jonathan Gathorne-Hardy	Vivian Pickles	02-May-69
737	Stories of Mary Plain: In Which We Get to Know the Bears	Gwynedd Rae	Richard Briers	05-May-69
738	Stories of Mary Plain: In Which Mary Goes Visiting	Gwynedd Rae	Richard Briers	06-May-69
739	Stories of Mary Plain: In Which Mary Gives a Party	Gwynedd Rae	Richard Briers	07-May-69
740	Stories of Mary Plain: In Which Mary Goes to England and Sees the Queen	Gwynedd Rae	Richard Briers	08-May-69
741	Stories of Mary Plain: In Which Mary Becomes Famous	Gwynedd Rae	Richard Briers	09-May-69
742	The Hartwarp Light Railway: Trial Run	John Pudney	George Layton	12-May-69
743	The Hartwarp Light Railway: Full Steam Ahead	John Pudney	George Layton	13-May-69
744	The Hartwarp Circus: Winter Quarters	John Pudney	George Layton	14-May-69
745	The Hartwarp Circus: The Fire	John Pudney	George Layton	15-May-69
746	The Hartwarp Circus: The Morning After	John Pudney	George Layton	16-May-69
747	Mortimer Also: Henry Lester Meets Mortimer Also	Jo Rice	Harry Fowler	19-May-69
748	Mortimer Also: Mortimer Discovers Henry's Secret	Jo Rice	Harry Fowler	20-May-69
749	Mortimer Also: The Plan Goes Into Action	Jo Rice	Harry Fowler	21-May-69
750	Mortimer Also: England Wins the Ashes	Jo Rice	Harry Fowler	22-May-69
751	Mortimer Also: The Truth Is Told	Jo Rice	Harry Fowler	23-May-69
752	Stories from Portugal: The Twins with Stars on Their Foreheads	Stories from Portugal	Catharina Ferraz	27-May-69
753	Stories from Portugal: The Ox Prince	Stories from Portugal	Catharina Ferraz	28-May-69
754	Stories from Portugal: Bride of the Sea	Stories from Portugal	Catharina Ferraz	29-May-69
755	Stories from Portugal: The White Kid	Stories from Portugal	Catharina Ferraz	30-May-69
756	No One Must Know: Part 1 - Cumberland Place	Barbara Sleigh	Robert Swann	02-Jun-69
757	No One Must Know: Part 2 - Tom Tiddler's Ground	Barbara Sleigh	Robert Swann	03-Jun-69
758	No One Must Know: Part 3 - The Enemy in the Gates	Barbara Sleigh	Robert Swann	04-Jun-69
759	No One Must Know: Part 4 - The Burglary	Barbara Sleigh	Robert Swann	05-Jun-69
760	No One Must Know: Part 5 - The Chase	Barbara Sleigh	Robert Swann	06-Jun-69
761	Wet Magic: Part 1 - Mermaids Die in Captivity!	E. Nesbit	Margaret Tyzack	09-Jun-69
762	Wet Magic: Part 2 - How Would You Rescue a Mermaid?	E. Nesbit	Margaret Tyzack	10-Jun-69
763	Wet Magic: Part 3 - The Mermaid's Home	E. Nesbit	Margaret Tyzack	11-Jun-69
764	Wet Magic: Part 4 - The Water War	E. Nesbit	Margaret Tyzack	12-Jun-69
765	Wet Magic: Part 5 - Peace at Last	E. Nesbit	Margaret Tyzack	13-Jun-69
766	Gumble's Yard: Left on Our Own	John Rowe Townsend	Colin Welland	07-Jul-69
767	Gumble's Yard: Moonlight Flit	John Rowe Townsend	Colin Welland	08-Jul-69
768	Gumble's Yard: What's in the Crates?	John Rowe Townsend	Colin Welland	09-Jul-69
769	Gumble's Yard: Search for an Uncle	John Rowe Townsend	Colin Welland	10-Jul-69
770	Gumble's Yard: Clash on the Canal Bank	John Rowe Townsend	Colin Welland	11-Jul-69
771	Stories from the Kingdom of Northumbria: The Lambton Worm	Traditional Northumbrian tale	Alex Glasgow	14-Jul-69
772	Stories from the Kingdom of Northumbria: The Cauld Lad of Hylton	Traditional Northumbrian tale	Alex Glasgow	15-Jul-69
773	Stories from the Kingdom of Northumbria: Sir Guy the Seeker	Traditional Northumbrian tale	Alex Glasgow	16-Jul-69
774	Stories from the Kingdom of Northumbria: The Fairies of Stanhope	Traditional Northumbrian tale	Alex Glasgow	17-Jul-69
775	Stories from the Kingdom of Northumbria: The Laidly Worm of Spindleston Heugh	Traditional Northumbrian tale	Alex Glasgow	18-Jul-69
776	Taliesin: The Magic Cauldron	Traditional Welsh tale	Ray Smith	21-Jul-69
777	Taliesin: Taliesin Is Born	Traditional Welsh tale	Ray Smith	22-Jul-69
778	Taliesin: Taliesin Tricks Rhun	Traditional Welsh tale	Ray Smith	23-Jul-69
779	Taliesin: Blerwm, Blerwm!	Traditional Welsh tale	Ray Smith	24-Jul-69
780	Taliesin: A Competition and a Race	Traditional Welsh tale	Ray Smith	25-Jul-69
781	Green Smoke: The Puff of Green Smoke	Rosemary Manning	Ann Beach	28-Jul-69
782	Green Smoke: The Story of the Flaming Dragon	Rosemary Manning	Ann Beach	29-Jul-69
783	Green Smoke: I'm for Tintagel Castle	Rosemary Manning	Ann Beach	30-Jul-69
784	Green Smoke: The Mermaid	Rosemary Manning	Ann Beach	31-Jul-69
785	Green Smoke: The Pool of Excalibur	Rosemary Manning	Ann Beach	01-Aug-69
786	Stories from the Isle of Man: The Buggane of Glen Meay	Traditional Isle of Man Tale	Marian Norris	04-Aug-69
787	Stories from the Isle of Man: The Coming of St Patrick	Traditional Isle of Man Tale	Marian Norris	05-Aug-69
788	Stories from the Isle of Man: The Lazy Wife	Traditional Isle of Man Tale	Marian Norris	06-Aug-69
789	Stories from the Isle of Man: The Lazy Wife	Traditional Isle of Man Tale	Marian Norris	07-Aug-69
790	Stories from the Isle of Man: The Buggane of St Trinian's	Traditional Isle of Man Tale	Marian Norris	08-Aug-69
791	The Founding of Evil Hold School: Lesson 1	Nikolai Tolstoy	Kenneth Williams	08-Sep-69
792	The Founding of Evil Hold School: Lesson 2	Nikolai Tolstoy	Kenneth Williams	09-Sep-69
793	The Founding of Evil Hold School: Lesson 3	Nikolai Tolstoy	Kenneth Williams	10-Sep-69
794	The Founding of Evil Hold School: Lesson 4	Nikolai Tolstoy	Kenneth Williams	11-Sep-69
795	The Founding of Evil Hold School: Lesson 5	Nikolai Tolstoy	Kenneth Williams	12-Sep-69
796	Here Comes Thursday: A Mouse with Far to Go Decides to Stay	Michael Bond	Beryl Cooke	15-Sep-69
797	Here Comes Thursday: Thursday Makes a Friend	Michael Bond	Beryl Cooke	16-Sep-69
798	Here Comes Thursday: Rescue Work	Michael Bond	Beryl Cooke	17-Sep-69
799	Here Comes Thursday: Food for Thought	Michael Bond	Beryl Cooke	18-Sep-69
800	Here Comes Thursday: The Rise and Fall of Harris	Michael Bond	Beryl Cooke	19-Sep-69
801	Dragon Tales: The Prince and the Dragon		George Cole	22-Sep-69
802	Dragon Tales: The Yellow Dragon		George Cole	23-Sep-69
803	Dragon Tales: The Dragon of the Mountain		George Cole	24-Sep-69
804	Dragon Tales: Constantes and the Dragon		George Cole	25-Sep-69
805	Dragon Tales: St George and the Dragon		George Cole	26-Sep-69
806	Stories About Music: Kings, Queens and Choirboys	Susan Hill	Raymond Leppard	29-Sep-69
807	Stories About Music: A Musical Family	Susan Hill	Raymond Leppard	30-Sep-69
808	Stories About Music: Tunes on the Mugs	Susan Hill	Raymond Leppard	01-Oct-69
809	Stories About Music: The Mozarts' Musical Journey	Susan Hill	Raymond Leppard	02-Oct-69
810	Stories About Music: The Drummer	Susan Hill	Raymond Leppard	03-Oct-69
811	Over Sea, Under Stone: Part 1 - The Knights Go Forth	Susan Cooper	David Wood	06-Oct-69
812	Over Sea, Under Stone: Part 2 - The Quest Begins	Susan Cooper	David Wood	07-Oct-69
813	Over Sea, Under Stone: Part 3 - In the Shadow of the Standing Stones	Susan Cooper	David Wood	08-Oct-69
814	Over Sea, Under Stone: Part 4 - Darkness Always Comes	Susan Cooper	David Wood	09-Oct-69
815	Over Sea, Under Stone: Part 5 - The Grail May Not Leave Our Land	Susan Cooper	David Wood	10-Oct-69
816	Littlenose: The Sun Dance	John Grant		13-Oct-69
817	Littlenose: Two Eye's Friends	John Grant		14-Oct-69
818	Littlenose: The Painted Caves	John Grant		15-Oct-69
819	Littlenose: The Giant Snowball	John Grant		16-Oct-69
820	Littlenose: Littlenose Moves House	John Grant		17-Oct-69
821	Norwegian Folk Tales: The Blue Belt	Traditional Norwegian Tale	Sonja Nerdrum	20-Oct-69
822	Norwegian Folk Tales: The Twelve Wild Ducks	Traditional Norwegian Tale	Sonja Nerdrum	21-Oct-69
823	Norwegian Folk Tales: Princess on the Glass Hill	Traditional Norwegian Tale	Sonja Nerdrum	22-Oct-69
824	Norwegian Folk Tales: Farmer Weathersky	Traditional Norwegian Tale	Sonja Nerdrum	23-Oct-69
825	Norwegian Folk Tales: Kari Woodencloak	Traditional Norwegian Tale	Sonja Nerdrum	24-Oct-69
826	The Saturday Man: In Business	Roy Frederick Brown	Joe Melia	27-Oct-69
827	The Saturday Man: Jumble	Roy Frederick Brown	Joe Melia	28-Oct-69
828	The Saturday Man: Joe's Lucky Day	Roy Frederick Brown	Joe Melia	29-Oct-69
829	The Saturday Man: Moving Day	Roy Frederick Brown	Joe Melia	30-Oct-69
830	The Saturday Man: A Bunch of Wild Flowers	Roy Frederick Brown	Joe Melia	31-Oct-69
831	Clown Stories: The Gloves		Larry Parker	03-Nov-69
832	Clown Stories: The Highland Circus		Larry Parker	04-Nov-69
833	Clown Stories: Holland		Larry Parker	05-Nov-69
834	Clown Stories: Paris the Chair		Larry Parker	06-Nov-69
835	Clown Stories: Italy		Larry Parker	07-Nov-69
836	Far Out the Long Canal: Part 1	Meindert DeJong	Michael Bryant	10-Nov-69
837	Far Out the Long Canal: Part 2	Meindert DeJong	Michael Bryant	11-Nov-69
838	Far Out the Long Canal: Part 3	Meindert DeJong	Michael Bryant	12-Nov-69
839	Flight from the Polar Night: Part 1	Meindert DeJong	Michael Bryant	13-Nov-69
840	Flight from the Polar Night: Part 2	Meindert DeJong	Michael Bryant	14-Nov-69
841	The Castle of Yew: Saved by a Sparkler	Lucy M. Boston	Meg Wynn Owen	17-Nov-69
842	The Castle of Yew: Attacked	Lucy M. Boston	Meg Wynn Owen	18-Nov-69
843	Rupert Stories: Rupert and the Dragon Pills	Alfred Bestall	Michael Gaunt	24-Nov-69
844	Rupert Stories: Rupert and the Black Imp	Alfred Bestall	Michael Gaunt	25-Nov-69
845	Rupert Stories: Rupert and the Mare's Nest	Alfred Bestall	Michael Gaunt	26-Nov-69
846	Rupert Stories: Rupert, Beppo, and the Caravan	Alfred Bestall	Michael Gaunt	27-Nov-69
847	Rupert Stories: Rupert and the Distant Music	Alfred Bestall	Michael Gaunt	28-Nov-69
848	Border Stories: Thomas the Rhymer		Wendy Wood	01-Dec-69
849	Border Stories: The Girl Who Washed in the Morning Dew		Wendy Wood	02-Dec-69
850	Border Stories: The Bannock of Tollishill		Wendy Wood	03-Dec-69
851	Border Stories: Ainsel/Tam Lin		Wendy Wood	04-Dec-69
852	Border Stories: Bonnie Grizel		Wendy Wood	05-Dec-69
853	The Queen's Flowerpot: Part 1 - Strawberries Are Quite Early	Alison Farthing	Alex Marshall	08-Dec-69
854	The Queen's Flowerpot: Part 2 - Mirror, Mirror, Magic Mirror	Alison Farthing	Alex Marshall	09-Dec-69
855	The Queen's Flowerpot: Part 3 - That Is My Flowerpot	Alison Farthing	Alex Marshall	10-Dec-69
856	The Amazing Mr Prothero: Part 1 - Mr Prothero Takes Steps	Honor Arundel	Alex Marshall	11-Dec-69
857	The Amazing Mr Prothero: Part 2 - Mr Prothero Fights a Battle	Honor Arundel	Alex Marshall	12-Dec-69
858	The Night-Watchmen: Tramps and Barrows	Helen Cresswell	Joseph O'Conor	15-Dec-69
859	The Night-Watchmen: Do-As-You-Pleasers	Helen Cresswell	Joseph O'Conor	16-Dec-69
860	The Night-Watchmen: Green Eyes	Helen Cresswell	Joseph O'Conor	17-Dec-69
861	The Night-Watchmen: Escape to the Fields	Helen Cresswell	Joseph O'Conor	18-Dec-69
862	The Night-Watchmen: The Night Train	Helen Cresswell	Joseph O'Conor	19-Dec-69
863	The Kitchen Madonna: Part 1 - The Expedition	Rumer Godden	James Kerry	22-Dec-69
864	The Kitchen Madonna: Part 2 - Beautiful, Wonderful Scraps	Rumer Godden	James Kerry	23-Dec-69
865	The Wombles: Bungo and Orinoco	Elisabeth Beresford	Ronald Hines	29-Dec-69
866	The Wombles: The Great Flood	Elisabeth Beresford	Ronald Hines	30-Dec-69
867	The Wombles: The Snow Womble	Elisabeth Beresford	Ronald Hines	31-Dec-69

== 1970 ==
Episode	Story	Written by	Read by	Original air date
868	The Wombles: Bungo's Great Adventure			01-Jan-70
869	The Wombles: The Midsummer Party			02-Jan-70
870	Stories from Australia: The Laughing Dawn		Gordon Gostelow	05-Jan-70
871	Stories from Australia: Yalonga the Duck		Gordon Gostelow	06-Jan-70
872	Stories from Australia: The Bear Who Came to a Sticky End		Gordon Gostelow	07-Jan-70
873	Stories from Australia: Greedy Weedah		Gordon Gostelow	08-Jan-70
874	Stories from Australia: Wilkuda and the Giant		Gordon Gostelow	09-Jan-70
875	The Wizard of Oz: The Journey Begins	L. Frank Baum	Bernard Cribbins	12-Jan-70
876	The Wizard of Oz: The Field of Poppies	L. Frank Baum	Bernard Cribbins	13-Jan-70
877	The Wizard of Oz: The Emerald City	L. Frank Baum	Bernard Cribbins	14-Jan-70
878	The Wizard of Oz: The Winged Monkeys	L. Frank Baum	Bernard Cribbins	15-Jan-70
879	The Wizard of Oz: Wishes Granted	L. Frank Baum	Bernard Cribbins	16-Jan-70
880	The Ghosts: Part 1 - Do You Believe in Ghosts?	Antonia Barber	Donald Pickering	19-Jan-70
881	The Ghosts: Part 2 - The Need for Help Is Great Enough	Antonia Barber	Donald Pickering	20-Jan-70
882	The Ghosts: Part 3 - The Will to Help Is Strong Enough	Antonia Barber	Donald Pickering	21-Jan-70
883	The Ghosts: Part 4 - Fire!	Antonia Barber	Donald Pickering	22-Jan-70
884	The Ghosts: Part 5 - The Wheel Comes Full Circle	Antonia Barber	Donald Pickering	23-Jan-70
885	The Mystery of the Cross-Eyed Man: Part 1 - Even the Best Laid Plans	Paul Berna	Keith Barron	26-Jan-70
886	The Mystery of the Cross-Eyed Man: Part 2 - A Case of Mistaken Identity	Paul Berna	Keith Barron	27-Jan-70
887	The Mystery of the Cross-Eyed Man: Part 3 - The Crash	Paul Berna	Keith Barron	28-Jan-70
888	The Mystery of the Cross-Eyed Man: Part 4 - Are These the Real Missing Boys?	Paul Berna	Keith Barron	29-Jan-70
889	The Mystery of the Cross-Eyed Man: Part 5 - The Mystery Solved	Paul Berna	Keith Barron	30-Jan-70
890	Moominland Midwinter: Part 1 - The Bewitched Bathing-House	Tove Jansson	Alan Bennett	02-Feb-70
891	Moominland Midwinter: Part 2 - The Ancestor	Tove Jansson	Alan Bennett	03-Feb-70
892	Moominland Midwinter: Part 3 - The Ski-Lesson	Tove Jansson	Alan Bennett	04-Feb-70
893	Moominland Midwinter: Part 4 - The Hemulen	Tove Jansson	Alan Bennett	05-Feb-70
894	Moominland Midwinter: Part 5 - It's Spring!	Tove Jansson	Alan Bennett	06-Feb-70
895	Beware of This Animal: The First Attacks	Ursula Moray Williams	Rodney Bewes	09-Feb-70
896	Beware of This Animal: The Choir Joins in Battle	Ursula Moray Williams	Rodney Bewes	10-Feb-70
897	Beware of This Animal: The Scouts Attack	Ursula Moray Williams	Rodney Bewes	11-Feb-70
898	Beware of This Animal: The Police Attack	Ursula Moray Williams	Rodney Bewes	12-Feb-70
899	Beware of This Animal: The Last Fight	Ursula Moray Williams	Rodney Bewes	13-Feb-70
900	Island Stories: Iain and the Blue-Caps		Michael Williams	16-Feb-70
901	Island Stories: St Michaels Mount - The Giant Who Ate Too Much		Michael Williams	17-Feb-70
902	Island Stories: Redbeard and His Pirates		Michael Williams	18-Feb-70
903	Island Stories: Anglesey - Caradoc and the Fairies		Michael Williams	19-Feb-70
904	Island Stories: The Vanishing Island		Michael Williams	20-Feb-70
905	Stories about Railways: The Talyllyn Railway		Geoffrey Wheeler	23-Feb-70
906	Stories about Railways: Faster and Faster		Geoffrey Wheeler	24-Feb-70
907	Stories about Railways: Under the Ground		Geoffrey Wheeler	25-Feb-70
908	Stories about Railways: Isambard Kingdom Brunel		Geoffrey Wheeler	26-Feb-70
909	Stories about Railways: Night Train		Geoffrey Wheeler	27-Feb-70
910	Borka	John Burningham	Paul Jones	02-Mar-70
911	Preep	Milton Shulman	Paul Jones	03-Mar-70
912	Polonius Penguin Comes to Town	Anthony Abrahams	Paul Jones	04-Mar-70
913	Pelican Park	Mary Cockett	Paul Jones	05-Mar-70
914	Little Owl	Reiner Zimnik and Hanne Axmann	Paul Jones	06-Mar-70
915	The Extraordinary Adventures of Bobby Brewster: Up the Wall/Spider	H. E. Todd		09-Mar-70
916	The Extraordinary Adventures of Bobby Brewster: The Walking Pyjamas/The Wobbly Tooth	H. E. Todd		10-Mar-70
917	The Extraordinary Adventures of Bobby Brewster: The Birds' Concert/Cuckoo Clock	H. E. Todd		11-Mar-70
918	The Extraordinary Adventures of Bobby Brewster: Football Boots/Conker	H. E. Todd		12-Mar-70
919	The Extraordinary Adventures of Bobby Brewster: Diesel Engine Tooter/The Lift	H. E. Todd		13-Mar-70
920	Trouble in the Tower	Roy Frederick Brown	Gordon Gostelow	16-Mar-70
921	The 1000th Jackanory Programme (Note: Billed as the 1000th aired episode which included repeats.)	Gillian Harris, Paul Hinder, Alexandra Hankinson	John Stride, Bernard Cribbins, & Gordon Gostelow	17-Mar-70
922	Holiday Task	Jo Rice	Rosemary Leach	18-Mar-70
923	A Tray of Tea	Joan Aiken	Ray Smith	19-Mar-70
924	Jane's Adventures in Search of a Ladyship	Jonathan Gathorne-Hardy	Margaret Tyzack	20-Mar-70
925	Alice's Adventures in Wonderland: Part 1 - Down the Rabbit Hole	Lewis Carroll	Bernard Cribbins	23-Mar-70
926	Alice's Adventures in Wonderland: Part 2 - The Pool of Tears/A Caucus Race and a Long Tale	Lewis Carroll	Bernard Cribbins	24-Mar-70
927	Alice's Adventures in Wonderland: Part 3 - The Rabbit Sends in a Little Bill/Advice from a Caterpillar/Pig and Pepper	Lewis Carroll	Bernard Cribbins	25-Mar-70
928	Alice's Adventures in Wonderland: Part 4 - A Mad Tea Party/The Queen's Croquet Ground	Lewis Carroll	Bernard Cribbins	26-Mar-70
929	Alice's Adventures in Wonderland: Part 5 - Who Stole the Tarts?/Alice's Evidence	Lewis Carroll	Bernard Cribbins	27-Mar-70
930	The Dribblesome Teapots and Other Incredible Stories: The Dribblesome Teapots	Norman Hunter	George Benson	30-Mar-70
931	The Dribblesome Teapots and Other Incredible Stories: The Priceless Present	Norman Hunter	George Benson	31-Mar-70
932	The Dribblesome Teapots and Other Incredible Stories: The King with the Paper Face	Norman Hunter	George Benson	01-Apr-70
933	The Dribblesome Teapots and Other Incredible Stories: The Dragon Who Cheated	Norman Hunter	George Benson	02-Apr-70
934	The Dribblesome Teapots and Other Incredible Stories: The Unsuitable Suits	Norman Hunter	George Benson	03-Apr-70
935	The Village That Slept: Part 1 - Lost on a Mountain	Monique P. de Ladebat	Rosalie Crutchley	06-Apr-70
936	The Village That Slept: Part 2 - No Way Down	Monique P. de Ladebat	Rosalie Crutchley	07-Apr-70
937	The Village That Slept: Part 3 - A Name for the Baby	Monique P. de Ladebat	Rosalie Crutchley	08-Apr-70
938	The Village That Slept: Part 4 - A Winter in the Snow	Monique P. de Ladebat	Rosalie Crutchley	09-Apr-70
939	The Village That Slept: Part 5 - The Rescue	Monique P. de Ladebat	Rosalie Crutchley	10-Apr-70
940	Stories from India: The White Elephant		Indira Brown	13-Apr-70
941	Stories from India: The Friendly Crow		Indira Brown	15-Apr-70
942	Stories from India: The Hare and the Lion/The Lion and the Hare		Indira Brown	16-Apr-70
943	Stories from India: Prince Kusa		Indira Brown	17-Apr-70
944	Educating Edward: Through the Hedge	Noel Streatfeild	Angela Down	20-Apr-70
945	Educating Edward: Getting to Know Him	Noel Streatfeild	Angela Down	21-Apr-70
946	Educating Edward: The Disaster	Noel Streatfeild	Angela Down	22-Apr-70
947	Educating Edward: The Clue	Noel Streatfeild	Angela Down	23-Apr-70
948	Educating Edward: The End of the Trail	Noel Streatfeild	Angela Down	24-Apr-70
949	Ballet Stories: The Sleeping Beauty		David Wood	27-Apr-70
950	Ballet Stories: Coppelia		David Wood	28-Apr-70
951	Ballet Stories: Swan Lake		David Wood	29-Apr-70
952	Ballet Stories: The Nutcracker		David Wood	30-Apr-70
953	Ballet Stories: The Firebird		David Wood	01-May-70
954	The Runaway Summer: Part 1 - The Boy from the Sea	Nina Bawden	Ray Brooks	04-May-70
955	The Runaway Summer: Part 2 - Against the Law	Nina Bawden	Ray Brooks	05-May-70
956	The Runaway Summer: Part 3 - Wild Goose Chase	Nina Bawden	Ray Brooks	06-May-70
957	The Runaway Summer: Part 4 - The Best Place in the World	Nina Bawden	Ray Brooks	07-May-70
958	The Runaway Summer: Part 5 - The Storm and After	Nina Bawden	Ray Brooks	08-May-70
959	The Rebels of Journey's End: The Plight of Rikiki	Diana Frances Bell	Polly Elwes	11-May-70
960	The Rebels of Journey's End: Rufus Makes a Decision	Diana Frances Bell	Polly Elwes	12-May-70
961	The Rebels of Journey's End: Bait for a Spy	Diana Frances Bell	Polly Elwes	13-May-70
962	The Rebels of Journey's End: Oscar in Action	Diana Frances Bell	Polly Elwes	14-May-70
963	The Rebels of Journey's End: The Fate of the Soup	Diana Frances Bell	Polly Elwes	15-May-70
964	The Good Master: Cousin Kate from Budapest	Kate Seredy	Sandor Elès	18-May-70
965	The Good Master: The Riding Lesson	Kate Seredy	Sandor Elès	19-May-70
966	The Good Master: The Round-up	Kate Seredy	Sandor Elès	20-May-70
967	The Good Master: Strange Waters	Kate Seredy	Sandor Elès	21-May-70
968	The Good Master: A Seasonal Visitor	Kate Seredy	Sandor Elès	22-May-70
969	Hullabaloo: The Storyteller	Saki	Ronnie Corbett	25-May-70
970	Hullabaloo: The Grand Feast	Catherine Sinclair	Ronnie Corbett	26-May-70
971	Hullabaloo: An Inspector Calls	Anthony Buckeridge	Ronnie Corbett	27-May-70
972	Hullabaloo: Isabella and the Green Silk Frock		Ronnie Corbett	28-May-70
973	Hullabaloo: The Waterworks	E. Nesbit	Ronnie Corbett	29-May-70
974	Sitting Bull: Part 1 - A Boy Called 'Slow'		Don McKay	01-Jun-70
975	Sitting Bull: Part 2 - The Winter When 'Jumping Bull' Was Brought Home		Don McKay	02-Jun-70
976	Sitting Bull: Part 3 - The White Man's Road		Don McKay	03-Jun-70
977	Sitting Bull: Part 4 - A Band of Gold 30 Miles Wide		Don McKay	04-Jun-70
978	Sitting Bull: Part 5 - The Battle of the Little Big Horn		Don McKay	05-Jun-70
979	One's Pool: Part 1	Ray Pope	Prunella Scales	08-Jun-70
980	One's Pool: Part 2	Ray Pope	Prunella Scales	09-Jun-70
981	One's Pool: Part 3	Ray Pope	Prunella Scales	10-Jun-70
982	Penny Pony: Part 1	Barbara Willard	Prunella Scales	11-Jun-70
983	Penny Pony: Part 2	Barbara Willard	Prunella Scales	12-Jun-70
984	Songberd's Grove: Part 1 - Message from No 1	Anne Barrett	John Slater	13-Jul-70
985	Songberd's Grove: Part 2 - The Meeting with Lennie	Anne Barrett	John Slater	14-Jul-70
986	Songberd's Grove: Part 3 - The Carved Stone	Anne Barrett	John Slater	15-Jul-70
987	Songberd's Grove: Part 4 - Bollard and Pimm Make a Discovery	Anne Barrett	John Slater	16-Jul-70
988	Songberd's Grove: Part 5 - Success for the Singers	Anne Barrett	John Slater	17-Jul-70
989	Humbert, Mr Firkin, and the Lord Mayor of London/The Golden Horse	John Burningham/Silvia Hartmann	James Beck	07-Sep-70
990	My Dog Sunday	Leila Berg	Jim Dale	08-Sep-70
991	Mrs Cockle's Cat	Philippa Pearce	Ann Morrish	09-Sep-70
992	Achilles the Donkey	H. E. Bates	Gary Hope	10-Sep-70
993	Greyling	Jane Yolen	Lawrence James	11-Sep-70
994	Operation Smuggle: Part 1 - Two Thousand Ladies and Three Thousand Gents	Dorothy Clewes	Ray Lonnen	14-Sep-70
995	Operation Smuggle: Part 2 - The Secret of the Smugglers' Inne	Dorothy Clewes	Ray Lonnen	15-Sep-70
996	Operation Smuggle: Part 3 - The Man in the Crooked Hat	Dorothy Clewes	Ray Lonnen	16-Sep-70
997	Operation Smuggle: Part 4 - Red Randall's Tunnel	Dorothy Clewes	Ray Lonnen	17-Sep-70
998	Operation Smuggle: Part 5	Dorothy Clewes	Ray Lonnen	18-Sep-70
999	The Wind in the Willows: Part 1 - The River Bank	Kenneth Grahame	Rodney Bewes	21-Sep-70
1000	The Wind in the Willows: Part 2 - The Open Road	Kenneth Grahame	Rodney Bewes	22-Sep-70
1001	The Wind in the Willows: Part 3 - Mr Toad	Kenneth Grahame	Rodney Bewes	23-Sep-70
1002	The Wind in the Willows: Part 4 - The Unlikely Washerwoman	Kenneth Grahame	Rodney Bewes	24-Sep-70
1003	The Wind in the Willows: Part 5 - The Battle for Toad Hall	Kenneth Grahame	Rodney Bewes	25-Sep-70
1004	The Railway Stories: The Three Railway Engines	Rev. Wilbert Awdry	Ted Ray	28-Sep-70
1005	The Railway Stories: Thomas the Tank Engine	Rev. Wilbert Awdry	Ted Ray	29-Sep-70
1006	The Railway Stories: Duck and the Diesel Engine	Rev. Wilbert Awdry	Ted Ray	30-Sep-70
1007	The Railway Stories: Toby the Tram Engine	Rev. Wilbert Awdry	Ted Ray	01-Oct-70
1008	The Railway Stories: The Eight Famous Engines	Rev. Wilbert Awdry	Ted Ray	02-Oct-70
1009	Russian Folk Tales: The Palace of the Singing-Tree	Traditional Russian Tale	John Stride	05-Oct-70
1010	Russian Folk Tales: The Princess Who Couldn't Smile	Traditional Russian Tale	John Stride	06-Oct-70
1011	Russian Folk Tales: The Midnight Dance	Traditional Russian Tale	John Stride	07-Oct-70
1012	Russian Folk Tales: Larissa and the Magic Doll	Traditional Russian Tale	John Stride	08-Oct-70
1013	Russian Folk Tales: Ivan's War-Horse	Traditional Russian Tale	John Stride	09-Oct-70
1014	The Wilkses: Part 1 - A Plan and a Disappointment	Helen Cresswell	Jo Rowbottom	12-Oct-70
1015	The Wilkses: Part 2 - Alice, Witch of Northumbria	Helen Cresswell	Jo Rowbottom	13-Oct-70
1016	The Wilkses: Part 3 - Oliver	Helen Cresswell	Jo Rowbottom	14-Oct-70
1017	The Wilkses: Part 4 - An Outing to 1970	Helen Cresswell	Jo Rowbottom	15-Oct-70
1018	The Wilkses: Part 5 - Discovery and Escape	Helen Cresswell	Jo Rowbottom	16-Oct-70
1019	Preep and the Queen	Milton Shulman	Gary Watson	19-Oct-70
1020	Prince Bertram the Bad/Giant John	Arnold Lobel	Gary Watson	20-Oct-70
1021	The Legend of the Willow Pattern Plate		Gary Watson	21-Oct-70
1022	The Emperor's Oblong Pancake		Gary Watson	22-Oct-70
1023	The Little Prince and the Tiger Cat/The Emperor's Rhyme		Gary Watson	23-Oct-70
1024	The Hag Calls for Help: Part 1 - Sootylegs Leaves Home	Lorna Wood	Margaret Tyzack	26-Oct-70
1025	The Hag Calls for Help: Part 2 - The Disappearance of Uncle Harold	Lorna Wood	Margaret Tyzack	27-Oct-70
1026	The Hag Calls for Help: Part 3 - Rascallito the Gangster Rook	Lorna Wood	Margaret Tyzack	28-Oct-70
1027	The Hag Calls for Help: Part 4 - The Slave of the Ring	Lorna Wood	Margaret Tyzack	29-Oct-70
1028	The Hag Calls for Help: Part 5 - A Traveller Returns	Lorna Wood	Margaret Tyzack	30-Oct-70
1029	Chance and the Fire-Horses: Part 1 - Chance Arrival	Ernest Dudley	Joe Melia	02-Nov-70
1030	Chance and the Fire-Horses: Part 2 - Bruce, the Bus-Horse	Ernest Dudley	Joe Melia	03-Nov-70
1031	Chance and the Fire-Horses: Part 3 - The Fire-Show	Ernest Dudley	Joe Melia	04-Nov-70
1032	Chance and the Fire-Horses: Part 4 - Fireworks	Ernest Dudley	Joe Melia	05-Nov-70
1033	Chance and the Fire-Horses: Part 5 - More Fireworks	Ernest Dudley	Joe Melia	06-Nov-70
1034	The Quest for Olwen: King Arthur's Cousin	Traditional Celtic Tale	Ray Smith	09-Nov-70
1035	The Quest for Olwen: Giant Ysbaddaden	Traditional Celtic Tale	Ray Smith	10-Nov-70
1036	The Quest for Olwen: The Magic Sword	Traditional Celtic Tale	Ray Smith	11-Nov-70
1037	The Quest for Olwen: The Beard of Great Dillus	Traditional Celtic Tale	Ray Smith	12-Nov-70
1038	The Quest for Olwen: The Blood of the Black Witch	Traditional Celtic Tale	Ray Smith	13-Nov-70
1039	Mrs Pepperpot: 1 - Little Old Mrs Pepperpot/Mrs Pepperpot Finds Hidden Treasure	Alf Prøysen	Patsy Rowlands	16-Nov-70
1040	Mrs Pepperpot: 2 - Mrs Pepperpot Buys Macaroni/Mrs Pepperpot Tries to Please Her Husband	Alf Prøysen	Patsy Rowlands	17-Nov-70
1041	Mrs Pepperpot: 3 - The Ski Race	Alf Prøysen	Patsy Rowlands	18-Nov-70
1042	Mrs Pepperpot: 4 - Mrs Pepperpot Minds the Baby/Mrs Pepperpot's Penny Watchman	Alf Prøysen	Patsy Rowlands	19-Nov-70
1043	Mrs Pepperpot: 5 - Mrs Pepperpot to the Rescue	Alf Prøysen	Patsy Rowlands	20-Nov-70
1044	The Haunted Mine: Part 1 - The Mine	Richard Potts	Michael Bryant	23-Nov-70
1045	The Haunted Mine: Part 2 - Parcel from Australia	Richard Potts	Michael Bryant	24-Nov-70
1046	The Haunted Mine: Part 3 - Back to the Mine	Richard Potts	Michael Bryant	25-Nov-70
1047	The Haunted Mine: Part 4 - Down the Rope	Richard Potts	Michael Bryant	26-Nov-70
1048	The Haunted Mine: Part 5 - Lost Found	Richard Potts	Michael Bryant	27-Nov-70
1049	The Overland Launch: Part 1 - Disaster	C. Walter Hodges	Freddie Jones	30-Nov-70
1050	The Overland Launch: Part 2 - Impossible	C. Walter Hodges	Freddie Jones	01-Dec-70
1051	The Overland Launch: Part 3 - Ashton Lane	C. Walter Hodges	Freddie Jones	02-Dec-70
1052	The Overland Launch: Part 4 - Porlock Hill	C. Walter Hodges	Freddie Jones	03-Dec-70
1053	The Overland Launch: Part 5 - The Last Mile	C. Walter Hodges	Freddie Jones	04-Dec-70
1054	Alice Through the Looking-Glass: Looking-Glass House	Lewis Carroll	Bernard Cribbins	07-Dec-70
1055	Alice Through the Looking-Glass: Tweedledum and Tweedledee	Lewis Carroll	Bernard Cribbins	08-Dec-70
1056	Alice Through the Looking-Glass: Humpty Dumpty	Lewis Carroll	Bernard Cribbins	09-Dec-70
1057	Alice Through the Looking-Glass: The Lion and the Unicorn	Lewis Carroll	Bernard Cribbins	10-Dec-70
1058	Alice Through the Looking-Glass: Queen Alice	Lewis Carroll	Bernard Cribbins	11-Dec-70
1059	Castaway Christmas: Part 1 - Floods Ahead	Margaret J. Baker	Michael Craig	14-Dec-70
1060	Castaway Christmas: Part 2 - Oliver to the Rescue	Margaret J. Baker	Michael Craig	15-Dec-70
1061	Castaway Christmas: Part 3 - The First Victory	Margaret J. Baker	Michael Craig	16-Dec-70
1062	Castaway Christmas: Part 4 - The Christmas Candle	Margaret J. Baker	Michael Craig	17-Dec-70
1063	Castaway Christmas: Part 5 - A Message Is Delivered	Margaret J. Baker	Michael Craig	18-Dec-70
1064	Paddington's Christmas	Michael Bond	John Bird	24-Dec-70
1065	Winnie-the-Pooh: Pooh Goes Visiting	A. A. Milne	Alan Bennett	28-Dec-70
1066	Winnie-the-Pooh: Eeyore Loses a Tail	A. A. Milne	Alan Bennett	29-Dec-70
1067	The Pooh Story Book: Piglet Is Entirely Surrounded by Water	A. A. Milne	Alan Bennett	30-Dec-70
1068	The Pooh Story Book: A House Is Built at Pooh Corner	A. A. Milne	Alan Bennett	31-Dec-70

== 1971 ==
Episode	Story	Written by	Read by	Original air date
1069	The Pooh Story Book: Pooh Invents a New Game	01-Jan-71		
1070	Ginger Over the Wall: Part 1 - Lost - and Found?	Prudence Andrew	Harry Fowler	04-Jan-71
1071	Ginger Over the Wall: Part 2 - Help Me!	Prudence Andrew	Harry Fowler	05-Jan-71
1072	Ginger Over the Wall: Part 3 - Carlo's Story	Prudence Andrew	Harry Fowler	06-Jan-71
1073	Ginger Over the Wall: Part 4 - The Police Ask Questions	Prudence Andrew	Harry Fowler	07-Jan-71
1074	Ginger Over the Wall: Part 5 - The Cave Collapses	Prudence Andrew	Harry Fowler	08-Jan-71
1075	Princes and Princesses: East of the Sun and West of the Moon	Traditional Norwegian Tale	Jennie Linden	11-Jan-71
1076	Princes and Princesses: Smoke from Cromwell's Time	Joan Aiken	Jennie Linden	12-Jan-71
1077	Princes and Princesses: The Prince and the Witch's Daughter		Jennie Linden	13-Jan-71
1078	Princes and Princesses: The Princess Splendour	Helen Waddell	Jennie Linden	14-Jan-71
1079	Princes and Princesses: The King's Daughter Cries for the Moon	Eleanor Farjeon	Jennie Linden	15-Jan-71
1080	The Tale of the Red Dragon: The Journey Begins	Alfred Bradley	Octagon Theatre Company	18-Jan-71
1081	The Tale of the Red Dragon: The Blue River	Alfred Bradley	Octagon Theatre Company	19-Jan-71
1082	The Tale of the Red Dragon: Miko Opens the Box	Alfred Bradley	Octagon Theatre Company	20-Jan-71
1083	The Tale of the Red Dragon: Captured	Alfred Bradley	Octagon Theatre Company	21-Jan-71
1084	The Tale of the Red Dragon: Journey's End	Alfred Bradley	Octagon Theatre Company	22-Jan-71
1085	Uncle and His Detective: Part 1 - The Mystery of the Art Gallery	J. P. Martin	Spike Milligan	25-Jan-71
1086	Uncle and His Detective: Part 2 - The Arrival of AB Fox	J. P. Martin	Spike Milligan	26-Jan-71
1087	Uncle and His Detective: Part 3 - Bats from Badfort	J. P. Martin	Spike Milligan	27-Jan-71
1088	Uncle and His Detective: Part 4 - Blogging and Detecting	J. P. Martin	Spike Milligan	28-Jan-71
1089	Uncle and His Detective: Part 5 - Discovery at Crack House	J. P. Martin	Spike Milligan	29-Jan-71
1090	Greek Legends: The War with the Titans	Ancient Greek mythology	Roy Dotrice	01-Feb-71
1091	Greek Legends: The Dark King of the Underworld	Ancient Greek mythology	Roy Dotrice	02-Feb-71
1092	Greek Legends: Perseus and the Gorgon's Head	Ancient Greek mythology	Roy Dotrice	03-Feb-71
1093	Greek Legends: The Golden Touch	Ancient Greek mythology	Roy Dotrice	04-Feb-71
1094	Greek Legends: Jason and the Golden Fleece	Ancient Greek mythology	Roy Dotrice	05-Feb-71
1095	Haki the Shetland Pony: The Colt Is Born	Kathleen Fidler	John Cairney	08-Feb-71
1096	Haki the Shetland Pony: The Pony Show	Kathleen Fidler	John Cairney	09-Feb-71
1097	Haki the Shetland Pony: Adam Leaves Shetland	Kathleen Fidler	John Cairney	10-Feb-71
1098	Haki the Shetland Pony: First Performance	Kathleen Fidler	John Cairney	11-Feb-71
1099	Haki the Shetland Pony: Fire! Fire!	Kathleen Fidler	John Cairney	12-Feb-71
1100	Land of Fire		John Earle	15-Feb-71
1101	Conquest of the Blue Nile	John Blashford-Snell		16-Feb-71
1102	Goddess, Mother of the Snow		John Earle	17-Feb-71
1103	Across the Top of the World	Wally Herbert		18-Feb-71
1104	Hovercraft Down the Amazon	Douglas Botting		19-Feb-71
1105	Littlenose the Musician	John Grant		22-Feb-71
1106	Littlenose and the Beavers	John Grant		23-Feb-71
1107	Littlenose and the Ice Monsters	John Grant		24-Feb-71
1108	Littlenose the Hero	John Grant		25-Feb-71
1109	Littlenose's Voyage	John Grant		26-Feb-71
1110	The Secret Passage: Part 1 - The House Next Door	Nina Bawden	Ray Brooks	01-Mar-71
1111	The Secret Passage: Part 2 - Discoveries	Nina Bawden	Ray Brooks	02-Mar-71
1112	The Secret Passage: Part 3 - Victoria	Nina Bawden	Ray Brooks	03-Mar-71
1113	The Secret Passage: Part 4 - Ben's Plan	Nina Bawden	Ray Brooks	04-Mar-71
1114	The Secret Passage: Part 5 - Miss Pin's Treasure	Nina Bawden	Ray Brooks	05-Mar-71
1115	Turkish Stories: The Miller and the Smiling Cat - Part 1	Traditional Turkish Tale	Brian Blessed	08-Mar-71
1116	Turkish Stories: The Miller and the Smiling Cat - Part 2	Traditional Turkish Tale	Brian Blessed	09-Mar-71
1117	Turkish Stories: The Imp and the Nagging Wife	Traditional Turkish Tale	Brian Blessed	10-Mar-71
1118	Turkish Stories: The Crow-Fairy - Part 1	Traditional Turkish Tale	Brian Blessed	11-Mar-71
1119	Turkish Stories: The Crow-Fairy - Part 2	Traditional Turkish Tale	Brian Blessed	12-Mar-71
1120	The Princess and the Goblin: Part 1 - Curdie	George MacDonald	John Laurie	15-Mar-71
1121	The Princess and the Goblin: Part 2 - The Goblin Palace	George MacDonald	John Laurie	16-Mar-71
1122	The Princess and the Goblin: Part 3 - Woven Then Spun	George MacDonald	John Laurie	17-Mar-71
1123	The Princess and the Goblin: Part 4 - The Escape	George MacDonald	John Laurie	18-Mar-71
1124	The Princess and the Goblin: Part 5 - Subterranean Waters	George MacDonald	John Laurie	19-Mar-71
1125	The Wandering Wombles: Part 1 - The Enormous Lorry	Elisabeth Beresford	Ronald Hines	22-Mar-71
1126	The Wandering Wombles: Part 2 - Fresh Fields and Pastures New	Elisabeth Beresford	Ronald Hines	23-Mar-71
1127	The Wandering Wombles: Part 3 - Great Uncle Bulgaria's Great Idea	Elisabeth Beresford	Ronald Hines	24-Mar-71
1128	The Wandering Wombles: Part 4 - The Monster in the Lock	Elisabeth Beresford	Ronald Hines	25-Mar-71
1129	The Wandering Wombles: Part 5 - The New Burrow	Elisabeth Beresford	Ronald Hines	26-Mar-71
1130	Stories from the Isles of Scilly: The Lost Land	Traditional Scilly Isles Tale	Brian Peck	29-Mar-71
1131	Stories from the Isles of Scilly: The Ghost of Piper's Hole	Traditional Scilly Isles Tale	Brian Peck	31-Mar-71
1132	Stories from the Isles of Scilly: The Emerald Ring	Traditional Scilly Isles Tale	Brian Peck	01-Apr-71
1133	Stories from the Isles of Scilly: The Building of Bishop Rock Lighthouse	Traditional Scilly Isles Tale	Brian Peck	02-Apr-71
1134	The Small Adventures of Dog: Part 1 - The Great Escape	David Buck		05-Apr-71
1135	The Small Adventures of Dog: Part 2 - The Revolt of the Sausages	David Buck		06-Apr-71
1136	The Small Adventures of Dog: Part 3 - A Day at the Zoo	David Buck		07-Apr-71
1137	Egg Bert	David Buck		08-Apr-71
1138	Tim and Charlotte	Edward Ardizzone	Ronald Eyre	13-Apr-71
1139	Paul the Hero of the Fire	Edward Ardizzone	Ronald Eyre	14-Apr-71
1140	Johnny's Bad Day/Diana and Her Rhinoceros	Edward Ardizzone	Ronald Eyre	15-Apr-71
1141	Johnny the Clockmaker	Edward Ardizzone	Ronald Eyre	16-Apr-71
1142	African Legends: A Game of Strength	Traditional African Tale	Charles Hyatt	19-Apr-71
1143	African Legends: Lenki and the Well	Traditional African Tale	Charles Hyatt	20-Apr-71
1144	African Legends: The Magic Pot	Traditional African Tale	Charles Hyatt	21-Apr-71
1145	African Legends: A Goblin to the Rescue	Traditional African Tale	Charles Hyatt	22-Apr-71
1146	African Legends: Samba and the Crocodile	Traditional African Tale	Charles Hyatt	23-Apr-71
1147	The Children Who Stayed Behind: The Thundery Joke	Richard Hough	Ann Morrish	26-Apr-71
1148	The Children Who Stayed Behind: The Kidnapping	Richard Hough	Ann Morrish	27-Apr-71
1149	The Children Who Stayed Behind: The Armoured Car	Richard Hough	Ann Morrish	28-Apr-71
1150	The Children Who Stayed Behind: United Forces	Richard Hough	Ann Morrish	29-Apr-71
1151	The Children Who Stayed Behind: Rob Roy	Richard Hough	Ann Morrish	30-Apr-71
1152	Emil in the Soup Tureen: Emil in the Soup Tureen	Astrid Lindgren	Rosemary Leach	03-May-71
1153	Emil in the Soup Tureen: Emil Hoists Little Ida Up the Flagpole	Astrid Lindgren	Rosemary Leach	04-May-71
1154	Emil in the Soup Tureen: Emil Goes to the Fair on Hultsfred Plain	Astrid Lindgren	Rosemary Leach	05-May-71
1155	Pippi Longstocking: Pippi Plays Tag with a Policeman	Astrid Lindgren	Rosemary Leach	06-May-71
1156	Pippi Longstocking: Pippi Goes to the Circus	Astrid Lindgren	Rosemary Leach	07-May-71
1157	Richard the Lion-Heart: The Battle for Aquitaine	Historical story	Alfred Lynch	10-May-71
1158	Richard the Lion-Heart: King Henry's Heir	Historical story	Alfred Lynch	11-May-71
1159	Richard the Lion-Heart: Richard Is Crowned	Historical story	Alfred Lynch	12-May-71
1160	Richard the Lion-Heart: The Fall of Acre	Historical story	Alfred Lynch	13-May-71
1161	Richard the Lion-Heart: The Prisoner	Historical story	Alfred Lynch	14-May-71
1162	Arabel's Raven: Mortimer Arrives	Joan Aiken	Roy Kinnear	17-May-71
1163	Arabel's Raven: Mortimer Is No 1 Suspect	Joan Aiken	Roy Kinnear	18-May-71
1164	Arabel's Raven: Mr Gumbrell's Escatailors	Joan Aiken	Roy Kinnear	19-May-71
1165	Arabel's Raven: Ghosties	Joan Aiken	Roy Kinnear	20-May-71
1166	Arabel's Raven: Mortimer Becomes a Hero	Joan Aiken	Roy Kinnear	21-May-71
1167	The Laughing Dragon/The Quangle Wangle's Hat	Kenneth Mahood/Edward Lear	Geraldine McEwan	24-May-71
1168	The Beginning of the Armadillos	Rudyard Kipling	Freddie Jones	25-May-71
1169	The Bear's Winter House/The Bear's Water Picnic	John Yeokman/Quentin Blake	Ted Ray	26-May-71
1170	The Griffin and the Minor Canon	Frank R. Stockton	John Stride	27-May-71
1171	Two Cats in America/Mog, The Forgetful Cat	Mischa Damjan/Judith Kerr	George Cole	28-May-71
1172	The Town That Went South: Part 1 - Water Everywhere	Clive King	George Benson	01-Jun-71
1173	The Town That Went South: Part 2 - Café au Lait	Clive King	George Benson	02-Jun-71
1174	The Town That Went South: Part 3	Clive King	George Benson	03-Jun-71
1175	The Town That Went South: Part 4 - The South Pole	Clive King	George Benson	04-Jun-71
1176	Antelope Singer: Part 1 - The Nummer Boy	Ruth Underhill	Blain Fairman	07-Jun-71
1177	Antelope Singer: Part 2 - Indians!	Ruth Underhill	Blain Fairman	08-Jun-71
1178	Antelope Singer: Part 3 - Home	Ruth Underhill	Blain Fairman	09-Jun-71
1179	Antelope Singer: Part 4 - Bad Luck	Ruth Underhill	Blain Fairman	10-Jun-71
1180	Antelope Singer: Part 5 - Partings	Ruth Underhill	Blain Fairman	11-Jun-71
1181	Lost in London: Part 1 - Moving Day	John Prowse	Lawrence James	14-Jun-71
1182	Lost in London: Part 2 - The Junkmen	John Prowse	Lawrence James	15-Jun-71
1183	Lost in London: Part 3 - Market Day	John Prowse	Lawrence James	16-Jun-71
1184	Lost in London: Part 4 - The Highest Bidder	John Prowse	Lawrence James	17-Jun-71
1185	Fattypuffs and Thinifers: Part 1 - A Country Under the Earth	André Maurois	Richard Wattis	05-Jul-71
1186	Fattypuffs and Thinifers: Part 2 - Different Directions	André Maurois	Richard Wattis	06-Jul-71
1187	Fattypuffs and Thinifers: Part 3 - Food v Fitness	André Maurois	Richard Wattis	07-Jul-71
1188	Fattypuffs and Thinifers: Part 4 - War!	André Maurois	Richard Wattis	08-Jul-71
1189	Fattypuffs and Thinifers: Part 5 - Peace and Return	André Maurois	Richard Wattis	09-Jul-71
1190	My Friend Mr Leakey: A Meal with a Magician	J. B. S. Haldane	Milo O'Shea	05-Sep-71
1191	My Friend Mr Leakey: A Morning with a Magician	J. B. S. Haldane	Milo O'Shea	07-Sep-71
1192	My Friend Mr Leakey: A Journey to India	J. B. S. Haldane	Milo O'Shea	08-Sep-71
1193	My Friend Mr Leakey: No Ordinary Flight	J. B. S. Haldane	Milo O'Shea	09-Sep-71
1194	My Friend Mr Leakey: Mr Leakey's Party	J. B. S. Haldane	Milo O'Shea	10-Sep-71
1195	The Sea Islanders: Part 1 - The Far North Bus	Joyce West	Bernard Horsfall	13-Sep-71
1196	The Sea Islanders: Part 2 - Penguin Island	Joyce West	Bernard Horsfall	14-Sep-71
1197	The Sea Islanders: Part 3 - On the Beach	Joyce West	Bernard Horsfall	15-Sep-71
1198	The Sea Islanders: Part 4 - Friday's Decision	Joyce West	Bernard Horsfall	16-Sep-71
1199	The Sea Islanders: Part 5 - The Whole Truth	Joyce West	Bernard Horsfall	17-Sep-71
1200	Brer Rabbit Stories: Brer Fox Goes Hunting But Brer Rabbit Bags the Game	Traditional African tale	Earl Cameron	20-Sep-71
1201	Brer Rabbit Stories: Brer Rabbit and the New House	Traditional African tale	Earl Cameron	21-Sep-71
1202	Brer Rabbit Stories: Can Brer Rabbit Beat Brer Terrapin	Traditional African tale	Earl Cameron	22-Sep-71
1203	Brer Rabbit Stories: Brer Rabbit Tricks Brer Bear	Traditional African tale	Earl Cameron	23-Sep-71
1204	Brer Rabbit Stories: Brer Fox and the Little Rabbits	Traditional African tale	Earl Cameron	24-Sep-71
1205	Italian Stories: Peruonto	Giambattista Basile	Rosalie Crutchley	27-Sep-71
1206	Italian Stories: The Three Animal Princes	Giambattista Basile	Rosalie Crutchley	28-Sep-71
1207	Italian Stories: The Serpent	Giambattista Basile	Rosalie Crutchley	29-Sep-71
1208	Italian Stories: The Seven Doves	Giambattista Basile	Rosalie Crutchley	30-Sep-71
1209	Italian Stories: The Magic Hind	Giambattista Basile	Rosalie Crutchley	01-Oct-71
1210	Grimble: A Spy for Food and a Bread and Butter Pudding	Clement Freud		04-Oct-71
1211	Grimble: France and Frogs' Legs and Lemon Pancakes	Clement Freud		05-Oct-71
1212	Grimble: A Discovery in Düsseldorf and a German Sweet	Clement Freud		06-Oct-71
1213	Grimble: Mystery in Milan and Spaghetti	Clement Freud		07-Oct-71
1214	Grimble: Baketh Beanth in Barthelona and a Spanish Omelette	Clement Freud		08-Oct-71
1215	The Escape of Charles II: The Royal Oak		Maurice Roëves	11-Oct-71
1216	The Escape of Charles II: The Adventures of Will Jones		Maurice Roëves	12-Oct-71
1217	The Escape of Charles II: Will Jackson Finds a Ship		Maurice Roëves	13-Oct-71
1218	The Escape of Charles II: The Three Colonels		Maurice Roëves	14-Oct-71
1219	The Escape of Charles II: Escape and Return		Maurice Roëves	15-Oct-71
1220	Stories from Yorkshire: The Book of Fate		Keith Barron	18-Oct-71
1221	Stories from Yorkshire: Jervaulx Abbey		Keith Barron	19-Oct-71
1222	Stories from Yorkshire: The Brontës		Keith Barron	20-Oct-71
1223	Stories from Yorkshire: The Enchanted Cave		Keith Barron	21-Oct-71
1224	Stories from Yorkshire: A Night on the Moors		Keith Barron	22-Oct-71
1225	The Cuckoo Clock: Part 1 - The Old House	Mary Louisa Molesworth	Ann Morrish	25-Oct-71
1226	The Cuckoo Clock: Part 2 - The Country of the Nodding Mandarins	Mary Louisa Molesworth	Ann Morrish	26-Oct-71
1227	The Cuckoo Clock: Part 3 - Butterfly Lane	Mary Louisa Molesworth	Ann Morrish	27-Oct-71
1228	The Cuckoo Clock: Part 4 - Master Phil	Mary Louisa Molesworth	Ann Morrish	28-Oct-71
1229	The Cuckoo Clock: Part 5 - The Other Side of the Moon	Mary Louisa Molesworth	Ann Morrish	29-Oct-71
1230	The Furious Flycycle: A Visitor Comes to Town	Jan Wahl	Bob Sherman	01-Nov-71
1231	The Furious Flycycle: The Secret of the Grey Pellets	Jan Wahl	Bob Sherman	02-Nov-71
1232	The Furious Flycycle: The Search	Jan Wahl	Bob Sherman	03-Nov-71
1233	The Furious Flycycle: The Return	Jan Wahl	Bob Sherman	04-Nov-71
1234	Flat Stanley	Jeff Brown	Bob Sherman	05-Nov-71
1235	When Marnie Was There: Part 1 - The Old House	Joan G. Robinson	Ann Bell	08-Nov-71
1236	When Marnie Was There: Part 2 - A Girl and a Boat	Joan G. Robinson	Ann Bell	09-Nov-71
1237	When Marnie Was There: Part 3 - Look Out for Me Again	Joan G. Robinson	Ann Bell	10-Nov-71
1238	When Marnie Was There: Part 4 - The Windmill	Joan G. Robinson	Ann Bell	11-Nov-71
1239	When Marnie Was There: Part 5 - The Book	Joan G. Robinson	Ann Bell	12-Nov-71
1240	Scottish Stories: Lod and the Giants	Traditional Scottish tale	Wendy Wood	15-Nov-71
1241	Scottish Stories: The Ghost Dog	Traditional Scottish tale	Wendy Wood	16-Nov-71
1242	Scottish Stories: The Adventures of Iain	Traditional Scottish tale	Wendy Wood	17-Nov-71
1243	Scottish Stories: Duncan and the Mermaid	Traditional Scottish tale	Wendy Wood	18-Nov-71
1244	Scottish Stories: The Escape	Traditional Scottish tale	Wendy Wood	19-Nov-71
1245	The Cruise of the 'Happy-Go-Gay': Part 1 - Buying a Boat	Ursula Moray Williams	George Benson	22-Nov-71
1246	The Cruise of the 'Happy-Go-Gay': Part 2 - Annie	Ursula Moray Williams	George Benson	23-Nov-71
1247	The Cruise of the 'Happy-Go-Gay': Part 3 - Stowaways	Ursula Moray Williams	George Benson	24-Nov-71
1248	The Cruise of the 'Happy-Go-Gay': Part 4 - The Pirate Ship	Ursula Moray Williams	George Benson	25-Nov-71
1249	The Cruise of the 'Happy-Go-Gay': Part 5 - Prisoners in the Pit	Ursula Moray Williams	George Benson	26-Nov-71
1250	Animal Stories: Boy, the Cavalier		Bernard Hepton	29-Nov-71
1251	Animal Stories: Jacko		Vivien Heilbron	30-Nov-71
1252	Animal Stories: Alexander and Bucephalus	Traditional Greek tale	John Stride	01-Dec-71
1253	Animal Stories: Jumbo		Joe Melia	02-Dec-71
1254	Animal Stories: A Fox in the Vicarage	Jenny Nimmo	Ray Smith	03-Dec-71
1255	The Balloon People: Part 1 - Meeting the Balloonists	Ann Stone	John Bird	06-Dec-71
1256	The Balloon People: Part 2 - The Lead-Footer Menace	Ann Stone	John Bird	07-Dec-71
1257	The Balloon People: Part 3 - In Charge of the Farm	Ann Stone	John Bird	08-Dec-71
1258	The Balloon People: Part 4 - Figures Round a Bonfire	Ann Stone	John Bird	09-Dec-71
1259	The Balloon People: Part 5 - Midsummer Night's Battle	Ann Stone	John Bird	10-Dec-71
1260	Tucker's Countryside: Part 1 - John Robin	George Selden	Al Mancini	13-Dec-71
1261	Tucker's Countryside: Part 2 - The Old Meadow	George Selden	Al Mancini	14-Dec-71
1262	Tucker's Countryside: Part 3 - The Flood	George Selden	Al Mancini	15-Dec-71
1263	Tucker's Countryside: Part 4 - The Picket Line	George Selden	Al Mancini	16-Dec-71
1264	Tucker's Countryside: Part 5 - Hedley Day	George Selden	Al Mancini	17-Dec-71
1265	The Armourer's House: Part 1 - London Town	Rosemary Sutcliff	Janina Faye	20-Dec-71
1266	The Armourer's House: Part 2 - Midsummer Magic	Rosemary Sutcliff	Janina Faye	21-Dec-71
1267	The Armourer's House: Part 3 - The New World	Rosemary Sutcliff	Janina Faye	22-Dec-71
1268	The Armourer's House: Part 4 - Hallowe'en	Rosemary Sutcliff	Janina Faye	23-Dec-71
1269	The Armourer's House: Part 5 - Christmas	Rosemary Sutcliff	Janina Faye	24-Dec-71
1270	The Sorcerer's Apprentice	Barbara Shook Hazen	Freddie Jones	29-Dec-71
1271	Tamara and the Sea-Witch/The Witch's Cat	Krystyna Turska/Harwood Thompson	Freddie Jones	30-Dec-71
1272	The Bee-Man of Orn	Frank R. Stockton	Freddie Jones	31-Dec-71

== 1972 ==
Episode	Story	Written by	Read by	Original air date
1273	The Jester Who Fooled a King		Bernard Cribbins	03-Jan-72
1274	Cap o'Rushes	Traditional English Tale	Bernard Cribbins	04-Jan-72
1275	Beauty and the Beast		Bernard Cribbins	05-Jan-72
1276	The Four Seasons		Bernard Cribbins	06-Jan-72
1277	The Emperor's New Clothes	Hans Christian Andersen	Bernard Cribbins	07-Jan-72
1278	The Outlanders: Boy	Helen Cresswell	John Neville	10-Jan-72
1279	The Outlanders: Emily	Helen Cresswell	John Neville	11-Jan-72
1280	The Outlanders: The Mid-lands	Helen Cresswell	John Neville	12-Jan-72
1281	The Outlanders: The Golden Arrow	Helen Cresswell	John Neville	13-Jan-72
1282	The Outlanders: The Outlands	Helen Cresswell	John Neville	14-Jan-72
1283	The Railway Stories: Tank Engine Thomas Again	Rev. Wilbert Awdry	Ted Ray	17-Jan-72
1284	The Railway Stories: James the Red Engine	Rev. Wilbert Awdry	Ted Ray	18-Jan-72
1285	The Railway Stories: Troublesome Engines	Rev. Wilbert Awdry	Ted Ray	19-Jan-72
1286	The Railway Stories: Percy the Small Engine	Rev. Wilbert Awdry	Ted Ray	20-Jan-72
1287	The Railway Stories: Edward the Blue Engine	Rev. Wilbert Awdry	Ted Ray	21-Jan-72
1288	Polish Stories: The Black Goat		Sandor Elès	24-Jan-72
1289	Polish Stories: Krakus and the Dragon		Sandor Elès	25-Jan-72
1290	Polish Stories: Janek, the Fiddler		Sandor Elès	26-Jan-72
1291	Polish Stories: Klip and Klap		Sandor Elès	27-Jan-72
1292	Polish Stories: Anna and the Blue Rose		Sandor Elès	28-Jan-72
1293	Parcel for Henry: Part 1 - The Discovery	Paul Ries Collin	Richard Wattis	31-Jan-72
1294	Parcel for Henry: Part 2 - High Tide	Paul Ries Collin	Richard Wattis	1-Feb-72
1295	Up Pepper Alley, Down Goose Lane: Part 1 - Number 4½	Paul Ries Collin	Richard Wattis	2-Feb-72
1296	Up Pepper Alley, Down Goose Lane: Part 2 - Golden Delicious	Paul Ries Collin	Richard Wattis	3-Feb-72
1297	Up Pepper Alley, Down Goose Lane: Part 3 - The Siege of Friday Market	Paul Ries Collin	Richard Wattis	4-Feb-72
1298	Jemima and the Welsh Rabbit: Part 1 - The Grands and the Sleepers	Gillian Avery	Colin Jeavons	7-Feb-72
1299	Jemima and the Welsh Rabbit: Part 2 - The Boy who knew all about Trains	Gillian Avery	Colin Jeavons	8-Feb-72
1300	Jemima and the Welsh Rabbit: Part 3 - Enter Sir Lancelot Clinton	Gillian Avery	Colin Jeavons	9-Feb-72
1301	Jemima and the Welsh Rabbit: Part 4 - Jemima plans a Revolution	Gillian Avery	Colin Jeavons	10-Feb-72
1302	Jemima and the Welsh Rabbit: Part 5 - The Welsh Rabbit runs on time	Gillian Avery	Colin Jeavons	11-Feb-72
1303	Tales from Moominvalley: The Invisible Child	Tove Jansson	James Bolam	14-Feb-72
1304	Tales from Moominvalley: The Secret of the Hattifatteners	Tove Jansson	James Bolam	15-Feb-72
1305	Tales from Moominvalley: The Hemulen who loved silence	Tove Jansson	James Bolam	16-Feb-72
1306	Tales from Moominvalley: The Fillyjonk who believed in Disasters	Tove Jansson	James Bolam	17-Feb-72
1307	Tales from Moominvalley: The Last Dragon in the World	Tove Jansson	James Bolam	18-Feb-72
1308	The Little Broomstick: Things That Go Bump in the Night (Postponed from 21 February)	Mary Stewart	Geraldine McEwan	6-Mar-72
1309	The Little Broomstick: Will You Walk Into My Parlour? (Postponed from 22 February)	Mary Stewart	Geraldine McEwan	7-Mar-72
1310	The Little Broomstick: Can I Get There by Candlelight? (Postponed from 23 February)	Mary Stewart	Geraldine McEwan	8-Mar-72
1311	The Little Broomstick: Ride Away, Ride Away (Postponed from 24 February)	Mary Stewart	Geraldine McEwan	9-Mar-72
1312	The Little Broomstick: Home Again, Home Again. (Postponed from 25 February)	Mary Stewart	Geraldine McEwan	10-Mar-72
1313	Saturday and the Irish Aunt: Part 1 - The Will is Read (Postponed from 28 February)	Jenifer Wayne	Sheila Hancock	13-Mar-72
1314	Saturday and the Irish Aunt: Part 2 - Ben Tries to Buy a Cow (Postponed from 29 February)	Jenifer Wayne	Sheila Hancock	14-Feb-72
1315	Saturday and the Irish Aunt: Part 3 - Jessica starts Boiling (Postponed from 1 March)	Jenifer Wayne	Sheila Hancock	15-Mar-72
1316	Saturday and the Irish Aunt: Part 4 - Nonnie Makes up her Mind (Postponed from 2 March)	Jenifer Wayne	Sheila Hancock	16-Mar-72
1317	Saturday and the Irish Aunt: Part 5 - The Secret of the Will (Postponed from 3 March)	Jenifer Wayne	Sheila Hancock	17-Mar-72
1318	The Legend of Bala Lake	Traditional Welsh tale	Ray Smith	20-Mar-72
1319	Long, Broad and Quickeye	Traditional Bohemian tale	Freddie Jones	21-Mar-72
1320	Rhiannon	Traditional Welsh tale	Ray Smith	22-Mar-72
1321	The Magician's Housewife	Traditional Welsh tale	Ray Smith	23-Mar-72
1322	Where Arthur Sleeps	Traditional Welsh tale	Ray Smith	24-Mar-72
1323	Timmy Tiptoes and Tom Kitten	Beatrix Potter	Dandy Nichols	27-Mar-72
1324	Johnny Town-mouse and Two Bad Mice	Beatrix Potter	Dandy Nichols	28-Mar-72
1325	Benjamin Bunny and the Flopsy Bunnies	Beatrix Potter	Dandy Nichols	29-Mar-72
1326	Mrs Tiggy-Winkle and Mr Jeremy Fisher	Beatrix Potter	Dandy Nichols	30-Mar-72
1327	The Mermaid of Zennor	Traditional Cornish Tale	Francis Monk	10-Apr-72
1328	Giants and Skillywiddens	Traditional Cornish Tale	Francis Monk	11-Apr-72
1329	The Knockers	Traditional Cornish Tale	Francis Monk	12-Apr-72
1330	The Spriggan of St Ives	Traditional Cornish Tale	Francis Monk	13-Apr-72
1331	Tregeagle	Traditional Cornish Tale	Francis Monk	14-Apr-72
1332	Dragon in Danger: Part 1 - A Walk with a Dragon	Rosemary Manning	Roy Kinnear	17-Apr-72
1333	Dragon in Danger: Part 2 - Pageant Plans	Rosemary Manning	Roy Kinnear	18-Apr-72
1334	Dragon in Danger: Part 3 - The Men from Potterfield	Rosemary Manning	Roy Kinnear	19-Apr-72
1335	Dragon in Danger: Part 4 - Kidnapped	Rosemary Manning	Roy Kinnear	20-Apr-72
1336	Dragon in Danger: Part 5 - Saved!	Rosemary Manning	Roy Kinnear	21-Apr-72
1337	The Honeywell Badger: Part 1 - Wanted: A Badger	Joyce Stranger	Ronald Hines	24-Apr-72
1338	The Honeywell Badger: Part 2 - The Trap Sprung	Joyce Stranger	Ronald Hines	25-Apr-72
1339	The Honeywell Badger: Part 3 - Digger Moves In	Joyce Stranger	Ronald Hines	26-Apr-72
1340	The Honeywell Badger: Part 4 - Wild Beast at Large	Joyce Stranger	Ronald Hines	27-Apr-72
1341	The Honeywell Badger: Part 5 - The Sanctuary	Joyce Stranger	Ronald Hines	28-Apr-72
1342	Story from England: The Green Children	Kevin Crossley-Holland	Bryan Marshall	01-May-72
1343	Story from India: Taresh the Tea Planter	William Papas	Bryan Marshall	02-May-72
1344	Story from Greece: Elias the Fisherman	William Papas	Bryan Marshall	03-May-72
1345	Stories from Italy: Androcles and the Lion/The Hat	Elizabeth and Gerald Rose/Tomi Ungerer	Bryan Marshall	04-May-72
1346	Story from Japan: The Island	Ian Ribbons	Bryan Marshall	05-May-72
1347	Sula: Part 1 - First Meeting	Lavinia Derwent	John Cairney	08-May-72
1348	Sula: Part 2 - Mr Skinnymalink	Lavinia Derwent	John Cairney	09-May-72
1349	Sula: Part 3 - The Painted Yacht	Lavinia Derwent	John Cairney	10-May-72
1350	Sula: Part 4 - A Midnight Adventure	Lavinia Derwent	John Cairney	11-May-72
1351	Sula: Part 5 - A Stormy Night	Lavinia Derwent	John Cairney	12-May-72
1352	The Escaped Black Mamba and Other Things: Part 1 - Hide-and-Seek	Joan Aiken	Bernard Cribbins	15-May-72
1353	The Escaped Black Mamba and Other Things: Part 2 - Arabel Wins the Jackpot	Joan Aiken	Bernard Cribbins	16-May-72
1354	The Escaped Black Mamba and Other Things: Part 3 - Cheese Mambas and Poison Gas	Joan Aiken	Bernard Cribbins	17-May-72
1355	The Escaped Black Mamba and Other Things: Part 4 - The Plot Thickens	Joan Aiken	Bernard Cribbins	18-May-72
1356	The Escaped Black Mamba and Other Things: Part 5 - Home Sweet Home	Joan Aiken	Bernard Cribbins	19-May-72
1357	Littlenose the Hunter: The Lemmings	John Grant		22-May-72
1358	Littlenose the Hunter: The Learner Hunter	John Grant		23-May-72
1359	Littlenose the Hunter: The Long Journey	John Grant		24-May-72
1360	Littlenose the Hunter: Two-Eyes' Revenge	John Grant		25-May-72
1361	Littlenose the Hunter: The Musk Oxen	John Grant		26-May-72
1362	Animals	Stories and Poems written by Children	Alex Glasgow & Henry Livings	30-May-72
1363	People	Stories and Poems written by Children	Alex Glasgow & Henry Livings	31-May-72
1364	Games and Pastimes	Stories and Poems written by Children	Alex Glasgow & Henry Livings	01-Jun-72
1365	Odd-bods	Stories and Poems written by Children	Alex Glasgow & Henry Livings	02-Jun-72
1366	Tecwyn, the Last of the Welsh Dragons: Part 1 - A Very Small Dragon	Mary Dawson	Glyn Houston	05-Jun-72
1367	Tecwyn, the Last of the Welsh Dragons: Part 2 - Tecwyn Earns his Keep	Mary Dawson	Glyn Houston	06-Jun-72
1368	Tecwyn, the Last of the Welsh Dragons: Part 3 - Fire! Fire!	Mary Dawson	Glyn Houston	07-Jun-72
1369	Tecwyn, the Last of the Welsh Dragons: Part 4 - Megan has an Idea	Mary Dawson	Glyn Houston	08-Jun-72
1370	Tecwyn, the Last of the Welsh Dragons: Part 5 - Just in Time	Mary Dawson	Glyn Houston	09-Jun-72
1371	Sprout: Part 1 - Sprout Goes to School	Jenifer Wayne	Ann Morrish	12-Jun-72
1372	Sprout: Part 2 - Sprout Wants an Elephant	Jenifer Wayne	Ann Morrish	13-Jun-72
1373	Sprout: Part 3 - Sprout Sets Out for the Zoo	Jenifer Wayne	Ann Morrish	14-Jun-72
1374	Sprout: Part 4 - Sprout Goes Riding	Jenifer Wayne	Ann Morrish	15-Jun-72
1375	Sprout: Part 5 - Sprout Finds an Elephant	Jenifer Wayne	Ann Morrish	16-Jun-72
1376	Stories from How the Whale Became: How the Fox Came to be Where It Is	Ted Hughes	Stephen Thorne	19-Jun-72
1377	Stories from How the Whale Became: How the Bee Became	Ted Hughes	Stephen Thorne	20-Jun-72
1378	Stories from How the Whale Became: How the Donkey Became	Ted Hughes	Stephen Thorne	21-Jun-72
1379	Stories from How the Whale Became: How the Tortoise Became	Ted Hughes	Stephen Thorne	22-Jun-72
1380	Stories from How the Whale Became: How the Elephant Became	Ted Hughes	Stephen Thorne	23-Jun-72
1381	Arlo the Dandy Lion: Part 1 - The Red Trunk	Morris Lurie	John Le Mesurier	11-Sep-72
1382	Arlo the Dandy Lion: Part 2 - Ten Million People	Morris Lurie	John Le Mesurier	12-Sep-72
1383	The Twenty-Seventh Annual African Hippopotamus Race: Part 1 - Six Days to Go	Morris Lurie	John Le Mesurier	13-Sep-72
1384	The Twenty-Seventh Annual African Hippopotamus Race: Part 2 - The Mighty Zamboola	Morris Lurie	John Le Mesurier	14-Sep-72
1385	The Twenty-Seventh Annual African Hippopotamus Race: Part 3 - On Your Marks!	Morris Lurie	John Le Mesurier	15-Sep-72
1386	Mrs Pepperpot's Outing: Part 1 - Something in the Ice Cream	Alf Prøysen	Thora Hird	18-Sep-72
1387	Mrs Pepperpot's Outing: Part 2 - Have you seen a doll?	Alf Prøysen	Thora Hird	19-Sep-72
1388	Mrs Pepperpot's Outing: Part 3 - Puppy on the Roof	Alf Prøysen	Thora Hird	20-Sep-72
1389	Mrs Pepperpot's Outing: Part 4 - Food for the Fox	Alf Prøysen	Thora Hird	21-Sep-72
1390	Mrs Pepperpot's Outing: Part 5 - Home Again	Alf Prøysen	Thora Hird	22-Sep-72
1391	Albert: Part 1 - Albert meets Henry	Alison Jezard	Harry Fowler	25-Sep-72
1392	Albert: Part 2 - Albert fills a space	Alison Jezard	Harry Fowler	26-Sep-72
1393	Albert: Part 3 - Albert Kicks Off	Alison Jezard	Harry Fowler	27-Sep-72
1394	Albert: Part 4 - Albert in Scotland	Alison Jezard	Harry Fowler	28-Sep-72
1395	Albert: Part 5 - Albert goes Home	Alison Jezard	Harry Fowler	29-Sep-72
1396	The Nuns Go To Penguin Island	Jonathan Routh	Jonathan Routh	02-Oct-72
1397	The Nuns Go To Africa	Jonathan Routh	Jonathan Routh	03-Oct-72
1398	The Nuns Go East	Jonathan Routh	Jonathan Routh	04-Oct-72
1399	The Nuns Go Car-Racing	Jonathan Routh	Jonathan Routh	05-Oct-72
1400	The Nuns Go West	Jonathan Routh	Jonathan Routh	06-Oct-72
1401	Agaton Sax and the Max Brothers: Part 1 - A Crime and a Clue	Nils-Olof Franzén	Kenneth Williams	09-Oct-72
1402	Agaton Sax and the Max Brothers: Part 2 - A Tight Squeeze	Nils-Olof Franzén	Kenneth Williams	10-Oct-72
1403	Agaton Sax and the Max Brothers: Part 3 - Deep Disguises	Nils-Olof Franzén	Kenneth Williams	11-Oct-72
1404	Agaton Sax and the Max Brothers: Part 4 - Aunt Matilda Touches Down	Nils-Olof Franzén	Kenneth Williams	12-Oct-72
1405	Agaton Sax and the Max Brothers: Part 5 - Calling All Cars	Nils-Olof Franzén	Kenneth Williams	13-Oct-72
1406	The Last Straw: Part 1 - Poppy	Margaret J. Baker	Gilbert Wynne	16-Oct-72
1407	The Last Straw: Part 2 - The First Outing	Margaret J. Baker	Gilbert Wynne	17-Oct-72
1408	The Last Straw: Part 3 - Harvest Festival	Margaret J. Baker	Gilbert Wynne	18-Oct-72
1409	The Last Straw: Part 4 - Explanations - and a Party	Margaret J. Baker	Gilbert Wynne	19-Oct-72
1410	The Last Straw: Part 5 - Forward and Back Again	Margaret J. Baker	Gilbert Wynne	20-Oct-72
1411	A Boat and Bax: Part 1 - No More School	Roger Collinson	Kenneth Cope	23-Oct-72
1412	A Boat and Bax: Part 2 - The Discovery	Roger Collinson	Kenneth Cope	24-Oct-72
1413	A Boat and Bax: Part 3 - The Launching	Roger Collinson	Kenneth Cope	25-Oct-72
1414	A Boat and Bax: Part 4 - A Blow is Struck	Roger Collinson	Kenneth Cope	26-Oct-72
1415	A Boat and Bax: Part 5 - Operation Night Run	Roger Collinson	Kenneth Cope	27-Oct-72
1416	The Legend of Roland: Part 1 - The Twelve Peers	Traditional French tale	Alfred Lynch	30-Oct-72
1417	The Legend of Roland: Part 2 - The Betrayal	Traditional French tale	Alfred Lynch	31-Oct-72
1418	The Legend of Roland: Part 3 - The Battle	Traditional French tale	Alfred Lynch	01-Nov-72
1419	The Legend of Roland: Part 4	Traditional French tale	Alfred Lynch	02-Nov-72
1420	The Legend of Roland: Part 5 - The Revenge	Traditional French tale	Alfred Lynch	03-Nov-72
1421	News Extra: A Middle Sized Fish	Roy Brown	Joe Melia	06-Nov-72
1422	News Extra: A Lightning Cure	Roy Brown	Joe Melia	07-Nov-72
1423	News Extra: Football Fever	Roy Brown	Joe Melia	08-Nov-72
1424	News Extra: Part 1 - A Day by the Sea	Roy Brown	Joe Melia	09-Nov-72
1425	News Extra: Part 2 - A Day by the Sea	Roy Brown	Joe Melia	10-Nov-72
1426	Mary Plain Goes to America: Part 1 - An Invitation	Gwynedd Rae	Richard Wattis	13-Nov-72
1427	Mary Plain Goes to America: Part 2 - The Most Popular Person on Board	Gwynedd Rae	Richard Wattis	14-Nov-72
1428	Mary Plain Goes to America: Part 3 - Mary the Hero	Gwynedd Rae	Richard Wattis	15-Nov-72
1429	Mary Plain Goes to America: Part 4 - Hollywood's Newest Star	Gwynedd Rae	Richard Wattis	16-Nov-72
1430	Film Makers: Part 1 - The Man Who Was Mickey!	Howard Kennett	Ted Ray	20-Nov-72
1431	Film Makers: Part 2 - Anything for Laughs!	Howard Kennett	Ted Ray	21-Nov-72
1432	Film Makers: Part 3 - Another Fine Mess!	Howard Kennett	Ted Ray	22-Nov-72
1433	Film Makers: Part 4 - Now you see it now you don't!	Howard Kennett	Ted Ray	23-Nov-72
1434	The Path of Gold: Part 1 - Suppose, only suppose	James Reeves	Michael Jayston	27-Nov-72
1435	The Path of Gold: Part 2 - Castle Aldergard	James Reeves	Michael Jayston	28-Nov-72
1436	The Path of Gold: Part 3 - Long Live the King!	James Reeves	Michael Jayston	29-Nov-72
1437	The Path of Gold: Part 4 - United Kingdoms	James Reeves	Michael Jayston	30-Nov-72
1438	The Tale of Mrs. Tittlemouse/The Tale of Two Bad Mice	Beatrix Potter	Lesley Nunnerley	04-Dec-72
1439	The Pocket Mouse	Barbara Willard	Lesley Nunnerley	05-Dec-72
1440	The Church Mouse	Graham Oakley	Lesley Nunnerley	06-Dec-72
1441	The Magnificent Four/The Wizard of Wallaby Wallow	Brian Anson/Jack Kent	Lesley Nunnerley	07-Dec-72
1442	A Harp of Fishbones: Mrs Nutti's Fireplace	Joan Aiken	Ray Brooks	11-Dec-72
1443	A Harp of Fishbones: The Rose of Puddle Fratrum	Joan Aiken	Ray Brooks	12-Dec-72
1444	A Harp of Fishbones: The Prince of Darkness	Joan Aiken	Ray Brooks	13-Dec-72
1445	A Harp of Fishbones: The Lost Five Minutes	Joan Aiken	Ray Brooks	14-Dec-72
1446	The Iron Man: Part 1 - The Coming of the Iron Man	Ted Hughes	Denholm Elliott	18-Dec-72
1447	The Iron Man: Part 2 - What's to be done with the Iron Man?	Ted Hughes	Denholm Elliott	19-Dec-72
1448	The Iron Man: Part 3 - The Space-Being and the Iron Man	Ted Hughes	Denholm Elliott	20-Dec-72
1449	The Iron Man: Part 4 - The Iron Man's Challenge	Ted Hughes	Denholm Elliott	21-Dec-72

== 1973 ==
Episode	Story	Written by	Read by	Original air date
1450	Just So Stories: The Elephant's Child	Rudyard Kipling	Michael Hordern	01-Jan-73
1451	Just So Stories: The Beginning of the Armadilloes	Rudyard Kipling	Michael Hordern	02-Jan-73
1452	Just So Stories: The Cat That Walked by Himself	Rudyard Kipling	Michael Hordern	03-Jan-73
1453	Just So Stories: The Butterfly That Stamped	Rudyard Kipling	Michael Hordern	04-Jan-73
1454	Just So Stories: How the Leopard got his Spots	Rudyard Kipling	Michael Hordern	05-Jan-73
1455	Wizards are a Nuisance: Wizards are a Nuisance	Norman Hunter	Russell Hunter	08-Jan-73
1456	Wizards are a Nuisance: The lce Cream Wizard	Norman Hunter	Russell Hunter	09-Jan-73
1457	Wizards are a Nuisance: A Wizard by Mistake	Norman Hunter	Russell Hunter	10-Jan-73
1458	Wizards are a Nuisance: The Wizard Who Lost his Temper	Norman Hunter	Russell Hunter	11-Jan-73
1459	Wizards are a Nuisance: Wizards Strictly Prohibited	Norman Hunter	Russell Hunter	12-Jan-73
1460	The Three Toymakers: Part 1 - Peter Toymaker and Young Rudi	Ursula Moray Williams	Patrick Troughton	15-Jan-73
1461	The Three Toymakers: Part 2 - Marta	Ursula Moray Williams	Patrick Troughton	16-Jan-73
1462	The Three Toymakers: Part 3 - Malkin's Revenge	Ursula Moray Williams	Patrick Troughton	17-Jan-73
1463	The Three Toymakers: Part 4 - Anders's Adventure	Ursula Moray Williams	Patrick Troughton	18-Jan-73
1464	The Three Toymakers: Part 5 - The King's Prize	Ursula Moray Williams	Patrick Troughton	19-Jan-73
1465	Tommy Mac: Part 1 - Unwelcome Help	Margaret Stuart Barry	Norman Rossington	22-Jan-73
1466	Tommy Mac: Part 2 - The Newcomer	Margaret Stuart Barry	Norman Rossington	23-Jan-73
1467	Tommy Mac: Part 3 - The New Leaf	Margaret Stuart Barry	Norman Rossington	24-Jan-73
1468	Tommy Mac: Part 4 - Up the Great North	Margaret Stuart Barry	Norman Rossington	25-Jan-73
1469	Tommy Mac: Part 5 - The Finding Club	Margaret Stuart Barry	Norman Rossington	26-Jan-73
1470	The Blind Boy and the Loon and Other Eskimo Myths: The Blind Boy and the Loon	Ramona Maher	Blain Fairman	29-Jan-73
1471	The Blind Boy and the Loon and Other Eskimo Myths: The Man Who Married a Snow Goose	Ramona Maher	Blain Fairman	30-Jan-73
1472	The Blind Boy and the Loon and Other Eskimo Myths: The Moon Husband	Ramona Maher	Blain Fairman	31-Jan-73
1473	The Blind Boy and the Loon and Other Eskimo Myths: The Cruel Uncle	Ramona Maher	Blain Fairman	01-Feb-73
1474	The Blind Boy and the Loon and Other Eskimo Myths: The Hardhearted Rich Man	Ramona Maher	Blain Fairman	02-Feb-73
1475	Nordy Bank: Part 1 - A Camp on the Hill	Sheena Porter	Rosemary Leach	05-Feb-73
1476	Nordy Bank: Part 2 - Wolf!	Sheena Porter	Rosemary Leach	06-Feb-73
1477	Nordy Bank: Part 3 - Alone on the Hill	Sheena Porter	Rosemary Leach	07-Feb-73
1478	Nordy Bank: Part 4 - Out of the Question	Sheena Porter	Rosemary Leach	08-Feb-73
1479	Nordy Bank: Part 5 - If Anyone Can Do It....	Sheena Porter	Rosemary Leach	09-Feb-73
1480	Moominsummer Madness: A Haunted House	Tove Jansson	Judi Dench	13-Feb-73
1481	Moominsummer Madness: Midsummer's Eve	Tove Jansson	Judi Dench	14-Feb-73
1482	Moominsummer Madness: The Dress Rehearsal	Tove Jansson	Judi Dench	15-Feb-73
1483	Moominsummer Madness: The First Night	Tove Jansson	Judi Dench	16-Feb-73
1484	Tom Ass: Part 1 - The Elf-Woman	Ann Lawrence	Anne Stallybrass	19-Feb-73
1485	Tom Ass: Part 2 - The Journey	Ann Lawrence	Anne Stallybrass	20-Feb-73
1486	Tom Ass: Part 3 - London Town	Ann Lawrence	Anne Stallybrass	21-Feb-73
1487	Tom Ass: Part 4 - Working	Ann Lawrence	Anne Stallybrass	22-Feb-73
1488	Tom Ass: Part 5 - Success	Ann Lawrence	Anne Stallybrass	23-Feb-73
1489	Eranga and Prianga's Travels in Sri Lanka	Stories from Sri Lanka	Eranga and Prianga Pieris	26-Feb-73
1490	The Golden Tree	Stories from Sri Lanka	Eranga and Prianga Pieris	27-Feb-73
1491	The Fortune Hunters	Stories from Sri Lanka	Eranga and Prianga Pieris	28-Feb-73
1492	The Glass Princess	Stories from Sri Lanka	Eranga and Prianga Pieris	01-Mar-73
1493	The Black Storks' Friends	Stories from Sri Lanka	Eranga and Prianga Pieris	02-Mar-73
1494	The Long-Haired Donkey	William Papas	Wally Whyton	05-Mar-73
1495	Fortunata	Joan Murray Simpson	Wally Whyton	07-Mar-73
1496	The Little Sauce Man by	Joan Murray Simpson	Wally Whyton	08-Mar-73
1497	The King Who Talked to the Animals	Joan Murray Simpson	Wally Whyton	09-Mar-73
1498	Mrs Frisby and the Rats of Nimh: Part 1 - The Sickness of Timothy Frisby	Robert C. O'Brien	Anthony Quayle	12-Mar-73
1499	Mrs Frisby and the Rats of Nimh: Part 2 - A Favour from Jeremy	Robert C. O'Brien	Anthony Quayle	13-Mar-73
1500	Mrs Frisby and the Rats of Nimh: Part 3 - In the Rosebush	Robert C. O'Brien	Anthony Quayle	14-Mar-73
1501	Mrs Frisby and the Rats of Nimh: Part 4 - In the Cage	Robert C. O'Brien	Anthony Quayle	15-Mar-73
1502	Mrs Frisby and the Rats of Nimh: Part 5 - Escape	Robert C. O'Brien	Anthony Quayle	16-Mar-73
1503	Ballet Shoes for Anna: Part 1 - The Earthquake	Noel Streatfeild	Rosalie Crutchley	19-Mar-73
1504	Ballet Shoes for Anna: Part 2 - The Uncle and Aunt	Noel Streatfeild	Rosalie Crutchley	20-Mar-73
1505	Ballet Shoes for Anna: Part 3 - Dancing lessons	Noel Streatfeild	Rosalie Crutchley	21-Mar-73
1506	Ballet Shoes for Anna: Part 4 - Money	Noel Streatfeild	Rosalie Crutchley	22-Mar-73
1507	Ballet Shoes for Anna: Part 5 - Thieves in the Night	Noel Streatfeild	Rosalie Crutchley	23-Mar-73
1508	The Incredible Journey: Part 1 - The Journey Begins	Sheila Burnford	Blain Fairman	26-Mar-73
1509	The Incredible Journey: Part 2 - The Dam Bursts	Sheila Burnford	Blain Fairman	27-Mar-73
1510	The Incredible Journey: Part 3 - Tao faces a Killer	Sheila Burnford	Blain Fairman	28-Mar-73
1511	The Incredible Journey: Part 4 - The Reunion	Sheila Burnford	Blain Fairman	29-Mar-73
1512	The Incredible Journey: Part 5 - The Last Fifty Miles	Sheila Burnford	Blain Fairman	30-Mar-73
1513	The Treasure Seekers: Part 1 - Ways and Means	E. Nesbit	Cyril Luckham	02-Apr-73
1514	The Treasure Seekers: Part 2 - Kill or Cure	E. Nesbit	Cyril Luckham	03-Apr-73
1515	The Treasure Seekers: Part 3 - Being Bandits	E. Nesbit	Cyril Luckham	04-Apr-73
1516	The Treasure Seekers: Part 4 - Castilian Amoroso	E. Nesbit	Cyril Luckham	05-Apr-73
1517	The Treasure Seekers: Part 5 - The Indian Uncle	E. Nesbit	Cyril Luckham	06-Apr-73
1518	Kate and the Island: Part 1 - Going Away	Catherine Storr	Keith Barron	09-Apr-73
1519	Kate and the Island: Part 2 - Kate makes Friends	Catherine Storr	Keith Barron	10-Apr-73
1520	Kate and the Island: Part 3 - Kate goes Exploring	Catherine Storr	Keith Barron	11-Apr-73
1521	Kate and the Island: Part 4 - The Discovery	Catherine Storr	Keith Barron	12-Apr-73
1522	Pegasus	Ancient Greek mythology	Keith Barron	13-Apr-73
1523	The Dagger and the Bird: Part 1 - Window on Darkness	Margaret Greaves	Michael Bryant	16-Apr-73
1524	The Dagger and the Bird: Part 2 - A Stranger on the Bridge	Margaret Greaves	Michael Bryant	17-Apr-73
1525	The Dagger and the Bird: Part 3 - Fear in the Forest	Margaret Greaves	Michael Bryant	18-Apr-73
1526	The Dagger and the Bird: Part 4 - The Last Danger	Margaret Greaves	Michael Bryant	19-Apr-73
1527	Return to Sula: Part 1 - Across to Cronan	Lavinia Derwent	John Cairney	24-Apr-73
1528	Return to Sula: Part 2 - Adventure at Midnight	Lavinia Derwent	John Cairney	25-Apr-73
1529	Return to Sula: Part 3 - Life and Death	Lavinia Derwent	John Cairney	26-Apr-73
1530	Return to Sula: Part 4 - Revenge	Lavinia Derwent	John Cairney	27-Apr-73
1531	Up the Pier: Part 1 - The Gulls	Helen Cresswell	Hannah Gordon	30-Apr-73
1532	Up the Pier: Part 2 - Carrie meets the Pontifexes	Helen Cresswell	Hannah Gordon	01-May-73
1533	Up the Pier: Part 3 - Footsteps!	Helen Cresswell	Hannah Gordon	02-May-73
1534	Up the Pier: Part 4 - Invisible for ever?	Helen Cresswell	Hannah Gordon	03-May-73
1535	Up the Pier: Part 5 - Set Free	Helen Cresswell	Hannah Gordon	04-May-73
1536	The Cricket in Times Square: Part 1 - Chester in New York	George Selden	Al Mancini	07-May-73
1537	The Cricket in Times Square: Part 2 - Chinatown	George Selden	Al Mancini	08-May-73
1538	The Cricket in Times Square: Part 3 - Chester's Dream	George Selden	Al Mancini	09-May-73
1539	The Cricket in Times Square: Part 4 - Fame	George Selden	Al Mancini	10-May-73
1540	The Cricket in Times Square: Part 5 - Chester goes Home	George Selden	Al Mancini	11-May-73
1541	Hags by Starlight: Part 1 - The Truth Drug	Lorna Wood	Vivian Pickles	14-May-73
1542	Hags by Starlight: Part 2 - Bats for Breakfast	Lorna Wood	Vivian Pickles	15-May-73
1543	Hags by Starlight: Part 3 - A Thousand Pounds	Lorna Wood	Vivian Pickles	16-May-73
1544	Hags by Starlight: Part 4 - A Frog Prince	Lorna Wood	Vivian Pickles	17-May-73
1545	Hags by Starlight: Part 5 - A Crock of Gold	Lorna Wood	Vivian Pickles	18-May-73
1546	Viewers' Stories	Stories written by Children	Alex Marshall & Ray Brooks	21-May-73
1547	The Thomas Book: Part 1 - Meet the Family	Reginald Rose	Leo Genn	22-May-73
1548	The Thomas Book: Part 2 - The Elephant	Reginald Rose	Leo Genn	23-May-73
1549	The Thomas Book: Part 3 - The Parade	Reginald Rose	Leo Genn	24-May-73
1550	Viewers' Stories	Stories written by Children	Alex Marshall & Ray Brooks	25-May-73
1551	The Geranium of Flüt	Willie Rushton	Willie Rushton	29-May-73
1552	Barclay Golddust	Clement Freud	Clement Freud	30-May-73
1553	The Village without Music	Hans Andreus	Dudley Moore	31-May-73
1554	Badjelly the Witch	Spike Milligan		01-Jun-73
1555	The Mousedeer	Aisha Akbar	Pik-Sen Lim	04-Jun-73
1556	A Clever Trick	Aisha Akbar	Pik-Sen Lim	05-Jun-73
1557	The Princess and the Warrior	Aisha Akbar	Pik-Sen Lim	06-Jun-73
1558	Achilles the Donkey	H. E. Bates	Wally Whyton	14-Jun-73
1559	Scottish Stories: Muckle Mou'd Meg	Denise Cremona	Wally Whyton	18-Jun-73
1560	Scottish Stories: Tad Losgainn	Denise Cremona	Wally Whyton	19-Jun-73
1561	Scottish Stories: The Pedlar of Duns	Denise Cremona	Wally Whyton	20-Jun-73
1562	Scottish Stories: Whippety Stourie	Denise Cremona	Wally Whyton	21-Jun-73
1563	Scottish Stories: The Cattle of Glenuig	Denise Cremona	Wally Whyton	22-Jun-73
1563a	When Marnie Was There: 1: The Old House	Joan G. Robinson	Ann Bell	16-Jul-73
1563b	When Marnie Was There: 2: A Girl and a Boat	Joan G. Robinson	Ann Bell	17-Jul-73
1563c	When Marnie Was There: 3: "Look out for me again."	Joan G. Robinson	Ann Bell	18-Jul-73
1563d	When Marnie Was There: 4: The Windmill	Joan G. Robinson	Ann Bell	19-Jul-73
1563e	When Marnie Was There: 5: The Book	Joan G. Robinson	Ann Bell	20-Jul-73
1564	The Complete Book of Dragons: The Book of Beasts	E. Nesbit	Arthur Lowe	01-Oct-73
1565	The Complete Book of Dragons: Uncle James	E. Nesbit	Arthur Lowe	02-Oct-73
1566	The Complete Book of Dragons: Part 1 - The Island of the Nine Whirlpools	E. Nesbit	Arthur Lowe	03-Oct-73
1567	The Complete Book of Dragons: Part 2 - The Island of the Nine Whirlpools	E. Nesbit	Arthur Lowe	04-Oct-73
1568	The Complete Book of Dragons: The Last of the Dragons	E. Nesbit	Arthur Lowe	05-Oct-73
1569	A Bad Lot: Part 1 - The New Apprentice	Brian Glanville	Kenneth Cope	08-Oct-73
1570	A Bad Lot: Part 2 - The Siiffs	Brian Glanville	Kenneth Cope	09-Oct-73
1571	A Bad Lot: Part 3 - Promotion	Brian Glanville	Kenneth Cope	10-Oct-73
1572	A Bad Lot: Part 4 - Success for Rovers	Brian Glanville	Kenneth Cope	11-Oct-73
1573	The FA Cup Giantkillers		Martin Peters	12-Oct-73
1574	The Wind on the Moon: Part 1 - Naughtier Than Ever Before	Eric Linklater	Maurice Denham	15-Oct-73
1575	The Wind on the Moon: Part 2 - Revenge!	Eric Linklater	Maurice Denham	16-Oct-73
1576	The Wind on the Moon: Part 3 - Sir Lankester Lemon's Zoo	Eric Linklater	Maurice Denham	17-Oct-73
1577	The Wind on the Moon: Part 4 - Freedom for the Falcon	Eric Linklater	Maurice Denham	18-Oct-73
1578	The Wind on the Moon: Part 5 - The Ostrich Egg Thief	Eric Linklater	Maurice Denham	19-Oct-73
1579	The Wind on the Moon: Part 6 - A Letter with a Bloodstain	Eric Linklater	Maurice Denham	22-Oct-73
1580	The Wind on the Moon: Part 7 - Journey to Bombardy	Eric Linklater	Maurice Denham	23-Oct-73
1581	The Wind on the Moon: Part 8 - The Prisoners of Count Hulagu Bloot	Eric Linklater	Maurice Denham	24-Oct-73
1582	Hayseed and Company: Part 1 - Cutting and Baling	Ray Pope	Alfred Lynch	25-Oct-73
1583	Hayseed and Company: Part 2 - A Hard Bargain	Ray Pope	Alfred Lynch	26-Oct-73
1584	Pippi Goes Aboard: Part 1 - Pippi Longstocking Goes shopping	Astrid Lindgren	Patricia Routledge	29-Oct-73
1585	Pippi Goes Aboard: Part 2 - Pippi Longstocking Goes to the Fair	Astrid Lindgren	Patricia Routledge	30-Oct-73
1586	Pippi Goes Aboard: Part 3 - Pippi Longstocking Writes a Letter	Astrid Lindgren	Patricia Routledge	31-Oct-73
1587	Pippi Goes Aboard: Part 4 - Pippi Longstocking Has a Grand Visitor	Astrid Lindgren	Patricia Routledge	01-Nov-73
1588	Pippi Goes Aboard: Part 5 - Pippi Longstocking Gives a Party	Astrid Lindgren	Patricia Routledge	02-Nov-73
1589	An Older Kind of Magic: Part 1 - The Gardens	Patricia Wrightson	Dinsdale Landen	05-Nov-73
1590	An Older Kind of Magic: Part 2 - Threat to the Gardens	Patricia Wrightson	Dinsdale Landen	06-Nov-73
1591	An Older Kind of Magic: Part 3 - Ernest Hawke's Idea	Patricia Wrightson	Dinsdale Landen	07-Nov-73
1592	An Older Kind of Magic: Part 4 - Magic in the Air	Patricia Wrightson	Dinsdale Landen	08-Nov-73
1593	An Older Kind of Magic: Part 5 - The Comet	Patricia Wrightson	Dinsdale Landen	09-Nov-73
1594	The Princess and Curdie: Part 1 - The Mistress of the Silver Moon	George MacDonald	John Laurie	12-Nov-73
1595	The Princess and Curdie: Part 2 - Lina	George MacDonald	John Laurie	13-Nov-73
1596	The Princess and Curdie: Part 3 - The Wine Cellar	George MacDonald	John Laurie	14-Nov-73
1597	The Princess and Curdie: Part 4 - Dr Kelman	George MacDonald	John Laurie	15-Nov-73
1598	The Princess and Curdie: Part 5 - The King's Army	George MacDonald	John Laurie	16-Nov-73
1599	The Tinsel November: Part 1 - Arlechino swoons	Julia Rhys	Ronald Pickup	19-Nov-73
1600	The Tinsel November: Part 2 - Guy's Birthday		Ronald Pickup	20-Nov-73
1601	The Tinsel November: Part 3 - A Hollow Tree		Ronald Pickup	21-Nov-73
1602	The Tinsel November: Part 4 - The House in the Park		Ronald Pickup	22-Nov-73
1603	The Tinsel November: Part 5 - A New Master		Ronald Pickup	23-Nov-73
1604	Odin and the Apples of Youth	Norse mythology	Keith Buckley	26-Nov-73
1605	Thor's Journey to Utgard	Norse mythology	Keith Buckley	27-Nov-73
1606	Thor Loses his Hammer	Norse mythology	Keith Buckley	28-Nov-73
1607	Odin and the Poets' Mead	Norse mythology	Keith Buckley	29-Nov-73
1608	The Death of Balder	Norse mythology	Keith Buckley	30-Nov-73
1609	Nowhere to Stop: Part 1 - On the Dump	Geraldine Kaye	Michael Robbins	03-Dec-73
1610	Nowhere to Stop: Part 2 - A Barrow of Holly	Geraldine Kaye	Michael Robbins	04-Dec-73
1611	Nowhere to Stop: Part 3 - A Bucket of Water	Geraldine Kaye	Michael Robbins	05-Dec-73
1612	Nowhere to Stop: Part 4 - Chris's Letter	Geraldine Kaye	Michael Robbins	06-Dec-73
1613	Nowhere to Stop: Part 5 - A Place to Stop	Geraldine Kaye	Michael Robbins	07-Dec-73
1614	The Christmas Bower: Part 1 - Send for Uncle Willie	Polly Redford	Elaine Stritch	10-Dec-73
1615	The Christmas Bower: Part 2 - Disaster	Polly Redford	Elaine Stritch	11-Dec-73
1616	The Christmas Bower: Part 3 - Nuttalls to the rescue	Polly Redford	Elaine Stritch	12-Dec-73
1617	The Christmas Bower: Part 4 - The Family Row	Polly Redford	Elaine Stritch	13-Dec-73
1618	The Christmas Bower: Part 5 - The Best Christmas Ever	Polly Redford	Elaine Stritch	14-Dec-73
1619	The Thirteen Days of Christmas: Part 1 - A Partridge in a Pear Tree	Jenny Overton	Helen Mirren	17-Dec-73
1620	The Thirteen Days of Christmas: Part 2 - Four Calling Birds	Jenny Overton	Helen Mirren	18-Dec-73
1621	The Thirteen Days of Christmas: Part 3 - Eight Maids a-milking	Jenny Overton	Helen Mirren	19-Dec-73
1622	The Thirteen Days of Christmas: Part 4 - Eleven Drummers Drumming	Jenny Overton	Helen Mirren	20-Dec-73
1623	The Thirteen Days of Christmas: Part 5 - The Last Day of Christmas	Jenny Overton	Helen Mirren	21-Dec-73
1624	The Tailor of Gloucester	Beatrix Potter	Eileen Atkins	24-Dec-73
1625	The Story of Rapunzel	Brothers Grimm	Nicholas Pennell	28-Dec-73
1626	The Dogs of Drummond Hall	Jenny Nimmo	John Laurie	31-Dec-73

== 1974 ==
Episode	Story	Written by	Read by	Original air date
1627	The Birthday Unicorn: Part 1 - Alexander's Birthday	Janice Elliott	Roy Kinnear	02-Jan-74
1628	The Birthday Unicorn: Part 2 - Missing!	Janice Elliott	Roy Kinnear	03-Jan-74
1629	The Birthday Unicorn: Part 3 - The Magic Reign of the Unicorn	Janice Elliott	Roy Kinnear	04-Jan-74
1630	Tales of Incrediblania: The Home-made Dragon	Norman Hunter	Kenneth Williams	07-Jan-74
1631	Tales of Incrediblania: The Frantic Phantom	Norman Hunter	Kenneth Williams	08-Jan-74
1632	Tales of Incrediblania: The Unmerciful Music	Norman Hunter	Kenneth Williams	09-Jan-74
1633	Tales of Incrediblania: The Runaway Crown	Norman Hunter	Kenneth Williams	10-Jan-74
1634	Tales of Incrediblania: The Royal Present	Norman Hunter	Kenneth Williams	11-Jan-74
1635	Charlotte Sometimes: Part 1 - Who is Clare?	Penelope Farmer	Rosalie Crutchley	14-Jan-74
1636	Charlotte Sometimes: Part 2 - Why the Change?	Penelope Farmer	Rosalie Crutchley	15-Jan-74
1637	Charlotte Sometimes: Part 3 - When will the double life end?	Penelope Farmer	Rosalie Crutchley	16-Jan-74
1638	Charlotte Sometimes: Part 4 - Where is Emily?	Penelope Farmer	Rosalie Crutchley	17-Jan-74
1639	Charlotte Sometimes: Part 5 - Charlotte Forever	Penelope Farmer	Rosalie Crutchley	18-Jan-74
1640	The Long Winter: Part 1 - The First Blizzard	Laura Ingalls Wilder	Eileen Atkins	21-Jan-74
1641	The Long Winter: Part 2 - Heap Big Snow	Laura Ingalls Wilder	Eileen Atkins	22-Jan-74
1642	The Long Winter: Part 3 - Mr Edwards Visits	Laura Ingalls Wilder	Eileen Atkins	23-Jan-74
1643	The Long Winter: Part 4 - No Trains	Laura Ingalls Wilder	Eileen Atkins	24-Jan-74
1644	The Long Winter: Part 5 - Christmas	Laura Ingalls Wilder	Eileen Atkins	25-Jan-74
1645	The Long Winter: Part 6 - Seed Wheat	Laura Ingalls Wilder	Eileen Atkins	28-Jan-74
1646	The Long Winter: Part 7 - A Daring Journey	Laura Ingalls Wilder	Eileen Atkins	29-Jan-74
1647	The Long Winter: Part 8 - Christmas in May	Laura Ingalls Wilder	Eileen Atkins	30-Jan-74
1648	The Extraordinary Adventures of Bobby Brewster: A Funny Thing Happened	H. E. Todd		04-Feb-74
1649	The Extraordinary Adventures of Bobby Brewster: West with the Wagon	H. E. Todd		05-Feb-74
1650	Viewers' Stories: Past, Present and Future	Stories written by Children	Alex Marshall & Ray Brooks	06-Feb-74
1651	Viewers' Stories: People	Stories written by Children	Alex Marshall & Ray Brooks	07-Feb-74
1652	Viewers' Stories: Magic and Dreams	Stories written by Children	Alex Marshall & Ray Brooks	08-Feb-74
1653	Little Tim and the Brave Sea Captain	Edward Ardizzone	Willie Rushton	11-Feb-74
1654	Tim to the Rescue	Edward Ardizzone	Willie Rushton	12-Feb-74
1655	Tim and Ginger	Edward Ardizzone	Willie Rushton	13-Feb-74
1656	Tim and Charlotte	Edward Ardizzone	Willie Rushton	14-Feb-74
1657	Tim's Last Voyage	Edward Ardizzone	Willie Rushton	15-Feb-74
1658	The Horse Doctor and the Witch	Traditional Austrian tale	Keith Barron	18-Feb-74
1659	The Alphorn	Traditional Swiss tale	Keith Barron	19-Feb-74
1660	Janko's Debt	Traditional Serbian tale	Keith Barron	20-Feb-74
1661	The Joker of Brunswick	Traditional German tale	Keith Barron	21-Feb-74
1662	Stavoren	Traditional Dutch tale	Keith Barron	22-Feb-74
1663	Tiger Nanny: Part 1 - To be a Tiger Nanny	Ursula Moray Williams	Patricia Hayes	25-Feb-74
1664	Tiger Nanny: Part 2 - A Baby for Tiger Nanny	Ursula Moray Williams	Patricia Hayes	26-Feb-74
1665	Tiger Nanny: Part 3 - Hi-jacked!	Ursula Moray Williams	Patricia Hayes	27-Feb-74
1666	Tiger Nanny: Part 4 - Landfall	Ursula Moray Williams	Patricia Hayes	28-Feb-74
1667	Tiger Nanny: Part 5 - Queen of the Nursery	Ursula Moray Williams	Patricia Hayes	01-Mar-74
1668	Tristan and Isolde: Part 1 - Princess of the Swallow's Hair	Traditional tale	Martin Jarvis	04-Mar-74
1669	Tristan and Isolde: Part 2 - A Bride For King Marc	Traditional tale	Martin Jarvis	05-Mar-74
1670	Tristan and Isolde: Part 3 - The Hidden Valley	Traditional tale	Martin Jarvis	06-Mar-74
1671	Tristan and Isolde: Part 4 - Isolde's Laughter	Traditional tale	Martin Jarvis	07-Mar-74
1672	Tristan and Isolde: Part 5 - The White Sail	Traditional tale	Martin Jarvis	08-Mar-74
1673	The Bongleweed: Part 1 - Jason	Helen Cresswell	Barbara Mitchell	11-Mar-74
1674	The Bongleweed: Part 2 - Figment of Imagination	Helen Cresswell	Barbara Mitchell	12-Mar-74
1675	The Bongleweed: Part 3 - Growing Weather	Helen Cresswell	Barbara Mitchell	13-Mar-74
1676	The Bongleweed: Part 4 - Dragon's Teeth	Helen Cresswell	Barbara Mitchell	14-Mar-74
1677	The Bongleweed: Part 5 - Axes Sharpened	Helen Cresswell	Barbara Mitchell	15-Mar-74
1678	Littlenose the Fisherman: The Big Catch	John Grant		18-Mar-74
1679	Littlenose the Fisherman: Littlenose's Garden	John Grant		19-Mar-74
1680	Littlenose the Fisherman: Littlenose's Holiday	John Grant		20-Mar-74
1681	Littlenose the Fisherman: Urk	John Grant		21-Mar-74
1682	Littlenose the Fisherman: Littlenose Goes to Market	John Grant		22-Mar-74
1683	The Jungle Book: Mowgli's Brothers Part 1	Rudyard Kipling	Michael Hordern	25-Mar-74
1684	The Jungle Book: Mowgli's Brothers Part 2	Rudyard Kipling	Michael Hordern	26-Mar-74
1685	The Jungle Book: Tiger! Tiger! Part 1	Rudyard Kipling	Michael Hordern	27-Mar-74
1686	The Jungle Book: Tiger! Tiger! Part 2	Rudyard Kipling	Michael Hordern	28-Mar-74
1687	The Jungle Book: Rikki-Tikki-Tavi	Rudyard Kipling	Michael Hordern	29-Mar-74
1688	In Search of Unicorns: Part 1 - Spring and a Thinking Stone	Susannah York		01-Apr-74
1689	In Search of Unicorns: Part 2 - The Spring Rites	Susannah York		02-Apr-74
1690	In Search of Unicorns: Part 3 - A Mammoth Hunt	Susannah York		03-Apr-74
1691	In Search of Unicorns: Part 4 - The Search	Susannah York		04-Apr-74
1692	In Search of Unicorns: Part 5 - Finding	Susannah York		05-Apr-74
1693	Butch and Bax: Part 1 - Bax is Bored	Roger Collinson	Bernard Holley	08-Apr-74
1694	Butch and Bax: Part 2 - It Doesn't Grow on Trees	Roger Collinson	Bernard Holley	09-Apr-74
1695	Butch and Bax: Part 3 - Butch	Roger Collinson	Bernard Holley	10-Apr-74
1696	Butch and Bax: Part 4 - Lost	Roger Collinson	Bernard Holley	11-Apr-74
1697	Story from China: How the Sea became Salty	Aisha Akbar	Pik-Sen Lim	15-Apr-74
1698	The Bread Bin: Part 1 - Roller-skating	Joan Aiken	Bernard Cribbins	16-Apr-74
1699	The Bread Bin: Part 2 - A Bird in the Chimney	Joan Aiken	Bernard Cribbins	17-Apr-74
1700	The Bread Bin: Part 3 - Spaghetti	Joan Aiken	Bernard Cribbins	18-Apr-74
1701	The Bread Bin: Part 4 - The Rain Stops	Joan Aiken	Bernard Cribbins	19-Apr-74
1702	The Golden Touch: Part 1 - A Wish for Gold	Lynne Reid Banks	Michael Gough	22-Apr-74
1703	The Golden Touch: Part 2 - The Ash-Birds Know	Lynne Reid Banks	Michael Gough	23-Apr-74
1704	The Golden Touch: Part 3 - Old Gollop	Lynne Reid Banks	Michael Gough	24-Apr-74
1705	The Golden Touch: Part 4 - Witch Wuzzleflump	Lynne Reid Banks	Michael Gough	25-Apr-74
1706	The Golden Touch: Part 5 - A Mumbo Helps	Lynne Reid Banks	Michael Gough	26-Apr-74
1707	Poetry and Songs: Going Places	Elaine Delmar/Paul Jones		29-Apr-74
1708	The Adventures of Lester: Lester on his way to see Otto	Quentin Blake		30-Apr-74
1709	The Adventures of Lester: Lester and the Unusual Pet			01-May-74
1710	The Adventures of Lester: Lester at the Seaside			02-May-74
1711	Poetry and Songs: Animals	Elaine Delmar/Paul Jones		03-May-74
1712	The Boy from Sula: Part 1 - Away from Sula	Lavinia Derwent	John Cairney	06-May-74
1713	The Boy from Sula: Part 2 - Home on the Island	Lavinia Derwent	John Cairney	07-May-74
1714	The Boy from Sula: Part 3 - The Excursion	Lavinia Derwent	John Cairney	08-May-74
1715	The Boy from Sula: Part 4 - An Accident	Lavinia Derwent	John Cairney	09-May-74
1716	The Boy from Sula: Part 5 - The Cottage Hospital	Lavinia Derwent	John Cairney	10-May-74
1717	The Nine Lives of Island Mackenzie: Part 1 - The Island	Ursula Moray Williams	Phyllida Law	13-May-74
1718	The Nine Lives of Island Mackenzie: Part 2 - Go away, Cat!	Ursula Moray Williams	Phyllida Law	14-May-74
1719	The Nine Lives of Island Mackenzie: Part 3 - Danger from the Sea	Ursula Moray Williams	Phyllida Law	15-May-74
1720	The Nine Lives of Island Mackenzie: Part 4 - The Rescue	Ursula Moray Williams	Phyllida Law	16-May-74
1721	The Church Cat Abroad	Graham Oakley	Cyril Luckham	17-May-74
1722	The Sand Bird: Part 1 - The Bring-and-Buy Stall	Margaret J. Baker	Ann Morrish	20-May-74
1723	The Sand Bird: Part 2 - As Big as a Bus	Margaret J. Baker	Ann Morrish	21-May-74
1724	The Sand Bird: Part 3 - Trouble in the Supermarket	Margaret J. Baker	Ann Morrish	22-May-74
1725	The Sand Bird: Part 4 - As Brave as Lions	Margaret J. Baker	Ann Morrish	23-May-74
1726	The Sand Bird: Part 5 - Feathers of Sand	Margaret J. Baker	Ann Morrish	24-May-74
1727	What the Neighbours Did and other stories: In The Middle of the Night	Philippa Pearce	Judi Dench	28-May-74
1728	What the Neighbours Did and other stories: The Tree in the Meadow	Philippa Pearce	Judi Dench	29-May-74
1729	What the Neighbours Did and other stories: Still Jim and Silent Jim Part 1	Philippa Pearce	Judi Dench	30-May-74
1730	What the Neighbours Did and other stories: Still Jim and Silent Jim Part 2	Philippa Pearce	Judi Dench	31-May-74
1731	The Queen of Trent: Part 1 - A Way of Escape	Mitchell Dawson	Robert Keegan	03-Jun-74
1732	The Queen of Trent: Part 2 - Stowaways	Mitchell Dawson	Robert Keegan	04-Jun-74
1733	The Queen of Trent: Part 3 - Embarkation	Mitchell Dawson	Robert Keegan	05-Jun-74
1734	The Queen of Trent: Part 4 - Neptune	Mitchell Dawson	Robert Keegan	06-Jun-74
1735	The Queen of Trent: Part 5 - The Eagre	Mitchell Dawson	Robert Keegan	07-Jun-74
1736	Voytek the Soldier Bear: Part 1	Geoffrey Morgan & Wieslaw A. Lasocki	Harry Towb	10-Jun-74
1737	Voytek the Soldier Bear: Part 2	Geoffrey Morgan & Wieslaw A. Lasocki	Harry Towb	11-Jun-74
1738	Voytek the Soldier Bear: Part 3	Geoffrey Morgan & Wieslaw A. Lasocki	Harry Towb	12-Jun-74
1739	To Bhutan	Peter Steele		13-Jun-74
1740	To South America	Peter Steele		14-Jun-74
1741	The Island of Adventure: Part 1 - A Glimpse of the Isle of Gloom	Enid Blyton	Peter Gilmore	30-Sep-74
1742	The Island of Adventure: Part 2 - A Secret Passage	Enid Blyton	Peter Gilmore	01-Oct-74
1743	The Island of Adventure: Part 3 - Strange Discoveries	Enid Blyton	Peter Gilmore	02-Oct-74
1744	The Island of Adventure: Part 4 - Lost in the Mines	Enid Blyton	Peter Gilmore	03-Oct-74
1745	The Island of Adventure: Part 5 - A Journey under the Sea	Enid Blyton	Peter Gilmore	04-Oct-74
1746	The Travels of Oggy: Oggy Sets Out	Ann Lawrence	Brian Peck	07-Oct-74
1747	The Travels of Oggy: The Cat and the Rat	Ann Lawrence	Brian Peck	08-Oct-74
1748	The Travels of Oggy: Oggy Learns to Swim	Ann Lawrence	Brian Peck	09-Oct-74
1749	The Travels of Oggy: About Bad Ends	Ann Lawrence	Brian Peck	10-Oct-74
1750	The Travels of Oggy: The Whole World	Ann Lawrence	Brian Peck	11-Oct-74
1751	Warrior Scarlet: Part 1 - Tarole the Hunter	Rosemary Sutcliff	Michael Jayston	14-Oct-74
1752	Warrior Scarlet: Part 2 - Whitethroat the Puppy	Rosemary Sutcliff	Michael Jayston	15-Oct-74
1753	Warrior Scarlet: Part 3 - The Boys' House	Rosemary Sutcliff	Michael Jayston	16-Oct-74
1754	Warrior Scarlet: Part 4 - The Wolf Hunt	Rosemary Sutcliff	Michael Jayston	17-Oct-74
1755	Warrior Scarlet: Part 5 - Scarlet on the Loom	Rosemary Sutcliff	Michael Jayston	18-Oct-74
1756	The Blue Baba of the Marsh	Pavel Bazhov	Jane Asher	21-Oct-74
1757	Three Apples Fell from Heaven: The Fiery Horse	Mischa Kudian	Jane Asher	22-Oct-74
1758	The Maid of the Copper Mountain	Pavel Bazhov	Jane Asher	23-Oct-74
1759	Three Apples Fell from Heaven: Brave Nazar	Mischa Kudian	Jane Asher	24-Oct-74
1760	The Stone Flower	Pavel Bazhov	Jane Asher	25-Oct-74
1761	The Pushcart War: Part 1 - The Daffodil Massacre	Jean Merrill	Al Mancini	28-Oct-74
1762	The Pushcart War: Part 2 - The Pea Shooter Campaign	Jean Merrill	Al Mancini	29-Oct-74
1763	The Pushcart War: Part 3 - A Tacks Tax and a Pea Blockade	Jean Merrill	Al Mancini	30-Oct-74
1764	The Pushcart War: Part 4 - The Peace March	Jean Merrill	Al Mancini	31-Oct-74
1765	The Pushcart War: Part 5 - Victory	Jean Merrill	Al Mancini	01-Nov-74
1766	Worzel Gummidge Again: Scatterbrook Scarecrows	Barbara Euphan Todd	Geoffrey Bayldon	04-Nov-74
1767	Worzel Gummidge Again: The Caretaker	Barbara Euphan Todd	Geoffrey Bayldon	05-Nov-74
1768	Worzel Gummidge Again: Guy and Gummidge	Barbara Euphan Todd	Geoffrey Bayldon	06-Nov-74
1769	Worzel Gummidge Again: Tapioca Pudding	Barbara Euphan Todd	Geoffrey Bayldon	07-Nov-74
1770	Worzel Gummidge Again: The Christmas Party	Barbara Euphan Todd	Geoffrey Bayldon	08-Nov-74
1771	The Moon on the Water: Part 1 - The Gypsy's Secret	Nina Warner Hooke	Ronald Pickup	11-Nov-74
1772	The Moon on the Water: Part 2 - A Terrible Trap	Nina Warner Hooke	Ronald Pickup	12-Nov-74
1773	The Moon on the Water: Part 3 - Carla and Carlo	Nina Warner Hooke	Ronald Pickup	13-Nov-74
1774	The Moon on the Water: Part 4 - Fernanda's story	Nina Warner Hooke	Ronald Pickup	14-Nov-74
1775	The Moon on the Water: Part 5 - Journey's End	Nina Warner Hooke	Ronald Pickup	15-Nov-74
1776	Comet in Moominland: Part 1 - Stars with Tails	Tove Jansson	Keith Barron	18-Nov-74
1777	Comet in Moominland: Part 2 - The Lonely Mountains	Tove Jansson	Keith Barron	19-Nov-74
1778	Comet in Moominland: Part 3 - Homeward Bound	Tove Jansson	Keith Barron	20-Nov-74
1779	Comet in Moominland: Part 4 - The Tornado	Tove Jansson	Keith Barron	21-Nov-74
1780	Comet in Moominland: Part 5 - The Seventh of October	Tove Jansson	Keith Barron	22-Nov-74
1781	A Wizard of Earthsea: Part 1	Ursula K. Le Guin	Edward Fox	25-Nov-74
1782	A Wizard of Earthsea: Part 2	Ursula K. Le Guin	Edward Fox	26-Nov-74
1783	A Wizard of Earthsea: Part 3	Ursula K. Le Guin	Edward Fox	27-Nov-74
1784	A Wizard of Earthsea: Part 4	Ursula K. Le Guin	Edward Fox	28-Nov-74
1785	A Wizard of Earthsea: Part 5	Ursula K. Le Guin	Edward Fox	29-Nov-74
1786	The Ogre Downstairs: Part 1 - The Chemistry Sets	Diana Wynne Jones	Margaret Tyzack	02-Dec-74
1787	The Ogre Downstairs: Part 2 - Flying and Changing	Diana Wynne Jones	Margaret Tyzack	03-Dec-74
1788	The Ogre Downstairs: Part 3 - Living Toffee	Diana Wynne Jones	Margaret Tyzack	04-Dec-74
1789	The Ogre Downstairs: Part 4 - Invisibility at Last	Diana Wynne Jones	Margaret Tyzack	05-Dec-74
1790	The Ogre Downstairs: Part 5 - Gold	Diana Wynne Jones	Margaret Tyzack	06-Dec-74
1791	The Callow Pit Coffer	Kevin Crossley-Holland	Denholm Elliott	09-Dec-74
1792	Norwegian Troll Stories: The Oak Mountain Troll	Philip Newth	Jon Pertwee	16-Dec-74
1793	Norwegian Troll Stories: The Nissen	Philip Newth	Jon Pertwee	17-Dec-74
1794	Norwegian Troll Stories: The Hulder Folk	Philip Newth	Jon Pertwee	18-Dec-74
1795	Norwegian Troll Stories: The Grimen	Philip Newth	Jon Pertwee	19-Dec-74
1796	Norwegian Troll Stories: The Terrible Troll Brats	Philip Newth	Jon Pertwee	20-Dec-74
1797	Treacle Terrace	Pearl Binder	Julian Orchard	23-Dec-74
1798	The Studio Ghost	Willie Rushton		30-Dec-74
1799	Father Time: 1975 is Missing	Willie Rushton		31-Dec-74

== 1975 ==
Episode	Story	Written by	Read by	Original air date
1800	A Game of Catch: Echoes	Helen Cresswell	Ian Ogilvy	02-Jan-75
1801	A Game of Catch: The Real Game of Catch	Helen Cresswell	Ian Ogilvy	03-Jan-75
1802	The Rose and the Ring: Part 1 - The Fairy Blackstick	William Makepeace Thackeray	Kenneth Williams	06-Jan-75
1803	The Rose and the Ring: Part 2 - Prince Bulbo Comes to Court	William Makepeace Thackeray	Kenneth Williams	07-Jan-75
1804	The Rose and the Ring: Part 3 - Queen Rosalba and the Bold Count Hogginarmo	William Makepeace Thackeray	Kenneth Williams	08-Jan-75
1805	The Rose and the Ring: Part 4 - Most Important News	William Makepeace Thackeray	Kenneth Williams	09-Jan-75
1806	The Rose and the Ring: Part 5 - Gruffy's Husband, Won and Lost	William Makepeace Thackeray	Kenneth Williams	10-Jan-75
1807	Poor Cecco: How Poor Cecco Lost his Tail	Margery Williams Bianco	Ted Ray	13-Jan-75
1808	Poor Cecco: Bulka and Poor Cecco Decide to See the World	Margery Williams Bianco	Ted Ray	14-Jan-75
1809	Poor Cecco: The Pursuit	Margery Williams Bianco	Ted Ray	15-Jan-75
1810	Poor Cecco: Murrum's Revenge	Margery Williams Bianco	Ted Ray	16-Jan-75
1811	Poor Cecco: The Rescue	Margery Williams Bianco	Ted Ray	17-Jan-75
1812	A Cow Called Boy: Part 1 - Josh's School Project	Cyril Everard Palmer	Kenneth Gardnier	20-Jan-75
1813	A Cow Called Boy: Part 2 - A Cow in the School	Cyril Everard Palmer	Kenneth Gardnier	21-Jan-75
1814	A Cow Called Boy: Part 3 - Cow for Sale	Cyril Everard Palmer	Kenneth Gardnier	22-Jan-75
1815	A Cow Called Boy: Part 4 - Unfair to Josh	Cyril Everard Palmer	Kenneth Gardnier	23-Jan-75
1816	A Cow Called Boy: Part 5 - Reunited	Cyril Everard Palmer	Kenneth Gardnier	24-Jan-75
1817	Stories from Scotland: The Boy who could Talk to the Birds	Jenny Nimmo	Wendy Wood	27-Jan-75
1818	Stories from Scotland: The Mean Farmer	Jenny Nimmo	Wendy Wood	28-Jan-75
1819	Stories from Scotland: Prince Meilochon and the Giant's Daughter	Jenny Nimmo	Wendy Wood	29-Jan-75
1820	Stories from Scotland: Silver and Storm	Jenny Nimmo	Wendy Wood	30-Jan-75
1821	Stories from Scotland: Muriella of Cawdor	Jenny Nimmo	Wendy Wood	31-Jan-75
1822	The Hawkstone: Part 1 - On Thunderhead	Jay Williams	Ed Bishop	10-Feb-75
1823	The Hawkstone: Part 2 - Becoming Other People	Jay Williams	Ed Bishop	11-Feb-75
1824	The Hawkstone: Part 3 - The Archery Range	Jay Williams	Ed Bishop	12-Feb-75
1825	The Hawkstone: Part 4 - Voices in the Head	Jay Williams	Ed Bishop	13-Feb-75
1826	The Hawkstone: Part 5 - Colin's Swap	Jay Williams	Ed Bishop	14-Feb-75
1827	Winnie-the-Pooh and The House at Pooh Corner: Christopher Robin leads an Expotition to the North Pole	A. A. Milne	Willie Rushton	17-Feb-75
1828	Winnie-the-Pooh and The House at Pooh Corner: Eeyore has a Birthday, and gets Two Presents	A. A. Milne	Willie Rushton	18-Feb-75
1829	Winnie-the-Pooh and The House at Pooh Corner: Piglet is Entirely Surrounded by Water	A. A. Milne	Willie Rushton	19-Feb-75
1830	Winnie-the-Pooh and The House at Pooh Corner: Tigger comes to the Forest and has Breakfast	A. A. Milne	Willie Rushton	20-Feb-75
1831	Winnie-the-Pooh and The House at Pooh Corner: Piglet does a Very Grand Thing and Eeyore finds a Wolery	A. A. Milne	Willie Rushton	21-Feb-75
1832	The Light Princess: Part 1 - She Can't be Ours	George MacDonald	John Laurie	24-Feb-75
1833	The Light Princess: Part 2 - Try a Drop of Water	George MacDonald	John Laurie	25-Feb-75
1834	The Light Princess: Part 3 - Look at the Rain	George MacDonald	John Laurie	26-Feb-75
1835	The Golden Key: Part 1 - Mossy and Tangle	George MacDonald	John Laurie	27-Feb-75
1836	The Golden Key: Part 2 - The Old Man of the Sea	George MacDonald	John Laurie	28-Feb-75
1837	Red Fox: Part 1 - The Lessons of the Wild	Charles G. D. Roberts	Robert Lang	03-Mar-75
1838	Red Fox: Part 2 - The Foiling of the Traps	Charles G. D. Roberts	Robert Lang	04-Mar-75
1839	Red Fox: Part 3 - The Fooling of the Mongrels	Charles G. D. Roberts	Robert Lang	05-Mar-75
1840	Red Fox: Part 4 - The Red Scourge of the Forest	Charles G. D. Roberts	Robert Lang	06-Mar-75
1841	Red Fox: Part 5 - In the Hands of the Enemy	Charles G. D. Roberts	Robert Lang	07-Mar-75
1842	The Frog Princess	Traditional Russian Tale	Tatyana Feifer	10-Mar-75
1843	Go Somewhere, I Don't Know Where	Traditional Russian Tale	Tatyana Feifer	11-Mar-75
1844	The Samosek Sword	Traditional Russian Tale	Tatyana Feifer	12-Mar-75
1845	The Magic Roan	Traditional Russian Tale	Tatyana Feifer	13-Mar-75
1846	The Firebird	Traditional Russian Tale	Tatyana Feifer	14-Mar-75
1847	Snatched: Part 1 - Kidnapped	Richard Parker	Dinsdale Landen	17-Mar-75
1848	Snatched: Part 2 - Trapped	Richard Parker	Dinsdale Landen	18-Mar-75
1849	Snatched: Part 3 - Plan of escape	Richard Parker	Dinsdale Landen	19-Mar-75
1850	Snatched: Part 4 - The Man in Black	Richard Parker	Dinsdale Landen	20-Mar-75
1851	Snatched: Part 5 - Joseph Elias	Richard Parker	Dinsdale Landen	21-Mar-75
1852	Priscilla Pentecost: Part 1 - Mr. Gale	Barbara Willard	Gwen Watford	24-Mar-75
1853	Priscilla Pentecost: Part 2 - The Manor House People	Barbara Willard	Gwen Watford	25-Mar-75
1854	Priscilla Pentecost: Part 3 - Hannah	Barbara Willard	Gwen Watford	26-Mar-75
1855	Priscilla Pentecost: Part 4 - The Hunt	Barbara Willard	Gwen Watford	27-Mar-75
1856	A Collector of Animals	Gerald Durrell		01-Apr-75
1857	Journeys to Africa	Gerald Durrell		02-Apr-75
1858	Australia, New Zealand, and Malaysia	Gerald Durrell		03-Apr-75
1859	Menagerie Manor	Gerald Durrell		04-Apr-75
1860	The Impecunious Hero: The Troll Maiden	Charles Phillips	Hugh Lloyd	07-Apr-75
1861	The Impecunious Hero: The Princess with the Long Hair	Charles Phillips	Hugh Lloyd	08-Apr-75
1862	The Impecunious Hero: The Black Jackanapes	Charles Phillips	Hugh Lloyd	09-Apr-75
1863	The Impecunious Hero: The Wolf and the Witch	Charles Phillips	Hugh Lloyd	10-Apr-75
1864	The Impecunious Hero: The Wicked Wizard of Wubbledu	Charles Phillips	Hugh Lloyd	11-Apr-75
1865	Come Down the Mountain: Part 1 - The Horse on the Moors	Vian Smith	Judi Dench	14-Apr-75
1866	Come Down the Mountain: Part 2 - Nothing We Can Do	Vian Smith	Judi Dench	15-Apr-75
1867	Come Down the Mountain: Part 3 - The Fifth Form's Party	Vian Smith	Judi Dench	16-Apr-75
1868	Come Down the Mountain: Part 4 - Brian Lends a Hand	Vian Smith	Judi Dench	17-Apr-75
1869	Come Down the Mountain: Part 5 - Mr Stephen Bassett	Vian Smith	Judi Dench	18-Apr-75
1870	The Wild Swans	Hans Christian Andersen	Andrew Ray	21-Apr-75
1871	The Magic Galoshes	Hans Christian Andersen	Andrew Ray	22-Apr-75
1872	The Ice Maiden	Hans Christian Andersen	Andrew Ray	23-Apr-75
1873	The Shadow	Hans Christian Andersen	Andrew Ray	24-Apr-75
1874	The Ugly Duckling	Hans Christian Andersen	Andrew Ray	25-Apr-75
1875	In a Blue Velvet Dress: Part 1 - A Bookworm...with no Books	Catherine Sefton	Kate Binchy	28-Apr-75
1876	In a Blue Velvet Dress: Part 2 - The Mystery of the Victorian Books	Catherine Sefton	Kate Binchy	29-Apr-75
1877	In a Blue Velvet Dress: Part 3 - The Lavender Garden	Catherine Sefton	Kate Binchy	30-Apr-75
1878	In a Blue Velvet Dress: Part 4 - Mary...	Catherine Sefton	Kate Binchy	01-May-75
1879	In a Blue Velvet Dress: Part 5 - The Dark Stormy Sea	Catherine Sefton	Kate Binchy	02-May-75
1880	Cockleburr Quarters: Part 1 - The Puppies	Charlotte Baker	Earl Cameron	05-May-75
1881	Cockleburr Quarters: Part 2 - Night Flight	Charlotte Baker	Earl Cameron	06-May-75
1882	Cockleburr Quarters: Part 3 - Gone	Charlotte Baker	Earl Cameron	07-May-75
1883	Cockleburr Quarters: Part 4 - War on Worms	Charlotte Baker	Earl Cameron	08-May-75
1884	Cockleburr Quarters: Part 5 - Ghost Town	Charlotte Baker	Earl Cameron	09-May-75
1885	The Bronze Trumpeter: Part 1 - The Fountain	Jenny Nimmo	Jan Francis	12-May-75
1886	The Bronze Trumpeter: Part 2 - The Theatre	Jenny Nimmo	Jan Francis	13-May-75
1887	The Bronze Trumpeter: Part 3 - The Comedians	Jenny Nimmo	Jan Francis	14-May-75
1888	The Bronze Trumpeter: Part 4 - The Mountain	Jenny Nimmo	Jan Francis	15-May-75
1889	The Bronze Trumpeter: Part 5 - The Play	Jenny Nimmo	Jan Francis	16-May-75
1890	Charlie and the Great Glass Elevator: Part 1 - Mr Wonka goes Too Far	Roald Dahl	Elaine Stritch	19-May-75
1891	Charlie and the Great Glass Elevator: Part 2 - Men from Mars	Roald Dahl	Elaine Stritch	20-May-75
1892	Charlie and the Great Glass Elevator: Part 3 - The Vermicious Knids	Roald Dahl	Elaine Stritch	21-May-75
1893	Charlie and the Great Glass Elevator: Part 4 - Back to the Chocolate Factory	Roald Dahl	Elaine Stritch	22-May-75
1894	Charlie and the Great Glass Elevator: Part 5 - How to Get Someone Out of Bed	Roald Dahl	Elaine Stritch	23-May-75
1895	Babar the Elephant: The Story of Babar/Babar's Travels	Jean de Brunhoff	Maurice Roëves	27-May-75
1896	Babar the Elephant: Babar the King/Babar at Home	Jean de Brunhoff	Maurice Roëves	28-May-75
1897	Babar the Elephant: Babar's Birthday Surprise/Babar's Fair	Jean de Brunhoff	Maurice Roëves	29-May-75
1898	Babar the Elephant: Babar and that Rascal Arthur/Babar's Castle	Jean de Brunhoff	Maurice Roëves	30-May-75
1899	Fatter Tom and the Water Boy: Part 1 - From out of the Sea	Maurice Duggan	Michael Gough	02-Jun-75
1900	Fatter Tom and the Water Boy: Part 2 - The Cave of Voices	Maurice Duggan	Michael Gough	03-Jun-75
1901	The Kingdom Under the Sea, and other stories: The Kingdom Under the Sea	Joan Aiken	Michael Gough	04-Jun-75
1902	The Kingdom Under the Sea, and other stories: The Sun-God's Castle	Joan Aiken	Michael Gough	05-Jun-75
1903	The Kingdom Under the Sea, and other stories: The King who declared war on the Animals	Joan Aiken	Michael Gough	06-Jun-75
1904	Littlenose to the Rescue: Littlenose's Rhinoceros	John Grant		08-Sep-75
1905	Littlenose to the Rescue: Bigfoot	John Grant		09-Sep-75
1906	Littlenose to the Rescue:	John Grant		10-Sep-75
1907	Littlenose to the Rescue: Littlenose the Magician	John Grant		11-Sep-75
1908	Littlenose to the Rescue: Littlenose the Bee Keeper	John Grant		12-Sep-75
1909	The Ormering Tide: Part 1 - Maria	Roger Pilkington	Jack Hedley	15-Sep-75
1910	The Ormering Tide: Part 2 - The Missing Ships	Roger Pilkington	Jack Hedley	16-Sep-75
1911	The Ormering Tide: Part 3 - Antoine	Roger Pilkington	Jack Hedley	17-Sep-75
1912	The Ormering Tide: Part 4 - The Storm	Roger Pilkington	Jack Hedley	18-Sep-75
1913	The Ormering Tide: Part 5 - The Great Tide	Roger Pilkington	Jack Hedley	19-Sep-75
1914	Ludo and the Star Horse: Part 1 - The Lost Horse	Mary Stewart	Edward Petherbridge	22-Sep-75
1915	Ludo and the Star Horse: Part 2 - The Archer, the Goat and Gula	Mary Stewart	Edward Petherbridge	23-Sep-75
1916	Ludo and the Star Horse: Part 3 - The Fish, the Ram and the Bull	Mary Stewart	Edward Petherbridge	24-Sep-75
1917	Ludo and the Star Horse: Part 4 - The Twins, the Crab, the Lady and the Lion	Mary Stewart	Edward Petherbridge	25-Sep-75
1918	Ludo and the Star Horse: Part 5 - The Scales and the Scorpion	Mary Stewart	Edward Petherbridge	26-Sep-75
1919	The Adventures of Lester: Lester and the Assorted Seeds	Quentin Blake		06-Oct-75
1920	The Adventures of Lester: Lester and the Underground Treasure	Quentin Blake		07-Oct-75
1921	The Adventures of Lester: Lester and the Beautiful Fairy	Quentin Blake		08-Oct-75
1922	The Church Mouse	Graham Oakley	Cyril Luckham	09-Oct-75
1923	A Stranger at Green Knowe: Part 1 - Capture	Lucy M. Boston	Ronald Pickup	13-Oct-75
1924	A Stranger at Green Knowe: Part 2 - The Monkey House	Lucy M. Boston	Ronald Pickup	14-Oct-75
1925	A Stranger at Green Knowe: Part 3 - Toseland Thicket	Lucy M. Boston	Ronald Pickup	15-Oct-75
1926	A Stranger at Green Knowe: Part 4 - Ping - The Little Gorilla	Lucy M. Boston	Ronald Pickup	16-Oct-75
1927	A Stranger at Green Knowe: Part 5 - The Hunt	Lucy M. Boston	Ronald Pickup	17-Oct-75
1928	Jane's Adventures in a Balloon: Part 1 - The Airship	Jonathan Gathorne-Hardy	Penelope Keith	20-Oct-75
1929	Jane's Adventures in a Balloon: Part 2 - The Avalanche	Jonathan Gathorne-Hardy	Penelope Keith	21-Oct-75
1930	Jane's Adventures in a Balloon: Part 3 - The Mountains of the Moon	Jonathan Gathorne-Hardy	Penelope Keith	22-Oct-75
1931	Jane's Adventures in a Balloon: Part 4 - Call Me Mub	Jonathan Gathorne-Hardy	Penelope Keith	23-Oct-75
1932	Jane's Adventures in a Balloon: Part 5 - Mrs Deal's Finest Hour	Jonathan Gathorne-Hardy	Penelope Keith	24-Oct-75
1933	The Twilight of Magic: Part 1 - Shragga the Witch	Hugh Lofting	Siân Phillips	27-Oct-75
1934	The Twilight of Magic: Part 2 - The Whispering Shell	Hugh Lofting	Siân Phillips	28-Oct-75
1935	The Twilight of Magic: Part 3 - The King's Finder	Hugh Lofting	Siân Phillips	29-Oct-75
1936	The Twilight of Magic: Part 4 - The Great Quest	Hugh Lofting	Siân Phillips	30-Oct-75
1937	The Twilight of Magic: Part 5 - The King Pays a Debt	Hugh Lofting	Siân Phillips	31-Oct-75
1938	Mrs Pepperpot's Year: Mrs Pepperpot's Winter	Alf Prøysen	Thora Hird	03-Nov-75
1939	Mrs Pepperpot's Year: Mrs Pepperpot's Spring	Alf Prøysen	Thora Hird	04-Nov-75
1940	Mrs Pepperpot's Year: Mrs Pepperpot's Summer	Alf Prøysen	Thora Hird	05-Nov-75
1941	Mrs Pepperpot's Year: Mrs Pepperpot's Autumn	Alf Prøysen	Thora Hird	06-Nov-75
1942	Mrs Pepperpot's Year: Mrs Pepperpot's Christmas	Alf Prøysen	Thora Hird	07-Nov-75
1943	The Hare at Dark Hollow: Part 1 - Kee's Family	Joyce Stranger	Martin Jarvis	10-Nov-75
1944	The Hare at Dark Hollow: Part 2 - Changes	Joyce Stranger	Martin Jarvis	11-Nov-75
1945	The Hare at Dark Hollow: Part 3 - Newcomers	Joyce Stranger	Martin Jarvis	12-Nov-75
1946	The Hare at Dark Hollow: Part 4 - A New Spring	Joyce Stranger	Martin Jarvis	13-Nov-75
1947	The Peregrine	Joyce Stranger	Martin Jarvis	14-Nov-75
1948	The Boy and The Monkey: Part 1 - Lady Margaret's ring	Leon Garfield	Freddie Jones	17-Nov-75
1949	The Boy and The Monkey: Part 2 - Lord Coke's Painful Duty	Leon Garfield	Freddie Jones	18-Nov-75
1950	The Boy and The Monkey: Part 3 - The Captain's Watch	Leon Garfield	Freddie Jones	19-Nov-75
1951	The Boy and The Monkey: Part 4 - Lucifer Wilkins	Leon Garfield	Freddie Jones	20-Nov-75
1952	The Boy and The Monkey: Part 5 - What Price Freedom?	Leon Garfield	Freddie Jones	21-Nov-75
1953	The Eighteenth Emergency: Part 1 - Neanderthal Man	Betsy Byars	Bob Sherman	24-Nov-75
1954	The Eighteenth Emergency: Part 2 - Alive and Well by a Miracle	Betsy Byars	Bob Sherman	25-Nov-75
1955	The Eighteenth Emergency: Part 3 - The Waiting Game	Betsy Byars	Bob Sherman	26-Nov-75
1956	The Eighteenth Emergency: Part 4 - Garbage Dog	Betsy Byars	Bob Sherman	27-Nov-75
1957	The Eighteenth Emergency: Part 5 - A Matter of Honour	Betsy Byars	Bob Sherman	28-Nov-75
1958	Little Gertie at Granny's: Part 1 - Granny's Bonfire	Elsie Starks	Vivian Pickles	01-Dec-75
1959	Little Gertie at Granny's: Part 2 - Hokey Pokey Street	Elsie Starks	Vivian Pickles	02-Dec-75
1960	Little Gertie at Granny's: Part 3 - When Granny Papered the Walls	Elsie Starks	Vivian Pickles	03-Dec-75
1961	Little Gertie at Granny's: Part 4 - Oh, What a Windy Day!	Elsie Starks	Vivian Pickles	04-Dec-75
1962	Little Gertie at Granny's: Part 5 - Granny's Fire Brigade	Elsie Starks	Vivian Pickles	05-Dec-75
1963	Tenth Birthday Special: Writing Competition Winners	Stories & Poems by Children	Kenneth Williams/John Cairney/Kate Binchy	08-Dec-75
1964	Tenth Birthday Special: Writing Competition Winners	Stories & Poems by Children	Kenneth Williams/John Cairney/Kate Binchy	09-Dec-75
1965	Tenth Birthday Special: Writing Competition Winners	Stories & Poems by Children	Kenneth Williams/John Cairney/Kate Binchy	10-Dec-75
1966	Tenth Birthday Special: Writing Competition Winners	Stories & Poems by Children	Kenneth Williams/John Cairney/Kate Binchy	11-Dec-75
1967	Tenth Birthday Special: Writing Competition Winners	Stories & Poems by Children	Kenneth Williams/John Cairney/Kate Binchy	12-Dec-75
1968	The Sword from the Lake: Part 1 - Morgan	Marilyn Fox	Michael Bryant	15-Dec-75
1969	The Sword from the Lake: Part 2 - Merlin	Marilyn Fox	Michael Bryant	16-Dec-75
1970	The Sword from the Lake: Part 3 - Guinevere	Marilyn Fox	Michael Bryant	17-Dec-75
1971	The Sword from the Lake: Part 4 - Mordred	Marilyn Fox	Michael Bryant	18-Dec-75
1972	The Sword from the Lake: Part 5 - Avalon	Marilyn Fox	Michael Bryant	19-Dec-75
1973	The Geranium of Flüt: Part 1 - The Royal Visit to Flüt	Willie Rushton		29-Dec-75
1974	The Geranium of Flüt: Part 2 - Long Live our Noble Flüt	Willie Rushton		31-Dec-75

== 1976 ==
Episode	Story	Written by	Read by	Original air date
1975	The Geranium of Flüt: Part 3 - Flüt v England	01-Jan-76		
1976	The Geranium of Flüt: Part 4 - The Geranium talks to the Animals	02-Jan-76		
1977	Are All The Giants Dead?: Part 1 - The Arrival of Mildred	Mary Norton	Dorothy Tutin	05-Jan-76
1978	Are All The Giants Dead?: Part 2 - Through the Postern Gate	Mary Norton	Dorothy Tutin	06-Jan-76
1979	Are All The Giants Dead?: Part 3	Mary Norton	Dorothy Tutin	07-Jan-76
1980	The Magic Fishbone	Charles Dickens	Dorothy Tutin	08-Jan-76
1981	The Emperor's Oblong Pancake	Peter Hughes	Arthur Lowe	09-Jan-76
1982	We Couldn't Leave Dinah: Part 1 - The Nazis are Coming	Mary Treadgold	Caroline Mortimer	12-Jan-76
1983	We Couldn't Leave Dinah: Part 2 - The Last Boat	Mary Treadgold	Caroline Mortimer	13-Jan-76
1984	We Couldn't Leave Dinah: Part 3 - Peter Explains	Mary Treadgold	Caroline Mortimer	14-Jan-76
1985	We Couldn't Leave Dinah: Part 4 - Petit-Jean Returns Home	Mary Treadgold	Caroline Mortimer	15-Jan-76
1986	We Couldn't Leave Dinah: Part 5 - Nannerl to the Rescue	Mary Treadgold	Caroline Mortimer	16-Jan-76
1987	Zadig: Part 1 - Zadig the Nobleman	Voltaire	Jeremy Brett	19-Jan-76
1988	Zadig: Part 2 - Zadig the Detective	Voltaire	Jeremy Brett	20-Jan-76
1989	Zadig: Part 3 - Zadig the Grand Vizier	Voltaire	Jeremy Brett	21-Jan-76
1990	Zadig: Part 4 - Zadig the Slave	Voltaire	Jeremy Brett	22-Jan-76
1991	Zadig: Part 5 - Zadig the King	Voltaire	Jeremy Brett	23-Jan-76
1992	Five Children and It: Part 1 - The Sand Fairy	E. Nesbit	Judy Parfitt	26-Jan-76
1993	Five Children and It: Part 2 - Golden Guineas	E. Nesbit	Judy Parfitt	27-Jan-76
1994	Five Children and It: Part 3 - Wings	E. Nesbit	Judy Parfitt	28-Jan-76
1995	Five Children and It: Part 4 - Bigger than the Baker's Boy	E. Nesbit	Judy Parfitt	29-Jan-76
1996	Five Children and It: Part 5 - Let Go or I'll Bite	E. Nesbit	Judy Parfitt	30-Jan-76
1997	John of Badsaddle	Martin Booth	David Garfield	02-Feb-76
1998	Mary Mad	Martin Booth	David Garfield	03-Feb-76
1999	King of the Golden River: Part 1 - South West Wind Esquire	John Ruskin	David Garfield	04-Feb-76
2000	King of the Golden River: Part 2 - The Black Brothers	John Ruskin	David Garfield	05-Feb-76
2001	King of the Golden River: Part 3 - The Golden River	John Ruskin	David Garfield	06-Feb-76
2002	Star Dog: Part 1 - The Sighting	A. M. Lightner	Blain Fairman	09-Feb-76
2003	Star Dog: Part 2 - Mitzie's Pup	A. M. Lightner	Blain Fairman	10-Feb-76
2004	Star Dog: Part 3 - Dog in Demand	A. M. Lightner	Blain Fairman	11-Feb-76
2005	Star Dog: Part 4 - Dog Nappers	A. M. Lightner	Blain Fairman	12-Feb-76
2006	Star Dog: Part 5 - The Ship	A. M. Lightner	Blain Fairman	13-Feb-76
2007	Tales from Lapland: Draugen and his Red Cap	Philip Newth	Gareth Thomas	16-Feb-76
2008	Tales from Lapland: The Poor Boy who Looked for Work and Found Riches	Philip Newth	Gareth Thomas	17-Feb-76
2009	Tales from Lapland: Stallo and his Servant	Philip Newth	Gareth Thomas	18-Feb-76
2010	Tales from Lapland: Aslak and the Mermaid	Philip Newth	Gareth Thomas	19-Feb-76
2011	Tales from Lapland: The Family Strong	Philip Newth	Gareth Thomas	20-Feb-76
2012	More of a Person Really: Part 1 - Dougal	Dave King		01-Mar-76
2013	More of a Person Really: Part 2 - Debut	Dave King		02-Mar-76
2014	More of a Person Really: Part 3 - Pantomime	Dave King		03-Mar-76
2015	More of a Person Really: Part 4 - Television	Dave King		04-Mar-76
2016	More of a Person Really: Part 5 - Battersea	Dave King		05-Mar-76
2017	The Warden's Niece: Part 1 - Maria	Gillian Avery	Jan Francis	08-Mar-76
2018	The Warden's Niece: Part 2 - An Unknown Boy	Gillian Avery	Jan Francis	09-Mar-76
2019	The Warden's Niece: Part 3 - Truth or Dare	Gillian Avery	Jan Francis	10-Mar-76
2020	The Warden's Niece: Part 4 - Bodley and the Bull	Gillian Avery	Jan Francis	11-Mar-76
2021	The Warden's Niece: Part 5 - An Epitath	Gillian Avery	Jan Francis	12-Mar-76
2022	The Golden Fleece: Part 1 - Jason	Ancient Greek mythology	Martin Jarvis	15-Mar-76
2023	The Golden Fleece: Part 2 - The Argonauts	Ancient Greek mythology	Martin Jarvis	16-Mar-76
2024	The Golden Fleece: Part 3 - The Symplegades	Ancient Greek mythology	Martin Jarvis	17-Mar-76
2025	The Golden Fleece: Part 4 - Medea	Ancient Greek mythology	Martin Jarvis	18-Mar-76
2026	The Golden Fleece: Part 5 - The Argo	Ancient Greek mythology	Martin Jarvis	19-Mar-76
2027	Pussy Owl, Superbeast: Pussy Owl's Adventure	Brigid Brophy	James Cossins	22-Mar-76
2028	Pussy Owl, Superbeast: The Camptosaurus's Challenge	Brigid Brophy	James Cossins	23-Mar-76
2029	Château Pussy Owl: Part 1 - Pussy Owl arrives in France	Brigid Brophy	James Cossins	24-Mar-76
2030	Château Pussy Owl: Part 2 - Grand Gala Opening	Brigid Brophy	James Cossins	25-Mar-76
2031	Château Pussy Owl: Part 3 - Son-et-lumiere	Brigid Brophy	James Cossins	26-Mar-76
2032	In the Grip of the Lemon Fever: Part 1 - Something in the Wind	Alet Schouten	Peter Jeffrey	29-Mar-76
2033	In the Grip of the Lemon Fever: Part 2 - Clean Yourselves	Alet Schouten	Peter Jeffrey	30-Mar-76
2034	In the Grip of the Lemon Fever: Part 3 - Whities	Alet Schouten	Peter Jeffrey	31-Mar-76
2035	In the Grip of the Lemon Fever: Part 4 - The Well is Closed	Alet Schouten	Peter Jeffrey	01-Apr-76
2036	In the Grip of the Lemon Fever: Part 5 - Goodbye Mother Goose	Alet Schouten	Peter Jeffrey	02-Apr-76
2037	Stories from Scotland: The Deepest Loch in the Deepest Glen	Jenny Nimmo	Wendy Wood	05-Apr-76
2038	Stories from Scotland: The Highwayman's Ghost	Jenny Nimmo	Wendy Wood	07-Apr-76
2039	Stories from Scotland: Kirsty and the Greyhound	Jenny Nimmo	Wendy Wood	08-Apr-76
2040	Stories from Scotland: St Columba	Jenny Nimmo	Wendy Wood	09-Apr-76
2041	The Search for Delicious: Part 1 - Ardis the Mermaid	Natalie Babbitt	Angharad Rees	12-Apr-76
2042	The Search for Delicious: Part 2 - The Woldweller	Natalie Babbitt	Angharad Rees	13-Apr-76
2043	The Search for Delicious: Part 3 - The Magic Key	Natalie Babbitt	Angharad Rees	14-Apr-76
2044	The Search for Delicious: Part 4 - War!	Natalie Babbitt	Angharad Rees	15-Apr-76
2045	Dust-up at the Royal Disco and Other Incredible Stories: Dust-up at the Royal Disco	Norman Hunter	Kenneth Williams	20-Apr-76
2046	Dust-up at the Royal Disco and Other Incredible Stories: Whose Move Next?	Norman Hunter	Kenneth Williams	21-Apr-76
2047	Dust-up at the Royal Disco and Other Incredible Stories: The Great Crown Jewel Robbery	Norman Hunter	Kenneth Williams	22-Apr-76
2048	Dust-up at the Royal Disco and Other Incredible Stories: The Singular Story of the Statue	Norman Hunter	Kenneth Williams	23-Apr-76
2049	Rebecca's World: Part 1 - The Telescope	Terry Nation	Bernard Cribbins	26-Apr-76
2050	Rebecca's World: Part 2 - Mister Glister's Tea Party	Terry Nation	Bernard Cribbins	27-Apr-76
2051	Rebecca's World: Part 3 - The Eye of the Needle	Terry Nation	Bernard Cribbins	28-Apr-76
2052	Rebecca's World: Part 4 - Tongue-twisters and Bad Habits	Terry Nation	Bernard Cribbins	29-Apr-76
2053	Rebecca's World: Part 5 - The Last Ghost Tree	Terry Nation	Bernard Cribbins	30-Apr-76
2054	Thunder and Lightnings: Part 1 - Low Flying	Jan Mark	Jeremy Kemp	03-May-76
2055	Thunder and Lightnings: Part 2 - Flight Deck	Jan Mark	Jeremy Kemp	04-May-76
2056	Thunder and Lightnings: Part 3 - The Firegate	Jan Mark	Jeremy Kemp	05-May-76
2057	Thunder and Lightnings: Part 4 - Unknown Warrior	Jan Mark	Jeremy Kemp	06-May-76
2058	Thunder and Lightnings: Part 5 - What a Way to Go	Jan Mark	Jeremy Kemp	07-May-76
2059	Cart and Cwidder: Part 1 - Clennen the Singer	Diana Wynne Jones	Jack Watson	17-May-76
2060	Cart and Cwidder: Part 2 - Lenina's Choice	Diana Wynne Jones	Jack Watson	18-May-76
2061	Cart and Cwidder: Part 3 - Dagner in Danger	Diana Wynne Jones	Jack Watson	19-May-76
2062	Cart and Cwidder: Part 4 - Earl Tholian	Diana Wynne Jones	Jack Watson	20-May-76
2063	Cart and Cwidder: Part 5 - Moril Moves Mountains	Diana Wynne Jones	Jack Watson	21-May-76
2064	The House that Disappeared: Part 1 - The Birthday Present	Ann Stone	Keith Barron	24-May-76
2065	The House that Disappeared: Part 2 - Life with the Giants	Ann Stone	Keith Barron	25-May-76
2066	The House that Disappeared: Part 3 - Return Journey	Ann Stone	Keith Barron	26-May-76
2067	The Great Millionaire Kidnap	Margaret Mahy	Keith Barron	27-May-76
2068	All About the Giant Alexander	Frank Herrmann	Keith Barron	28-May-76
2069	Tommy Mac on Safari: Part 1 - Tommy Mac on Safari	Margaret Stuart Barry	Bernard Holley	01-Jun-76
2070	Tommy Mac on Safari: Part 2 - Uncle Fu's Snake	Margaret Stuart Barry	Bernard Holley	02-Jun-76
2071	Tommy Mac on Safari: Part 3 - The Son of Dracula	Margaret Stuart Barry	Bernard Holley	03-Jun-76
2072	Tommy Mac on Safari: Part 4 - The Terrible Tenant	Margaret Stuart Barry	Bernard Holley	04-Jun-76
2073	Yan and the Gold Mountain Robbers: Part 1 - The Magic Quill	Sydney Paulden	Paul Jones	07-Jun-76
2074	Yan and the Gold Mountain Robbers: Part 2 - Three Ugly Men	Sydney Paulden	Paul Jones	08-Jun-76
2075	Yan and the Gold Mountain Robbers: Part 3 - Goldbeard's Fortress	Sydney Paulden	Paul Jones	09-Jun-76
2076	Yan and the Gold Mountain Robbers: Part 4 - Yan Finds his Mother	Sydney Paulden	Paul Jones	10-Jun-76
2077	Yan and the Gold Mountain Robbers: Part 5 - Home at Last	Sydney Paulden	Paul Jones	11-Jun-76
2078	The Lost Farm: Part 1 - The Reducer	Jane Curry	Peter Marinker	14-Jun-76
2079	The Lost Farm: Part 2 - Reduced	Jane Curry	Peter Marinker	15-Jun-76
2080	The Lost Farm: Part 3 - The Lost Farm	Jane Curry	Peter Marinker	16-Jun-76
2081	The Lost Farm: Part 4 - Miss Boskweiler	Jane Curry	Peter Marinker	17-Jun-76
2082	The Lost Farm: Part 5 - Found Again Farm	Jane Curry	Peter Marinker	18-Jun-76
2083	Mortimer's Tie: Part 1 - Found, One Diamond	Joan Aiken	Bernard Cribbins	13-Sep-76
2084	Mortimer's Tie: Part 2 - The Queen of Bethnal Green	Joan Aiken	Bernard Cribbins	14-Sep-76
2085	Mortimer's Tie: Part 3 - Lost, One Tie	Joan Aiken	Bernard Cribbins	15-Sep-76
2086	Mortimer's Tie: Part 4 - Bird Overboard?	Joan Aiken	Bernard Cribbins	16-Sep-76
2087	Mortimer's Tie: Part 5 - All's Well that Ends Well	Joan Aiken	Bernard Cribbins	17-Sep-76
2088	Una and Grubstreet: Part 1 - The Holiday	Prudence Andrew	Ann Morrish	20-Sep-76
2089	Una and Grubstreet: Part 2 - Mr Welford's Friend	Prudence Andrew	Ann Morrish	21-Sep-76
2090	Una and Grubstreet: Part 3 - Christopher Heaven	Prudence Andrew	Ann Morrish	22-Sep-76
2091	Rodge, Sylvie and Munch	Prudence Andrew	Ann Morrish	23-Sep-76
2092	The Heroic Deeds of Jason Jones	Prudence Andrew	Ann Morrish	24-Sep-76
2093	Princess Spindrift: Part 1 - The Sea-Prince	Sheila MacDonald	Michael Jayston	27-Sep-76
2094	Princess Spindrift: Part 2 - Two Princes Come Wooing	Sheila MacDonald	Michael Jayston	28-Sep-76
2095	Princess Spindrift: Part 3 - The Princess Makes Her Choice	Sheila MacDonald	Michael Jayston	29-Sep-76
2096	Princess Spindrift: Part 4 - The Sea-Palace	Sheila MacDonald	Michael Jayston	30-Sep-76
2097	Princess Spindrift: Part 5 - Jealousy and Love	Sheila MacDonald	Michael Jayston	01-Oct-76
2098	Nothing Ever Happens on Sundays: Part 1 - October Gold	Margaret Greaves	Hugh Burden	04-Oct-76
2099	Nothing Ever Happens on Sundays: Part 2 - Unexpected Visitors	Margaret Greaves	Hugh Burden	05-Oct-76
2100	Nothing Ever Happens on Sundays: Part 3 - Mr Pendlebury 's Busy Week	Margaret Greaves	Hugh Burden	06-Oct-76
2101	Nothing Ever Happens on Sundays: Part 4 - Dub as a Stone	Margaret Greaves	Hugh Burden	07-Oct-76
2102	Nothing Ever Happens on Sundays: Part 5 - Royal Sunday	Margaret Greaves	Hugh Burden	08-Oct-76
2103	The Dolphin Crossing: Part 1 - If Only I Were Old Enough	Jill Paton Walsh	Michael Bryant	11-Oct-76
2104	The Dolphin Crossing: Part 2 - Distant Skirmish	Jill Paton Walsh	Michael Bryant	12-Oct-76
2105	The Dolphin Crossing: Part 3 - Boats in the Channel	Jill Paton Walsh	Michael Bryant	13-Oct-76
2106	The Dolphin Crossing: Part 4 - On the Beaches	Jill Paton Walsh	Michael Bryant	14-Oct-76
2107	The Dolphin Crossing: Part 5 - Fetching them Home	Jill Paton Walsh	Michael Bryant	15-Oct-76
2108	The Lone Arthur: Part 1	Alan Coren	James Villiers	18-Oct-76
2109	The Lone Arthur: Part 2	Alan Coren	James Villiers	19-Oct-76
2110	Arthur the Kid: Part 1	Alan Coren	James Villiers	20-Oct-76
2111	Arthur the Kid: Part 2	Alan Coren	James Villiers	21-Oct-76
2112	Buffalo Arthur	Alan Coren	James Villiers	22-Oct-76
2113	A Stranger Came Ashore: Part 1 - The Stranger	Mollie Hunter	Donald Douglas	25-Oct-76
2114	A Stranger Came Ashore: Part 2 - The Selkie Summer	Mollie Hunter	Donald Douglas	26-Oct-76
2115	A Stranger Came Ashore: Part 3 - Deep Water	Mollie Hunter	Donald Douglas	27-Oct-76
2116	A Stranger Came Ashore: Part 4 - Yarl Corbie	Mollie Hunter	Donald Douglas	28-Oct-76
2117	A Stranger Came Ashore: Part 5 - The Skuddler	Mollie Hunter	Donald Douglas	29-Oct-76
2118	After the Goat Man: Part 1 - Monopoly	Betsy Byars	Keith Barron	01-Nov-76
2119	After the Goat Man: Part 2 - The Goat Man	Betsy Byars	Keith Barron	02-Nov-76
2120	After the Goat Man: Part 3 - Figgy's Accident	Betsy Byars	Keith Barron	03-Nov-76
2121	The Night of the Goat: Part 1 - Traces of the Past	Margaret Greaves	Anna Massey	04-Nov-76
2122	The Night of the Goat: Part 2 - Under the Ground	Margaret Greaves	Anna Massey	05-Nov-76
2123	Sophia Scrooby Preserved: Part 1 - Nono the nameless	Martha Bacon	Marsha Hunt	08-Nov-76
2124	Sophia Scrooby Preserved: Part 2 - The New World	Martha Bacon	Marsha Hunt	09-Nov-76
2125	Sophia Scrooby Preserved: Part 3 - Signor Antonio	Martha Bacon	Marsha Hunt	10-Nov-76
2126	Sophia Scrooby Preserved: Part 4 - The Pirate Ship	Martha Bacon	Marsha Hunt	11-Nov-76
2127	Sophia Scrooby Preserved: Part 5 - Pansy Comes Home	Martha Bacon	Marsha Hunt	12-Nov-76
2128	The Ramayana: Rama and Sita	Traditional Indian tale	Rosalie Crutchley	15-Nov-76
2129	The Ramayana: Rama and Soorpanaka	Traditional Indian tale	Rosalie Crutchley	16-Nov-76
2130	The Ramayana: Rama and the Monkey King	Traditional Indian tale	Rosalie Crutchley	17-Nov-76
2131	The Ramayana: Hanuman, Son of the Wind	Traditional Indian tale	Rosalie Crutchley	18-Nov-76
2132	The Ramayana: Rama and Ravana	Traditional Indian tale	Rosalie Crutchley	19-Nov-76
2133	Mr Moon's Last Case: Part 1 - Leprechauns	Brian Patten	Alfred Burke	22-Nov-76
2134	Mr Moon's Last Case: Part 2 - Greenweed's Map	Brian Patten	Alfred Burke	23-Nov-76
2135	Mr Moon's Last Case: Part 3 - Lewsbury Cathedral	Brian Patten	Alfred Burke	24-Nov-76
2136	Mr Moon's Last Case: Part 4 - Capture	Brian Patten	Alfred Burke	25-Nov-76
2137	Mr Moon's Last Case: Part 5 - The Magic Gates	Brian Patten	Alfred Burke	26-Nov-76
2138	The Nargun and the Stars: Part 1 - Wongadilla	Patricia Wrightson	Mark McManus	29-Nov-76
2139	The Nargun and the Stars: Part 2 - The Potkoorok and the Grader	Patricia Wrightson	Mark McManus	30-Nov-76
2140	The Nargun and the Stars: Part 3 - The Boat Boy	Patricia Wrightson	Mark McManus	01-Dec-76
2141	The Nargun and the Stars: Part 4 - The Nyols	Patricia Wrightson	Mark McManus	02-Dec-76
2142	The Nargun and the Stars: Part 5 - Brother Stone	Patricia Wrightson	Mark McManus	03-Dec-76
2143	The Snow Kitten: Part 1 - Abandoned	Nina Warner Hooke	Hannah Gordon	06-Dec-76
2144	The Snow Kitten: Part 2 - Miss Coker's Tragedy	Nina Warner Hooke	Hannah Gordon	07-Dec-76
2145	The Snow Kitten: Part 3 - Temporary Home	Nina Warner Hooke	Hannah Gordon	08-Dec-76
2146	The Snow Kitten: Part 4 - Slow Starvation	Nina Warner Hooke	Hannah Gordon	09-Dec-76
2147	The Snow Kitten: Part 5 - Unwelcome Visitors	Nina Warner Hooke	Hannah Gordon	10-Dec-76
2148	Alice's Adventures in Wonderland: Part 1 - Curiouser and Curiouser	Lewis Carroll	Michael Hordern	13-Dec-76
2149	Alice's Adventures in Wonderland: Part 2 - The Caucus Race	Lewis Carroll	Michael Hordern	14-Dec-76
2150	Alice's Adventures in Wonderland: Part 3 - The Cheshire Cat	Lewis Carroll	Michael Hordern	15-Dec-76
2151	Alice's Adventures in Wonderland: Part 4 - The Mad Hatter's Tea Party	Lewis Carroll	Michael Hordern	16-Dec-76
2152	Alice's Adventures in Wonderland: Part 5 - The Trial	Lewis Carroll	Michael Hordern	17-Dec-76
2153	The Happy Prince	Oscar Wilde	Alec McCowen	20-Dec-76
2154	The Devoted Friend	Oscar Wilde	Alec McCowen	21-Dec-76
2155	The Nightingale and the Rose	Oscar Wilde	Alec McCowen	22-Dec-76
2156	The Star Child	Oscar Wilde	Alec McCowen	23-Dec-76
2157	The True History of Good King Wenceslas	Joan Aiken	Arthur Lowe	29-Dec-76
2158	The Gift Pig	Joan Aiken	Arthur Lowe	30-Dec-76
2159	The Parrot Pirate Princess	Joan Aiken	Arthur Lowe	31-Dec-76

== 1977 ==
Episode	Story	Written by	Read by	Original air date
2160	The Adventures of Lester: Lester and the Wibbly-Wobbly Business	Quentin Blake		03-Jan-77
2161	The Adventures of Lester: Lester and Cheering-Up Lorna	Quentin Blake		04-Jan-77
2162	The Adventures of Lester: Lester and the Olympic Games	Quentin Blake		05-Jan-77
2163	The Adventures of Lester: Lester and the Genie of the Lamp	Quentin Blake		06-Jan-77
2164	The Adventures of Lester: Lester and the Snow	Quentin Blake		07-Jan-77
2165	Felicia the Critic: Felicia Sorts Out the Broom Cupboard	Ellen Conford	Bonnie Hurren	10-Jan-77
2166	Felicia the Critic: Felicia's Suggestions for Better Traffic Control	Ellen Conford	Bonnie Hurren	11-Jan-77
2167	Felicia the Critic: Felicia Reviews her Aunt's Latest Book	Ellen Conford	Bonnie Hurren	12-Jan-77
2168	Felicia the Critic: Felicia's Observations on her Cousin's Wedding	Ellen Conford	Bonnie Hurren	13-Jan-77
2169	Felicia the Critic: Felicia's Predictions Prove Correct	Ellen Conford	Bonnie Hurren	14-Jan-77
2170	Mister P and his Remarkable Flight: Part 1 - Vincent's Pigeon	David Martin	James Laurenson	17-Jan-77
2171	Mister P and his Remarkable Flight: Part 2 - Mister Figgin	David Martin	James Laurenson	18-Jan-77
2172	Mister P and his Remarkable Flight: Part 3 - The Bushman	David Martin	James Laurenson	19-Jan-77
2173	Mister P and his Remarkable Flight: Part 4 - The Cat	David Martin	James Laurenson	20-Jan-77
2174	Mister P and his Remarkable Flight: Part 5 - Home	David Martin	James Laurenson	21-Jan-77
2175	Binkie and the Quackenbush Dragons: Part 1 - Sir Osmo meets the Dragons	Charles Webster	Jon Pertwee	24-Jan-77
2176	Binkie and the Quackenbush Dragons: Part 2 - Beating the Border Barons	Charles Webster	Jon Pertwee	25-Jan-77
2177	Binkie and the Quackenbush Dragons: Part 3 - The Great Dragon Race	Charles Webster	Jon Pertwee	26-Jan-77
2178	Binkie and the Quackenbush Dragons: Part 4 - Pixo and the Mermaid	Charles Webster	Jon Pertwee	27-Jan-77
2179	Binkie and the Quackenbush Dragons: Part 5 - Flying Fish to the Rescue	Charles Webster	Jon Pertwee	28-Jan-77
2180	The Animal Family: Part 1 - The Hunter and the Mermaid	Randall Jarrell	Anna Massey	07-Feb-77
2181	The Animal Family: Part 2 - The Bear and the Lynx	Randall Jarrell	Anna Massey	08-Feb-77
2182	The Animal Family: Part 3 - The Boy	Randall Jarrell	Anna Massey	09-Feb-77
2183	The Crane: Part 1	Reiner Zimnik	Frank Windsor	10-Feb-77
2184	The Crane: Part 2	Reiner Zimnik	Frank Windsor	11-Feb-77
2185	Dragonfall 5 and the Empty Planet: Part 1 - Time for School	Brian Earnshaw	Ray Brooks	14-Feb-77
2186	Dragonfall 5 and the Empty Planet: Part 2 - Games and Lessons	Brian Earnshaw	Ray Brooks	15-Feb-77
2187	Dragonfall 5 and the Empty Planet: Part 3 - Lost Wood Hollow	Brian Earnshaw	Ray Brooks	16-Feb-77
2188	Dragonfall 5 and the Empty Planet: Part 4 - Walking, Talking Trees	Brian Earnshaw	Ray Brooks	17-Feb-77
2189	Dragonfall 5 and the Empty Planet: Part 5 - The Caves of Ice	Brian Earnshaw	Ray Brooks	18-Feb-77
2190	The Driftway: Part 1 - Running Away	Penelope Lively	Jack Shepherd	21-Feb-77
2191	The Driftway: Part 2 - The First Message	Penelope Lively	Jack Shepherd	22-Feb-77
2192	The Driftway: Part 3 - A Dead Hare	Penelope Lively	Jack Shepherd	23-Feb-77
2193	The Driftway: Part 4 - Matthew Cobham, a Private Man	Penelope Lively	Jack Shepherd	24-Feb-77
2194	The Driftway: Part 5 - Tired but Ordinary	Penelope Lively	Jack Shepherd	25-Feb-77
2195	Jonny Briggs and his Golden Belt: Part 1 - Albertised	Joan Eadington	Bernard Holley	28-Feb-77
2196	Jonny Briggs and his Golden Belt: Part 2 - Talcum Powder	Joan Eadington	Bernard Holley	01-Mar-77
2197	Jonny Briggs and his Golden Belt: Part 3 - Trouble at School	Joan Eadington	Bernard Holley	02-Mar-77
2198	Jonny Briggs and his Golden Belt: Part 4 - Dinner Time	Joan Eadington	Bernard Holley	03-Mar-77
2199	Jonny Briggs and his Golden Belt: Part 5 - The Tide Turns	Joan Eadington	Bernard Holley	04-Mar-77
2200	Stories from Scotland: The Giant's Daughter	Traditional Scottish tale	Wendy Wood	14-Mar-77
2201	Stories from Scotland: The Cairngorm Stone	Traditional Scottish tale	Wendy Wood	15-Mar-77
2202	Stories from Scotland: The Call of the Sea	Traditional Scottish tale	Wendy Wood	16-Mar-77
2203	Stories from Scotland: Long Legs	Traditional Scottish tale	Wendy Wood	17-Mar-77
2204	Stories from Scotland: The Stolen Cheeses	Traditional Scottish tale	Wendy Wood	18-Mar-77
2205	Mr Hardisty's Kind Offer: Part 1 - The Star	Jenny Oldfield	Freddie Jones	21-Mar-77
2206	Mr Hardisty's Kind Offer: Part 2 - The Solicitor	Jenny Oldfield	Freddie Jones	22-Mar-77
2207	Mr Hardisty's Kind Offer: Part 3 - The Companion	Jenny Oldfield	Freddie Jones	23-Mar-77
2208	Mr Hardisty's Kind Offer: Part 4 - The Criminal	Jenny Oldfield	Freddie Jones	24-Mar-77
2209	Mr Hardisty's Kind Offer: Part 5 - The Accused	Jenny Oldfield	Freddie Jones	25-Mar-77
2210	The Claw of Mammon: Part 1 - The Fish and the Stranger	Martin Booth	David Garfield	28-Mar-77
2211	The Claw of Mammon: Part 2 - The Tooth	Martin Booth	David Garfield	30-Mar-77
2212	The Claw of Mammon: Part 3 - The Innocent	Martin Booth	David Garfield	31-Mar-77
2213	The Claw of Mammon: Part 4 - Fire!	Martin Booth	David Garfield	01-Apr-77
2214	The Day Posy Bates Made History	Helen Cresswell	Penelope Keith	07-Jun-77
2215	The Geranium of Flüt: Black Gold in Flüt	Willie Rushton		24-Aug-77
2216	The Coronation Mob	Jan Mark	Julie Covington	12-Sep-77
2217	The Queen with Screaming Hair	Joan Aiken	Bernard Cribbins	13-Sep-77
2218	The Boy who Started a War	Gillian Avery	Aimée Delamain	14-Sep-77
2219	The Queen's Beasts	Willie Rushton		15-Sep-77
2220	Jubilee Bear	Ursula Moray Williams	Judi Dench	16-Sep-77
2221	White Stallion of Lipizza: Part 1 - First in the Queue	Marguerite Henry	Jeremy Kemp	19-Sep-77
2222	White Stallion of Lipizza: Part 2 - The Foaling Place	Marguerite Henry	Jeremy Kemp	20-Sep-77
2223	White Stallion of Lipizza: Part 3 - The Imperial Stables	Marguerite Henry	Jeremy Kemp	21-Sep-77
2224	White Stallion of Lipizza: Part 4 - Spectacular Entrance	Marguerite Henry	Jeremy Kemp	22-Sep-77
2225	White Stallion of Lipizza: Part 5 - One Beam of Splendour	Marguerite Henry	Jeremy Kemp	23-Sep-77
2226	The Church Mice and the Moon	Graham Oakley	Cyril Luckham	28-Sep-77
2227	The Church Mice Spread their Wings	Graham Oakley	Cyril Luckham	29-Sep-77
2228	The Church Mice Adrift	Graham Oakley	Cyril Luckham	30-Sep-77
2229	The Stones of Green Knowe: Part 1 - The Manor House	Lucy M. Boston	Ann Morrish	03-Oct-77
2230	The Stones of Green Knowe: Part 2 - The King and Queen	Lucy M. Boston	Ann Morrish	04-Oct-77
2231	The Stones of Green Knowe: Part 3 - Green Knowe	Lucy M. Boston	Ann Morrish	05-Oct-77
2232	The Fossil Snake: Part 1 - The Awakening	Lucy M. Boston	Ann Morrish	06-Oct-77
2233	The Fossil Snake: Part 2 - Ra's Return	Lucy M. Boston	Ann Morrish	07-Oct-77
2234	Littlenose the Leader: The Timestick	John Grant		10-Oct-77
2235	Littlenose the Leader: The Music Stick	John Grant		11-Oct-77
2236	Littlenose the Leader: Squeaky	John Grant		12-Oct-77
2237	Littlenose the Leader: The Old Man's Spear	John Grant		13-Oct-77
2238	Littlenose the Leader: Littlenose the Leader	John Grant		14-Oct-77
2239	Annerton Pit: Part 1 - The Motorbike	Peter Dickinson	Patrick Stewart	17-Oct-77
2240	Annerton Pit: Part 2 - The Caravan	Peter Dickinson	Patrick Stewart	18-Oct-77
2241	Annerton Pit: Part 3 - Propositions	Peter Dickinson	Patrick Stewart	19-Oct-77
2242	Annerton Pit: Part 4 - The Tunnel	Peter Dickinson	Patrick Stewart	20-Oct-77
2243	Annerton Pit: Part 5 - A Kind of Seeing	Peter Dickinson	Patrick Stewart	21-Oct-77
2244	The Piemakers: The King's Recipe	Helen Cresswell	Polly James	24-Oct-77
2245	The Piemakers: Pepper!	Helen Cresswell	Polly James	25-Oct-77
2246	The Piemakers: The Great Contest	Helen Cresswell	Polly James	26-Oct-77
2247	The Piemakers: The Jolly Dan	Helen Cresswell	Polly James	27-Oct-77
2248	The Piemakers: Arthy makes History	Helen Cresswell	Polly James	28-Oct-77
2249	The Edge of Evening: The Sky-blue Whistling Spark	Nicholas Stuart Gray	Michael Jayston	31-Oct-77
2250	The Edge of Evening: The Edge of Evening	Nicholas Stuart Gray	Michael Jayston	01-Nov-77
2251	The Edge of Evening: Lullaby for a Changeling - Part 1	Nicholas Stuart Gray	Michael Jayston	02-Nov-77
2252	The Edge of Evening: Lullaby for a Changeling - Part 2	Nicholas Stuart Gray	Michael Jayston	03-Nov-77
2253	The Edge of Evening: The Blot on the Landscape	Nicholas Stuart Gray	Michael Jayston	04-Nov-77
2254	A Stitch in Time: Part 1 - The House at Lyme Regis	Penelope Lively	Geraldine McEwan	07-Nov-77
2255	A Stitch in Time: Part 2 - The Sampler	Penelope Lively	Geraldine McEwan	08-Nov-77
2256	A Stitch in Time: Part 3 - Harriet	Penelope Lively	Geraldine McEwan	09-Nov-77
2257	A Stitch in Time: Part 4 - The Swing	Penelope Lively	Geraldine McEwan	10-Nov-77
2258	A Stitch in Time: Part 5 - The Picnic	Penelope Lively	Geraldine McEwan	11-Nov-77
2259	The Lazy Leprechaun: Part 1 - Seamus Leaves Home	Robin Close	Cyril Cusack	14-Nov-77
2260	The Lazy Leprechaun: Part 2 - Seamus Puts a Foot Wrong	Robin Close	Cyril Cusack	15-Nov-77
2261	The Lazy Leprechaun: Part 3 - The Otter's Wisdom	Robin Close	Cyril Cusack	16-Nov-77
2262	The Lazy Leprechaun: Part 4 - Seamus to the Rescue	Robin Close	Cyril Cusack	17-Nov-77
2263	The Lazy Leprechaun: Part 5 - Seamus's Secret	Robin Close	Cyril Cusack	18-Nov-77
2264	The School at Schellebelle: Part 1 - Goodbye to Miss Jonathan	Gertie Evenhuis	Kate Binchy	21-Nov-77
2265	The School at Schellebelle: Part 2 - The Quarrel	Gertie Evenhuis	Kate Binchy	22-Nov-77
2266	The School at Schellebelle: Part 3 - Old Pier	Gertie Evenhuis	Kate Binchy	23-Nov-77
2267	The School at Schellebelle: Part 4 - The Lane	Gertie Evenhuis	Kate Binchy	24-Nov-77
2268	The School at Schellebelle: Part 5 - Miss Jonathan Returns	Gertie Evenhuis	Kate Binchy	25-Nov-77
2269	Charmed Life: Part 1 - Advanced Magic	Diana Wynne Jones	Sorcha Cusack	28-Nov-77
2270	Charmed Life: Part 2 - Purple Fire and Dragon's Blood	Diana Wynne Jones	Sorcha Cusack	29-Nov-77
2271	Charmed Life: Part 3 - Other Worlds	Diana Wynne Jones	Sorcha Cusack	30-Nov-77
2272	Charmed Life: Part 4 - Nine Lives	Diana Wynne Jones	Sorcha Cusack	01-Dec-77
2273	Charmed Life: Part 5 - The Enchanter	Diana Wynne Jones	Sorcha Cusack	02-Dec-77
2274	A Baker of Genius and Mouthwatering Simplicity	Brian Patten	Arthur Lowe	05-Dec-77
2275	The Road	Leon Garfield	Michael Aldridge	06-Dec-77
2276	Princess by Mistake	Penelope Lively	Martin Jarvis	07-Dec-77
2277	Rascally Tag	Alan Garner	Michael Jayston	08-Dec-77
2278	A Nice Touch of Colour	Margaret Greaves	June Whitfield	09-Dec-77
2279	The Ghost of Thomas Kempe: Part 1 - The First Message	Penelope Lively	Ronald Pickup	12-Dec-77
2280	The Ghost of Thomas Kempe: Part 2 - Sorcerer's Apprentice	Penelope Lively	Ronald Pickup	13-Dec-77
2281	The Ghost of Thomas Kempe: Part 3 - Begone!	Penelope Lively	Ronald Pickup	14-Dec-77
2282	The Ghost of Thomas Kempe: Part 4 - Widdow Veritie is a Wytche	Penelope Lively	Ronald Pickup	15-Dec-77
2283	The Ghost of Thomas Kempe: Part 5 - A Ghost is Laid	Penelope Lively	Ronald Pickup	16-Dec-77
2284	Stories for Christmas: The Holly Bears a Berry	Alison Uttley	Hannah Gordon	19-Dec-77
2285	Stories for Christmas: The Christmas Box	Alison Uttley	Hannah Gordon	20-Dec-77
2286	Stories for Christmas: The Snow Maiden	Alison Uttley	Hannah Gordon	21-Dec-77
2287	Stories for Christmas: The Fairy Ship	Alison Uttley	Hannah Gordon	22-Dec-77
2288	Babar the Elephant: Babar and Father Christmas	Jean de Brunhoff	Maurice Roëves	23-Dec-77
2289	Stories for Christmas: The Fir Trees and the Christmas Tree	Alison Uttley	Hannah Gordon	23-Dec-77
2290	Cooks and Prophecies	Joan Aiken	Arthur Lowe	28-Dec-77
2291	A Year and a Day: Part 1 - The Bowjey	William Mayne	Rosemary Leach	28-Dec-77
2292	Grandpapa's Folly and the Woodworm Bookworm	Ursula Moray Williams	Gwen Watford	29-Dec-77
2293	A Year and a Day: Part 2 - The Saracens	William Mayne	Rosemary Leach	29-Dec-77
2294	Spartacus Mouse	Joy Littlewood	Julian Orchard	30-Dec-77
2295	A Year and a Day: Part 3 - Adam	William Mayne	Rosemary Leach	30-Dec-77

== 1978 ==
Episode	Story	Written by	Read by	Original air date
2296	The Golden Bird: Part 1 - The Three Wishes	Edith Brill	Claire Bloom	02-Jan-78
2297	The Golden Bird: Part 2 - Bat-Ears, the Robber	Edith Brill	Claire Bloom	03-Jan-78
2298	The Golden Bird: Part 3 - The Magician pays his Debt	Edith Brill	Claire Bloom	04-Jan-78
2299	The Golden Bird: Part 4 - The Grey Gander	Edith Brill	Claire Bloom	05-Jan-78
2300	The Golden Bird: Part 5 - The King	Edith Brill	Claire Bloom	06-Jan-78
2301	The Adventures of Sinbad the Sailor: Sinbad the Sailor	Traditional Middle Eastern tale	Paul Jones	09-Jan-78
2302	The Adventures of Sinbad the Sailor: Sinbad and the Magnetic Mountain	Traditional Middle Eastern tale	Paul Jones	10-Jan-78
2303	The Adventures of Sinbad the Sailor: Sinbad and the Flying Carpet	Traditional Middle Eastern tale	Paul Jones	11-Jan-78
2304	The Adventures of Sinbad the Sailor: Sinbad and the Sultan of the Seas	Traditional Middle Eastern tale	Paul Jones	12-Jan-78
2305	The Adventures of Sinbad the Sailor: Sinbad and the Tamed Demon	Traditional Middle Eastern tale	Paul Jones	13-Jan-78
2306	The House that Sailed Away: Part 1 - One Very Rainy Day in Hampstead	Pat Hutchins	June Whitfield	16-Jan-78
2307	The House that Sailed Away: Part 2 - Worse things Happen at Sea	Pat Hutchins	June Whitfield	17-Jan-78
2308	The House that Sailed Away: Part 3 - Buried Treasure!	Pat Hutchins	June Whitfield	18-Jan-78
2309	The House that Sailed Away: Part 4 - The Trap!	Pat Hutchins	June Whitfield	19-Jan-78
2310	The House that Sailed Away: Part 5 - Love at First Sight	Pat Hutchins	June Whitfield	20-Jan-78
2311	Shiva's Pearls: Part 1 - The Orphanage	Harriet Graham	Jan Francis	23-Jan-78
2312	Shiva's Pearls: Part 2 - Mrs Crighton	Harriet Graham	Jan Francis	24-Jan-78
2313	Shiva's Pearls: Part 3 - Aysgirth's Folly	Harriet Graham	Jan Francis	25-Jan-78
2314	Shiva's Pearls: Part 4 - Ottalie Disappears	Harriet Graham	Jan Francis	26-Jan-78
2315	Shiva's Pearls: Part 5 - Return to Aysgirth's Folly	Harriet Graham	Jan Francis	27-Jan-78
2316	The Farthest-Away Mountain: Part 1 - The Call	Lynne Reid Banks	Jane Asher	30-Jan-78
2317	The Farthest-Away Mountain: Part 2 - The Gargoyles	Lynne Reid Banks	Jane Asher	31-Jan-78
2318	The Farthest-Away Mountain: Part 3 - Graw	Lynne Reid Banks	Jane Asher	01-Feb-78
2319	The Farthest-Away Mountain: Part 4 - The Witch	Lynne Reid Banks	Jane Asher	02-Feb-78
2320	The Farthest-Away Mountain: Part 5 - The Ring	Lynne Reid Banks	Jane Asher	03-Feb-78
2321	Agaton Sax and the League of Silent Exploders: Part 1 - An Outrageous Mistake	Nils-Olof Franzén	Kenneth Williams	06-Feb-78
2322	Agaton Sax and the League of Silent Exploders: Part 2 - Wanted	Nils-Olof Franzén	Kenneth Williams	07-Feb-78
2323	Agaton Sax and the League of Silent Exploders: Part 3 - The Magnetic Mr Kark	Nils-Olof Franzén	Kenneth Williams	08-Feb-78
2324	Agaton Sax and the League of Silent Exploders: Part 4 - An Unfortunate Television Appearance	Nils-Olof Franzén	Kenneth Williams	09-Feb-78
2325	Agaton Sax and the League of Silent Exploders: Part 5 - Veterans to the Rescue	Nils-Olof Franzén	Kenneth Williams	10-Feb-78
2326	Thomas and the Rag Man's Coat: Part 1 - The Coat	Harriet Graham	Peter Bourke	13-Feb-78
2327	Thomas and the Rag Man's Coat: Part 2 - The Little Violin	Harriet Graham	Peter Bourke	14-Feb-78
2328	Thomas and the Rag Man's Coat: Part 3 - The Playground	Harriet Graham	Peter Bourke	15-Feb-78
2329	Thomas and the Rag Man's Coat: Part 4 - The Ice-cream Parlour	Harriet Graham	Peter Bourke	16-Feb-78
2330	Thomas and the Rag Man's Coat: Part 5 - The Primrose Wood	Harriet Graham	Peter Bourke	17-Feb-78
2331	The Toughest Town in the West: Part 1 - Horse Thieves	Nick Sheridan	William Hootkins	20-Feb-78
2332	The Toughest Town in the West: Part 2 - Desperate Men	Nick Sheridan	William Hootkins	21-Feb-78
2333	The Toughest Town in the West: Part 3 - Gold Fever	Nick Sheridan	William Hootkins	22-Feb-78
2334	The Toughest Town in the West: Part 4 - The Code of the West	Nick Sheridan	William Hootkins	23-Feb-78
2335	The Toughest Town in the West: Part 5 - Dead or Alive	Nick Sheridan	William Hootkins	24-Feb-78
2336	Go Tell It to Mrs Golightly: Part 1 - A Cold Reception	Catherine Cookson	Susan Jameson	27-Feb-78
2337	Go Tell It to Mrs Golightly: Part 2 - The Outing	Catherine Cookson	Susan Jameson	28-Feb-78
2338	Go Tell It to Mrs Golightly: Part 3 - Bound and Gagged	Catherine Cookson	Susan Jameson	01-Mar-78
2339	Go Tell It to Mrs Golightly: Part 4 - In the dark	Catherine Cookson	Susan Jameson	02-Mar-78
2340	Go Tell It to Mrs Golightly: Part 5 - Break Out	Catherine Cookson	Susan Jameson	03-Mar-78
2341	Merlin's Mistake: Part 1 - The Quest	Robert Newman	Simon Williams	06-Mar-78
2342	Merlin's Mistake: Part 2 - The Black Knight	Robert Newman	Simon Williams	07-Mar-78
2343	Merlin's Mistake: Part 3 - Starflame	Robert Newman	Simon Williams	08-Mar-78
2344	Merlin's Mistake: Part 4 - The Dark Lady	Robert Newman	Simon Williams	09-Mar-78
2345	Merlin's Mistake: Part 5 - The Knight with the Red Shield	Robert Newman	Simon Williams	10-Mar-78
2346	Daylight Robbery: Part 1 - The Bridge Builders	Jay Williams	Bonnie Hurren	13-Mar-78
2347	Daylight Robbery: Part 2 - Becoming a Detective	Jay Williams	Bonnie Hurren	14-Mar-78
2348	Daylight Robbery: Part 3 - Penny and Jerry	Jay Williams	Bonnie Hurren	15-Mar-78
2349	Daylight Robbery: Part 4 - The Salesman	Jay Williams	Bonnie Hurren	16-Mar-78
2350	Daylight Robbery: Part 5 - The View in the Mirror	Jay Williams	Bonnie Hurren	17-Mar-78
2351	Tales from Arab Lands: Brother Fish	Traditional Middle Eastern tale	Michael Aldridge	20-Mar-78
2352	Tales from Arab Lands: Jamila	Traditional Middle Eastern tale	Michael Aldridge	21-Mar-78
2353	Tales from Arab Lands: The Wicked Jinni	Traditional Middle Eastern tale	Michael Aldridge	22-Mar-78
2354	Tales from Arab Lands: Ladybird	Traditional Middle Eastern tale	Michael Aldridge	23-Mar-78
2355	Jonny Briggs and the Ghost: Part 1 - Rumours	Joan Eadington	Bernard Holley	28-Mar-78
2356	Jonny Briggs and the Ghost: Part 2 - Trapped!	Joan Eadington	Bernard Holley	29-Mar-78
2357	Jonny Briggs and the Ghost: Part 3 - Cabbages	Joan Eadington	Bernard Holley	30-Mar-78
2358	Jonny Briggs and the Ghost: Part 4 - The Football	Joan Eadington	Bernard Holley	31-Mar-78
2359	African Legends: The Magic Bird	Amabel Williams-Ellis	Olu Jacobs	07-Aug-78
2360	African Legends: The Rain-God's Daughter	Amabel Williams-Ellis	Olu Jacobs	08-Aug-78
2361	African Legends: Praise be to Cat	Amabel Williams-Ellis	Olu Jacobs	09-Aug-78
2362	African Legends: My Berries	Amabel Williams-Ellis	Olu Jacobs	10-Aug-78
2363	African Legends: The Drinking Hole	Amabel Williams-Ellis	Olu Jacobs	11-Aug-78
2364	Planet of Fear: Part 1 - Minor Planet No 6547	Patrick Moore		16-Oct-78
2365	Planet of Fear: Part 2 - Rescue Mission	Patrick Moore		17-Oct-78
2366	Planet of Fear: Part 3 - Crash Landing	Patrick Moore		18-Oct-78
2367	Planet of Fear: Part 4 - The Secret of the Cave	Patrick Moore		19-Oct-78
2368	Planet of Fear: Part 5 - Blast-off	Patrick Moore		20-Oct-78
2369	Ferret Summer: Part 1 - Dan	Brigid Chard	Maurice Denham	23-Oct-78
2370	Ferret Summer: Part 2 - The Big House	Brigid Chard	Maurice Denham	24-Oct-78
2371	Ferret Summer: Part 3 - Ferret	Brigid Chard	Maurice Denham	25-Oct-78
2372	Ferret Summer: Part 4 - Rabbits	Brigid Chard	Maurice Denham	26-Oct-78
2373	Ferret Summer: Part 5 - Badgers	Brigid Chard	Maurice Denham	27-Oct-78
2374	The Worst Witch: Part 1 - Ethel becomes a Pig	Jill Murphy	Rosemary Leach	30-Oct-78
2375	The Worst Witch: Part 2 - Mildred's Disgrace	Jill Murphy	Rosemary Leach	31-Oct-78
2376	The Worst Witch: Part 3 - Mildred and the Snails	Jill Murphy	Rosemary Leach	01-Nov-78
2377	Sisters in Sorcery	Nicholas Stuart Gray	Rosemary Leach	02-Nov-78
2378	How Mere is Moonshine?	Nicholas Stuart Gray	Rosemary Leach	03-Nov-78
2379	Tales from Tartary: Shaitan the Devil and his 40 Daughters	James Riordan	Derek Jacobi	06-Nov-78
2380	Tales from Tartary: The Tale of the Three Talismans	James Riordan	Derek Jacobi	07-Nov-78
2381	Tales from Tartary: The Fern Girl	James Riordan	Derek Jacobi	08-Nov-78
2382	Tales from Tartary: Altynchech and the Padishah's Wife	James Riordan	Derek Jacobi	09-Nov-78
2383	Tales from Tartary: Aldar-Kose and Shigai Bai	James Riordan	Derek Jacobi	10-Nov-78
2384	Pepito: Part 1 - Friendship	Nina Warner Hooke	Steve Hodson	13-Nov-78
2385	Pepito: Part 2 - Escape	Nina Warner Hooke	Steve Hodson	14-Nov-78
2386	Pepito: Part 3 - Freedom	Nina Warner Hooke	Steve Hodson	15-Nov-78
2387	Pepito: Part 4 - Rescue	Nina Warner Hooke	Steve Hodson	16-Nov-78
2388	Pepito: Part 5 - Saved	Nina Warner Hooke	Steve Hodson	17-Nov-78
2389	The Dribblesome Teapots and Other Incredible Stories: The Dribblesome Teapots	Norman Hunter	Kenneth Williams	20-Nov-78
2390	The Dribblesome Teapots and Other Incredible Stories: The Priceless Present	Norman Hunter	Kenneth Williams	21-Nov-78
2391	The Dribblesome Teapots and Other Incredible Stories: The Dragon Who Cheated	Norman Hunter	Kenneth Williams	22-Nov-78
2392	The Dribblesome Teapots and Other Incredible Stories: The King with the Paper Face	Norman Hunter	Kenneth Williams	23-Nov-78
2393	The Dribblesome Teapots and Other Incredible Stories: The Unsuitable Suits	Norman Hunter	Kenneth Williams	24-Nov-78
2394	Willow's Luck: Part 1 - The Hut in the Wood	Gabriel Alington	Ronald Pickup	27-Nov-78
2395	Willow's Luck: Part 2 - A Secret Friend	Gabriel Alington	Ronald Pickup	28-Nov-78
2396	Willow's Luck: Part 3 - Badger's Wood	Gabriel Alington	Ronald Pickup	29-Nov-78
2397	Willow's Luck: Part 4 - The Gypsy Girl	Gabriel Alington	Ronald Pickup	30-Nov-78
2398	Willow's Luck: Part 5 - A Helping Hand	Gabriel Alington	Ronald Pickup	01-Dec-78
2399	The Moon in the Cloud: Part 1 - Noah's Vision	Rosemary Harris	Ian McKellen	11-Dec-78
2400	The Moon in the Cloud: Part 2 - Cats of One Colour	Rosemary Harris	Ian McKellen	12-Dec-78
2401	The Moon in the Cloud: Part 3 - The King's Musician	Rosemary Harris	Ian McKellen	13-Dec-78
2402	The Moon in the Cloud: Part 4 - The King's Rings	Rosemary Harris	Ian McKellen	14-Dec-78
2403	The Moon in the Cloud: Part 5 - Ham's Empty Promise	Rosemary Harris	Ian McKellen	15-Dec-78
2404	Writing Competition Winners: The Countryside	Stories written by Children	Kenneth Williams/June Whitfield/Wally Whyton	18-Dec-78
2405	Writing Competition Winners: The Sea	Stories written by Children	Kenneth Williams/Vivian Pickles/Martin Jarvis	19-Dec-78
2406	Writing Competition Winners: Magic	Stories written by Children	Kenneth Williams/Rosemary Leach/John Laurie	20-Dec-78
2407	Writing Competition Winners: Space	Stories written by Children	Kenneth Williams/Ann Morrish/Ray Brooks	21-Dec-78
2408	Writing Competition Winners: Adventure	Stories written by Children	Kenneth Williams/Margaret Tyzack/Jack Shepherd	22-Dec-78
2409	The Last of the Dragons	E. Nesbit	Timothy Davies	27-Dec-78
2410	Belinda and Bellamant	E. Nesbit	Timothy Davies	28-Dec-78
2411	The Charmed Life	E. Nesbit	Timothy Davies	29-Dec-78

== 1979 ==
Episode	Story	Written by	Read by	Original air date
2412	Fanny's Sister	Penelope Lively	Jane Lapotaire	01-Jan-79
2413	Fanny and the Monsters: Part 1	Penelope Lively	Jane Lapotaire	02-Jan-79
2414	Fanny and the Monsters: Part 2	Penelope Lively	Jane Lapotaire	03-Jan-79
2415	Boy without a Name	Penelope Lively	Jane Lapotaire	04-Jan-79
2416	The Stained Glass Window	Penelope Lively	Jane Lapotaire	05-Jan-79
2417	Alice Through the Looking-Glass: Part 1 - The Garden of Live Flowers	Lewis Carroll	Michael Hordern	08-Jan-79
2418	Alice Through the Looking-Glass: Part 2 - Tweedledum and Tweedledee	Lewis Carroll	Michael Hordern	09-Jan-79
2419	Alice Through the Looking-Glass: Part 3 - Humpty Dumpty	Lewis Carroll	Michael Hordern	10-Jan-79
2420	Alice Through the Looking-Glass: Part 4 - The White Knight	Lewis Carroll	Michael Hordern	11-Jan-79
2421	Alice Through the Looking-Glass: Part 5 - Queen Alice	Lewis Carroll	Michael Hordern	12-Jan-79
2422	Rebellion at Orford Castle: Part 1 - The Boar Hunt	Joanna Hickson	Tom Chadbon	15-Jan-79
2423	Rebellion at Orford Castle: Part 2 - The Judas Tree	Joanna Hickson	Tom Chadbon	16-Jan-79
2424	Rebellion at Orford Castle: Part 3 - Night Journey	Joanna Hickson	Tom Chadbon	17-Jan-79
2425	Rebellion at Orford Castle: Part 4 - The Battle for Orford	Joanna Hickson	Tom Chadbon	18-Jan-79
2426	Rebellion at Orford Castle: Part 5 - The Stag and The Martlet	Joanna Hickson	Tom Chadbon	19-Jan-79
2427	The Spiral Stair: Part 1	Joan Aiken	Bernard Cribbins	22-Jan-79
2428	The Spiral Stair: Part 2	Joan Aiken	Bernard Cribbins	23-Jan-79
2429	The Spiral Stair: Part 3	Joan Aiken	Bernard Cribbins	24-Jan-79
2430	Mortimer and the Sword Excalibur: Part 1	Joan Aiken	Bernard Cribbins	25-Jan-79
2431	Mortimer and the Sword Excalibur: Part 2	Joan Aiken	Bernard Cribbins	26-Jan-79
2432	The Pinballs: Part 1	Betsy Byars	Jana Shelden	29-Jan-79
2433	The Pinballs: Part 2	Betsy Byars	Jana Shelden	30-Jan-79
2434	The Pinballs: Part 3	Betsy Byars	Jana Shelden	31-Jan-79
2435	The Pinballs: Part 4	Betsy Byars	Jana Shelden	01-Feb-79
2436	The Pinballs: Part 5	Betsy Byars	Jana Shelden	02-Feb-79
2437	Writing Competition Winner: The Reluctant Wizard	Penelope Noble (aged 10)	Martin Jarvis	07-Feb-79
2438	Writing Competition Winner: A Lost Cause	Sue Cosgrove (aged 13)	Martin Jarvis	08-Feb-79
2439	Writing Competition Winner: A Frog he Would a-Singing Go	Victoria Palmer (aged 11)	Martin Jarvis	09-Feb-79
2440	The Ivory Anvil: Part 1 - A Problem in School	Sylvia Fair	Victoria Plucknett	12-Feb-79
2441	The Ivory Anvil: Part 2 - The Triangular Room	Sylvia Fair	Victoria Plucknett	13-Feb-79
2442	The Ivory Anvil: Part 3 - Doubting Thomas	Sylvia Fair	Victoria Plucknett	14-Feb-79
2443	The Ivory Anvil: Part 4 - The Drowned House	Sylvia Fair	Victoria Plucknett	15-Feb-79
2444	The Ivory Anvil: Part 5 - Free of the Nightmare	Sylvia Fair	Victoria Plucknett	16-Feb-79
2445	Scottish Legends: The Potter and the Giants	Jenny Nimmo	Maurice Roëves	26-Feb-79
2446	Scottish Legends: The Magic Milking Stool	Jenny Nimmo	Maurice Roëves	27-Feb-79
2447	Scottish Legends: Robin and the White Hind	Jenny Nimmo	Maurice Roëves	28-Feb-79
2448	Scottish Legends: The Ghostly Clan	Jenny Nimmo	Maurice Roëves	01-Mar-79
2449	Scottish Legends: The Children of the Waterhorse	Jenny Nimmo	Maurice Roëves	02-Mar-79
2450	The Battle of Bubble and Squeak: Round 1	Philippa Pearce	Bridget Turner	05-Mar-79
2451	The Battle of Bubble and Squeak: Round 2	Philippa Pearce	Bridget Turner	06-Mar-79
2452	The Battle of Bubble and Squeak: Round 3	Philippa Pearce	Bridget Turner	07-Mar-79
2453	The Battle of Bubble and Squeak: Round 4	Philippa Pearce	Bridget Turner	08-Mar-79
2454	The Battle of Bubble and Squeak: Round 5	Philippa Pearce	Bridget Turner	09-Mar-79
2455	Jonny Briggs and the Whitby Weekend: Part 1 - Sausages	Joan Eadington	Bernard Holley	12-Mar-79
2456	Jonny Briggs and the Whitby Weekend: Part 2 - The Train	Joan Eadington	Bernard Holley	13-Mar-79
2457	Jonny Briggs and the Whitby Weekend: Part 3 - Razzle	Joan Eadington	Bernard Holley	14-Mar-79
2458	Jonny Briggs and the Whitby Weekend: Part 4 - Bed and Breakfast	Joan Eadington	Bernard Holley	15-Mar-79
2459	Jonny Briggs and the Whitby Weekend: Part 5 - Rita to the Rescue	Joan Eadington	Bernard Holley	16-Mar-79
2460	Country Tales: The Tale of Brave Augustus	Elizabeth Clark	Betty Hardy	19-Mar-79
2461	Country Tales: The Tale of Mr and Mrs Peppercorm	Elizabeth Clark	Betty Hardy	20-Mar-79
2462	Country Tales: The Tale of Mrs Honeycritch	Elizabeth Clark	Betty Hardy	21-Mar-79
2463	Country Tales: The Tale of the Old Iron Pot	Elizabeth Clark	Betty Hardy	22-Mar-79
2464	Country Tales: The Fairy Widower	Eileen Molony	Betty Hardy	23-Mar-79
2465	At Willie Tucker's Place: Part 1 - Dan goes on a Visit	Alison Morgan	Brendan Price	26-Mar-79
2466	At Willie Tucker's Place: Part 2 - Operation Ferret	Alison Morgan	Brendan Price	27-Mar-79
2467	At Willie Tucker's Place: Part 3 - In a Tight Spot	Alison Morgan	Brendan Price	28-Mar-79
2468	At Willie Tucker's Place: Part 4 - The Map	Alison Morgan	Brendan Price	29-Mar-79
2469	At Willie Tucker's Place: Part 5 - A Dangerous Venture	Alison Morgan	Brendan Price	30-Mar-79
2470	The Hobbit: Part 1 - An Unexpected Journey	J. R. R. Tolkien	Bernard Cribbins/Maurice Denham/Jan Francis/David Wood	01-Oct-79
2471	The Hobbit: Part 2 - Over Hill and Under Hill	J. R. R. Tolkien	Bernard Cribbins/Maurice Denham/Jan Francis/David Wood	02-Oct-79
2472	The Hobbit: Part 3 - Riddles in the Dark	J. R. R. Tolkien	Bernard Cribbins/Maurice Denham/Jan Francis/David Wood	03-Oct-79
2473	The Hobbit: Part 4 - Out of the Frying-pan into the Fire	J. R. R. Tolkien	Bernard Cribbins/Maurice Denham/Jan Francis/David Wood	04-Oct-79
2474	The Hobbit: Part 5 - Flies and Spiders	J. R. R. Tolkien	Bernard Cribbins/Maurice Denham/Jan Francis/David Wood	05-Oct-79
2475	The Hobbit: Part 6 - Barrels out of Bond	J. R. R. Tolkien	Bernard Cribbins/Maurice Denham/Jan Francis/David Wood	08-Oct-79
2476	The Hobbit: Part 7 - Inside Information	J. R. R. Tolkien	Bernard Cribbins/Maurice Denham/Jan Francis/David Wood	09-Oct-79
2477	The Hobbit: Part 8 - Fire and Water	J. R. R. Tolkien	Bernard Cribbins/Maurice Denham/Jan Francis/David Wood	10-Oct-79
2478	The Hobbit: Part 9 - The Clouds Burst	J. R. R. Tolkien	Bernard Cribbins/Maurice Denham/Jan Francis/David Wood	11-Oct-79
2479	The Hobbit: Part 10 - The Last Stage	J. R. R. Tolkien	Bernard Cribbins/Maurice Denham/Jan Francis/David Wood	12-Oct-79
2480	Charlie and the Chocolate Factory: Part 1	Roald Dahl	Elaine Stritch	15-Oct-79
2481	Charlie and the Chocolate Factory: Part 2	Roald Dahl	Elaine Stritch	16-Oct-79
2482	Charlie and the Chocolate Factory: Part 3	Roald Dahl	Elaine Stritch	17-Oct-79
2483	Charlie and the Chocolate Factory: Part 4	Roald Dahl	Elaine Stritch	18-Oct-79
2484	Charlie and the Chocolate Factory: Part 5	Roald Dahl	Elaine Stritch	19-Oct-79
2485	The Wildling: Part 1 - The First Stranger	Violet Bibby	James Laurenson	22-Oct-79
2486	The Wildling: Part 2 - Night Alarms	Violet Bibby	James Laurenson	23-Oct-79
2487	The Wildling: Part 3 - Official Inquiries	Violet Bibby	James Laurenson	24-Oct-79
2488	The Wildling: Part 4 - Fang	Violet Bibby	James Laurenson	25-Oct-79
2489	The Wildling: Part 5 - The Hero	Violet Bibby	James Laurenson	26-Oct-79
2490	The Witch in Our Attic: Part 1 - Great Great Grandma Dooley's Little Book	Brian Ball	June Whitfield	29-Oct-79
2491	The Witch in Our Attic: Part 2 - Removals	Brian Ball	June Whitfield	30-Oct-79
2492	The Witch in Our Attic: Part 3 - Donkey's Ears	Brian Ball	June Whitfield	31-Oct-79
2493	The Witch in Our Attic: Part 4 - Mr Witty's Powders	Brian Ball	June Whitfield	01-Nov-79
2494	The Witch in Our Attic: Part 5 - Pestiferous Enemies	Brian Ball	June Whitfield	02-Nov-79
2495	Russian Blue: Part 1 - Bluey	Helen Griffiths	Elizabeth Estensen	05-Nov-79
2496	Russian Blue: Part 2 - Collision	Helen Griffiths	Elizabeth Estensen	06-Nov-79
2497	Russian Blue: Part 3 - Abby	Helen Griffiths	Elizabeth Estensen	07-Nov-79
2498	Russian Blue: Part 4 - Artie Alone	Helen Griffiths	Elizabeth Estensen	08-Nov-79
2499	Russian Blue: Part 5 - Sacha Again	Helen Griffiths	Elizabeth Estensen	09-Nov-79
2500	The Treasure of Dubarry Castle: Part 1 - A Sad Farewall	Lindsay Brown		12-Nov-79
2501	The Treasure of Dubarry Castle: Part 2 - The Circus Comes to Town	Lindsay Brown		13-Nov-79
2502	The Treasure of Dubarry Castle: Part 3 - An Unexpected Journey	Lindsay Brown		14-Nov-79
2503	The Treasure of Dubarry Castle: Part 4 - An Iron Door and a Secret Passage	Lindsay Brown		15-Nov-79
2504	The Treasure of Dubarry Castle: Part 5 - Welcome Home!	Lindsay Brown		16-Nov-79
2505	King Canoodlum and the Great Horned Cheese: Part 1 - A Very Strange Birthday Party	Joseph O'Conor		19-Nov-79
2506	King Canoodlum and the Great Horned Cheese: Part 2 - Prince Wensleydale	Joseph O'Conor		20-Nov-79
2507	King Canoodlum and the Great Horned Cheese: Part 3 - King Ruzzabuzzbuzz	Joseph O'Conor		21-Nov-79
2508	King Canoodlum and the Great Horned Cheese: Part 4 - A Gamble for Life and Death	Joseph O'Conor		22-Nov-79
2509	King Canoodlum and the Great Horned Cheese: Part 5 - The Stonnitch	Joseph O'Conor		23-Nov-79
2510	Abel's Island: Part 1 - Happy Anniversary	William Steig	Peter Barkworth	26-Nov-79
2511	Abel's Island: Part 2 - The Log	William Steig	Peter Barkworth	27-Nov-79
2512	Abel's Island: Part 3 - The Winged Assassin	William Steig	Peter Barkworth	28-Nov-79
2513	Abel's Island: Part 4 - A Second Visitor	William Steig	Peter Barkworth	29-Nov-79
2514	Abel's Island: Part 5 - Escape at Last	William Steig	Peter Barkworth	30-Nov-79
2515	The Elephant War: Part 1 - Harriet Attacks	Gillian Avery	Janet Maw	03-Dec-79
2516	The Elephant War: Part 2 - Agatha Attacks	Gillian Avery	Janet Maw	04-Dec-79
2517	The Elephant War: Part 3 - A New Recruit	Gillian Avery	Janet Maw	05-Dec-79
2518	The Elephant War: Part 4 - Jumbo for Ever	Gillian Avery	Janet Maw	06-Dec-79
2519	The Elephant War: Part 5 - Fall In, Young Ladies	Gillian Avery	Janet Maw	07-Dec-79
2520	Littlenose's Friend	John Grant		10-Dec-79
2521	The Juniper Cousins	John Grant		11-Dec-79
2522	Littlenose the Dancer	John Grant		12-Dec-79
2523	Littlenose's Birthday	John Grant		13-Dec-79
2524	Littlenose the Decoy	John Grant		14-Dec-79
2525	Ronnie and the Haunted Rolls-Royce	John Antrobus	Spike Milligan	17-Dec-79
2526	Help! I'm a Prisoner in a Toothpaste Factory: Part 1	John Antrobus	Spike Milligan	18-Dec-79
2527	Help! I'm a Prisoner in a Toothpaste Factory: Part 2	John Antrobus	Spike Milligan	19-Dec-79
2528	Help! I'm a Prisoner in a Toothpaste Factory: Part 3	John Antrobus	Spike Milligan	20-Dec-79
2529	Help! I'm a Prisoner in a Toothpaste Factory: Part 4	John Antrobus	Spike Milligan	21-Dec-79
2530	The Black Lamb of Bethlehem	Rosemary Harris	Sinéad Cusack	24-Dec-79
2531	St George for Lucky England	Rosemary Harris	Richard Briers	27-Dec-79
2532	Lord Wolf	Rosemary Harris	Andrew Sachs	28-Dec-79
2533	Winnie-the-Pooh: Eeyore Loses a Tail	A. A. Milne	Willie Rushton	31-Dec-79

== 1980 ==
Episode	Story	Written by	Read by	Original air date
2534	Billy and William	E. Nesbit	Timothy Davies	01-Jan-80
2535	The White Horse	E. Nesbit	Timothy Davies	02-Jan-80
2536	Winnie-the-Pooh: Pooh Invents a New Game	A. A. Milne	Willie Rushton	02-Jan-80
2537	Writing Competition Winner: The Bionic Moles	Clare Moseley (aged 9)	Martin Jarvis	03-Jan-80
2538	Winnie-the-Pooh: Rabbit Has a Busy Day	A. A. Milne	Willie Rushton	03-Jan-80
2539	Writing Competition Winner: A Battle of Worlds	Philip Quail (aged 13)	Martin Jarvis	04-Jan-80
2540	Winnie-the-Pooh: An Enchanted Place	A. A. Milne	Willie Rushton	04-Jan-80
2541	The Eyes of the Amaryllis: Part 1	Natalie Babbitt	Joanna David	07-Jan-80
2542	The Eyes of the Amaryllis: Part 2	Natalie Babbitt	Joanna David	08-Jan-80
2543	The Eyes of the Amaryllis: Part 3	Natalie Babbitt	Joanna David	09-Jan-80
2544	The Eyes of the Amaryllis: Part 4	Natalie Babbitt	Joanna David	10-Jan-80
2545	The Eyes of the Amaryllis: Part 5	Natalie Babbitt	Joanna David	11-Jan-80
2546	See How They Run: Part 1	Joan Tate	Michael Troughton	14-Jan-80
2547	See How They Run: Part 2	Joan Tate	Michael Troughton	15-Jan-80
2548	See How They Run: Part 3	Joan Tate	Michael Troughton	16-Jan-80
2549	See How They Run: Part 4	Joan Tate	Michael Troughton	17-Jan-80
2550	See How They Run: Part 5	Joan Tate	Michael Troughton	18-Jan-80
2551	Joe Burkinshaw's Progress: Part 1	Geoffrey Kilner	Geoffrey Hinsliff	28-Jan-80
2552	Joe Burkinshaw's Progress: Part 2	Geoffrey Kilner	Geoffrey Hinsliff	29-Jan-80
2553	Joe Burkinshaw's Progress: Part 3	Geoffrey Kilner	Geoffrey Hinsliff	30-Jan-80
2554	Joe Burkinshaw's Progress: Part 4	Geoffrey Kilner	Geoffrey Hinsliff	31-Jan-80
2555	Joe Burkinshaw's Progress: Part 5	Geoffrey Kilner	Geoffrey Hinsliff	01-Feb-80
2556	Mr Stupid	Traditional Oriental Tale	Cyd Hayman	11-Feb-80
2557	The Magic Millstones	Traditional Oriental Tale	Cyd Hayman	12-Feb-80
2558	The Greedy Polecat	Traditional Oriental Tale	Cyd Hayman	13-Feb-80
2559	Tarn and Cam	Traditional Oriental Tale	Cyd Hayman	14-Feb-80
2560	The Moon Child	Traditional Oriental Tale	Cyd Hayman	15-Feb-80
2561	Bogwoppit: Part 1	Ursula Moray Williams	Prunella Scales	18-Feb-80
2562	Bogwoppit: Part 2	Ursula Moray Williams	Prunella Scales	19-Feb-80
2563	Bogwoppit: Part 3	Ursula Moray Williams	Prunella Scales	20-Feb-80
2564	Bogwoppit: Part 4	Ursula Moray Williams	Prunella Scales	21-Feb-80
2565	Bogwoppit: Part 5	Ursula Moray Williams	Prunella Scales	22-Feb-80
2566	The Robbers: Part 1	Nina Bawden	Gemma Jones	25-Feb-80
2567	The Robbers: Part 2	Nina Bawden	Gemma Jones	26-Feb-80
2568	The Robbers: Part 3	Nina Bawden	Gemma Jones	27-Feb-80
2569	The Robbers: Part 4	Nina Bawden	Gemma Jones	28-Feb-80
2570	The Robbers: Part 5	Nina Bawden	Gemma Jones	29-Feb-80
2571	The Weathermakers: Part 1	John Farrimond	Brigit Forsyth	03-Mar-80
2572	The Weathermakers: Part 2	John Farrimond	Brigit Forsyth	04-Mar-80
2573	The Weathermakers: Part 3	John Farrimond	Brigit Forsyth	05-Mar-80
2574	The Weathermakers: Part 4	John Farrimond	Brigit Forsyth	06-Mar-80
2575	The Weathermakers: Part 5	John Farrimond	Brigit Forsyth	07-Mar-80
2576	The Mill House Cat: Part 1 - Oswald Appears	Marjorie-Ann Watts	Jenny Agutter	10-Mar-80
2577	The Mill House Cat: Part 2 - The Well-wisher	Marjorie-Ann Watts	Jenny Agutter	11-Mar-80
2578	The Mill House Cat: Part 3 - The Indian Queen	Marjorie-Ann Watts	Jenny Agutter	12-Mar-80
2579	The Mill House Cat: Part 4 - Oswald's Friend	Marjorie-Ann Watts	Jenny Agutter	13-Mar-80
2580	The Mill House Cat: Part 5 - Oswald to the Rescue	Marjorie-Ann Watts	Jenny Agutter	14-Mar-80
2581	The Runaway: Part 1	Gillian Cross	Paul Copley	17-Mar-80
2582	The Runaway: Part 2	Gillian Cross	Paul Copley	18-Mar-80
2583	The Runaway: Part 3	Gillian Cross	Paul Copley	19-Mar-80
2584	The Runaway: Part 4	Gillian Cross	Paul Copley	20-Mar-80
2585	The Runaway: Part 5	Gillian Cross	Paul Copley	21-Mar-80
2586	The Tale of Peter Rabbit/The Tale of Benjamin Bunny	Beatrix Potter	Sarah Porter	24-Mar-80
2587	The Tale of Jemima Puddle-Duck/The Tale of Jeremy Fisher	Beatrix Potter	Sarah Porter	25-Mar-80
2588	The Tale of the Pie and the Patty-Pan	Beatrix Potter	Sarah Porter	26-Mar-80
2589	The Tale of Tom Kitten/The Tale of Squirrel Nutkin	Beatrix Potter	Sarah Porter	27-Mar-80
2590	The Tale of Mrs Tittle-mouse/The Tale of Mrs Tiggywinkle	Beatrix Potter	Sarah Porter	28-Mar-80
2591	Winnie-the-Pooh: Kanga and Baby Roo Come to the Forest	A. A. Milne	Willie Rushton	04-Apr-80
2592	The Rise and Fall of Jim the Hedgehog	Miles Kington	Instant Sunshine	29-Sep-80
2593	The Carrot Machine	Peter Christie	Instant Sunshine	30-Sep-80
2594	George's Lost Spider	Peter Christie	Instant Sunshine	01-Oct-80
2595	Himbo Hardy and the French Frog Fiasco	David Barlow	Instant Sunshine	02-Oct-80
2596	Stealing Cars	Miles Kington	Instant Sunshine	03-Oct-80
2597	Chase Through the Night: Part 1	Max Fatchen	John Gregg	06-Oct-80
2598	Chase Through the Night: Part 2	Max Fatchen	John Gregg	07-Oct-80
2599	Chase Through the Night: Part 3	Max Fatchen	John Gregg	08-Oct-80
2600	Chase Through the Night: Part 4	Max Fatchen	John Gregg	09-Oct-80
2601	Chase Through the Night: Part 5	Max Fatchen	John Gregg	10-Oct-80
2602	The Great King Solomon: The Charitable Woman	Pearl Binder	Eleanor Bron	13-Oct-80
2603	The Great King Solomon: King Solomon and the Bee	Pearl Binder	Eleanor Bron	14-Oct-80
2604	The Great King Solomon: The Butterfly that Stamped	Pearl Binder	Eleanor Bron	15-Oct-80
2605	The Great King Solomon: King Solomon's Daughter	Pearl Binder	Eleanor Bron	16-Oct-80
2606	The Great King Solomon: The Beggar King	Pearl Binder	Eleanor Bron	17-Oct-80
2607	Count Bakwerdz on the Carpet	Norman Hunter	Kenneth Williams	20-Oct-80
2608	Count Bakwerdz on the Carpet: A Slight Touch of Disaster	Norman Hunter	Kenneth Williams	21-Oct-80
2609	Count Bakwerdz on the Carpet: The King's Birthday Present	Norman Hunter	Kenneth Williams	22-Oct-80
2610	Count Bakwerdz on the Carpet: An Unlikely Picnic	Norman Hunter	Kenneth Williams	23-Oct-80
2611	Count Bakwerdz on the Carpet: Direful Dragonry	Norman Hunter	Kenneth Williams	24-Oct-80
2612	The Good Little Devil: Part 1 - Cider Wine Ale	Ann Lawrence	Maurice Denham	27-Oct-80
2613	The Good Little Devil: Part 2 - Thingummy	Ann Lawrence	Maurice Denham	28-Oct-80
2614	The Good Little Devil: Part 3 - Changes	Ann Lawrence	Maurice Denham	29-Oct-80
2615	The Good Little Devil: Part 4 - Horse and Hattock	Ann Lawrence	Maurice Denham	30-Oct-80
2616	The Good Little Devil: Part 5 - Christmas	Ann Lawrence	Maurice Denham	31-Oct-80
2617	The Snake Whistle: Part 1 - Belas Knap	Margaret Greaves	Christopher Blake	10-Nov-80
2618	The Snake Whistle: Part 2 - The Servant of the Snake	Margaret Greaves	Christopher Blake	11-Nov-80
2619	The Snake Whistle: Part 3 - Master of Magic	Margaret Greaves	Christopher Blake	12-Nov-80
2620	The Snake Whistle: Part 4 - Challenge	Margaret Greaves	Christopher Blake	13-Nov-80
2621	The Snake Whistle: Part 5 - The Master of Men	Margaret Greaves	Christopher Blake	14-Nov-80
2622	Celtic Tales: Mother Brigid's Cloak of Darkness	Jenny Nimmo	T. P. McKenna	19-Nov-80
2623	Celtic Tales: The Changelings	Jenny Nimmo	T. P. McKenna	26-Nov-80
2624	Celtic Tales: The Witches and the Singing Mice	Jenny Nimmo	T. P. McKenna	03-Dec-80
2625	Celtic Tales: The Faerie Fort	Jenny Nimmo	T. P. McKenna	10-Dec-80
2626	Celtic Tales: The Dragon's Child	Jenny Nimmo	T. P. McKenna	17-Dec-80
2627	A Pair of Sinners	Allan Ahlberg and John Lawrence	Denis Quilley	22-Dec-80
2628	The Church Mice at Christmas	Graham Oakley	Cyril Luckham	23-Dec-80
2629	The Tailor of Gloucester	Beatrix Potter	Judi Dench	24-Dec-80
2630	The Mystery of Mr Jones's Disappearing Taxi: Part 1 - Disappearances	Joan Aiken	Bernard Cribbins	29-Dec-80
2631	The Mystery of Mr Jones's Disappearing Taxi: Part 2 - The Plot Thickens	Joan Aiken	Bernard Cribbins	30-Dec-80
2632	The Mystery of Mr Jones's Disappearing Taxi: Part 3 - The Rescue	Joan Aiken	Bernard Cribbins	31-Dec-80

== 1981 ==
Episode	Story	Written by	Read by	Original air date
2633	Mortimer's Portrait on Glass: Part 1 - Black Feakle's Bog	Joan Aiken	Bernard Cribbins	01-Jan-81
2634	Mortimer's Portrait on Glass: Part 2 - A Shattering Experience	Joan Aiken	Bernard Cribbins	02-Jan-81
2635	Grimm Grange: Part 1	William Browning	Colin Jeavons	05-Jan-81
2636	Grimm Grange: Part 2	William Browning	Colin Jeavons	06-Jan-81
2637	Grimm Grange: Part 3	William Browning	Colin Jeavons	07-Jan-81
2638	Grimm Grange: Part 4	William Browning	Colin Jeavons	08-Jan-81
2639	Grimm Grange: Part 5	William Browning	Colin Jeavons	09-Jan-81
2640	Jonny Briggs and the Great Razzle-Dazzle: Part 1 - The Discovery	Joan Eadington	Bernard Holley	12-Jan-81
2641	Jonny Briggs and the Great Razzle-Dazzle: Part 2 - Sore Throat	Joan Eadington	Bernard Holley	13-Jan-81
2642	Jonny Briggs and the Great Razzle-Dazzle: Part 3 - The Note	Joan Eadington	Bernard Holley	14-Jan-81
2643	Jonny Briggs and the Great Razzle-Dazzle: Part 4 - Duck Trouble	Joan Eadington	Bernard Holley	15-Jan-81
2644	Jonny Briggs and the Great Razzle-Dazzle: Part 5 - The Protest	Joan Eadington	Bernard Holley	16-Jan-81
2645	A Donkey called Paloma: Part 1	Nina Warner Hooke	Pippa Guard	19-Jan-81
2646	A Donkey called Paloma: Part 2	Nina Warner Hooke	Pippa Guard	20-Jan-81
2647	A Donkey called Paloma: Part 3	Nina Warner Hooke	Pippa Guard	21-Jan-81
2648	A Donkey called Paloma: Part 4	Nina Warner Hooke	Pippa Guard	22-Jan-81
2649	A Donkey called Paloma: Part 5	Nina Warner Hooke	Pippa Guard	23-Jan-81
2650	By the Shores of Silver Lake: Part 1 - An Unexpected Visitor	Laura Ingalls Wilder	Joanna David	26-Jan-81
2651	By the Shores of Silver Lake: Part 2 - The West Begins	Laura Ingalls Wilder	Joanna David	27-Jan-81
2652	By the Shores of Silver Lake: Part 3 - Wolves on Silver Lake	Laura Ingalls Wilder	Joanna David	28-Jan-81
2653	By the Shores of Silver Lake: Part 4 - Happy Winter Days	Laura Ingalls Wilder	Joanna David	29-Jan-81
2654	By the Shores of Silver Lake: Part 5 - The Shanty on the Claim	Laura Ingalls Wilder	Joanna David	30-Jan-81
2655	The Indian in the Cupboard: Part 1 - Birthday Presents	Lynne Reid Banks	Martin Jarvis	02-Feb-81
2656	The Indian in the Cupboard: Part 2 - More Magic	Lynne Reid Banks	Martin Jarvis	03-Feb-81
2657	The Indian in the Cupboard: Part 3 -Trouble at School	Lynne Reid Banks	Martin Jarvis	04-Feb-81
2658	The Indian in the Cupboard: Part 4 - The Lost Key	Lynne Reid Banks	Martin Jarvis	05-Feb-81
2659	The Indian in the Cupboard: Part 5 - The Feast	Lynne Reid Banks	Martin Jarvis	06-Feb-81
2660	The Little Bookroom: The Little Dressmaker	Eleanor Farjeon	Sheila Hancock	09-Feb-81
2661	The Little Bookroom: The Kind Farmer	Eleanor Farjeon	Sheila Hancock	10-Feb-81
2662	The Little Bookroom: San Fairy Ann	Eleanor Farjeon	Sheila Hancock	11-Feb-81
2663	The Little Bookroom: The Connemara Donkey	Eleanor Farjeon	Sheila Hancock	12-Feb-81
2664	The Little Bookroom: Pennyworth	Eleanor Farjeon	Sheila Hancock	13-Feb-81
2665	The Bears Upstairs: Part 1	Dorothy Haas	Julie Dawn Cole	16-Feb-81
2666	The Bears Upstairs: Part 2	Dorothy Haas	Julie Dawn Cole	17-Feb-81
2667	The Bears Upstairs: Part 3	Dorothy Haas	Julie Dawn Cole	18-Feb-81
2668	The Bears Upstairs: Part 4	Dorothy Haas	Julie Dawn Cole	19-Feb-81
2669	The Bears Upstairs: Part 5	Dorothy Haas	Julie Dawn Cole	20-Feb-81
2670	The Faithless Lollybird and Other Stories: The Faithless Lollybird	Joan Aiken	Ronald Pickup	23-Feb-81
2671	The Faithless Lollybird and Other Stories: Moonshine in the Mustard Pot	Joan Aiken	Ronald Pickup	24-Feb-81
2672	The Faithless Lollybird and Other Stories: Memory	Joan Aiken	Ronald Pickup	25-Feb-81
2673	The Faithless Lollybird and Other Stories: The Night the Stars were Gone	Joan Aiken	Ronald Pickup	26-Feb-81
2674	The Faithless Lollybird and Other Stories: Crusader's Toby	Joan Aiken	Ronald Pickup	27-Feb-81
2675	A Strong and Willing Girl: Part 1 - The Vicarage Steps	Dorothy Edwards	Sherrie Hewson	02-Mar-81
2676	A Strong and Willing Girl: Part 2 - A Bit of High Life	Dorothy Edwards	Sherrie Hewson	03-Mar-81
2677	A Strong and Willing Girl: Part 3 - The Boys Who Should Have Known Better	Dorothy Edwards	Sherrie Hewson	04-Mar-81
2678	A Strong and Willing Girl: Part 4 - Treats	Dorothy Edwards	Sherrie Hewson	05-Mar-81
2679	A Strong and Willing Girl: Part 5 - The Tale of the Useful Boy	Dorothy Edwards	Sherrie Hewson	06-Mar-81
2680	A Walk in Wolf Wood: Part 1 - The Cottage in the Forest	Mary Stewart	John Duttine	09-Mar-81
2681	A Walk in Wolf Wood: Part 2 - Explanations and Plans	Mary Stewart	John Duttine	10-Mar-81
2682	A Walk in Wolf Wood: Part 3 - In the Castle	Mary Stewart	John Duttine	11-Mar-81
2683	A Walk in Wolf Wood: Part 4 - The Enchanter	Mary Stewart	John Duttine	12-Mar-81
2684	A Walk in Wolf Wood: Part 5 - Transformations	Mary Stewart	John Duttine	13-Mar-81
2685	Shadow at Applegarth: Part 1 - Speech Day	Mary Cockett	Ann Morrish	16-Mar-81
2686	Shadow at Applegarth: Part 2 - The Manor Pool	Mary Cockett	Ann Morrish	17-Mar-81
2687	Shadow at Applegarth: Part 3 - The Fern Kingdom	Mary Cockett	Ann Morrish	18-Mar-81
2688	Shadow at Applegarth: Part 4 - Tabletomb	Mary Cockett	Ann Morrish	19-Mar-81
2689	Shadow at Applegarth: Part 5 - The Tewer	Mary Cockett	Ann Morrish	20-Mar-81
2690	Super Gran: Part 1 - Gran and Super Gran	Forrest Wilson	Sheila Steafel	30-Mar-81
2691	Super Gran: Part 2 - The Bank Raid	Forrest Wilson	Sheila Steafel	31-Mar-81
2692	Super Gran: Part 3 - The Kidnap	Forrest Wilson	Sheila Steafel	01-Apr-81
2693	Super Gran: Part 4 - Super Gran Meets the Inventor	Forrest Wilson	Sheila Steafel	02-Apr-81
2694	Super Gran: Part 5 - The Final Battle	Forrest Wilson	Sheila Steafel	03-Apr-81
2695	The Railway Children: Part 1	E. Nesbit	Jane Asher	05-Oct-81
2696	The Railway Children: Part 2	E. Nesbit	Jane Asher	06-Oct-81
2697	The Railway Children: Part 3	E. Nesbit	Jane Asher	07-Oct-81
2698	The Railway Children: Part 4	E. Nesbit	Jane Asher	08-Oct-81
2699	The Railway Children: Part 5	E. Nesbit	Jane Asher	09-Oct-81
2700	Agaton Sax and Lispington's Grandfather Clock: Part 1 - Double Attack	Nils-Olof Franzén	Kenneth Williams	12-Oct-81
2701	Agaton Sax and Lispington's Grandfather Clock: Part 2 - The Crooks Take a Prisoner	Nils-Olof Franzén	Kenneth Williams	13-Oct-81
2702	Agaton Sax and Lispington's Grandfather Clock: Part 3 - The Light Machine	Nils-Olof Franzén	Kenneth Williams	14-Oct-81
2703	Agaton Sax and Lispington's Grandfather Clock: Part 4 - Another Agaton Sax?	Nils-Olof Franzén	Kenneth Williams	15-Oct-81
2704	Agaton Sax and Lispington's Grandfather Clock: Part 5 - The Chase is On	Nils-Olof Franzén	Kenneth Williams	16-Oct-81
2705	The Black Horn: Part 1 - The Horn	Clare Cooper	Philip Madoc	19-Oct-81
2706	The Black Horn: Part 2 - The Sunlit Islands	Clare Cooper	Philip Madoc	20-Oct-81
2707	The Black Horn: Part 3 - The Cold Blue Stone	Clare Cooper	Philip Madoc	21-Oct-81
2708	The Black Horn: Part 4 - The Spell Begins to Break	Clare Cooper	Philip Madoc	22-Oct-81
2709	The Black Horn: Part 5 - A Home for the Unicorn	Clare Cooper	Philip Madoc	23-Oct-81
2710	Mr McFadden's Hallowe'en: Part 1	Rumer Godden	Hannah Gordon	26-Oct-81
2711	Mr McFadden's Hallowe'en: Part 2	Rumer Godden	Hannah Gordon	27-Oct-81
2712	Mr McFadden's Hallowe'en: Part 3	Rumer Godden	Hannah Gordon	28-Oct-81
2713	Mr McFadden's Hallowe'en: Part 4	Rumer Godden	Hannah Gordon	29-Oct-81
2714	Mr McFadden's Hallowe'en: Part 5	Rumer Godden	Hannah Gordon	30-Oct-81
2715	The Miller's Boy: Part 1 - Boy Alone	Barbara Willard	Christopher Guard	02-Nov-81
2716	The Miller's Boy: Part 2 - Boy on the Run	Barbara Willard	Christopher Guard	03-Nov-81
2717	The Miller's Boy: Part 3 - Forest Ways	Barbara Willard	Christopher Guard	04-Nov-81
2718	The Miller's Boy: Part 4 - One for Lucifer, Seen in the Dark	Barbara Willard	Christopher Guard	05-Nov-81
2719	The Miller's Boy: Part 5 - To Keep or Give Away	Barbara Willard	Christopher Guard	06-Nov-81
2720	The Practical Princess and Other Liberating Fairy Tales: Petronella	Jay Williams	Tom Conti	10-Nov-81
2721	The Practical Princess and Other Liberating Fairy Tales: Philbert The Fearful	Jay Williams	Tom Conti	11-Nov-81
2722	The Practical Princess and Other Liberating Fairy Tales: Stupid Marco	Jay Williams	Tom Conti	12-Nov-81
2723	The Practical Princess and Other Liberating Fairy Tales: Forgetful Fred	Jay Williams	Tom Conti	13-Nov-81
2724	Emmy: Part 1	Ruth Boswell	Hayley Mills	16-Nov-81
2725	Emmy: Part 2	Ruth Boswell	Hayley Mills	17-Nov-81
2726	Emmy: Part 3	Ruth Boswell	Hayley Mills	18-Nov-81
2727	Emmy: Part 4	Ruth Boswell	Hayley Mills	19-Nov-81
2728	Emmy: Part 5	Ruth Boswell	Hayley Mills	20-Nov-81
2729	David in Silence: Part 1 - Smashed to Pieces	Veronica Robinson	David Hargreaves	23-Nov-81
2730	David in Silence: Part 2 - Faces in the Tunnel	Veronica Robinson	David Hargreaves	24-Nov-81
2731	David in Silence: Part 3 - The Canal Rafts	Veronica Robinson	David Hargreaves	25-Nov-81
2732	What Difference Does it Make, Danny?: Part 1 - Mr Masterson's Decision	Helen Young	Martin Jarvis	26-Nov-81
2733	What Difference Does it Make, Danny?: Part 2 - Danny's Saving	Helen Young	Martin Jarvis	27-Nov-81
2734	The Good Master: Part 1 - Cousin Kate from Budapest	Kate Seredy	Emily Richard	30-Nov-81
2735	The Good Master: Part 2 - The Riding Lesson	Kate Seredy	Emily Richard	01-Dec-81
2736	The Good Master: Part 3 - The Round-up	Kate Seredy	Emily Richard	02-Dec-81
2737	The Good Master: Part 4 - Strange Waters	Kate Seredy	Emily Richard	03-Dec-81
2738	The Good Master: Part 5 - Mikulas, Bearer of Gifts	Kate Seredy	Emily Richard	04-Dec-81
2739	The Mona Lisa Mystery: Part 1 - Paris, Here We Come	Pat Hutchins	Maureen Lipman	07-Dec-81
2740	The Mona Lisa Mystery: Part 2 - Further Complications	Pat Hutchins	Maureen Lipman	08-Dec-81
2741	The Mona Lisa Mystery: Part 3 - The Eiffel Tower and the Mona Lisa	Pat Hutchins	Maureen Lipman	09-Dec-81
2742	The Mona Lisa Mystery: Part 4 - Suspicions	Pat Hutchins	Maureen Lipman	10-Dec-81
2743	The Mona Lisa Mystery: Part 5 - Guests of Honour	Pat Hutchins	Maureen Lipman	11-Dec-81
2744	The Snow Queen: The First and Second Stories	Hans Christian Andersen	Cheryl Campbell	21-Dec-81
2745	The Snow Queen: The Third Story	Hans Christian Andersen	Cheryl Campbell	22-Dec-81
2746	The Snow Queen: The Fourth and Fifth Stories	Hans Christian Andersen	Cheryl Campbell	23-Dec-81
2747	The Snow Queen: The Sixth and Seventh Stories	Hans Christian Andersen	Cheryl Campbell	24-Dec-81
2748	The Discovery of the Source of the M1	Miles Kington	Instant Sunshine	29-Dec-81
2749	The Don't-know-whether Forecaster	Alan Maryon-Davis	Instant Sunshine	30-Dec-81
2750	The Duel	Miles Kington	Instant Sunshine	31-Dec-81

== 1982 ==
Episode	Story	Written by	Read by	Original air date
2751	The Adventures of Coneli: Part 1 - The Taming Of Shumac	Edith Brill	Brendan Price	04-Jan-82
2752	The Adventures of Coneli: Part 2 - The Wooden Sword	Edith Brill	Brendan Price	05-Jan-82
2753	The Adventures of Coneli: Part 3 - The Affair of the Giants	Edith Brill	Brendan Price	06-Jan-82
2754	The Adventures of Coneli: Part 4 - The Last of the Druid	Edith Brill	Brendan Price	07-Jan-82
2755	Jeffy, the Burglar's Cat: Part 1 - The Awful Truth about Miss Amity	Ursula Moray Williams	Rodney Bewes	11-Jan-82
2756	Jeffy, the Burglar's Cat: Part 2 - Partners in Crime	Ursula Moray Williams	Rodney Bewes	12-Jan-82
2757	Jeffy, the Burglar's Cat: Part 3 - Terror on the High Seas	Ursula Moray Williams	Rodney Bewes	13-Jan-82
2758	Jeffy, the Burglar's Cat: Part 4 - Return to the Tropics	Ursula Moray Williams	Rodney Bewes	14-Jan-82
2759	The Ordinary Princess: Part 1 - The Christening	M. M. Kaye	Joanna David	18-Jan-82
2760	The Ordinary Princess: Part 2 - Amy	M. M. Kaye	Joanna David	19-Jan-82
2761	The Ordinary Princess: Part 3 - Second Thursdays	M. M. Kaye	Joanna David	20-Jan-82
2762	The Ordinary Princess: Part 4 - Lavender's Blue	M. M. Kaye	Joanna David	21-Jan-82
2763	Bravo Baltasar: Part 1	Jo Rice	Jan Francis	25-Jan-82
2764	Bravo Baltasar: Part 2	Jo Rice	Jan Francis	26-Jan-82
2765	Bravo Baltasar: Part 3	Jo Rice	Jan Francis	27-Jan-82
2766	Bravo Baltasar: Part 4	Jo Rice	Jan Francis	28-Jan-82
2767	The Eggbox Brontosaurus: Part 1 - Two Down, 249,998 to Go	Michael Denton	Tony Aitken	01-Feb-82
2768	The Eggbox Brontosaurus: Part 2 - Questing for Beginners	Michael Denton	Tony Aitken	02-Feb-82
2769	The Eggbox Brontosaurus: Part 3 - In Search of the Lost Page	Michael Denton	Tony Aitken	03-Feb-82
2770	The Eggbox Brontosaurus: Part 4 - The Egg-citing End	Michael Denton	Tony Aitken	04-Feb-82
2771	The Secret Garden: Part 1 - Mistress Mary Quite Contrary '	Frances Hodgson Burnett	Rosalind Ayres	08-Feb-82
2772	The Secret Garden: Part 2 - Dickon	Frances Hodgson Burnett	Rosalind Ayres	09-Feb-82
2773	The Secret Garden: Part 3 - I am Colin	Frances Hodgson Burnett	Rosalind Ayres	10-Feb-82
2774	The Secret Garden: Part 4 - Ben Weatherstaff	Frances Hodgson Burnett	Rosalind Ayres	11-Feb-82
2775	The Secret Garden: Part 5 - Magic	Frances Hodgson Burnett	Rosalind Ayres	12-Feb-82
2776	Jonny Briggs and the Giant Cave: Part 1 - The Big Plan	Joan Eadington	Bernard Holley	01-Mar-82
2777	Jonny Briggs and the Giant Cave: Part 2 - Late for School	Joan Eadington	Bernard Holley	02-Mar-82
2778	Jonny Briggs and the Giant Cave: Part 3 - Tipped Out	Joan Eadington	Bernard Holley	03-Mar-82
2779	Jonny Briggs and the Giant Cave: Part 4 - The New life	Joan Eadington	Bernard Holley	04-Mar-82
2780	Jonny Briggs and the Giant Cave: Part 5 - The Great Exhibition	Joan Eadington	Bernard Holley	05-Mar-82
2781	The Multiplying Glass: Part 1 - The Antique Shop	Ann Phillips	Ann Morrish	08-Mar-82
2782	The Multiplying Glass: Part 2 - Claudia	Ann Phillips	Ann Morrish	09-Mar-82
2783	The Multiplying Glass: Part 3 - Rehearsing	Ann Phillips	Ann Morrish	10-Mar-82
2784	The Multiplying Glass: Part 4 - The Grotto	Ann Phillips	Ann Morrish	11-Mar-82
2785	The Multiplying Glass: Part 5 - Goodbye, Liz	Ann Phillips	Ann Morrish	12-Mar-82
2786	The Church Mice at Bay	Graham Oakley	Cyril Luckham	15-Mar-82
2787	Mr. Potter's Pigeon	Patrick Kinmonth	Cyril Luckham	16-Mar-82
2788	Panda's Puzzle and his Voyage of Discovery/Panda and the Odd Lion	Michael Foreman	Cyril Luckham	17-Mar-82
2789	And Miss Carter Wore Pink: Scenes from an Edwardian Childhood	Helen Bradley	Thora Hird	18-Mar-82
2790	The Seven Sparrows and the Motor Car Picnic	Joan Hickson	Thora Hird	19-Mar-82
2791	How Green You Are!: Part 1 - The First Day	Berlie Doherty	Nerys Hughes	22-Mar-82
2792	How Green You Are!: Part 2 - The White Queen	Berlie Doherty	Nerys Hughes	23-Mar-82
2793	How Green You Are!: Part 3 - Weird George	Berlie Doherty	Nerys Hughes	24-Mar-82
2794	How Green You Are!: Part 4 - Toad	Berlie Doherty	Nerys Hughes	25-Mar-82
2795	How Green You Are!: Part 5 - Seagulls and Wedding Bells	Berlie Doherty	Nerys Hughes	26-Mar-82
2796	Polish Folk Tales: The Winged Hussar	Traditional Polish Tale	Rula Lenska	29-Mar-82
2797	Polish Folk Tales: The Three Walnuts	Traditional Polish Tale	Rula Lenska	30-Mar-82
2798	Polish Folk Tales: The Lake of Lilies	Traditional Polish Tale	Rula Lenska	31-Mar-82
2799	Polish Folk Tales: Gavel and King Hobnail	Traditional Polish Tale	Rula Lenska	01-Apr-82
2800	Polish Folk Tales: The Trumpeter of Krakov	Traditional Polish Tale	Rula Lenska	02-Apr-82
2801	The Sponsored Fish	Peter Christie	Instant Sunshine	26-Jul-82
2802	Starstormers: Part 1	Nicholas Fisk		11-Oct-82
2803	Starstormers: Part 2	Nicholas Fisk		12-Oct-82
2804	Starstormers: Part 3	Nicholas Fisk		13-Oct-82
2805	Starstormers: Part 4	Nicholas Fisk		14-Oct-82
2806	Starstormers: Part 5	Nicholas Fisk		15-Oct-82
2807	Littlenose the Marksman	John Grant		18-Oct-82
2808	Littlenose the Artist	John Grant		19-Oct-82
2809	Littlenose the Horseman	John Grant		20-Oct-82
2810	Littlenose the Life-saver	John Grant		21-Oct-82
2811	Littlenose's Hibernation	John Grant		22-Oct-82
2812	Gobbolino, the Witch's Cat: Part 1 - Gobbolino in Disgrace	Ursula Moray Williams	Kathryn Pogson	25-Oct-82
2813	Gobbolino, the Witch's Cat: Part 2 - Gobbolino Joins the orphans	Ursula Moray Williams	Kathryn Pogson	26-Oct-82
2814	Gobbolino, the Witch's Cat: Part 3 - Gobbolino Joins High Society	Ursula Moray Williams	Kathryn Pogson	27-Oct-82
2815	Gobbolino, the Witch's Cat: Part 4 - Gobbolino the Performing Cat	Ursula Moray Williams	Kathryn Pogson	28-Oct-82
2816	Gobbolino, the Witch's Cat: Part 5 - Gobbolino the Kitchen Cat	Ursula Moray Williams	Kathryn Pogson	29-Oct-82
2817	Rumbelow Road: Part 1 - Accidental Meeting	Gabriel Alington	Robert Swann	01-Nov-82
2818	Rumbelow Road: Part 2 - The Mullion Jug	Gabriel Alington	Robert Swann	02-Nov-82
2819	Rumbelow Road: Part 3 - The Repair Shop	Gabriel Alington	Robert Swann	03-Nov-82
2820	Rumbelow Road: Part 4 - The Patchwork Bowl	Gabriel Alington	Robert Swann	04-Nov-82
2821	Rumbelow Road: Part 5 - Doodle Bug	Gabriel Alington	Robert Swann	05-Nov-82
2822	Writing Competition Winners: Travel	Stories written by Children	Tony Aitken/Wendy Padbury	08-Nov-82
2823	Writing Competition Winners: Food	Stories written by Children	Tony Aitken/Pam Ayres	09-Nov-82
2824	Writing Competition Winners: Animals	Stories written by Children	Tony Aitken/Jonny Morris	10-Nov-82
2825	Writing Competition Winners: Magic and Mystery	Stories written by Children	Tony Aitken/Maureen Lipman	11-Nov-82
2826	Writing Competition Winners: Sport	Stories written by Children	Tony Aitken/Angela Bruce	12-Nov-82
2827	Knight's Fee: Part 1	Rosemary Sutcliff	Benedict Taylor	15-Nov-82
2828	Knight's Fee: Part 2	Rosemary Sutcliff	Benedict Taylor	16-Nov-82
2829	Knight's Fee: Part 3	Rosemary Sutcliff	Benedict Taylor	17-Nov-82
2830	Knight's Fee: Part 4	Rosemary Sutcliff	Benedict Taylor	18-Nov-82
2831	Knight's Fee: Part 5	Rosemary Sutcliff	Benedict Taylor	19-Nov-82
2832	The Revenge of Samuel Stokes: Part 1	Penelope Lively	Ronald Pickup	22-Nov-82
2833	The Revenge of Samuel Stokes: Part 2	Penelope Lively	Ronald Pickup	23-Nov-82
2834	The Revenge of Samuel Stokes: Part 3	Penelope Lively	Ronald Pickup	24-Nov-82
2835	The Revenge of Samuel Stokes: Part 4	Penelope Lively	Ronald Pickup	25-Nov-82
2836	The Revenge of Samuel Stokes: Part 5	Penelope Lively	Ronald Pickup	26-Nov-82
2837	White Boots: Part 1	Noel Streatfeild	Joanna David	29-Nov-82
2838	White Boots: Part 2	Noel Streatfeild	Joanna David	30-Nov-82
2839	White Boots: Part 3	Noel Streatfeild	Joanna David	01-Dec-82
2840	White Boots: Part 4	Noel Streatfeild	Joanna David	02-Dec-82
2841	White Boots: Part 5	Noel Streatfeild	Joanna David	03-Dec-82
2842	The Wind in the Willows: Part 1 - The River Bank	Kenneth Grahame	Bernard Cribbins	06-Dec-82
2843	The Wind in the Willows: Part 2 - The Open Road	Kenneth Grahame	Bernard Cribbins	07-Dec-82
2844	The Wind in the Willows: Part 3 - The Wild Wood	Kenneth Grahame	Bernard Cribbins	08-Dec-82
2845	The Wind in the Willows: Part 4 - Mr. Toad	Kenneth Grahame	Bernard Cribbins	09-Dec-82
2846	The Wind in the Willows: Part 5 - The Return of Ulysses	Kenneth Grahame	Bernard Cribbins	10-Dec-82
2847	The Wolves of Willoughby Chase: Part 1	Joan Aiken	Jane Carr	13-Dec-82
2848	The Wolves of Willoughby Chase: Part 2	Joan Aiken	Jane Carr	14-Dec-82
2849	The Wolves of Willoughby Chase: Part 3	Joan Aiken	Jane Carr	15-Dec-82
2850	The Wolves of Willoughby Chase: Part 4	Joan Aiken	Jane Carr	16-Dec-82
2851	The Wolves of Willoughby Chase: Part 5	Joan Aiken	Jane Carr	17-Dec-82
2852	Ludmila: Part 1	Paul Gallico	Jeremy Irons	20-Dec-82
2853	Ludmila: Part 2	Paul Gallico	Jeremy Irons	21-Dec-82
2854	Snowflake	Paul Gallico	Jeremy Irons	22-Dec-82
2855	The Small Miracle: Part 1	Paul Gallico	Jeremy Irons	23-Dec-82
2856	The Small Miracle: Part 2	Paul Gallico	Jeremy Irons	24-Dec-82
2857	Puss in Boots	Traditional Italian tale	Cherie Lunghi	29-Dec-82
2858	Jack and the Beanstalk	Traditional English tale	Cherie Lunghi	30-Dec-82
2859	Cinderella	Brothers Grimm	Cherie Lunghi	31-Dec-82

== 1983 ==
Episode	Story	Written by	Read by	Original air date
2860	The Practical Princess and Other Liberating Fairy Tales: The Practical Princess (Note: Episode originally scheduled for 9 November 1981. Episode replaced with live showing of the return of the Space Shuttle from a mission.)	Jay Williams	Tom Conti	06-Jan-83
2861	The Dangerous Journey: Part 1	Elizabeth Renier	Andrew Burt	10-Jan-83
2862	The Dangerous Journey: Part 2	Elizabeth Renier	Andrew Burt	11-Jan-83
2863	The Lightkeepers: Part 1	Elizabeth Renier	Andrew Burt	12-Jan-83
2864	The Lightkeepers: Part 2	Elizabeth Renier	Andrew Burt	13-Jan-83
2865	Stories, songs and poems chosen by Willie Rushton	Various	Judi Dench/Martin Jarvis/Willie Rushton	14-Jan-83
2866	Indian Folk Tales: Dhola and Maru - Part 1	Ilay Cooper	Indira Joshi	17-Jan-83
2867	Indian Folk Tales: Dhola and Maru - Part 2	Ilay Cooper	Indira Joshi	18-Jan-83
2868	Indian Folk Tales: Binjo and Sayni - Part 1	Ilay Cooper	Indira Joshi	19-Jan-83
2869	Indian Folk Tales: Binjo and Sayni - Part 2	Ilay Cooper	Indira Joshi	20-Jan-83
2870	Stories, songs and poems chosen by Judi Dench	Various	Judi Dench/Martin Jarvis/Willie Rushton	21-Jan-83
2871	The Spuddy: Part 1 - Left Alone	Lillian Beckwith	Donald Douglas	24-Jan-83
2872	The Spuddy: Part 2 - Inseparable Friends	Lillian Beckwith	Donald Douglas	25-Jan-83
2873	The Spuddy: Part 3 - Ship's Dog	Lillian Beckwith	Donald Douglas	26-Jan-83
2874	The Spuddy: Part 4 - Fateful Trip	Lillian Beckwith	Donald Douglas	27-Jan-83
2875	Stories, songs and poems chosen by Martin Jarvis	Various	Judi Dench/Martin Jarvis/Willie Rushton	28-Jan-83
2876	The Wheel on the School: Part 1	Meindert DeJong	Peter Settelen	31-Jan-83
2877	The Wheel on the School: Part 2	Meindert DeJong	Peter Settelen	01-Feb-83
2878	The Wheel on the School: Part 3	Meindert DeJong	Peter Settelen	02-Feb-83
2879	The Wheel on the School: Part 4	Meindert DeJong	Peter Settelen	03-Feb-83
2880	The Wheel on the School: Part 5	Meindert DeJong	Peter Settelen	04-Feb-83
2881	The Sylvia Game: Part 1	Vivien Alcock	Jane Asher	07-Feb-83
2882	The Sylvia Game: Part 2	Vivien Alcock	Jane Asher	08-Feb-83
2883	The Sylvia Game: Part 3	Vivien Alcock	Jane Asher	09-Feb-83
2884	The Sylvia Game: Part 4	Vivien Alcock	Jane Asher	10-Feb-83
2885	The Sylvia Game: Part 5	Vivien Alcock	Jane Asher	11-Feb-83
2886	The Great Toytown Mystery	S.G. Hulme Beaman	Willie Rushton	14-Feb-83
2887	Cap of Rushes	Traditional English tale	Jan Francis	15-Feb-83
2888	Jennings and Darbishire	Anthony Buckeridge	Willie Rushton	16-Feb-83
2889	Five Children and It	E. Nesbit	Jan Francis	17-Feb-83
2890	Winnie the Pooh	A. A. Milne	Willie Rushton	18-Feb-83
2891	Jonny Briggs and the Galloping Wedding: Part 1 - The Unlucky Horseshoe	Joan Eadington	Bernard Holley	21-Feb-83
2892	Jonny Briggs and the Galloping Wedding: Part 2 - Disappearing Acts	Joan Eadington	Bernard Holley	22-Feb-83
2893	Jonny Briggs and the Galloping Wedding: Part 3 - Rita's Revenge	Joan Eadington	Bernard Holley	23-Feb-83
2894	Jonny Briggs and the Galloping Wedding: Part 4 - An Awful Row	Joan Eadington	Bernard Holley	24-Feb-83
2895	Jonny Briggs and the Galloping Wedding: Part 5 - The Wedding	Joan Eadington	Bernard Holley	25-Feb-83
2896	The Borrowers: Part 1	Mary Norton	Julie Covington	28-Feb-83
2897	The Borrowers: Part 2	Mary Norton	Julie Covington	01-Mar-83
2898	The Borrowers: Part 3	Mary Norton	Julie Covington	02-Mar-83
2899	The Borrowers: Part 4	Mary Norton	Julie Covington	03-Mar-83
2900	The Borrowers: Part 5	Mary Norton	Julie Covington	04-Mar-83
2901	The Animal, the Vegetable and John D. Jones: Part 1	Betsy Byars	Jana Shelden	07-Mar-83
2902	The Animal, the Vegetable and John D. Jones: Part 2	Betsy Byars	Jana Shelden	08-Mar-83
2903	The Animal, the Vegetable and John D. Jones: Part 3	Betsy Byars	Jana Shelden	09-Mar-83
2904	The Animal, the Vegetable and John D. Jones: Part 4	Betsy Byars	Jana Shelden	10-Mar-83
2905	The Animal, the Vegetable and John D. Jones: Part 5	Betsy Byars	Jana Shelden	11-Mar-83
2906	The Phantom Tollbooth: Part 1 - Just Killing Time	Norton Juster	Hywel Bennett	14-Mar-83
2907	The Phantom Tollbooth: Part 2 - A Short Shrift Sentence	Norton Juster	Hywel Bennett	15-Mar-83
2908	The Phantom Tollbooth: Part 3 - Down with Silence!	Norton Juster	Hywel Bennett	16-Mar-83
2909	The Phantom Tollbooth: Part 4 - It's mine. No it isn't	Norton Juster	Hywel Bennett	17-Mar-83
2910	The Phantom Tollbooth: Part 5 - Whatever Goes Up Must Come Down	Norton Juster	Hywel Bennett	18-Mar-83
2911	Dragon Stories: The Dragon of Yang-Wong	Ann Jungman	David Yip	21-Mar-83
2912	Dragon Stories: The Dragon Becomes a Pet	Ann Jungman	David Yip	22-Mar-83
2913	Dragon Stories: The Dragon Joins the Army	Ann Jungman	David Yip	23-Mar-83
2914	Dragon Stories: The Dragon Falls in Love	Ann Jungman	David Yip	24-Mar-83
2915	Dragon Stories: The Dragon Becomes Mayor	Ann Jungman	David Yip	25-Mar-83
2916	Sneeze and Be Slain and Other Incredible Stories: Sneeze and Be Slain	Norman Hunter	Kenneth Williams	03-Oct-83
2917	Sneeze and Be Slain and Other Incredible Stories: A Neighbourly Affair	Norman Hunter	Kenneth Williams	04-Oct-83
2918	Sneeze and Be Slain and Other Incredible Stories: Curtains for Count Bakwerdz	Norman Hunter	Kenneth Williams	05-Oct-83
2919	Sneeze and Be Slain and Other Incredible Stories: The Royal Reward	Norman Hunter	Kenneth Williams	06-Oct-83
2920	Sneeze and Be Slain and Other Incredible Stories: The Great Incrediblanian Election	Norman Hunter	Kenneth Williams	07-Oct-83
2921	The Song of Pentecost: Part 1 - Pentecosts Old and New	W. J. Corbett	Ronald Pickup	10-Oct-83
2922	The Song of Pentecost: Part 2 - Across the Great River	W. J. Corbett	Ronald Pickup	11-Oct-83
2923	The Song of Pentecost: Part 3 - Fox of Furrowfield	W. J. Corbett	Ronald Pickup	12-Oct-83
2924	The Song of Pentecost: Part 4 - The Battle of Snake's Pool	W. J. Corbett	Ronald Pickup	13-Oct-83
2925	The Song of Pentecost: Part 5 - Owl of Lickey Top	W. J. Corbett	Ronald Pickup	14-Oct-83
2926	The Otterbury Incident: Part 1 - The Ambush in Abbey Lane	Cecil Day-Lewis	Martin Jarvis	17-Oct-83
2927	The Otterbury Incident: Part 2 - Operation Glazier	Cecil Day-Lewis	Martin Jarvis	18-Oct-83
2928	The Otterbury Incident: Part 3 - The Detectives Get to Work	Cecil Day-Lewis	Martin Jarvis	19-Oct-83
2929	The Otterbury Incident: Part 4 - The Clue of the Bitten Half-Crown	Cecil Day-Lewis	Martin Jarvis	20-Oct-83
2930	The Otterbury Incident: Part 5 - Grand Assault	Cecil Day-Lewis	Martin Jarvis	21-Oct-83
2931	Jump!: Part 1 - The Awful Truth about the Earth's Crust	Ken Whitmore	Mike Harding	24-Oct-83
2932	Jump!: Part 2 - Moles arid Miss Morrisarde	Ken Whitmore	Mike Harding	25-Oct-83
2933	Jump!: Part 3 - Time Is Running Out....	Ken Whitmore	Mike Harding	26-Oct-83
2934	Jump!: Part 4 - Dickie Duckworth Lives Dangerously	Ken Whitmore	Mike Harding	27-Oct-83
2935	Jump!: Part 5 - The Final Hours	Ken Whitmore	Mike Harding	28-Oct-83
2936	Princess Moonlight	Traditional Japanese tale	Sayo Inaba	07-Nov-83
2937	The Tree of Blossoms	Traditional Japanese tale	Sayo Inaba	08-Nov-83
2938	Urashima and the Turtle	Traditional Japanese tale	Sayo Inaba	09-Nov-83
2939	The Adventure of Momotaro	Traditional Japanese tale	Sayo Inaba	10-Nov-83
2940	The Mirror of Matsuyama	Traditional Japanese tale	Sayo Inaba	11-Nov-83
2941	The BFG: Part 1 - The Snatch	Roald Dahl	Bill Oddie	14-Nov-83
2942	The BFG: Part 2 - Snozzcumbers and the Bloodbottler	Roald Dahl	Bill Oddie	15-Nov-83
2943	The BFG: Part 3 - Dream-catching	Roald Dahl	Bill Oddie	16-Nov-83
2944	The BFG: Part 4 - The Queen	Roald Dahl	Bill Oddie	17-Nov-83
2945	The BFG: Part 5 - Capture	Roald Dahl	Bill Oddie	18-Nov-83
2946	Travellers by Night: Part 1	Vivien Alcock	Lesley Dunlop	28-Nov-83
2947	Travellers by Night: Part 2	Vivien Alcock	Lesley Dunlop	29-Nov-83
2948	Travellers by Night: Part 3	Vivien Alcock	Lesley Dunlop	30-Nov-83
2949	Travellers by Night: Part 4	Vivien Alcock	Lesley Dunlop	01-Dec-83
2950	Travellers by Night: Part 5	Vivien Alcock	Lesley Dunlop	02-Dec-83
2951	The Making of Fingers Finnigan: Part 1 - Mr Punch	Berlie Doherty	Nerys Hughes	12-Dec-83
2952	The Making of Fingers Finnigan: Part 2 - Ganny Vitches	Berlie Doherty	Nerys Hughes	13-Dec-83
2953	The Making of Fingers Finnigan: Part 3 - Fingers Finnigan and the Saturday Matinee	Berlie Doherty	Nerys Hughes	14-Dec-83
2954	The Making of Fingers Finnigan: Part 4 - The Hermit of the Sandhills	Berlie Doherty	Nerys Hughes	15-Dec-83
2955	The Making of Fingers Finnigan: Part 5 - Presents	Berlie Doherty	Nerys Hughes	16-Dec-83
2956	Peter Pan: Part 1 - Come Away, Come Away!	J. M. Barrie	Jan Francis	19-Dec-83
2957	Peter Pan: Part 2 - The Neverland	J. M. Barrie	Jan Francis	20-Dec-83
2958	Peter Pan: Part 3 - The Lagoon	J. M. Barrie	Jan Francis	21-Dec-83
2959	Peter Pan: Part 4 - Do You Believe?	J. M. Barrie	Jan Francis	22-Dec-83
2960	Peter Pan: Part 5 - The Return Home	J. M. Barrie	Jan Francis	23-Dec-83
2961	The 13 Clocks: Part 1	James Thurber	Roy Kinnear/Colin Jeavons/Simon Shepherd	28-Dec-83
2962	The 13 Clocks: Part 2	James Thurber	Roy Kinnear/Colin Jeavons/Simon Shepherd	29-Dec-83
2963	The 13 Clocks: Part 3	James Thurber	Roy Kinnear/Colin Jeavons/Simon Shepherd	30-Dec-83

== 1984 ==
Episode	Story	Written by	Read by	Original air date
2964	Mouldy's Orphan: Part 1 - Canal Row	Gillian Avery	Valerie Whittington	09-Jan-84
2965	Mouldy's Orphan: Part 2 - The Outing	Gillian Avery	Valerie Whittington	10-Jan-84
2966	Mouldy's Orphan: Part 3 - A Stranger in the Family	Gillian Avery	Valerie Whittington	11-Jan-84
2967	Mouldy's Orphan: Part 4 - Benjy's Return	Gillian Avery	Valerie Whittington	12-Jan-84
2968	The Brontosaurus Birthday Cake	Robert McCrum	Tony Aitken	16-Jan-84
2969	Little Mabel Wins	Jilly Cooper	Victoria Wood	17-Jan-84
2970	The Magician and the Petnapping/The Magician and the Dragon	David McKee	Tony Aitken	18-Jan-84
2971	The Tiger Who Lost his Stripes	Anthony Paul	Victoria Wood	19-Jan-84
2972	East of the Sun and West of the Moon	Traditional Norwegian tale	Cécile Paoli	23-Jan-84
2973	The Duke's Beard	Traditional Italian tale	Cécile Paoli	24-Jan-84
2974	The Hunter	Traditional Yugoslavian tale	Cécile Paoli	25-Jan-84
2975	Cat Skin	Traditional French tale	Cécile Paoli	26-Jan-84
2976	The Phantom Tollbooth: Part 1 - Just Killing Time	Norton Juster	Christopher Guard	30-Jan-84
2977	The Phantom Tollbooth: Part 2 - A Short Shrift Sentence	Norton Juster	Christopher Guard	31-Jan-84
2978	The Phantom Tollbooth: Part 3 - Down with Silence!	Norton Juster	Christopher Guard	01-Feb-84
2979	The Phantom Tollbooth: Part 4 - It's mine. No it isn't	Norton Juster	Christopher Guard	02-Feb-84
2980	The Phantom Tollbooth: Part 5 - Whatever Goes Up Must Come Down	Norton Juster	Christopher Guard	03-Feb-84
2981	Jonny Briggs and the Jubilee Concert: Part 1 - The Vanishing Joke Book	Joan Eadington	Bernard Holley	13-Feb-84
2982	Jonny Briggs and the Jubilee Concert: Part 2 - The Performing Family	Joan Eadington	Bernard Holley	14-Feb-84
2983	Jonny Briggs and the Jubilee Concert: Part 3 - The Short List	Joan Eadington	Bernard Holley	15-Feb-84
2984	Jonny Briggs and the Jubilee Concert: Part 4 - Getting Ready	Joan Eadington	Bernard Holley	16-Feb-84
2985	Jonny Briggs and the Jubilee Concert: Part 5 - The Secret	Joan Eadington	Bernard Holley	17-Feb-84
2986	The Prince Who Hiccupped and other stories: The Prince Who Hiccupped	Anthony Armstrong	Penelope Keith	20-Feb-84
2987	The Prince Who Hiccupped and other stories: Presents for Princesses	Anthony Armstrong	Penelope Keith	21-Feb-84
2988	The Prince Who Hiccupped and other stories: The Two Princes	Anthony Armstrong	Penelope Keith	22-Feb-84
2989	The Prince Who Hiccupped and other stories: The Prince's Birthday Present	Anthony Armstrong	Penelope Keith	23-Feb-84
2990	The Prince Who Hiccupped and other stories: The Princess and the Frog	Anthony Armstrong	Penelope Keith	24-Feb-84
2991	What Katy Did: Part 1	Susan Coolidge	Pippa Guard	27-Feb-84
2992	What Katy Did: Part 2	Susan Coolidge	Pippa Guard	28-Feb-84
2993	What Katy Did: Part 3	Susan Coolidge	Pippa Guard	29-Feb-84
2994	What Katy Did: Part 4	Susan Coolidge	Pippa Guard	01-Mar-84
2995	What Katy Did: Part 5	Susan Coolidge	Pippa Guard	02-Mar-84
2996	The Kitchen Warriors: Part 1 - Prince Coriander's Return	Joan Aiken	Robert Lindsay	05-Mar-84
2997	The Kitchen Warriors: Part 2 - The Cat Mistigris	Joan Aiken	Robert Lindsay	06-Mar-84
2998	The Kitchen Warriors: Part 3 - The Nixie's Rescue	Joan Aiken	Robert Lindsay	07-Mar-84
2999	The Kitchen Warriors: Part 4 - The Furnace Dragon	Joan Aiken	Robert Lindsay	08-Mar-84
3000	The Kitchen Warriors: Part 5 - The Kelpies' Bowl	Joan Aiken	Robert Lindsay	09-Mar-84
3001	Tuck Everlasting: Part 1	Natalie Babbitt	Kathryn Pogson	12-Mar-84
3002	Tuck Everlasting: Part 2	Natalie Babbitt	Kathryn Pogson	13-Mar-84
3003	Tuck Everlasting: Part 3	Natalie Babbitt	Kathryn Pogson	14-Mar-84
3004	Tuck Everlasting: Part 4	Natalie Babbitt	Kathryn Pogson	15-Mar-84
3005	Tuck Everlasting: Part 5	Natalie Babbitt	Kathryn Pogson	16-Mar-84
3006	Jet, A Gift To The Family: Part 1	Geoffrey Kilner	Norman Beaton	20-Mar-84
3007	Jet, A Gift To The Family: Part 2	Geoffrey Kilner	Norman Beaton	21-Mar-84
3008	Jet, A Gift To The Family: Part 3	Geoffrey Kilner	Norman Beaton	22-Mar-84
3009	Jet, A Gift To The Family: Part 4	Geoffrey Kilner	Norman Beaton	23-Mar-84
3010	Jet, A Gift To The Family: Part 5	Geoffrey Kilner	Norman Beaton	24-Mar-84
3011	Carbonel: Part 1	Barbara Sleigh	Penelope Wilton	26-Mar-84
3012	Carbonel: Part 2	Barbara Sleigh	Penelope Wilton	27-Mar-84
3013	Carbonel: Part 3	Barbara Sleigh	Penelope Wilton	28-Mar-84
3014	Carbonel: Part 4	Barbara Sleigh	Penelope Wilton	29-Mar-84
3015	Carbonel: Part 5	Barbara Sleigh	Penelope Wilton	30-Mar-84
3016	The Old Man of Lochnagar	King Charles III		26-Sep-84
3017	Katy and the Nurgla	Harry Secombe	Harry Secombe	3-Oct-84
3018	Bertha and the Racing Pigeon	Pam Ayres	Pam Ayres	10-Oct-84
3019	Small Harry and the Toothache Pills	Michael Palin		17-Oct-84
3020	Curious Creatures	Lynne Byrnes	Bernard Cribbins, Penelope Wilton & Jonathon Morris	24-Oct-84
3021	When the Night Wind Howls	Alison Darke	Bernard Cribbins, Penelope Wilton & Jonathon Morris	31-Oct-84
3022	Never Stew Your Sister	Jan Brychta	Bernard Cribbins, Penelope Wilton & Jonathon Morris	7-Nov-84
3023	The Sheep-Pig: Part 1	Dick King-Smith	Peter Davison	12-Nov-84
3024	The Sheep-Pig: Part 2	Dick King-Smith	Peter Davison	13-Nov-84
3025	The Sheep-Pig: Part 3	Dick King-Smith	Peter Davison	14-Nov-84
3026	The Sheep-Pig: Part 4	Dick King-Smith	Peter Davison	15-Nov-84
3027	The Sheep-Pig: Part 5	Dick King-Smith	Peter Davison	16-Nov-84
3028	Handles: Part 1 - The Peacock	Jan Mark	Brian Cant	19-Nov-84
3029	Handles: Part 2 - Elsie's Kingdom	Jan Mark	Brian Cant	20-Nov-84
3030	Handles: Part 3 - Marrows	Jan Mark	Brian Cant	21-Nov-84
3031	Handles: Part 4 - A Plague of Frogs	Jan Mark	Brian Cant	22-Nov-84
3032	Handles: Part 5 - More Marrows	Jan Mark	Brian Cant	23-Nov-84
3033	A Little Princess: Part 1	Frances Hodgson Burnett	Jane Asher	26-Nov-84
3034	A Little Princess: Part 2	Frances Hodgson Burnett	Jane Asher	27-Nov-84
3035	A Little Princess: Part 3	Frances Hodgson Burnett	Jane Asher	28-Nov-84
3036	A Little Princess: Part 4	Frances Hodgson Burnett	Jane Asher	29-Nov-84
3037	A Little Princess: Part 5	Frances Hodgson Burnett	Jane Asher	30-Nov-84
3038	The Cybil War: Part 1	Betsy Byars	David Baxt	10-Dec-84
3039	The Cybil War: Part 2	Betsy Byars	David Baxt	11-Dec-84
3040	The Cybil War: Part 3	Betsy Byars	David Baxt	12-Dec-84
3041	The Cybil War: Part 4	Betsy Byars	David Baxt	13-Dec-84
3042	The Cybil War: Part 5	Betsy Byars	David Baxt	14-Dec-84
3038	The Land of Green Ginger: Part 1	Noel Langley	Michael Barrymore	17-Dec-84
3039	The Land of Green Ginger: Part 2	Noel Langley	Michael Barrymore	18-Dec-84
3040	The Land of Green Ginger: Part 3	Noel Langley	Michael Barrymore	19-Dec-84
3041	The Land of Green Ginger: Part 4	Noel Langley	Michael Barrymore	20-Dec-84
3042	The Land of Green Ginger: Part 5	Noel Langley	Michael Barrymore	21-Dec-84
3043	William at Christmas: William Starts the Holidays	Richmal Crompton	Martin Jarvis	27-Dec-84
3044	William at Christmas: The Outlaws and Cousin Percy	Richmal Crompton	Martin Jarvis	28-Dec-84

== 1985 ==
Episode	Story	Written by	Read by	Original air date
3045	William at Christmas	Richmal Crompton	Martin Jarvis	02-Jan-85
3046	William at Christmas: William Plays Santa Claus	Richmal Crompton	Martin Jarvis	03-Jan-85
3047	William at Christmas: The Christmas Truce	Richmal Crompton	Martin Jarvis	04-Jan-85
3048	Farmer Giles of Ham: Part 1	J. R. R. Tolkien	Freddie Jones	07-Jan-85
3049	Farmer Giles of Ham: Part 2	J. R. R. Tolkien	Freddie Jones	08-Jan-85
3050	Farmer Giles of Ham: Part 3	J. R. R. Tolkien	Freddie Jones	09-Jan-85
3051	Farmer Giles of Ham: Part 4	J. R. R. Tolkien	Freddie Jones	10-Jan-85
3052	Theseus the Hero	Traditional	Tony Robinson	11-Jan-85
3053	Theseus the Hero: Part 2 - The Minotaur	Traditional	Tony Robinson	14-Jan-85
3054	Theseus the Hero: Part 3 - The Escape	Traditional	Tony Robinson	21-Jan-85
3055	Theseus the Hero: Part 4 - The Underworld	Traditional	Tony Robinson	28-Jan-85
3056	The Church Mouse	Graham Oakley	Griff Rhys Jones	15-Jan-85
3057	The Church Cat Abroad	Graham Oakley	Griff Rhys Jones	16-Jan-85
3058	The Church Mice and the Moon	Graham Oakley	Griff Rhys Jones	17-Jan-85
3059	The Church Mice Spread Their Wings	Graham Oakley	Griff Rhys Jones	18-Jan-85
3060	Simon and the Witch: Part 1 - The Backwards Spell	Margaret Stuart Barry	Nerys Hughes	22-Jan-85
3061	Simon and the Witch: Part 2 - The Lost Magic Wand	Margaret Stuart Barry	Nerys Hughes	23-Jan-85
3062	Simon and the Witch: Part 3 - Angelica	Margaret Stuart Barry	Nerys Hughes	24-Jan-85
3063	Simon and the Witch: Part 4 - The Cure for George	Margaret Stuart Barry	Nerys Hughes	25-Jan-85
3064	Harry's Mad: Part 1	Dick King-Smith	Tony Aitken	29-Jan-85
3065	Harry's Mad: Part 2	Dick King-Smith	Tony Aitken	30-Jan-85
3066	Harry's Mad: Part 3	Dick King-Smith	Tony Aitken	31-Jan-85
3067	Harry's Mad: Part 4	Dick King-Smith	Tony Aitken	01-Feb-85
3068	Cycle Star of Peeling Tower: Part 1 - The Find	Joan Eadington	Tina Heath	11-Feb-85
3069	Cycle Star of Peeling Tower: Part 2 - The Missing Money	Joan Eadington	Tina Heath	12-Feb-85
3070	Cycle Star of Peeling Tower: Part 3 - The Giveaway	Joan Eadington	Tina Heath	13-Feb-85
3071	Cycle Star of Peeling Tower: Part 4 - Strange Goings On	Joan Eadington	Tina Heath	14-Feb-85
3072	Cycle Star of Peeling Tower: Part 5 - Excitement All the Way	Joan Eadington	Tina Heath	15-Feb-85
3073	The Ring in the Rough Stuff: Part 1	Antonia Barber	Jonathon Morris	18-Feb-85
3074	The Ring in the Rough Stuff: Part 2	Antonia Barber	Jonathon Morris	19-Feb-85
3075	The Ring in the Rough Stuff: Part 3	Antonia Barber	Jonathon Morris	20-Feb-85
3076	The Ring in the Rough Stuff: Part 4	Antonia Barber	Jonathon Morris	21-Feb-85
3077	The Ring in the Rough Stuff: Part 5	Antonia Barber	Jonathon Morris	22-Feb-85
3078	The Hollow Land: Part 1 - Bell and Harry	Jane Gardam	Bernard Hill	25-Feb-85
3079	The Hollow Land: Part 2 - The Hollow Land	Jane Gardam	Bernard Hill	26-Feb-85
3080	The Hollow Land: Part 3 - The Household Word	Jane Gardam	Bernard Hill	27-Feb-85
3081	The Hollow Land: Part 4 - Table Talk	Jane Gardam	Bernard Hill	28-Feb-85
3082	The Hollow Land: Part 5 - Tomorrow's Arrangements	Jane Gardam	Bernard Hill	1-Mar-85
3083	Wilkes the Wizard: Part 1 - How It All Started	Jackie Webb	Christopher Biggins	4-Mar-85
3084	Wilkes the Wizard: Part 2 - How Mr. Wilkes Was Nearly Supplanted	Jackie Webb	Christopher Biggins	5-Mar-85
3085	Wilkes the Wizard: Part 3 - Of Car-Parks and Lawnmowers	Jackie Webb	Christopher Biggins	6-Mar-85
3086	Wilkes the Wizard: Part 4 - The Plot Goes Haywire	Jackie Webb	Christopher Biggins	7-Mar-85
3087	Wilkes the Wizard: Part 5 - How Things Went Disastrously Right in the End	Jackie Webb	Christopher Biggins	8-Mar-85
3088	Tatty Apple: Part 1	Jenny Nimmo	Hayley Mills	11-Mar-85
3089	Tatty Apple: Part 2	Jenny Nimmo	Hayley Mills	12-Mar-85
3090	Tatty Apple: Part 3	Jenny Nimmo	Hayley Mills	13-Mar-85
3091	Tatty Apple: Part 4	Jenny Nimmo	Hayley Mills	14-Mar-85
3092	Tatty Apple: Part 5	Jenny Nimmo	Hayley Mills	15-Mar-85
3093	Uninvited Ghosts	Penelope Lively	Rosemary Leach	18-Mar-85
3094	Uninvited Ghosts: The Dragon Tunnel	Penelope Lively	Rosemary Leach	19-Mar-85
3095	Uninvited Ghosts: A Martian Comes to Stay	Penelope Lively	Rosemary Leach	20-Mar-85
3096	Uninvited Ghosts: The Great Mushroom Mistake	Penelope Lively	Rosemary Leach	21-Mar-85
3097	Uninvited Ghosts: Disastrous Dog	Penelope Lively	Rosemary Leach	22-Mar-85
3098	The Magic Pudding: The First Slice	Norman Lindsay	Willie Rushton	25-Mar-85
3099	The Magic Pudding: The Second Slice	Norman Lindsay	Willie Rushton	26-Mar-85
4000	The Magic Pudding: The Third Slice	Norman Lindsay	Willie Rushton	27-Mar-85
4001	The Magic Pudding: The Fourth Slice	Norman Lindsay	Willie Rushton	28-Mar-85
4002	The Magic Pudding: The Fifth Slice	Norman Lindsay	Willie Rushton	29-Mar-85

== 1986 ==
Episode	Story	Written by	Read by	Original air date
4003	George's Marvellous Medicine: The Marvellous Plan	Roald Dahl	Rik Mayall	06-Jan-86
4004	George's Marvellous Medicine: The Cook-Up	Roald Dahl	Rik Mayall	07-Jan-86
4005	George's Marvellous Medicine: Grandma Gets the Medicine	Roald Dahl	Rik Mayall	08-Jan-86
4006	George's Marvellous Medicine: The Pig, the Bullocks, the Sheep, the Pony and the Nanny-goat	Roald Dahl	Rik Mayall	09-Jan-86
4007	George's Marvellous Medicine: Marvellous Medicine Nos. Two, Three and Four	Roald Dahl	Rik Mayall	10-Jan-86
4008	The Iron Man	Ted Hughes	Tom Baker	20-Jan-86
4009	The Iron Man: The Return of the Iron Man	Ted Hughes	Tom Baker	21-Jan-86
4010	The Iron Man: What's to Be Done with the Iron Man	Ted Hughes	Tom Baker	22-Jan-86
4011	The Iron Man: The Space Being and the Iron Man	Ted Hughes	Tom Baker	23-Jan-86
4012	The Iron Man: The Iron Man's Challenge	Ted Hughes	Tom Baker	24-Jan-86
4013	The Hundred-and-One Dalmatians	Dodie Smith	Sarah Greene	27-Jan-86
4014	The Hundred-and-One Dalmatians: The Puppies Disappear	Dodie Smith	Sarah Greene	28-Jan-86
4015	The Hundred-and-One Dalmatians: Hell Hall Discovered	Dodie Smith	Sarah Greene	29-Jan-86
4016	The Hundred-and-One Dalmatians: Fifteen Puppies - Plus!	Dodie Smith	Sarah Greene	30-Jan-86
4017	The Hundred-and-One Dalmatians: Cruella in Pursuit	Dodie Smith	Sarah Greene	31-Jan-86
4018	James and the Giant Peach: Part One	Roald Dahl	Kenneth Williams	10-Feb-86
4019	James and the Giant Peach: Part Two	Roald Dahl	Kenneth Williams	11-Feb-86
4020	James and the Giant Peach: Part Three	Roald Dahl	Kenneth Williams	12-Feb-86
4021	James and the Giant Peach: Part Four	Roald Dahl	Kenneth Williams	13-Feb-86
4022	James and the Giant Peach: Part Five	Roald Dahl	Kenneth Williams	14-Feb-86
4023	Stig of the Dump: The Ground Gives Way	Clive King	Christopher Guard	17-Feb-86
4024	Stig of the Dump: Digging with Stig	Clive King	Christopher Guard	18-Feb-86
4025	Stig of the Dump: The Snargets	Clive King	Christopher Guard	19-Feb-86
4026	Stig of the Dump: Midsummer Night	Clive King	Christopher Guard	20-Feb-86
4027	Stig of the Dump: The Standing Stones	Clive King	Christopher Guard	21-Feb-86
4028	The Circus of Adventure: Home from School	Enid Blyton	Joanna Monro	03-Mar-86
4029	The Circus of Adventure: Happenings in the Night	Enid Blyton	Joanna Monro	04-Mar-86
4030	The Circus of Adventure: Jack is on His Own	Enid Blyton	Joanna Monro	05-Mar-86
4031	The Circus of Adventure: A Daring Plan	Enid Blyton	Joanna Monro	06-Mar-86
4032	The Circus of Adventure: To Borken Castle Again!	Enid Blyton	Joanna Monro	07-Mar-86
4033	Charlie and the Chocolate Factory: Mr. Wonka's Mystery Workers	Roald Dahl	Michael Palin	17-Mar-86
4034	Charlie and the Chocolate Factory: The Golden Tickets	Roald Dahl	Michael Palin	18-Mar-86
4035	Charlie and the Chocolate Factory: Inside the Gates	Roald Dahl	Michael Palin	19-Mar-86
4036	Charlie and the Chocolate Factory: Goodbye Veruca and Violet	Roald Dahl	Michael Palin	20-Mar-86
4037	Charlie and the Chocolate Factory: The Great Glass Lift	Roald Dahl	Michael Palin	21-Mar-86
4038	Littenose and Two-Eyes	John Grant		24-Mar-86
4039	Littenose and Two-Eyes: The Amber Pedant	John Grant		25-Mar-86
4040	Littenose and Two-Eyes: Littlenose the Swinger	John Grant		26-Mar-86
4041	Littenose and Two-Eyes: Rock-a-bye Littlenose	John Grant		27-Mar-86
4042	Mrs. Pepperpot: Little Old Mrs. Pepperpot	Alf Prøysen	Thora Hird	01-Apr-86
4043	Mrs. Pepperpot: Mrs. Pepperpot Gives a Party	Alf Prøysen	Thora Hird	02-Apr-86
4044	My Naughty Little Sister Part 1	Dorothy Edwards	Thora Hird	03-Apr-86
4045	My Naughty Little Sister Part 2	Dorothy Edwards	Thora Hird	04-Apr-86
4046	London Snow Part 1	Paul Theroux	Elizabeth Spriggs	23-Dec-86
4047	London Snow Part 2	Paul Theroux	Elizabeth Spriggs	24-Dec-86
