= Lost Musicals =

British musical theatre project of Ian Marshall Fisher

Lost Musicals is a British musical theatre project established in 1989 by Ian Marshall Fisher. It is dedicated to presenting lost or forgotten musicals by famous American writers, and has been responsible for the first revivals of the lesser-known works of writers such as Stephen Sondheim, Cole Porter, Alan Jay Lerner, Richard Rodgers, Oscar Hammerstein II, Harold Arlen and Jerome Kern.

== Approach and philosophy ==
Ian Marshall Fisher researches, reconstructs and directs each show based upon exactly what the writers had written, with no changes, amendments and no edits to their original work. In an interview with The Stage in 2005, Fisher commented "My original idea was to celebrate the writers in accurately presenting what they had written – and I don't just mean the songwriters but the bookwriters too. That's where my series stands alone. Although other series have sprung up in the last ten years, they don't honour and have a love for the books that I do."

In another interview, Fisher criticised what he reviewed as the recent trivialisation of musicals, saying "Those people who were involved in the Broadway musical wanted to speak to the public. The campery and kitschness is something that's been ladled on to it subsequently."

== History ==
Lost Musicals began in 1989, and its productions have been presented at London's Barbican Centre, the Royal Opera House, Her Majesty's Theatre and the Victoria & Albert Museum. The project's current home is the Sadler's Wells Theatre. Some of the seventy shows presented have included musicals by George S. Kaufman, Howard Dietz and Arthur Schwartz's The Band Wagon, André Previn and Alan Jay Lerner's Coco, Herbert and Dorothy Fields and Cole Porter's Mexican Hayride, Sammy Fain and E.Y. Harburg's Flahooley, Cole Porter and S. J. Perelman's Aladdin, Kurt Weill and Paul Green's Johnny Johnson, Rodgers and Lorenz Hart's By Jupiter, S. J. Perelman, Ogden Nash and Weill's One Touch of Venus, Herbert Fields, B. G. DeSylva & Cole Porter's Du Barry Was a Lady and Jule Styne, Nunnally Johnson and E Y Harburg's Darling of the Day.

=== Early years and the Barbican (1989–1998) ===
Lost Musicals has given concert revivals of musicals that have since become more familiar in stagings by other companies. For instance, in November and December 1991 the company gave a performance of Weill's Love Life at the Victoria & Albert Museum with a cast including David Firth and Louise Gold. This was followed by a major production of the same show by Opera North in 1996. In May 1992, Lost Musicals moved to the Barbican Center's Cinema 1, where By Jupiter was performed by a cast including Myra Sands, Issy Van Randwyck and Louise Gold. Sands and Gold went on to appear in "One Touch of Venus" in August of the same year.

The project's final season at the Barbican took place in 1998, when five productions were offered. Irving Berlin and Moss Hart's revue As Thousands Cheer opened the season with a cast featuring Danielle Carson and Paula Wilcox. This was followed by Alan Jay Lerner and Burton Lane's first Broadway musical, On a Clear Day You Can See Forever, with Jessica Martin and David Firth. Later in the year, George S. Kaufman's Hollywood Pinafore (based on Gilbert and Sullivan's H.M.S. Pinafore) was presented with actors including Ian Lavender, Frank Lazarus and Matt Zimmerman. This was followed by a rare stage performance of Stephen Sondheim's The Frogs, starring James Vaughan. Finally, to mark the Gershwin centenary the company presented Strike Up the Band in the Barbican Concert Hall, with the BBC Concert Orchestra. The cast included Barry Cryer and Sam Kelly.

=== The West End and the Royal Opera House, Covent Garden ===
After this period at the Barbican, in 1999 the project moved to the West End. The first three productions that year took place at the Fortune Theatre. First, in May the company performed Kaufman, Hart, Rodgers and Hart's I'd Rather Be Right, with a cast that included Kenneth Haigh. Harvey Schmidt and Tom Jones's 110 in the Shade was presented in July, with four performances of Burton Lane, Fred Saidy and E. Y. Harburg's Finian's Rainbow in September. On 21 and 28 November, the project moved to Her Majesty's Theatre for Cole Porter and Moss Hart's Jubilee, which featured the BBC Concert Orchestra and was later broadcast on BBC Radio 3.

This was followed in 2000 by a move to the Royal Opera House, Covent Garden. The Kurt Weill centenary was marked in December of that year by a semi-staging of One Touch of Venus, which included a reconstruction of Agnes de Mille's original choreography, which was performed by the Central School of Ballet. The cast included Jessica Martin and Louise Gold, with the Royal Philharmonic Concert Orchestra.

In 2001, Fisher presented a fund-raising gala at the Royal Opera House called A Lost Musicals Occasion, which featured appearances by Gold, Kitty Carlisle Hart, Liza Pulman and Jessica Martin. This was followed later that year by two performances of Porter's Du Barry Was a Lady at Her Majesty's Theatre, with accompaniment by the BBC Concert Orchestra. The cast included Gold, Lauren Ward, James Vaughan and Desmond Barrit. The production was broadcast on BBC Radio 3 on 27 December 2001. The 2001 season also included three fund-raising performances of Cole Porter's Let's Face It in New York at the New York Historical Society in September, while the short 2002 season consisted of two performances of Porter's Fifty Million Frenchmen at the Royal Opera House, with a cast including Laura Michelle Kelly, Dilys Laye and Alan Cox.

=== Later years ===
Some of the revivals have been UK premieres or first revivals of the shows. For instance, in 2005 the company gave the stage premiere of Evening Primrose, a little-known 1967 television musical by Stephen Sondheim, with a cast including Betsy Blair and Gary Raymond. The same year saw the company's second production of Fanny, starring Liza Pulman and James Smilie, and Porter's Silk Stockings.

In 2010 Lost Musicals presented the first complete revival of Alan Jay Lerner and Frederick Loewe's second Broadway musical, The Day Before Spring, following on from the rediscovery of the full vocal score. It was the first time all the music had been heard since 1946.

== Overview ==
Many of the shows have been broadcast by BBC Radio 3. Casting of the shows has often involved veteran performers with experience appearing in classic Broadway shows. For instance, the 2008 Lost Musicals production of Sail Away starred Penny Fuller, whose Broadway credits include Richard Rodgers's Rex, Applause opposite Lauren Bacall and a replacement Sally Bowles in the original Broadway Cabaret. Some of the two thousand actors who have taken part in the performances have included, in addition to those named above, James Corden, Daniel Massey, Sara Kestelman, Anne Reid, Joanna Riding, Andrew Lincoln, John Savident, Henry Goodman, David de Keyser, Anna Francolini, Christopher Benjamin, David Pittu and members of London's Royal National Theatre and Royal Shakespeare Company.

In 1999 Lost Musicals was recognised by the British Charity Commissioners as an educational charitable trust, titled The Lost Musicals Charitable Trust. The project's educational output has been varied: for instance, in 2011 Princeton University invited Fisher to present a talk about the project to students and staff at Princeton.

== Productions ==
- 1989-90: Fanny, Allegro, Trouble in Tahiti
- 1991: Out of This World, Greenwillow, Do I Hear A Waltz?, Love Life, Pipe Dream, The Golden Apple
- 1992: By Jupiter, A Tree Grows in Brooklyn, Jubilee, One Touch of Venus, Do I Hear A Waltz?
- 1993: Du Barry Was a Lady, Music in the Air, Carnival!, Allegro, Knickerbocker Holiday
- 1994: Let's Face It, Bloomer Girl, New Girl in Town, Strike Up the Band, Red, Hot and Blue
- 1995: Something for the Boys, Plain and Fancy, Take Me Along, Leave It to Me!, Love Life
- 1996: Out of This World, Sweet Adeline, I Can Get It For You Wholesale, Of Thee I Sing, Panama Hattie
- 1997: Gentlemen Prefer Blondes, Face The Music, Flahooley, Oh, Kay!, Jubilee
- 1998: As Thousands Cheer, On a Clear Day You Can See Forever, Hollywood Pinafore, The Frogs, Strike Up The Band
- 1999: I'd Rather Be Right, 110 in the Shade, Finian's Rainbow, Jubilee
- 2000: Gay Divorce, One Touch of Venus
- 2001: A Lost Musicals Occasion, Let's Face It, Silk Stockings, Du Barry Was a Lady
- 2002: Fifty Million Frenchmen
- 2003: Tales and Tunes
- 2005: Fanny, Evening Primrose, Silk Stockings
- 2006: Flower Drum Song, Nymph Errant
- 2007: Can-Can, Around the World
- 2008: Park Avenue, Sail Away
- 2009: The New Yorkers, Johnny Johnson
- 2010: Paris, The Day Before Spring, Darling of the Day
- 2011: The Band Wagon, Coco, Mexican Hayride
- 2012: Flahooley, Aladdin
- 2013: Words and Music, Holly Golightly, Around the World
