= Doctor Dolittle (musical) =

Stage musical with book, music and lyrics by Leslie Bricusse

- Original London production flyer
- Music: Leslie Bricusse
- Lyrics: Leslie Bricusse
- Book: Leslie Bricusse
- Basis: 1967 film and the children's books by Hugh Lofting
- Productions: 1998 London; 2000 UK tour 2005 US tour 2007 UK tour 2018 UK tour

Doctor Dolittle is a stage musical with book, music and lyrics by Leslie Bricusse, based on the 1967 movie of the same name and the children's stories by Hugh Lofting about the adventures of a doctor who learns to speak the language of various animals and treats them as patients. The musical features the same songs as the film (which starred Rex Harrison, Samantha Eggar, Anthony Newley and Richard Attenborough), including the Academy Award-winning "Talk to the Animals".

The musical made its world premiere in London at the Hammersmith Apollo in 1998, followed by tours of the UK and US.

== Productions ==
=== Original London production (1998-99) and UK tour (2000-2001) ===
The world premiere production opened at the Hammersmith Apollo in London on 14 July 1998, starring TV presenter and personality Phillip Schofield in the title role. The role played by Anthony Newley in the film was played by Irish television presenter and actor Bryan Smyth. The production was directed by Steven Pimlott, designed by Mark Thompson, choreographed by Aletta Collins and its lighting designed by Hugh Vanstone; and featured animal puppets provided by Jim Henson's Creature Shop. The production also featured the pre-recorded voice of Julie Andrews as Polynesia the parrot.

Following his run as Joseph in Joseph and the Amazing Technicolor Dreamcoat at the London Palladium (after replacing Jason Donovan), Doctor Dolittle was the second stage musical that Schofield starred in. Leslie Bricusse stated that the title role would be played by someone younger than Rex Harrison was in the original movie:

"Rex Harrison was fabulous, but he was a generation and half older than the leading lady Samantha Eggar. With a younger Dr. Dolittle, the potential of that relationship is much greater".

The production's budget cost £4 million, at the time one of the most expensive musicals ever staged. The production closed on 26 June 1999, having run for almost a year.

It was followed by a UK tour in 2000 and 2001 which also starred Schofield, who shared the title role with Paul Nicholas and Russ Abbot.

=== US National Tour (2005-06) ===
The show made its American debut on a national tour which began at the Benedum Center in Pittsburg from August 2, 2005. The production starred Tom Hewitt in the title role and was directed by Glenn Casale, with sets designed by Kenneth Foy, costumes designed by Ann Hould-Ward, puppets and magic designed by Michael Curry, and choreography by Rob Ashford. After just nine weeks of touring, the producers announced that the production would close due to the lack of ticket sales.

Following the early closure of the production, nine-time Tony Award Winner, Tommy Tune directed and starred in a revamped version of the tour from January 2006. The rest of the creative team remained the same as the start of the tour. The production was produced by Pittsburgh CLO, Nederlander Presentations, Inc., Independent Presenters Network and Columbia Artists Theatricals.

=== Further UK tours ===
==== 2007-08 UK tour ====
In 2007, Bill Kenwright produced a brand new production of the musical starring Tommy Steele in the title role which toured the UK until the following year. The production was directed by Bob Tomson, designed by Paul Farnsworth and choreographed by Karen Bruce. This production was a revised version with many changes to the book and musical numbers.

==== 2018-19 UK tour ====
A new UK tour presented by Music & Lyrics opened on 9 November 2018 at the Churchill Theatre in Bromley, Greater London. Mark Williams played the title role alongside Brian Capron as Blossom / Straight Arrow, Vicky Entwistle as Polynesia, Mollie Melia-Redgrave as Emma Fairfax and Patric Sullivan as Matthew Muggins. The production was directed by Christopher Renshaw, designed by Tom Piper and choreographed by Josh Rhodes with musical supervision by Mike Dixon.

Music & Lyrics Productions closed the tour at the end of its run at the New Theatre, Oxford on 26 January 2019. The company cited lower advance ticket sales than anticipated as the reason for the decision.

== Cast and characters ==
Character	Original London cast	2000/1 UK tour	2005 US tour	2007/8 UK tour	2018/19 UK tour
Doctor Dolittle	Phillip Schofield	Phillip Schofield; Paul Nicholas; Russ Abbot	Tom Hewitt	Tommy Steele	Mark Williams
Emma Fairfax	Sarah Jane Hassell	Liza Pulman; Kathleen Shueppert	Nancy Anderson	Abigail Jaye	Mollie Melia-Redgrave
Matthew Muggins	Bryan Smyth	David Ganly; Jimmy Johnston	Tony Yazbeck	Conor Michael-Sheridan	Patrick Sullivan
Tommy Stubbins	James Paul Bradley; Samuel Carter-Brown; Darien Smith	Steven Fitton; Joshua Ellis-Barnard; Jamie Finch	Shadoe Alan Brandt	Joanna Forest	Harry Cross; Elliot Morris; Quillan O’Meara McDonald; Louis Parker; Elliott Rose; Thomas Ryan
General Bellowes	Peter Cellier	George Little	Eric Micheal Gillett	Halcro Johnston	Adèle Anderson
Albert Blossom	John Rawnsley	John Rawnsley	Ed Dixon	David Anthony	Brian Capron
Straight Arrow	Peter Gallagher	Sam Mancuso	Eric Michael Gillett	Ako Mitchell	Brian Capron
Polynesia	Julie Andrews (voice)	Julie Andrews (voice) Ronnie Le Drew (puppet)	Susan J. Jacks	Debden Clarke Rebecca Hyland	Vicky Entwistle

== Musical numbers ==
=== Original London production ===
Act I

- "Overture" - Orchestra
- "My Friend the Doctor" - Matthew, Tommy, Company
- "The Vegetarian" - Doctor Dolittle
- "Talk to the Animals" - Doctor Dolittle, Polynesia
- "Doctor Dolittle" - Matthew, Tommy, Company
- "You're Impossible" - Emma, Doctor Dolittle
- "I've Never Seen Anything Like It" - Blossom, Doctor Dolittle, Company
- "Beautiful Things" - Emma
- "When I Look in Your Eyes" - Doctor Dolittle
- "Like Animals" - Doctor Dolittle

Act II

- "After Today" - Matthew
- "Fabulous Places" - Doctor Dolittle, Emma, Matthew, Tommy
- "Where Are the Words?" - Doctor Dolittle, Matthew
- "The Storm" - Orchestra
- "I Think I Like You" - Emma, Doctor Dolittle
- "Save the Animals" - Straight Arrow, Company
- "Entrance of Jean-Claude" - Orchestra
- "The Christmas Song (Chestnuts Roasting on an Open Fire)" - Doctor Dolittle
- "My Friend the Doctor" (reprise) - Straight Arrow
- "The Voice of Protest" - Emma, Matthew, Bellows
- Finale: "I've Never Seen Anything Like It" (reprise) / "My Friend the Doctor" (reprise II) - Company
- Bows: "Talk to the Animals" (reprise) - Company

=== 2007/08 UK touring production ===
Act I

- "Overture" - Orchestra
- "Puddleby-By-The-Sea" - Company, Matthew
- "My Friend the Doctor" - Matthew, Doctor Dolittle, Company
- "Talk to the Animals" - Doctor Dolittle
- "He's Impossible" - Emma, Matthew
- "The Time of Our Lives" - Doctor Dolittle, Matthew, Polynesia, Tommy
- "I've Never Seen Anything Like It"
- "My Friend the Doctor" (reprise) - Emma, Matthew
- "When I Look in Your Eyes" - Doctor Dolittle
- "After Today" - Doctor Dolittle

Act II

- "Entr'acte" - Orchestra
- "Fabulous Places" - Doctor Dolittle, Emma, Matthew, Tommy
- "Where are the Words?" - Doctor Dolittle
- "Save The Animals" - Doctor Dolittle, Straight Arrow, Company
- "The Christmas Song (Chestnuts Roasting on an Open Fire)" - Doctor Dolittle
- "After Today" (reprise) - Doctor Dolittle
- "The Voice of Protest" - Emma, Matthew, Bellows, Company
- "I've Never Seen Anything Like It" (reprise) - Blossom, Gertie, Company
- "My Friend the Doctor" (reprise) - Company
- "Doctor Dolittle" - Doctor Dolittle, Company

=== Cast recording ===
The original London cast recording starring Phillip Schofield was released on 1 October 1998 by Exalshallow Ltd, featuring 22 tracks.
