= Instant Sunshine (disambiguation) =

Instant Sunshine can refer to:

- The comedy cabaret quartet
- An EP by British band Suede
