= Booked! =

BBC radio programme

- Running time: 35 minute
- Country of origin: United Kingdom
- Language: English
- Home station: BBC Radio 4
- Starring: Ian McMillan; Mark Thomas; David Stafford; Stuart Maconie; Linda Smith; Dillie Keane; Miles Kington; Roger McGough
- Original release: October 1995 – April 2000
- No. of episodes: 30

Booked! is a radio programme that originally aired from October 1995 to April 2000. There were thirty 35-minute episodes and it was broadcast on BBC Radio 4. It starred Ian McMillan, Mark Thomas, David Stafford, Stuart Maconie, Linda Smith, Dillie Keane, Miles Kington, and Roger McGough.
