= Don Homfray =

Don Homfray (1935–2012) was a BAFTA-winning production designer for the BBC.

Homfray was born at Codsall, Staffordshire, in 1935. He studied architecture at Wolverhampton Polytechnic and then worked for the BBC as a production designer in Birmingham, Cardiff and London.

Homfray was awarded a BAFTA for his work on the 1972 BBC production of War and Peace, and was nominated for his work on Germinal (1970) and Vienna 1900 (1973).

He designed seven of the plays in the BBC Television Shakespeare series: Henry IV, Parts 1 and 2 (1979), Henry V (1979), Hamlet (1980), A Winter's Tale (1981), The Merry Wives of Windsor (1982) and The Comedy of Errors (1983).

He retired in the mid-1990s and went on to take a degree in history from the University of East Anglia. He died on 12 January 2012.
