= Stop the Week =

British radio programme

- Country of origin: United Kingdom
- Language(s): English
- Home station: BBC Radio 4
- Hosted by: Robert Robinson
- Produced by: Michael Ember
- Original release: 28 September 1974 – 25 July 1992

Stop the Week is a British radio discussion programme chaired by Robert Robinson, which ran on BBC Radio 4 from 1974 to 1992.

== Origins ==
The BBC Radio's Current Affairs Department decided that it wanted a programme that would act as a bookend to Monday morning's Start the Week with Richard Baker, which had been running for about four years.

Stop the Week ran on a Saturday evening, and its brief was to be a weekly magazine of satire, topical guests and music. The Hungarian émigré Michael Ember, also the producer of Start the Week, was chosen as the producer.

The programme was presented by Robert Robinson who had just ended a three-year run on the Today programme.

The last show went out at 6:50pm on the evening of Saturday 25 July 1992.

== Format ==
Each week a panel of four or five, drawn from a pool of 'regulars', would discuss a number of topics, usually more or less frivolous, such as "Is Dan Maskell posh?"

Among the regulars were Ann Leslie, Laurie Taylor, Milton Shulman, Benny Green, Nicholas Tucker, Dr Anthony Clare, Dr Michael O'Donnell, Edward Blishen, Rosalind Miles, Stephen Oliver, Sarah Harrison, Jasper Griffin, Christopher Page, Philip Oakes, Matthew Parris and Roger Royle.

The musical interlude was provided by regulars such as Mervyn Stutter, Instant Sunshine, Jeremy Nicholas, Fascinating Aïda (or Dillie Keane alone), Peter Skellern and Jungr and Parker.

== See also ==
- Loose Ends (radio programme)

== Sources ==
- Robert Robinson, Skip All That, Century, 1997
- Russell Twisk, "Full stop as a major irritant gets scratched", The Observer, 26 April 1992
- Dennis Barker, "Stop the week, I want to get off", The Guardian, 20 July 1992
