= Keith Drinkel =

English actor

- Born: 14 November 1944 (age 81); York, England
- Occupation: Actor

Keith Drinkel (born 14 November 1944) is an English actor.

Drinkel was born in York, educated at St Michael's College, Leeds, and lived in Brighton before moving to SW France.

His notable appearances in film and television include A Family at War (1970), Yellow Dog (1973), a minor role in the BBC's adaptation of the Lord Peter Wimsey story The Nine Tailors (1974), Looking for Clancy (1975), A Bridge Too Far (1977), Gandhi (1982) and the Doctor Who story Time-Flight (1982). He co-starred in series three and four of Peter Tinniswood's long-running comedy I Didn't Know You Cared, and appeared as Mark Gaskell in The Body in the Library (1984).<

Drinkel appeared in Eastenders in 1999 as a Prison Officer and twice in Coronation Street, in 2001–02 as Maurice Gregory, father of barmaid Geena on Rovers Return, and most recently, in 2005, as Bob, who dated Liz McDonald for a short time.

In 2006, Drinkel starred in Rock-A-Hula Rest Home as "Jesse Garon", an elderly man who believes he is Elvis Presley. Drinkel guest-starred in the Big Finish Productions audio adventures Doctor Who: Catch-1782, Sapphire and Steel: The School and Professor Bernice Summerfield: Timeless Passages. In 2008 he starred along with Jo Castleton and Daniel Harcourt in Zygon: When Being You Just Isn't Enough.

== Filmography ==
Year	Title	Role	Notes
1973	Yellow Dog	Eric	
1977	A Bridge Too Far	Lieutenant Cornish	
1982	Gandhi	Major	
1995	Fanny Hill	Mr. Hart	
2008	Zygon: When Being You Just Isn't Enough	Bob Calhoun / Torlakhl	
