= Issy van Randwyck =

English actress

Isabelle Caroline van Randwyck Hall known as Issy van Randwyck (born 1963, Hong Kong) is a Dutch singer and actress. She is a former member of British comedy singing group and satirical cabaret act Fascinating Aïda.

== Biography ==
Of Dutch descent, Baroness Isabelle van Randwyck grew up in Kent and was educated at Sibton Park, West Heath Girls' School, and Queen's Gate School. She appeared as the only "real" girl in the drag cabaret at Madame Jojo's from 1989 to 1991. She was vocalist alongside Hugh Lindsay (equerry to HM The Queen) in the Sweatband. In 1990 she was a featured vocalist, along with Robin Wright, on a dance version of "California Dreamin'" by the studio group The Midnight Shift, reaching no 1 in the Hi Energy charts. She sang with the jazz harmonica player Larry Adler from 1991, touring worldwide with him. She can be heard on his tribute album The Glory of Gershwin, produced by George Martin. As an actress she has appeared at the Royal National, the West End and Regents Park Open Air theatres (nominated for an Olivier Award for Best Supporting Performance for the latter's production of Kiss Me, Kate). She was cast in many television series including Waiting for God, Spooks, Trial & Retribution, Numbertime, Endeavour, The Nevers and in the films The Danish Girl, Blithe Spirit and Christopher and His Kind. She is the curator of The Festival at Hampstead Theatre, a drama and literary festival started in 2015. As a voice over artist she has worked extensively with Big Finish - productions include Dr. Who, Blake's 7, The Paternoster Gang, Survivors, Adam Adamant Lives, Star Cops, The Diary of River Song as well as radio dramas and animations.

For five years, from 1994 to 1999, Randwyck was a member of the group Fascinating Aïda, having been recommended to Dillie Keane by Victor Lownes, and was nominated for two Olivier Awards for Best Entertainment.

== Personal life ==
She is married to the director Edward Hall, with whom she worked on Spooks, Kingdom, Trial & Retribution and Partners in Crime. They have two daughters, Georgia and Savannah. Her father-in-law was the late Sir Peter Hall. Both van Randwyck and her elder daughter appeared in the TV series Kingdom in early 2008.

== Selected theatre ==
- Dirty Dancing – Aldwych Theatre
- The Go-Between – Apollo Theatre
- For Services Rendered – Watermill Theatre
- Raving, No Naughty Bits and A Further Education – Hampstead Theatre
- Aladdin – Guildford Panto, O2 and Richmond Theatre
- A Little Night Music - (Petra) and Once in a Life time – Royal National Theatre
- The Boy Friend – (Lady Brockhurst) – Menier Chocolate Factory, 2019
