= Morag Hood =

British actress (1942–2002)

- Hood as Natasha in the BBC series War and Peace (1972)
- Born: 12 December 1942; Glasgow, Scotland
- Died: 5 October 2002 (aged 59); London, England
- Occupation: Actress

Morag Hood (12 December 1942 – 5 October 2002) was a British actress who featured in numerous television programmes, stage productions, and audio presentations in the UK from the 1960s up to the late 1990s.

== Early life ==
Hood was born in Glasgow, Scotland, and attended Bellahouston Academy. She was a graduate of the University of Glasgow.

== Career ==
=== Television ===
One of Hood's earliest jobs was as a presenter of youth programmes on Scottish Television in 1963. In April 1964, she and fellow presenter Paul Young interviewed the Beatles. The interview, recorded at the Scottish Television studios in Cowcaddens, Glasgow, was thought to be lost for many years. The reel of 16mm film was found in 2008, in a rusting film can in a south London garage.

She is best known for playing Natasha Rostova in the epic 1972 BBC television adaptation of War and Peace, though several critics felt that she was miscast, and Frances Earnshaw in the 1970 film version of Wuthering Heights. She played a complaining and prideful Mary Musgrove in BBC's 1971 version of Jane Austen's Persuasion. Morag Hood appeared in numerous other British television series, including: Z-Cars, The Borderers, Bergerac (S5E7 "Thanks For Everything" as Genevieve Bichet), Jane Eyre, Families and Hamish Macbeth. Hood also appeared in an episode of Auf Wiedersehen, Pet (second series, 1986, "No Sex, Please, We're Brickies") as Joy Chatterley, an attractive local resident who ended up having a fling with Oz (Jimmy Nail). She starred in the controversial 1990 BBC1 drama A Sense of Guilt.

=== Stage ===
Hood's first stage appearance was in Sam Cree's Wedding Fever in 1964, at the Metropole in Glasgow. On London's West End, she appeared in The Servant of Two Masters in 1968, and A Streetcar Named Desire in 1974, and three David Greig plays, among other shows. She received acclaim in 2001 for her final stage performance, in A Listening Heaven, by Torben Betts, at the Royal Lyceum Theatre in Edinburgh. She was nominated for Best Actress in that year's TMA Awards.

== Personal life ==
Morag Hood died in a London hospice on 5 October 2002, from cancer, at the age of 59. She had two elder siblings: Liam Hood who was a Scottish TV executive and Eila Ferguson. She lived in Fountayne Road, Stoke Newington and for a while with the actor Martin Shaw, she never married and had no children. In her later years, she was close to musician Sting and his wife Trudie Styler and to actress Siân Phillips.
