= Fascinating Aïda =

British comedy singing group and cabaret act

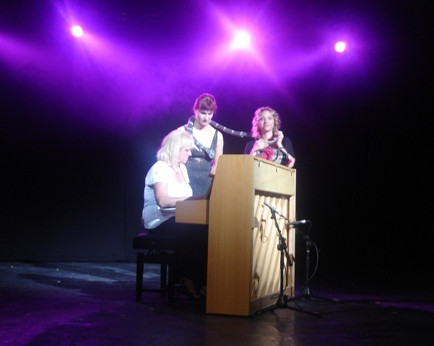
- Fascinating Aïda perform at the 2008 Edinburgh Festival Fringe.

Background information
- Origin: England
- Genres: Satirical cabaret, comedy
- Years active: 1983–1989; 1994–2004; 2008 – present
- Label: First Night Records
- Members: Dillie Keane; Adèle Anderson; Liza Pulman
- Past members: Lizzie Richardson; Marilyn Cutts; Glenda Smith; Denise Wharmby; Issy van Randwyck; Charlotte Nytzen; Sarah-Louise Young; Russell Churney
- Website: http://www.fascinatingaida.co.uk

Fascinating Aïda is a British comedy singing group and satirical cabaret act founded in March 1983. The line-up consists of founder member Dillie Keane; Adèle Anderson, who joined in 1984; and Liza Pulman, who first joined in 2004.

The group received a Perrier Award nomination at the 1984 Edinburgh Festival, and went on to be nominated three times for the Olivier Award for Best Entertainment (1995, 2000 and 2004), and twice for the Drama Desk Award for Outstanding Revue (2005 and 2010). Keane and Anderson were also nominated for the 2010 Drama Desk Award for Outstanding Lyrics.

== History ==
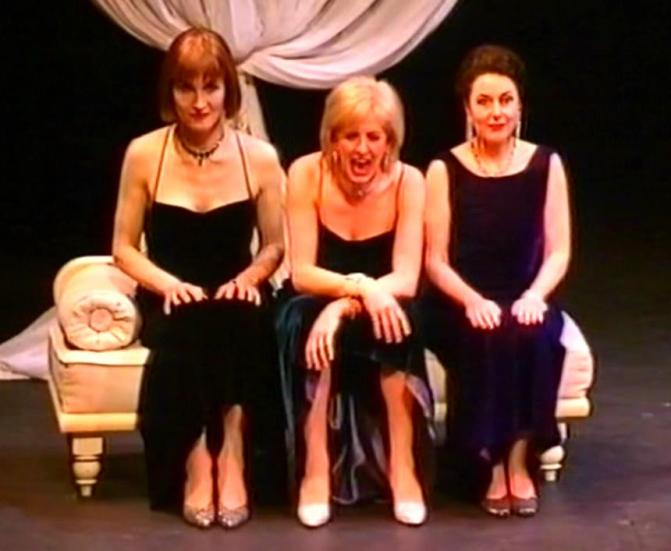
(from left to right) Adèle Anderson, Dillie Keane and Marilyn Cutts performing in Barefaced Chic! at the Lyric Hammersmith in 2000

Fascinating Aïda was founded in March 1983 by Dillie Keane, along with Marilyn Cutts and Lizzie Richardson. The members have varied frequently, but the central two have been Adèle Anderson – who joined the group in 1984 – and Keane. The trio started performing in a West End wine bar, but they soon caught the attention of the media and performed on television for the first time in July 1983.

Over the years they gained a growing fanbase and national popularity, earning three Olivier Award nominations for Best Entertainment, in 1995, 2000 and 2004. They were voted 'Most Popular Act 1985' by City Limits magazine, and also earned a Perrier Comedy Award nomination. The group broke up in 1989 and subsequently reformed in 1994, performing for a further ten years, releasing a number of albums, before breaking up again in 2004. Their 20th anniversary show, One Last Flutter, ran from 13 November to 6 December 2003 at the Comedy Theatre in London, when original member Marilyn Cutts joined the group for one last time. The show earned the group their third Olivier Award nomination.

Liza Pulman joined in early 2004. That year, the group performed their show Absolutely Fabulous twice in New York – first in June for the Brits Off-Broadway Festival, then from September to November at the Acorn Theatre, Manhattan. The show earned them a 2005 Drama Desk Award nomination for Outstanding Revue. In 2007, Keane stated on the welcome page on the Fascinating Aïda official website that "Next year will be our 25th anniversary so we really want to do a new show to celebrate".

The group wrote songs for radio and television programmes such as Stop The Week, After Hours, People Like Us and the breakfast broadcaster TV-am. Some of their most famous songs include Shattered Illusions, Herpes Tango, Lieder and Taboo. They were the subject of several BBC documentaries. All the current members are also established actresses, mainly in musical theatre. Dillie Keane is also a writer, having written a column in The Stage magazine for ten years, and written two books, The Joy of Sequins in 1995 and Fascinating Who? in 1985. Keane says she now spends her time "juggling acting, cabaret and writing". The group had an official mascot—a pure bred Irish Setter called "Dillie", born in 1999.

After the death in 2007 of the group's pianist and musical director Russell Churney, plans for a new show were shelved. It was announced in early March 2008 that they would get together again for a short spell of concerts and possibly a brief tour to celebrate their 25th anniversary, and the show would include new songs. In 2008 they performed at the Jermyn Street Theatre, followed by three nationwide tours. They have been described as "Absolutely Fabulous meets Noël Coward, as sung by the Andrew Sisters [sic]."

On 6 April 2009, Fascinating Aïda released a new album followed by a DVD called "Silver Jubilee" in July 2010, filmed at the Theatre Royal, Windsor. They brought the show to New York in their show which was entitled "Absolutely Miraculous", and was nominated for two Drama Desk Awards on 3 May 2010. They completed a tour of South Africa and then opened successfully in the Charing Cross Theatre in the autumn of 2011, before starting a UK tour.

The 40th Anniversary Show tour began in 2023 and continued into 2024, including three nights at the London Palladium in February 2024.

=== Adaptations ===
Camille O'Sullivan is known for having in the past performed her own rendition of Fascinating Aïda's Look Mummy No Hands, as is punk cabaret singer Amanda Palmer. Patti LuPone has recorded Look Mummy No Hands and Shattered Illusions on her album Matters of the Heart, and sang them at her solo show in New York in 2000. Shattered Illusions is also a staple song of Bette Midler.

== Current and previous members ==
=== Current members ===
- Dillie Keane: 1983–1989, 1994–2004, 2008–present (contralto)
- Adèle Anderson: 1984–1989, 1994–2004, 2008–present (contralto)
- Liza Pulman: 2004, 2008 – July 2011, July 2012–present (soprano)

=== Previous members ===
- Lizzie Richardson: March 1983 – October 1983 (soprano)
- Marilyn Cutts: March 1983 – March 1986, 1999 – 2004 (mezzo 1983, soprano from 1984 on)
- Glenda Smith: October 1983 – January 1984 (soprano)
- Denise Wharmby: August 1986 – April 1989 (soprano)
- Lesley-Anne Knight: 1989–1990
- Issy van Randwyck: February 1994 – July 1999 (soprano)
- Charlotte Nytzen: October 1999, February 2000 (soprano)
- Bonnie Langford: March 2004 (soprano)
- Sarah-Louise Young: 2009 – 2010 (soprano)

Fascinating Aïda has also in the past been joined by Tony Award-winning orchestrator Sarah Travis.

== Tour history ==
Fascinating Aïda have appeared in over 100 theatres in the United Kingdom and Ireland as well as numerous tours to other countries.

=== National tours and residencies ===
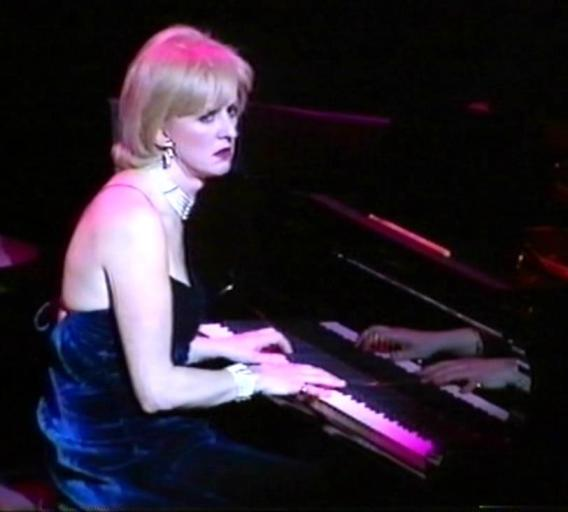
Dillie Keane performing in Barefaced Chic! in 2000

- 1984 Fascinating Aïda – Donmar Warehouse, London. The show ran from 11 December 1984 to 5 January 1985
- 1985 Fascinating Aïda – Lyric Hammersmith, London
- 1986 Fascinating Aïda – Lyric Hammersmith
- 1987 Fascinating Aïda – Piccadilly Theatre, West End, London. The show ran from 19 February to 3 April
- 1989 Fascinating Aïda – Lyric Hammersmith
- 1994 Fascinating Aïda – Lyric Hammersmith
- 1994 Fascinating Aïda – Garrick Theatre, West End, London. The show ran from 7 December 1994 to 21 January 1995
- 1997 Fascinating Aïda – Apollo Theatre, West End, London. The show ran from 4 to 15 March
- 1997 It, Wit, Don't Give A Shit Girls – Vaudeville Theatre, West End, London. The show ran from 23 January to 15 February
- 1997 It, Wit, Don't Give A Shit Girls – Lyric Hammersmith. The show ran from 4 to 15 March
- 1998 It, Wit, Don't Give A Shit Girls – Lyric Hammersmith
- 1999 Barefaced Chic – Theatre Royal, Haymarket, West End, London. The show ran from 9 February to 13 March
- 2000 Barefaced Chic – Lyric Hammersmith
- 2003 One Last Flutter – Comedy Theatre, West End, London. The show ran from 13 November to 6 December

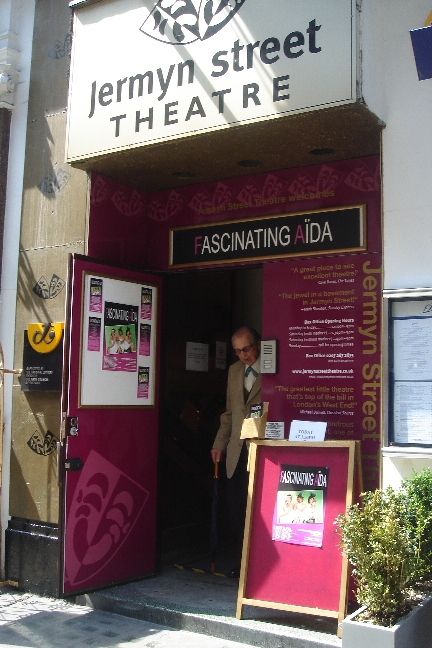
Jermyn Street Theatre, taken 24 May 2008, with Fascinating Aïda performing

- 2008 Silver Jubilee – Jermyn Street Theatre, London. The show ran from 19 to 31 May. Also small national tour.
- 2009 25th Anniversary – National tour
- 2011–2012 Cheap Flights Tour – National tour
- 2013–2014 Charm Offensive – National tour
- 2019–2022 – National Tour, interrupted by Covid.
- 2023–2024 40th Anniversary Show – National Tour, ends March 2024

==== 2008 mini-tour ====
In 2008, Fascinating Aïda had their "Silver Jubilee Concert", celebrating 25 years of Fascinating Aïda. The group performed several weeks in London's Jermyn Street Theatre, and the run included new numbers. They received positive reviews for their performances.

Following their run, they performed in various venues over England, including at the Chichester Festival, the Cheltenham Festival, The Oundle Festival, Aldeburgh, The Harleston and Waveney Festival and the Edinburgh Festival Fringe. They also performed in Concert for Russell, which commemorated the life of ex-FA member Russell Churney, who died from pancreatic cancer in 2007.

==== 2009 national tour ====
Fascinating Aïda embarked on a full scale national tour of the Silver Jubilee show, preceding their autumn tour and New York residency.

=== International tours and residencies ===
- 1988 One month season – Ballroom, West 28th Street, New York City, United States
- 1998 Small National tour – Australia
- 1999 Two performances – Hemingways Resort, Watamu, Kenya
- 1999 Three week season – Bar Jeder Vernunft, Berlin, Germany
- 2000 Season - Raffles Hotel, Singapore
- 2003 Red Pear Theatre, Antibes, France, September to October
- 2004 Fascinating Aida – Mofet Theatre, Raanana, Israel
- 2004 Absolutely Fascinating – 59E59 Theaters, Manhattan, New York City, United States, as part of the Brits Off Broadway Festival of New British Theatre.
- 2004 Absolutely Fascinating – Acorn Theatre, Manhattan, New York. The show ran from 22 September to 14 November
- Additionally, they performed at the Wellington Festival in New Zealand, a four-week season at the Firebird Cafe in New York and a later return two-week season at the Firebird Cafe as well as a performance at the New York Cabaret Convention. In 1988 they opened the Sydney Festival for the Bicentennial at the Opera House and played a 4-week season as well as a national tour. They did a further four-week season in New York, a seven-week season at the Mason Street Theater in San Francisco and in 1986 performed at the Sydney Festival and completed a small national tour of Australia.
- 2009/10 Absolutely Miraculous – 59E59. Fascinating Aida performed in New York as part of the Brits Off-Broadway season, winning two Drama Desk Award nominations.

== Discography ==
Fascinating Aïda have released eleven albums and five videos.

=== Albums ===
- 1984 – Sweet FA
- 1987 – A Load of Old Sequins
- 1994 – Live at the Lyric
- 1997 – It, Wit, Don't Give A Shit Girls
- 1999 – Barefaced Chic
- 2003 – Absolutely Fascinating
- 2003 – One Last Flutter
- 2009 – Silver Jubilee
- 2012 – Cheap Flights
- 2014 – Charm Offensive
- 2016 – Back in the Saddle

=== DVDs ===
- 2009 – Silver Jubilee
- 2012 – Cheap Flights (Release Date: Monday 7 May 2012)
- 2014 – Charm Offensive
- 2016 – Back in the Saddle (Greatest Hits) (Released 9 December 2016)
- 2017 – Hello Dillie (Released 25 February 2017)

== Selected awards & nominations ==
- Drama Desk Award
  - Nominated for Best Entertainment – 2005
  - Nominated for Best Entertainment – 2010 (Absolutely Miraculous!)
  - Nominated for Best Lyrics – 2010 (Absolutely Miraculous!)
- Olivier Awards
  - Nominated for Best Entertainment – 1995 (Live at the Lyric)
  - Nominated for Best Entertainment – 2000 (Barefaced Chic)
  - Nominated for Best Entertainment – 2004 (One Last Flutter)
- Perrier Award (Edinburgh Festival Fringe)
  - Nominated – 1984
- City Limits
  - Voted Most Popular Act – 1985

=== Reviews ===
The Independent gave the 2003 One Last Flutter show four stars, naming it a "perfectly judged evening", and IndieLondon said that "One Last Flutter is as good and funny and as full of biting wit and humour as ever." The West End Whingers were unanimously praising their 2008 Jermyn Street Theatre run. The New York Times said of their Absolutely Fascinating run: "I hope every cabaret singer looking for new material sees this show. Any young musical-theater performer who wants to see the right blend of subtlety and showmanship should too. The rest of us can savor the strong opinions and sharp wits that can make top-notch entertainment."

Other reviews include The Daily Telegraph, who said that "quite simply, Fascinating Aïda are the tops"; the News of the World, who said that "they are more than ever quite irresistible" and "simply hilarious"; The Financial Times who said that they are "one of the most exquisitely polished shows you are ever likely to see", and The Sunday Telegraph said that their show was "brilliantly conceived and executed... The music is worth hearing again and again".

Their 2009 show was reviewed by acclaimed film director Ken Russell in The Times, who said that watching them made him feel he had "died and gone to heaven", and that the trio were "impossibly good".

== Books ==
Fascinating Aïda have released two books.

- Keane, Dillie; Anderson, Adele (October 1986). Fascinating Who?, Elm Tree Books, ISBN 0-241-11925-1
- Keane, Dillie (December 1994). The Joy of Sequins, Methuen Publishing Ltd, ISBN 0-413-69110-1
