= Barbara Young (actress) =

English actress (1931–2023)

- Born: 9 February 1931; Brighouse, West Riding of Yorkshire, England
- Died: 27 April 2023 (aged 92); Cambridge, England
- Occupation: Actress
- Years active: 1957–2018
- Notable work: Coronation Street; Family Affairs; I, Claudius; Last of the Summer Wine
- Spouse: Jack Pulman (m. 1956; died 1979)
- Children: 2, including Liza Pulman

Barbara Young (9 February 1931 – 27 April 2023) was an English actress. She is known for her role as the future Emperor Nero's mother, Agrippinilla, in the landmark 1976 BBC serial I, Claudius.

== Early life and education ==
Barbara Young was born on 9 February 1931 in Brighouse to Dora (née Ratcliffe) and Jack Young.

While training to be an actor at Bradford Civic Theatre, one of her teachers, Rudolph Laban, recommended her to Joan Littlewood who ran the Theatre Workshop. After joining the company in 1951, Young lodged with fellow Theatre Workshop actor Harry H. Corbett in Wythenshawe.

== Career ==
In 1956, Young made her West End debut in Peter Myers' revue For Amusement Only at the Apollo Theatre.

Young also played Miss Scatcherd in the 1970 film of Jane Eyre, Eileen Clancy in the 1975 TV series Looking for Clancy, and Dot Wilmington in the TV series Hazell. She appeared in On Giant's Shoulders for the BBC in 1979.

She played the long-running role of gossipy yet lovable Sadie Hargreaves Lloyd in the soap opera Family Affairs. Sadie, a former theatre actress turned barmaid, was a key figure in the show from 1998 until 2005, making her one of the show's longest-serving characters.

Young previously acted in the soap opera Coronation Street in the early 1960s, 1980s and 1990s. In February 2007 she rejoined the cast of Coronation Street, this time as Doreen Fenwick, an old friend of Rita Sullivan.

She appeared in two episodes of Midsomer Murders: the 1997 pilot episode "The Killings at Badger's Drift" and the 2006 episode "Last Year's Model".

In 2008 Young made a guest appearance in "Get Out of That, Then", an episode of the long-running BBC comedy series Last of the Summer Wine, as Bobby Ball's wife Florrie. Following the departure of Kathy Staff from the series in 2008 Young joined the regular cast as Nora Batty's sister, Stella.

She appeared in Hollyoaks playing Mags (Nan to Scott Sabeka) from 10 to 13 April 2012. Her final television appearance was in 2016, when she played Connie Templeton in an episode of the BBC soap opera Doctors.

== Personal life and death ==
In 1956, Young married screenwriter Jack Pulman. They had two daughters together, singer Liza Pulman and actress Cory Pulman. Pulman died in 1979 from a heart attack.

Young died at Addenbrooke's Hospital in Cambridge on 27 April 2023, at the age of 92.

== Filmography ==
Year	Film	Role	Notes
1957	On Stage - London	—N/a	TV series (Episode #1.1)
1960	Fred Emney Picks a Pop	Waitress	TV film
1960	BBC Sunday-Night Play	Nancy	TV mini-series (1 episode: "The Chopping Block")
1960	Bootsie and Snudge	Rosemary	TV series (1 episode: "The Blind Date")
1960, 1961	Armchair Theatre	Sheila / Flo	TV series (2 episodes)
1961	Emergency-Ward 10	Maida Crosby	TV series (Episode #1.452)
1961	ITV Play of the Week	Clare	TV series (1 episode: "The Primitive")
1961, 1982, 1991, 2007	Coronation Street	Betty Ridgeway / Dorothy Stockwell / Barbara Platt / Doreen Fenwick	TV series (60 episodes)
1962	Crying Down the Lane	Pat	TV mini-series (Episode #1.3)
1962	No Hiding Place	Jean Haven / Sharron Webb	TV series (2 episodes)
1962	Bulldog Breed	Miss Wilson	TV series (1 episode: "The New Garage")
1965	Pardon the Expression	Pam Plummer	TV series (3 episodes)
1966	Dr. Kildare	Saleslady	TV series (1 episode: "No Other Road")
1966	Homicide	Nancy Coleman	TV series (1 episode: "What Milk Train?")
1968	The Root of All Evil?	Jacky	TV series (1 episode: "You Can Only Buy Once")
1970	Jane Eyre	Miss Scatcherd	TV film
1972	War & Peace	Anna Scherer	TV mini-series (2 episodes)
1972	Nearest and Dearest	Woman in Doctor's	TV series (1 episode: "A Place in the Sun")
1972	The Main Chance	Hilda Walker	TV series (1 episode: "Where Did I Leave My Shining Armour?")
1972, 1973	ITV Playhouse	Nancy / Nora	TV series (2 episodes)
1972, 1976, 1979	Play for Today	Greta / Typing Pool Supervisor / Maggie	TV series (3 episodes)
1973	Public Eye	Madge Reading	TV series (1 episode: "Home and Away")
1973	Crown Court	Sheila Telfer / Grace Moresby	TV series (5 episodes)
1973	Love Story	Audrey	TV series (1 episode: "Audrey Had a Little Lamb")
1974	How's Your Father?	Doreen Cropper	TV series (7 episodes)
1975	Looking for Clancy	Eileen Clancy	TV series (3 episodes)
1976	Angels	Mrs. Overton	TV series (1 episode: "Accident")
1976	I, Claudius	Agrippinilla	TV series (1 episode: "Old King Log")
1978	Hazell	Dot Wilmington	TV series (9 episodes)
1979	BBC2 Play of the Week	Teacher at Hospital	TV series (1 episode: "On Giant's Shoulders")
1979	Crime and Punishment	Mme. Lippevechsel	TV series (2 episodes)
1979	Bless Me Father	Miss Davenport	TV series (1 episode: "Fatal Lady")
1980	Brothers and Sisters	Unnamed	Feature film, (Voice role)
1980–1981	The Good Companions	Mrs. Oakroyd	TV mini-series (3 episodes)
1982	The Gentle Touch	Paula Ferris	TV series (1 episode: "Right of Entry")
1983	Praying Mantis	Solicitor's Secretary	TV film
1985	White City	Mother	Feature film
1986	Dempsey and Makepeace	Miriam Powell	TV series (1 episode: "Mantrap")
1986, 1993, 1996	The Bill	Mrs. Lindfield / Gladys Ellis / Julie Hedges	TV series (3 episodes)
1987	A Dorothy L Sayers Mystery	Mrs. Lefranc	TV series (3 episodes)
1987	Hidden City	Woman in Film Disposal Office	Feature Film
1987	A Perfect Spy	Sal	TV mini-series (1 episode: "Episode #1.6")
1988	Witness	Gran	TV series documentary (1 episode: "Linda's Secret")
1991	Sleepers	Elsie	TV series (3 episodes)
1991	All Good Things	Hetty Wilson	TV series (4 episodes)
1992	Virtual Murder	Rita	TV series (1 episode: "A Touch for Silverado")
1993	Lovejoy	Belinda Stroud	TV series (1 episode: "The Lost Colony")
1994	The Memoirs of Sherlock Holmes	Susan	TV mini-series (1 episode: "The Three Gables")
1995	The Vacillations of Poppy Carew	Mrs. Frobisher	TV film
1995	Casualty	Carmen	TV series (1 episode: "Halfway House")
1995	Cracker	Helen McIlvanney	TV series (1 episode: "Brotherly Love: Part 1")
1997	The Broker's Man	Mrs. Parkinson	TV series (1 episode: "Dangerous Bends: Part 1")
1997, 2006	Midsomer Murders	Anne Quine / Gwen Trevelyan	TV series (2 episodes)
1998–2005	Family Affairs	Sadie Hargreaves/Sadie Lloyd	TV series (168 episodes)
1999	Four Fathers	Janice Yallop	TV series
2006, 2011	Holby City	Bridie Passmore / Oona Prichard	TV series (2 episodes)
2006, 2010, 2016	Doctors	Miss Barnett / Joan Darlington / Connie Templeton	TV series (3 episodes)
2008–2010	Last of the Summer Wine	Stella / Florrie	TV series (18 episodes)
2010	Sailor Boy	Eileen	Short
2012	Hollyoaks	Nan	TV series (4 episodes)
2015	Orna	Esther	Short
2018	The Keeper	Grandma Sarah	Feature film
