= War and Peace (1972 TV series) =

British television dramatisation of the 1869 novel War and Peace

- DVD cover
- Genre: Historical drama
- Created by: David Conroy
- Based on: War and Peace by Leo Tolstoy
- Written by: Jack Pulman
- Directed by: John Davies
- Starring: Anthony Hopkins; Alan Dobie; Morag Hood; Angela Down
- Theme music composer: Alexei Lvov
- Countries of origin: United Kingdom, Yugoslavia
- Original language: English
- No. of seasons: 1
- No. of episodes: 20

Production
- Producer: David Conroy
- Production locations: UK: Kedleston Hall; Black Park; Luton Hoo; Ragley Hall; Doddington Hall, Lincolnshire; Wrest Park; Yugoslavia: Bela Crkva; Novi Sad; Zlatibor
- Camera setup: Multi-camera
- Running time: 44–45 minutes per episode 14 hours 50 minutes total
- Production companies: BBC; Time Life Television; Yugoslav Films Belgrade

Original release
- Network: BBC2
- Release: 30 September 1972 – 8 February 1973

War and Peace is a British television dramatisation of the 1869 Leo Tolstoy novel War and Peace. This 20-episode series began on 28 September 1972. The BBC dramatisation of Tolstoy's epic story of love and loss set against the backdrop of the Napoleonic Wars. Anthony Hopkins heads the cast as Pierre Bezukhov, Morag Hood is Natasha Rostova, Alan Dobie is Andrei Bolkonsky and David Swift is Napoleon, whose decision to invade Russia in 1812 has far-reaching consequences for each of them and their families.

The twenty-part serial was produced by David Conroy and directed by John Davies. Conroy's aim was to transfer the characters and plot from Tolstoy's novel to television drama to run for a duration of 15 hours. Scripted by Jack Pulman, this version of War and Peace contained battle sequences, which were filmed in Yugoslavia. The theme tune is the Russian imperial anthem, played by the band of the Welsh Guards.

Hopkins received the British Academy Television Award for Best Actor for his performance, and the production designer Don Homfray won a BAFTA for his work on the series.

== Production ==
War and Peace followed the success of such literary adaptations as The Forsyte Saga (BBC2, 1967).

Charlie Knode designed the costumes.

The production took three years (1969–1972) and involved location filming in SR Serbia of Yugoslavia and at English stately homes. Several scenes were shot at Petrovaradin Fortress in Novi Sad. Soldiers of the Yugoslav Territorial Defense appeared as extras in battle scenes.

== Cast ==
- Anthony Hopkins as Pierre Bezukhov
- Alan Dobie as Andrei Nikolayevich Bolkonsky
- Morag Hood as Natasha Rostova
- Angela Down as Maria Bolkonskaya
- Rupert Davies as Count Ilya Rostov
- Faith Brook as Countess Natalie Rostova
- David Swift as Napoleon Bonaparte
- Frank Middlemass as Mikhail Kutuzov
- Sylvester Morand as Nikolai Rostov
- Joanna David as Sonya
- Harry Locke as Platon Karataev
- Donald Douglas as Tsar Alexander I of Russia
- John Cazabon as Barclay de Tolly
- Fiona Gaunt as Hélène Kuragina, wife of Pierre Bezukhov
- Anthony Jacobs as Prince Nikolay Bolkonsky, father of Andrei and Marya
- Athene Fielding as Mademoiselle Bourienne, companion to Marya
- Barnaby Shaw and Rufus Frampton as Petya Rostov
- Peter Bathurst as Pfuhl
- Morris Perry as Joseph Fouché
- Geoffrey Morris as Napoleon's secretary
- Michael Gover as General Balashev
- Toby Bridge as young Nikolenka Bolkonsky
- Neil Stacy as Boris Drubetskoy
- Anne Blake as Princess Drubetskoya
- Gary Watson as Denisov
- Donald Burton as Dolokhov
- Tony Steedman as Marshal Davout
- Joseph Wise as Russian officer
- Colin Baker as Anatole Kuragin
- Basil Henson as Prince Vasili Kuragin
- Josie Kidd as Katishe
- James Appleby as German adjutant
- Gerard Hely as Prince Murat
- Michael Billington as Lt. Berg
- Will Leighton as Tikhon
- Patricia Shakesby as Vera Rostova, married to Berg
- Alison Frazer as Princess Lisa Bolkonskya
- Colin Fisher as Telyanin
- John Breslin as Marshal Berthier
- Pat Gorman as French Sergeant
- Philip Lowrie as French Captain
- Edmund Bailey as Prokofy
- Hugh Cross as Mitenka
- Richard Poore as French messenger
- Barbara Young as Anna Scherer
- Karin MacCarthy as Julie Karagin
- Maurice Quick as Pavel
- Roy Spencer as Timohin
- Hubert Cross as General Rapp
- Geoffrey Denton as Host
- Tenniel Evans as Prince Bagration
- Gordon Faith as Galitsyn
- John Lawrence as Anna's guest
- Judith Pollard as Olga
- Edith Sharpe as Madame Scherer
- Tony Caunter as French Corporal
- Erik Chitty as Gerasim

== Episodes ==
No.	Title	Original release date
1	"Name Day"	30 September 1972
1805. The Rostovs celebrate the name day of Natasha and Countess Rostova. The family of the dying Count Bezukhov fret over who will inherit.
2	"Sounds of War"	7 October 1972
Pierre Bezukhov comes to terms with his large inheritance and life in high society. Andrei Bolkonsky leaves his pregnant wife and goes away to war
3	"Skirmish at Schöngraben"	14 October 1972
Napoleon's armies make rapid progress across Europe, winning a victory at Schöngrabern.
4	"A Letter and Two Proposals"	21 October 1972
The Rostov family receive news of war from Nikolai. Vasili Kuragin tries to marry his daughter to Pierre and his son to Maria Bolkonskaya.
5	"Austerlitz"	28 October 1972
Preparations are take place for the Battle of Austerlitz.
6	"Reunions"	4 November 1972
Nikolai Rostov returns home from war; Pierre struggles in his marriage.
7	"New Beginnings"	11 November 1972
1807. Pierre suspects his wife of infidelity. France and Russia make peace at Tilsit.
8	"A Beautiful Tale"	18 November 1972
Andrei visits the Rostovs. Tsar Alexander I attends a ball, and romance blossoms between Andrei and Natasha.
9	"Leave of Absence"	25 November 1972
Andrei proposes to Natasha. Nikolai Rostov returns for extended leave.
10	"Madness"	2 December 1972
Natasha Rostova pays a visit to the Bolkonskys.
11	"Men of Destiny"	9 December 1972
1812: Napoleon invades Russia. Pierre cannot decide whether to join the army or not.
12	"Fortunes of War"	16 December 1972
The French advance and the Russians retreat; Nikolai rescues Maria from a peasant uprising.
13	"Borodino"	23 December 1972
The citizens of Moscow are forced to decide whether to abandon the city or not. At Borodino both sides take heavy losses.
14	"Escape"	30 December 1972
The aftermath of Borodino. The Rostovs evacuate wounded soldiers from Moscow – Andrei among them.
15	"Moscow!"	6 January 1973
Napoleon takes Moscow, but the war is not won yet. Pierre imagines that he is destined to kill the Emperor.
16	"Two Meetings"	13 January 1973
Nikolai must decide between Maria and Sonya. Natasha nurses the dying Andrei.
17	"Of Life and Death"	20 January 1973
Pierre is arrested; Sonya writes a letter releasing Nikolai.
18	"The Retreat"	27 January 1973
Napoleon retreats from Moscow. Pierre is caught up in the trek with French soldiers and comes close to death.
19	"The Road to Life"	1 February 1973
Maria tries to rouse Natasha out from her mourning. Pierre returns home.
20	"An Epilogue"	8 February 1973
1820. Pierre and Natasha are married with children, while the Nikolai-Maria-Sonya triangle is resolved.

== Reception ==
According to Dr. Lez Cooke in British Television Drama: A History (2003), War and Peace consolidated BBC2 as the channel responsible for 'quality' literary drama.

In The New Yorker in 2016, Louis Menand wrote, "It drags in parts today, but in 1972 no one had seen television that grand or ambitious before. The length—almost fifteen hours—meant the series could include scenes, like the wolf hunt, or Denisov dancing the mazurka, that are dramatically superfluous but thematically vital. The acting is inspired, in part because the casting was inspired, from Anthony Hopkins, as Pierre, to David Swift, as a pint-sized, swaggering Napoleon. Everyone looks just the way he or she's supposed to look."

Clive James criticised some performances: "I was cruel to Morag Hood when I said that her performance made me want to throw a tarpauline over her and peg down the corners. I should have blamed the director, who had obviously told her to bounce up and down at all times in order to convey exuberance. [...] In that same production, Alan Dobie as Andrei was grim enough to send you to sleep, but Anthony Hopkins was a perfect Pierre: a real tribute to his acting, because his default mode is to be in command."

Paul Mavis (DVD Talk) awarded it 4 stars, saying, "It positively luxuriates in its expansive format, giving the viewer a remarkable chance to fully experience the various nuances of character and the myriad permutations of shifting relationships (as well as Tolstoy's numerous plot coincidences) that mark this mammoth work." He praised Alan Dobie as "uniformed in Byronic splendor [...] spot-on as the dour, heroic, closed-off Andrei Bolkonsky", also praising Angela Down (Maria) and Sylvester Morand (Nikolai). However, he criticised Hood's performance, saying, "the casting of Morag Hood (which, according to the production history included in this DVD set, was a desperate, last-minute decision) is a distressing misfire. [...] poor Hood can't begin to approach the character with even a modicum of believability. Natasha begins the story as a wild, impetuous girl of thirteen - an age and a temperament that Hood evidently felt needed to be delineated by having Natasha laugh insanely at everything while leaping about like a mad thing (Hood is also far too old to be a believable 13-year-old). As for later maturing into this bewitching, erotic little beauty whom all men adore, either an actress has that innate, inexplicable quality or they don't - you can't 'act' that powerful allure onto the screen. It has to come from within, and simply put, Hood doesn't have it."

Andrew D. Kaufman, in his book Give War and Peace a Chance: Tolstoyan Wisdom for Troubled Times said that this version had "much to recommend", although he preferred the 1966–67 Soviet film. James Monaco called it "easily the best adaptation [...] in any medium" in How to Read a Film: The World of Movies, Media, Multimedia: Language, History, Theory (1977).

== DVD release ==
The series was released in a Region 2 4-DVD boxset by DD Home Entertainment in 2005. The set is accompanied by an illustrated booklet, written by Andy Priestner, which provides a detailed account of how the series was made. In 2009 Simply Home Entertainment released a 5-disc edition with 200 production stills.

== See also ==
- War and Peace (1956 film), version directed by King Vidor
- War and Peace (1966–67 film), Soviet-produced version, directed by Sergei Bondarchuk
- War & Peace (2016 TV series)
