= David Conroy =

British television producer

David Conroy (born 11 April 1937) is a British television producer.

Conroy worked as a production assistant on early episodes of Doctor Who. In the late 1960s and early 1970s, he was the producer of classic serials for BBC Two. He is noted for producing dramatisations of historical novels, including The Woman in White (1966), Wuthering Heights (1967), Vanity Fair (1967), The Portrait of a Lady (1968), Middlemarch (1968), Nana (1968), The Roads to Freedom (1970), and War and Peace (1972). He produced the 1982 television adaptation of The Scarlet Pimpernel, and in 1990 produced the TV series and film Vincent & Theo, directed by Robert Altman.
