= Liza Pulman =

British singer and actress (born 1969)

- Pulman performing with Fascinating Aïda in 2008.
- Born: 1969 (age 55–56); Westminster, London, England
- Occupation(s): Actress, Singer, Musician
- Spouse(s): David Ganly (divorced) Steve Hutt
- Parents: Jack Pulman (father); Barbara Young (mother)
- Awards: Nominated for 2005 & 2010 Drama Desk Award with Fascinating Aïda
- Website: http://www.lizapulman.com/

Liza Kate Pulman (born 1969) is a British singer and actress. She is one third of the satirical comedy trio Fascinating Aïda which received Drama Desk Award nominations in 2005 and 2010.

== Biography ==
=== Early life ===
Born in 1969 in Westminster, Pulman is the daughter of the actress Barbara Young and the screenwriter Jack Pulman. She has an older sister, Cory, and when they were teenagers they sang together as "the Pulman Sisters", singing numbers from the Roaring Twenties through to the 1940s in the foyers of the Royal Festival Hall and the National Theatre. Pulman then trained at the Guildhall School of Music and Drama for six years and was taken on as a junior principal with the Glyndebourne Chorus.

=== Personal life ===
Pulman married firstly the Irish-born actor David Ganly and secondly Steve Hutt, the manager of Fascinating Aïda. She lives in Cornwall with her husband.

Pulman was on the London Underground train which was bombed in the 7 July 2005 London bombings; her mobile phone footage of the experience was broadcast on international television, and her article was published in the G2 section of The Guardian.

=== Career ===
Pulman appeared in The Gondoliers and The Coffee House at the Chichester Festival Theatre. Her acting credits include her portrayal of Violet in the London Palladium's production of Chitty Chitty Bang Bang, and she starred opposite Phillip Schofield and Russ Abbot in the British national tour of Doctor Dolittle.

She has also played Cathy in Wuthering Heights (European tour), Eurydice in the world premiere of Harrison Birtwistle's The Second Mrs. Kong (Glyndebourne Festival Opera), and leading roles with Music Theatre London, the D'Oyly Carte Opera Company and the Carl Rosa Opera Company. Her many cabaret performances include Listen Up! with composer and lyricist Jason Carr. She appeared in Dick Whittington at the Watford Palace Theatre from November 2008 to January 2009.

In 2016, Pulman toured with her solo show 'Liza Pulman Sings Hollywood'. In 2017 she created the solo show "Liza Pulman Sings Streisand" which she continued to tour in 2018. This played to sell-out houses and had 5-Star reviews at numerous theatres, including London's Cadogan Hall, Wilton's Music Hall, Andrew Lloyd-Webber's The Other Palace, and a run at the Lyric Theatre on Shaftesbury Avenue. In 2021 Pulman's new show "The Heart of It" had to be postponed until April 2022, when it opened at the Riverside Studios, Hammersmith, together with the release of her new album recorded at Peter Gabriel's Real World Studios, produced by Chris Porter. In 2021 and 2022 she again toured with Fascinating Aida around the British Isles.

==== Fascinating Aïda ====
Pulman joined Fascinating Aïda in 2004 and has sung in their albums, including Absolutely Fascinating, and in the DVD Silver Jubilee. As a member of Fascinating Aïda, she received a Drama Desk Award nomination in 2005 for the group's performances in New York. In 2015, she was touring England with Charm Offensive Fascinating Aïda, soon after the group had completed a new CD and DVD called Cheap Flights. In August 2016 it had a run at the Edinburgh Festival Fringe called 'Back in the Saddle' and released a DVD and CD.

== Credits ==
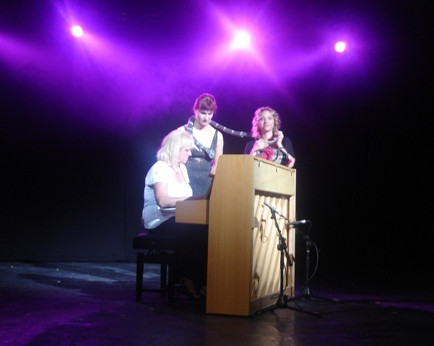
Fascinating Aïda performing in 2008.

- 2022 "Liza Pulman The Heart of It," Riverside Studios, Joseph Atkins
- 2021–2022 Fascinating Aïda, Brand New Show, UK Tour, Paul Foster
- 2017–2018 "Liza Pulman Sings Streisand"
- 2016, Fascinating Aïda, "Back in the Saddle", Fringe
- 2016, "Liza Pulman Sings Hollywood"
- 2013, Fascinating Aïda, Charm Offensive, UK tour, Pip Broughton
- 2013, Stage, Amanda, Sleeping Arrangements, Landor Theatre, Rob McWhir
- 2011, Stage, Lead, Let's Misbehave, Salisbury Playhouse, Simon Green
- 2011, Stage, Margaret, Molly Wobbly's Tit Factory, Lyric, Belfast, Paul Boyd
- 2011, Stage, Company, Mean Time (Workshop), Menier Chocolate Factory, Jonathan Butterell
- 2011, Stage, Fairy Godmother, Pericles, Regents Park Open Air Theatre, Natalie Abrahami
- 2010, Fascinating Aïda, Pearls before Wine, UK tour, Frank Thompson
- 2009, Fascinating Aïda, Absolutely Miraculous, UK tour, Frank Thompson
- 2008, Fairy Bowbells, Dick Whittington, Watford Palace Theatre, Joyce Branagh
- 2008, Fascinating Aïda, UK tour, Frank Thompson
- 2008, The Black & White Ball, King's Head Theatre, Matthew White
- 2007, The Mother, Take Flight, Menier Chocolate Factory, Sam Buntrock
- 2007, Mrs Lindburgh, Take Flight, Menier Chocolate Factory, Sam Buntrock
- 2007, Mrs Darling, Peter Pan, QDOS/Bristol Hippodrome
- 2006, Little Red Riding Hood, Into the Woods, Derby Playhouse, Karen Louise Hebbdon
- 2006, Midsomer Murders, TV series, episode "Dance With the Dead", as a 1940s crooner.
- 2006, Fascinating Aïda, Absolutely Fabulous, Theater Row, 42nd Street, New York, Simon Green
- 2005, Fanny in Fanny (Sadler's Wells, Lost Musicals Season)
- Violet in the original cast of Chitty Chitty Bang Bang (London Palladium)
- 2003, Tessa in The Gondoliers Chichester Festival Theatre
- Nephew's Wife in A Christmas Carol (Chichester Festival Theatre)
- Emma Fairfax in Doctor Dolittle opposite Phillip Schofield (UK tour)
- Mrs Darling in Peter Pan (Swindon)
- Goldilocks in Who's Afraid of the Big Bad Book (Soho Theatre)
- Lady Nelson in Nelson The Musical (Soho Theatre)
- Maid Marian in Robin Hood (Nuffield Theatre, Southampton)
- 2003, Vittoria in The Coffee House (Minerva, Chichester)
- Tatyana in Eugene Onegin
- Adele in Die Fledermaus (Lyric Hammersmith/Tour)
- Cathy in Wuthering Heights (European Tour)
- 1998, Brenda Blossom in Hollywood Pinafore (Barbican Cinema 1)
- Belinda in Otherwise Engaged (Perth Rep)
- Yum-Yum in The Mikado (Carla Rosa, Richmond Theatre, Tour)
- Gabrielle in La Vie Parisienne (D'Oyly Carte)

== See also ==
- Dillie Keane
- Adèle Anderson
