= The Second Mrs Kong =

- Opera by Harrison Birtwistle
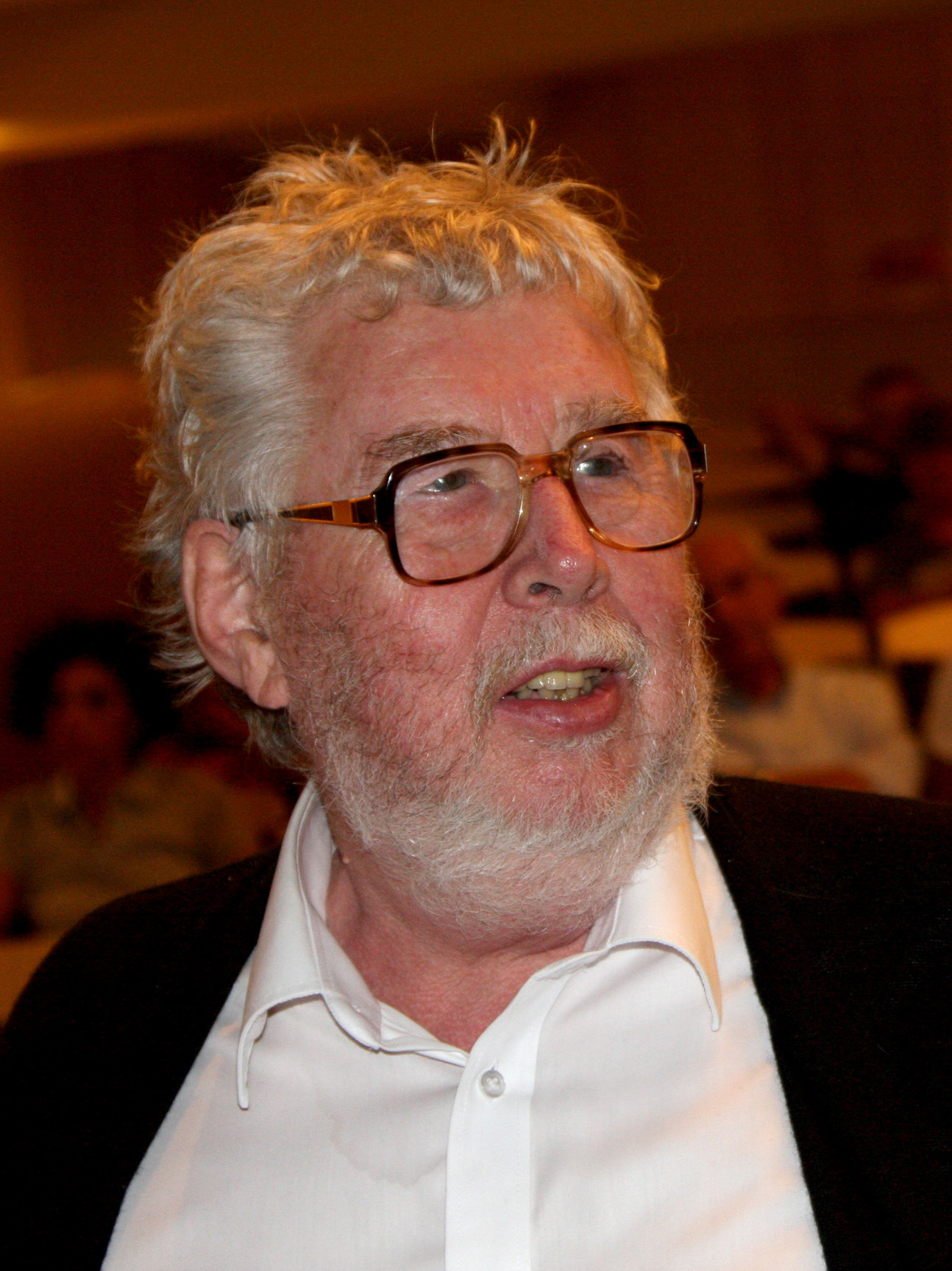
- The composer in 2008
- Librettist: Russell Hoban
- Language: English
- Premiere: 24 October 1994; Glyndebourne Touring Opera

The Second Mrs Kong is an opera in two acts, with music by Sir Harrison Birtwistle to a libretto by Russell Hoban. Glyndebourne Touring Opera first staged the opera on 24 October 1994. The cast included Philip Langridge, Helen Field and Michael Chance. Tom Cairns designed and directed the production, in collaboration with choreographer Aletta Collins. Elgar Howarth was the conductor. This production was recorded for the National Video Archive of Performance by the V&A Theatre Museum. This recording is available to view by appointment at the V&A Collections Centre and Reading Room in Olympia, London.

The opera is a mix of ancient and modern mythologies as well as history. Jonathan Cross has commented that the work, "like so many of Birtwistle's operas....is concerned with mythology" and is more about "the idea of Kong" rather than King Kong as such. He has also analysed parallels between this work and Birtwistle's earlier opera The Mask of Orpheus. Robert Adlington has critically discussed the relationship of the opera's music to the words. David Beard has examined in detail the relationship of various forms of images to the music and Birtwistle's and Hoban's collaboration.

The second production of the opera took place in 1996 in Vienna. The London premiere of the work was in November 2004, as part of the 70th birthday concerts for Birtwistle.

== Roles ==
Role	Voice type	Premiere Cast, 24 October 1994 (Conductor: Elgar Howarth)
Kong, the idea of him	tenor	Philip Langridge
Pearl, Vermeer's Girl with a Pearl Earring	soprano	Helen Field
Orpheus, forever singing his loss/Head of Orpheus	counter-tenor	Michael Chance
Anubis, a jackal-headed boatman/Death of Kong, a wrong assumption	bass-baritone	Steven Page
Vermeer, left behind by Pearl	baritone	Omar Ebrahim
Inanna (Mrs Dollarama), dead former beauty queen	mezzo-soprano	Phylis Cannan
Mr Dollarama, dead film producer	baritone	Robert Poulton
Mirror/Mirror Echo, the voice of reflection	soprano	Deborah York
Swami Zumzum, Inanna's dead spiritual advisor	tenor	Kevin West
Madame Lena, the customary sphinx	alto	Nuala Willis
Woman Model/Terror, temptation	soprano	Jacquelyn Parker
Woman Model/Despair, temptation	mezzo-soprano	Elizabeth Gronow
Woman Model/Fear, temptation	mezzo-soprano	Clarissa Meek
Woman Model/Doubt, temptation	soprano	Louise Armit
Eurydice, forever lost to Orpheus	soprano	Liza Pulman
Joe Shady/Monstrous Messenger	bass	Henry Waddington
Chorus of the Dead, populating the world of shadows

== Synopsis ==
=== Act 1 ===
The setting is the World of Shadows, a realm of the dead where historical people and fictional characters can intermingle. Anubis transports the dead to the World of Shadows. The dead are permitted to relive selected moments from their past. One such moment is when Vermeer paints Pearl as the subject of his painting Girl with a Pearl Earring. Pearl first learns of the existence of the mythical giant ape King Kong after she hears his voice through the mirror that is in the room where Vermeer is painting. Kong himself is metaphysically trying to determine his identity while in denial of his own death. When he becomes aware of Pearl through the mirror, he becomes infatuated with her.

Later in the Act, Pearl is residing in a "stockbroker's high-tech penthouse", and at one point sees an excerpt from the 1933 film of King Kong on television. Pearl decides to try to establish a connection with Kong. Kong determines to leave the World of Shadows to find Pearl in the World of the Living, with the help of Orpheus.

=== Act 2 ===
Orpheus joins Kong in his quest as they leave the World of Shadows. Four female temptations assault them, and one severs Orpheus' head. At the entrance to the World of the Living, Kong and the Head of Orpheus ("all that remains") encounter the Sphinx, who challenges Kong. Kong passes the trial. Kong manages to contact Pearl by telephone, but Death of Kong, Kong's nemesis, attacks Kong; Kong prevails in the fight. Kong and Pearl then try to meet and declare their love. However, they ultimately cannot touch each other.
