= Kristiene Clarke =

British documentary director & producer

- Occupations: Director, producer and academic
- Years active: 1988–present

Kristiene Clarke is a British documentary director, producer and academic. She is the first transgender filmmaker in the world to have created documentaries addressing the topic. She has had extensive education and training in various forms of filming and production, and over 70 flagship films to her name since she began directing and producing in 1988. Her work contains themes of cultural, political and sexual diversity and documents the lives and adversity of a variety of people from contrasting backgrounds. Throughout her work she strives to challenge stereotypes and ensure individuals' sexuality and trans identity are not withheld from them. She believes that analysing how the LGBTQ community is represented via media platforms such as books, TV and film can provide an insight into the contemporary values held within society. Clarke states that there is a popular assumption that transgender individuals are part of a homogeneous group with identical values, and through her filmmaking she aims to unhinge this notion.

== Career ==
Clarke's career began in 1988 when she directed Sex Change: Shock! Horror! Probe! was aired on Channel 4. Primarily her films are designed to be aired on TV. Many of these have been shown on UK TV channels such as Channel 4, ITV (TV channel), Channel 5 (UK) as well as overseas platforms. Clarke also created work for the award-winning series Arena (TV series) that featured on BBC.

The Truth about Gay Sex (2001) directed by Clarke was screened at the 26th Frameline Film Festival, a San Francisco lesbian and gay film festival in 2002. The 49 minute film shot in Manchester's Gay Village, Canal Street (Manchester), intends to highlight how straight individuals lack knowledge of gay sex and strives to educate its audience with detailed advice and explanations. Tokyo International Lesbian & Gay Film Festival screened Clarke's 1994 documentary Pointing Percy in 1999.

Clarke worked as the event co-ordinater at the Aldeburgh Documentary Film Festival in 2011, which featured the most compelling and thought-provoking documentaries circulating the media at that time. During the festival Clarke's documentary Shantytown Shakespeare (2006) was screened and she conducted a masterclass for students.

=== Sex Change: Shock! Horror! Probe! (1988) ===
The film explores stigma surrounding transgender individuals as well as documenting their struggle to be considered 'normal' people. The films delves into the cultural and political difficulties of transgender issues within society. It does this by questioning how gender was perceived at the time, as well as showing the process of being transgender after having surgery. The narrative stemmed from Clarke's anger towards the press' interest to know details surrounding Adèle Anderson's sexuality. Clarke says she decided on this title for the documentary in order to "...ridicule the tabloid headlines at the time.".

Other trans people featured in the film besides Anderson include Stephanie Booth, Mark Rees, Rachael Webb, and Christine Goodwin who went on to take the British Government to the European Court of Human Rights in Goodwin vs United Kingdom.

Clarke said that in the process of making the film and working with the cast that she felt encouraged to reflect upon her own transgender experience and the hardship she faced.

In an interview with Autostraddle in 2025, Clarke talked about the struggle she had to get the film made:

"I wasn't prepared for the backlash I got. This was in 1984. And basically I came up against the separatist feminist, biological determinist lobby, one of whom was a commissioning editor who had all kinds of objections. It took two or three years to get it made from that point onward, going through various appeal processes inside Channel 4. Then they came up with the idea that they didn't want me to direct it, but I could produce it. They wanted to give me a director who would give it some kind of objectivity — someone who was another separatist feminist, biological determinist. I wanted to get the film made so I agreed to it. But my first act as producer was to say to the director: Stay at home, I'll give you the money, but you're not directing this film. I'll give you the credit and pay you your full salary, but you don't come on set. That was it."

In 2023, the film received renewed attention when TgirlsOnFilm - a transfeminist curatorial project run by Jaye Hudson - screened the film at the Prince Charles Cinema with an interview with Clarke. TGirlsonFilm has since taken the film to queer film festivals such as SQIFF in Glasgow and TITE in Dublin.

=== Sandra Bernhard: Confessions of a Pretty Lady (1994) ===
This is a mid-length film documenting comedian, Sandra Bernhard which explores various topics such as her sexuality and shows footage of her shoots for Playboy. Clarke showcases the entertainer by giving the audience the chance to "see the real woman behind the fabulous image". In the film Bernhard, her mother, Jeanette, and her aunt and uncle are interviewed. The film was originally made to be aired on the BBC for the documentary series Arena (TV series) however it was taken from the line-up that year.

=== Academia ===
Clarke holds an academic position at the University of Kent teaching 'moving image production', in addition to this she is a mentor at Warnborough College. Clarke has also been a guest lecturer at many other academic institutions such as University of Manchester, University of London, Queen Mary University of London, Royal Holloway, University of London, and London School of Economics. Furthermore, Clarke also delivers masterclasses in cultural institutions worldwide.

== Personal life ==
As of 2015, she resides in London, England with her dog, Harry, and cat, Burt.

== Filmography ==
Year	Title	Credit Listing
2011	Verdict on a Virus (Documentary)	Director, Producer
2010	Give Stigma the Index Finger (Documentary)	Director, Producer
2010	Criminalize Hate not HIV (Documentary Short)	Director
2008	Pom Poms for Peace (Documentary short)	Director, Producer
2007	Beauty and the Beasties (Documentary short)	Director
2006	Shantytown Shakespeare (Documentary)	Director, Producer
2003	Naked City (TV Series Documentary)	Director, Producer
2003	Changing the Scene: Santos Dumont (Documentary Short)	Director
2002	The Truth of Masturbation (TV Movie Series)	Director
2001	The Truth about Gay Sex (TV Documentary Series)	Director
1999	Sweet Talk (TV Series)	Director
1999	Sixties Summer Songs (TV Series Short)	Director, Producer
1997	Village Voices (Documentary)	Director
1995	Homo Economics (Documentary)	Director
1995	Jibby Beane: The Art Scene Queen (Documentary	Director
1995	Doing Rude Things (Documentary)	Director
1994	Sandra Bernhard: Confessions of a Pretty Lady (Documentary)	Director
1994	Pointing Percy (Documentary Short)	Director
1992	Armistead Maupin is a Man I Dreamt Up (TV Movie Documentary)	Producer
1991	Moveable Feast (Documentary)	Director, Producer
1990	Smashing Pigs (TV Documentary Short)	Director
1988	Sex Change: Shock! Horror! Probe! (Documentary)	Director, Producer

== Awards and nominations ==
Kristiene Clarke has received awards for her directing and producing from various International Film Festivals.
