= Alan Maryon-Davis =

British doctor (born 1943)

Alan Maryon-Davis (born January 1943) is a British doctor turned public health specialist. He is the Honorary Professor of Public Health at King's College London, chair of the Public Health Advisory Committee of NICE of the UK Department of Health (2013–?), president of the Faculty of Public Health (2007–2010), and the inaugural chair of the Royal Society for Public Health (2008–?).

== Early life ==
He was born in Chiswick, West London, and was educated at St Paul's School, London, St John's College, Cambridge, and St Thomas's Hospital Medical School, King's College London.

== Public health career ==
Following an early career in hospital medicine and general practice, he transferred to the field of public health with a focus on health promotion and prevention. He was Head of Health Sciences at the Health Education Council (a national non-government organization based in London) and a member of various UK Department of Health committees and task forces on nutrition, physical activity, cancer prevention, accident prevention, and health partnerships. In the mid-1980s he co-founded the National Forum for Coronary Heart Disease Prevention (which became the National Heart Forum and then the UK Health Forum) and, in collaboration with the Welsh Office, the Welsh heart disease prevention programme Heart Beat Wales.

In 1988, he switched to working at the local level as a public health specialist in inner south London, most recently as Director of Public Health for Southwark Primary Care Trust (2002–07). a role he combined with a part-time senior lectureship in public health at King's College London, contributing to the undergraduate and postgraduate teaching programmes. On retirement from the NHS in 2007 he was granted an honorary professorship in public health at King's.

As well as his local role, Maryon-Davis has continued to play a part at a national level. He was elected Chair of the Royal Institute of Public Health in 2006 and instigated its merger with the Royal Society for the Promotion of Health to form the Royal Society for Public Health in 2008, becoming the new organisation's inaugural chair. He was also elected as president of the Faculty of Public Health (2007–10) and focused on championing and expanding the Faculty’s policy and advocacy function with a particular emphasis on childhood obesity, mental health, and the health consequences of climate change. Maryon-Davis currently chairs the Public Health Advisory Committee for the National Institute for Health and Care Excellence developing a series of guidelines on effective interventions for tackling such issues as oral health, indoor air quality, and mental well-being at work (2013- ).

His charity roles, running in parallel with the above, have included: trustee of Medicine, putting cinemas in hospitals around the UK (1998–2018); chair of the parents' and babies' charity Best Beginnings (2011–16); chair of Alcohol Research UK (2014–18), overseeing its merger with Alcohol Concern to form the new charity Alcohol Change, becoming its first chair (2018–19); and chair of Medact, which campaigns for health, social and climate justice (2019- ). He also chairs Nadder Community Energy, a community benefit society promoting renewable energy generation and use in Wiltshire (2020- ).

Maryon-Davis was awarded an MBE in the New Year Honours 2021 for services to Public Health.

== Media career ==
Alan Maryon-Davis has also been a prolific writer and broadcaster on health matters in a parallel career spanning over 40 years. His broadcasting began as a regular guest doctor on the London independent radio station LBC in the mid-1970s. He then became the BBC Radio 1 'Doc' in a regular slot called Stayin' Alive with DJ David ('Kid') Jensen. In the 1980s he presented a number of series on health for BBC Radio 4 and was a co-presenter, with doctors Graeme Garden and Gillian Rice, of BBC1's popular medical series Bodymatters. Most recently he has made numerous appearances on national radio and TV commenting on the COVID-19 pandemic.

His journalism has included a wide range of outlets. He wrote a weekly 'Dear Dr. Alan' Q&A column in Woman magazine for 17 years and has written ten books on various health subjects for the general reader. He was formerly editor-in-chief of the quarterly magazine Public Health Today and vice-chair of the Medical Journalists' Association (2010–11).

== Musical career ==
His third career has been as a member of the comedy singing group Instant Sunshine since its foundation in 1966.

== Selected list of works ==
- Coltart C, Maryon-Davis A, Epidemiology and Public Health. Chapter in Medicine for MRCP (Bessant R, ed), Oxford, OUP, 2020.
- Maryon-Davis A, Working with the media. Chapter in the Oxford Handbook of Public Health Practice, Fourth Edition (Kawachi I et al, ed), Oxford, OUP, 2020.
- Maryon-Davis A, Government legislation and the restriction of personal freedoms. Chapter in: Beyond Behaviour Change: Key Issues, Interdisciplinary Approaches and Future Directions (Spottswood F, ed), Bristol, University of Bristol, 2016.
- Maryon-Davis A, Press V; Easing the Pressure: tackling hypertension - A toolkit for developing a local strategy to tackle high blood pressure; London, Faculty of Public Health and National Heart Forum; 2005.
- Maryon-Davis A, Weight management in primary care: how can it be made more effective?, Proc Nutr Soc., 2005 Feb;64(1):97-103.
- Maryon-Davis A, Sarch L, Morris M, Laventure R; Let’s Get Moving - A Physical Activity Handbook for Developing Local Programmes; London, Nat Heart Forum & Faculty of Public Health, 2001.
- Maryon-Davis A, Non-cardiovascular benefits of exercise. Chapter in Marathon Medicine 2000 (Tunstall-Pedoe D, ed.), London, RSM Press, 2001.
- Maryon-Davis A, Blake Q, Feeling Good! Easy Steps to Staying Healthy, Age Concern Books, 2007
- Maryon-Davis A, Body Facts, Macdonald, 1984
- Maryon-Davis Dr. A, Family Health & Fitness, Octopus Books, 1981

== Sources ==
- Faculty of Public Health
- King's College London page
