= Philip Langridge =

British opera singer (1939-2010)

Philip Langridge CBE
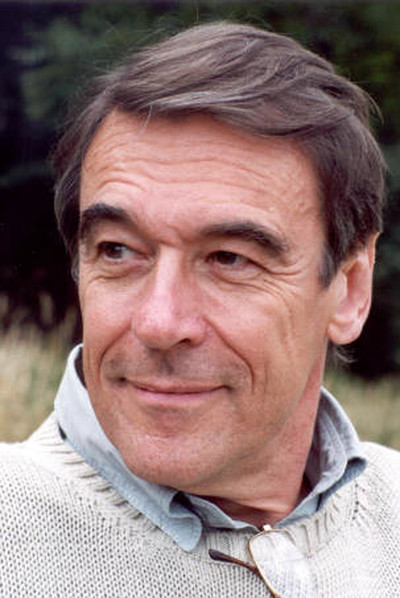
- Born: Philip Gordon Langridge; 16 December 1939; Hawkhurst, Kent, England
- Died: 5 March 2010 (aged 70); Guildford, Surrey, England
- Education: Maidstone Grammar School, Royal Academy of Music
- Occupation: Opera singer (tenor)
- Spouse: Ann Murray

Philip Gordon Langridge CBE (16 December 1939 – 5 March 2010) was an English tenor, considered to be among the foremost exponents of English opera and oratorio.

== Early life ==
Langridge was born in Hawkhurst, Kent, educated at Maidstone Grammar School and studied at the Royal Academy of Music in London. He started his career as an orchestral violinist, which exposed him to a great variety of music.

== Career ==
Langridge was admired for his fine singing technique coupled with keen dramatic instincts. His repertoire was broad, ranging from the operas of Claudio Monteverdi and Mozart to more modern works by Ravel, Stravinsky, Janáček and Schoenberg. At the end of his life, he was adding some Wagner roles, including Loge from Das Rheingold. Langridge was also a fine concert singer and regularly performed the sacred music of Bach and Handel. He also won great acclaim for his portrayal of the title role in Elgar's The Dream of Gerontius. In later years, Langridge frightened and delighted families with his portrayal of the witch in Hansel and Gretel at the Metropolitan Opera holiday production.

For all his versatility, he was at his most distinguished performing the works of Benjamin Britten. Britten composed much of his vocal music specifically for his artistic and life partner, tenor Sir Peter Pears. Many regarded Langridge as Pears' true successor because they shared similar vocal qualities and brought uncommon immediacy to the music they performed. He recorded many of his famous roles, including Peter Grimes and the Prologue / Quint in The Turn of the Screw, as well as all the orchestral song cycles for tenor voice.

Langridge's association with Harrison Birtwistle began in 1986 when he created the role of Orpheus in his opera The Mask of Orpheus. He also sang The Lawyer in the world premiere recording of Punch and Judy (1989) and created the roles of Kong in The Second Mrs Kong (Glyndebourne, 1994) and Hiereus in The Minotaur (Royal Opera House, 2008). Birtwistle composed Vanitas (based on a poem by David Harsent) especially for Langridge's 70th birthday concert at London's Wigmore Hall in November 2009.

In 1976 he created the title role in Thomas Wilson's adaptation of James Hogg's 1823 novel The Private Memoirs and Confessions of a Justified Sinner with Scottish Opera.

Langridge was made Commander of the Order of the British Empire (CBE) for his services to music in the 1994 Birthday Honours.

== Private life ==
He was married to Irish mezzo-soprano Ann Murray until his death from bowel cancer.

== See also ==
- Mozart: Le nozze di Figaro (Georg Solti recording)

== Sources ==
- BBC News, "British tenor Philip Langridge dies at 70", 7 March 2010
- Christiansen, Rupert, "I still lie awake at night. The fear never goes away", The Daily Telegraph, 12 January 2006.
- Clements, Andrew, "Review: Philip Langridge, Wigmore Hall, London", The Guardian, 6 November 2009
- Daily Telegraph, "Philip Langridge", 7 March 2010
- Hewett, Ivan, "The Minotaur: father and son venture into the labyrinth", The Daily Telegraph, 10 April 2008
- Kozinn, Allan "Philip Langridge, British Operatic Tenor, Dies at 70", The New York Times, 8 March 2010
- Millington, Barry, "Philip Langridge Obituary: Leading British tenor committed to the theatrical dimension of the operatic stage" The Guardian, 7 March 2010
- The Times, "Philip Langridge: operatic tenor", 8 March 2010
- Valencia, Mark "Philip Langridge CBE, 1939–2010", What's on Stage, 6 March 2010
