= Nick Lera =

British film maker of steam railway documentaries

Nick Lera (born 1941) is a documentary film maker who created a library of over twenty international documentaries recording the closing years of the age of steam railways in the decades before and after the Millennium. Formerly available on DVD most are now available on the YouTube channel Great Railways, where they have achieved total views of over 1.5 million. His early career was as a film cameraman, spending six years with British Movietone News, followed by 29 years with BBC TV News. He won the News Cameraman of the Year award twice, in 1969 and 1970.

== Early career ==
Lera joined British Movietone News in 1961 as a camera assistant and later full cameraman filming cinema newsreels, such as the Grand National and Cowes Regatta.

== BBC Cameraman ==
In 1967 Lera secured a one-year contract with BBC TV News. Towards the end of the contract a London production company offered him a month in Mexico as part of their team covering the Olympic Games. His footage of the track events in the main stadium formed part of the last cinema film made of the Olympics, ending the tradition started by Leni Riefenstahl in 1936 in Berlin.

On his return from Mexico, Lera joined the BBC staff full time, remaining with them for 28 years. He filmed in the Middle East and Vietnam (1972–73), the 1974 revolution in Portugal, and the US evacuation from Saigon (1975).

In 1979 he was attached to BBC Documentaries as director/cameraman to film presenter Miles Kington on a trip across the Andes in 1980 from Lima, Peru to Viacha, Bolivia on the Central of Peru railway, then the world's highest railway. The film, ‘Three Miles High’ was the sixth in the series, and achieved a record audience of 10 million. Kington later described Lera as an 'ace cameraman' in his column in The Independent. Lera also filmed 'Zambezi Express', the fifth in the first series, presented by Michael Wood and travelling from Cape Town to Victoria Falls. Both films were broadcast in December 1980.

== Railway documentaries ==
In his spare time, Lera had begun filming railways all over the world and, on leaving the BBC in 1996, started doing this full time. His ‘World Steam Classics’ film series comprises some twenty documentaries, many of which are available on YouTube:

Argentina - Patagonia Express, 1991

Austria - Winter Steam on Two Gauges, 2004

Burma to the River Kwai, 1999

China - Steam to the Gobi Desert, 1992

Eritrea - Rebirth of a Railway, 2003

India - Toy Train to the Clouds, Darjeeling, India, 1999

Kenya - Steam to Mombasa, 1993

New Zealand Steam Cavalcade - North Island, 2000

New Zealand Steam Cavalcade - South Island, First Chapter, 2001

New Zealand Steam Cavalcade - South Island, Second Chapter, 2001

Pakistan - Rails to the North-West Frontier, 1997

Poland - Last Stronghold of Steam in Europe, 1989

Rails to the Arabian Desert, Jordan and Syria, 1994

Saxony - When the Wall Came Down, 1991/93

Scotland - Steam's Revival in Scotland, 1 The Roads to the Isles

South Africa - Garratt Country, 2010

Spain - RENFE Steam - Past and Present, 1999

Steam's Indian Summer, India, 1997

Wheels of Fire - Indonesia, 1974/1991

Woodburners of Paraguay, 1991

== Independent reviews of the documentaries ==
Several of Lera's video documentaries have been independently reviewed.

About 'Burma to the River Kwai' the reviewer notes:

"One of the strengths of Nick Lera's videos is the research he puts in which places them in their historical context. In this case, the background to the need for the railway is well covered together with what proved to be the flaws in its conception ... Where Nick's videos really score are in their unexpected little extras... and there are some delightful sequences of ordinary life."

The same reviewer says of 'Eritrea - Rebirth of a Railway':

"Starting with a short section which puts the railway and its rebuilding in its historical perspective, we see the final stages of reconstruction, visit the workshops and meet the staff who are even older than their vintage steam locomotives. ... We ride the train from Asmara to Massawa and back and take a trip on a Littorina. Both the scenery and the action in it are absolutely stunning. ... To my mind this is an exemplar ..."

On 'Toy Train to the Clouds' the reviewer says:

"This video ... examines various aspects of the line's history, its operations, its architecture, the people who work on it and the problems Indian Railways face in maintaining this veritable relic of the Raj. ... The film outlines the close relationship between the railway, its people and its environment. ... Toy Train captures the Darjeeling Himalayan Railway at a unique moment, in transition from a working steam railway to a part of the international heritage industry.

An account of the filming of Steam's Indian Summer was published by Sir Mark Tully. Tully starts the article by saying: "When I set out with Nick Lera, a remarkable cameraman-director and an authority on railways, to make a film called Steam's Indian Summer, we could not be sure where steam engines still ran." Tully goes on to write about their adventures travelling around India to search out steam trains that were still in operation.

== Film shows ==
Lera has given numerous film shows at various venues including the British Film Institute at the National Film Theatre in London. In October 1999 he gave a film show at the Royal Society for Asian Affairs in London about railways at the border of British India, and was subsequently invited by the then Chairman of Council, Sir Donald Hawley, to contribute an article based on the talk to the Society's Journal Asian Affairs, which was published in 2000.
