= Jack Pulman =

British television screenwriter (1925–1979)

- Born: 11 July 1925; London, England
- Died: 20 May 1979 (aged 53); London, England
- Occupations: Screenwriter, television writer
- Spouse: Barbara Young (m. 1956)
- Children: Liza Pulman; Cory Pulman

Jack Pulman (11 July 1925 – 20 May 1979) was a British television screenwriter, most famous for the 1976 BBC television series, I, Claudius, based on the novels I, Claudius and Claudius the God by Robert Graves.

== Biography ==
Born and raised in London, Pulman was renowned as "adaptor-extraordinary," having written teleplays for such literary works as, The Portrait of a Lady, Jane Eyre, Crime and Punishment, David Copperfield, and War and Peace.

Pulman married Barbara Young in 1956. Together they had two children, including actress and singer Liza Pulman.

He died of a heart attack in London on 20 May 1979. His last screenplay, Private Schulz, went into production after his death. His widow, Barbara Young, collected a posthumous writers award from The Royal Television Society for his work on the show in 1982.

He also wrote the screenplays for the 1970 film The Executioner and the 1971 film adaptation of Robert Louis Stevenson's Kidnapped.
