= Miles Kington =

British journalist and musician

- Born: Miles Beresford Kington; 13 May 1941; Downpatrick, County Down, Ireland
- Died: 30 January 2008 (aged 66); Limpley Stoke, Wiltshire, England
- Education: Bilton Grange
- Alma mater: Glenalmond College
- Occupations: Journalist, presenter, jazz musician
- Spouses: Sarah Paine (m. 1964; div. 1987) Hilary Caroline Maynard (m. 1987; died 2008)

Miles Beresford Kington (13 May 1941 – 30 January 2008) was a British journalist, musician (a double bass player for Instant Sunshine and other groups) and broadcaster. He is also credited with the popularisation of Franglais through humorous skits which mixed French and English.

== Early life ==
Kington was born to William Beresford Nairn (also "Nairne", depending on the source) Kington (1909–1982), of Frondeg Hall, Rhostyllen, Denbighshire, Wales, and his first wife Jean Ann (1912–1973; daughter of John Ernest Sanders, of Whitegates, Gresford, Denbighshire) in Downpatrick, County Down, Northern Ireland, where his father, a captain in the Royal Welch Fusiliers, was then posted. Subsequently, Bill Kington ran the Border Brewery in Wrexham, North Wales. The Kingtons were a branch of a landed gentry family that married into the Scottish Clan Oliphant and produced the line of Kington-Blair-Oliphant Chieftains of Gask. Kington had a younger brother, Stewart (1943–2009), who followed his father in the brewing trade, later becoming a cameraman.

Kington was educated at Bilton Grange, a prep school in Rugby, then Trinity College, Glenalmond, a boys' fee-funded boarding school (now Glenalmond College). During a gap year Kington worked as a translator in New York City, and lived in Greenwich Village. He then studied Modern Languages (French and German) at Trinity College, Oxford. After graduation he spent some time writing with Terry Jones, an Oxford contemporary; but the teaming did not click, and Jones was in reality waiting for his friend Michael Palin to graduate.

== Career ==
Inspired particularly by the American humourist S. J. Perelman, Kington began his writing career at the satirical magazine Punch, where he spent some 15 years. It was during this time, in the late 1970s, that he began writing his Franglais columns, written in a comical mixture of English and French. These short sketches purported to be a study course taking as their raison d'être that "les Français ne parlent pas le O-level français" ("the French do not speak O-level French"). They were later published as a series of books (Let's Parler Franglais!, Let's Parler Franglais Again, Let's Parler Franglais One More Temps, and so on) and in 1984 made into a short TV series. During the 1980s he presented Steam Days, an informative programme about Britain's railways. He also presented one episode, "Three Miles High", in the first series of the BBC's Great Railway Journeys, travelling through parts of Peru and Bolivia filmed by Nick Lera, whom he later described as an 'ace cameraman'.

Taught the piano from the age of seven, Kington discovered when he fell in love with jazz during adolescence that being able to read music meant he felt unable to improvise; he therefore took up the trombone. At Oxford he found that several fellow undergraduates played better, so he switched to the double bass when someone pointed out the shortage of bass players at the university. Kington was for many years a member of the cabaret quartet Instant Sunshine. To his regret, he only played in a jazz group for a brief period in 1962 during a summer job in Spain, where he ran into the British politician Enoch Powell, apparently looking somewhat displeased. Meeting Powell years later at a Punch meal and reminding him of their previous meeting, he was amused by Powell's comment: "I never forgot a face". Kington moved away from London in the 1980s, remarried, and worked from his home in the village of Limpley Stoke, near Bath.

He wrote a humorous column for The Independent, which he joined in 1987 after six years at The Times. He also wrote a similar column for The Oldie.

He also satirised Bertrand Russell in "Bertrand's Mind Wins over Mater", in Welcome to Kington: Includes All the Pieces You Cut Out From The Independent and Lost (1989). In addition, Kington wrote two stage plays. Waiting for Stoppard, a good-natured pastiche of early Tom Stoppard plays and simultaneously a convoluted farce involving the fatwa against Salman Rushdie, was seen at the Bristol New Vic, Southwark Playhouse and other venues in 1995. The following year came The Death of Tchaikovsky – a Sherlock Holmes Mystery, in which Kington appeared in person at the Edinburgh Festival.

== Death and legacy ==
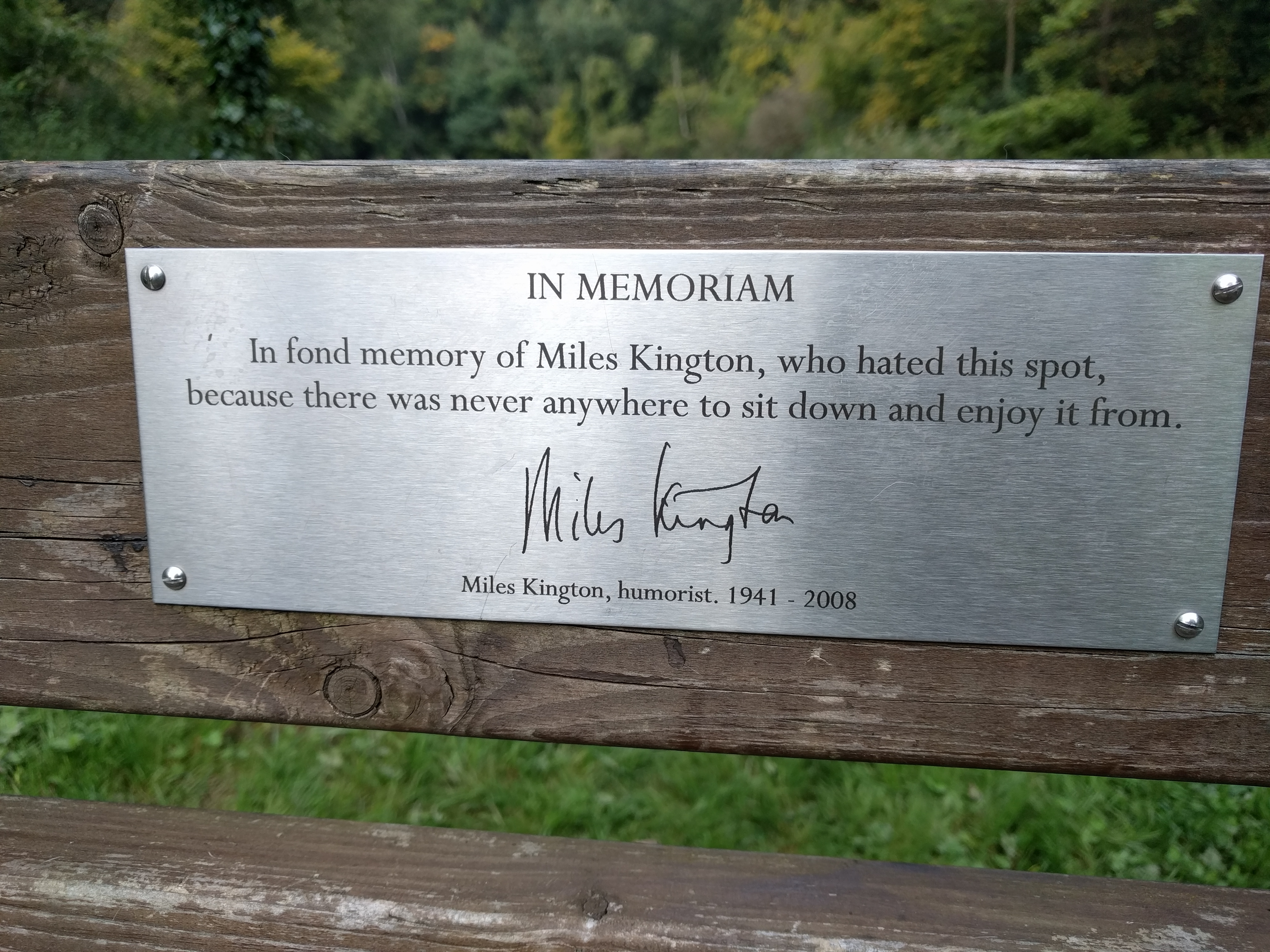
Plaque on Kington's memorial bench

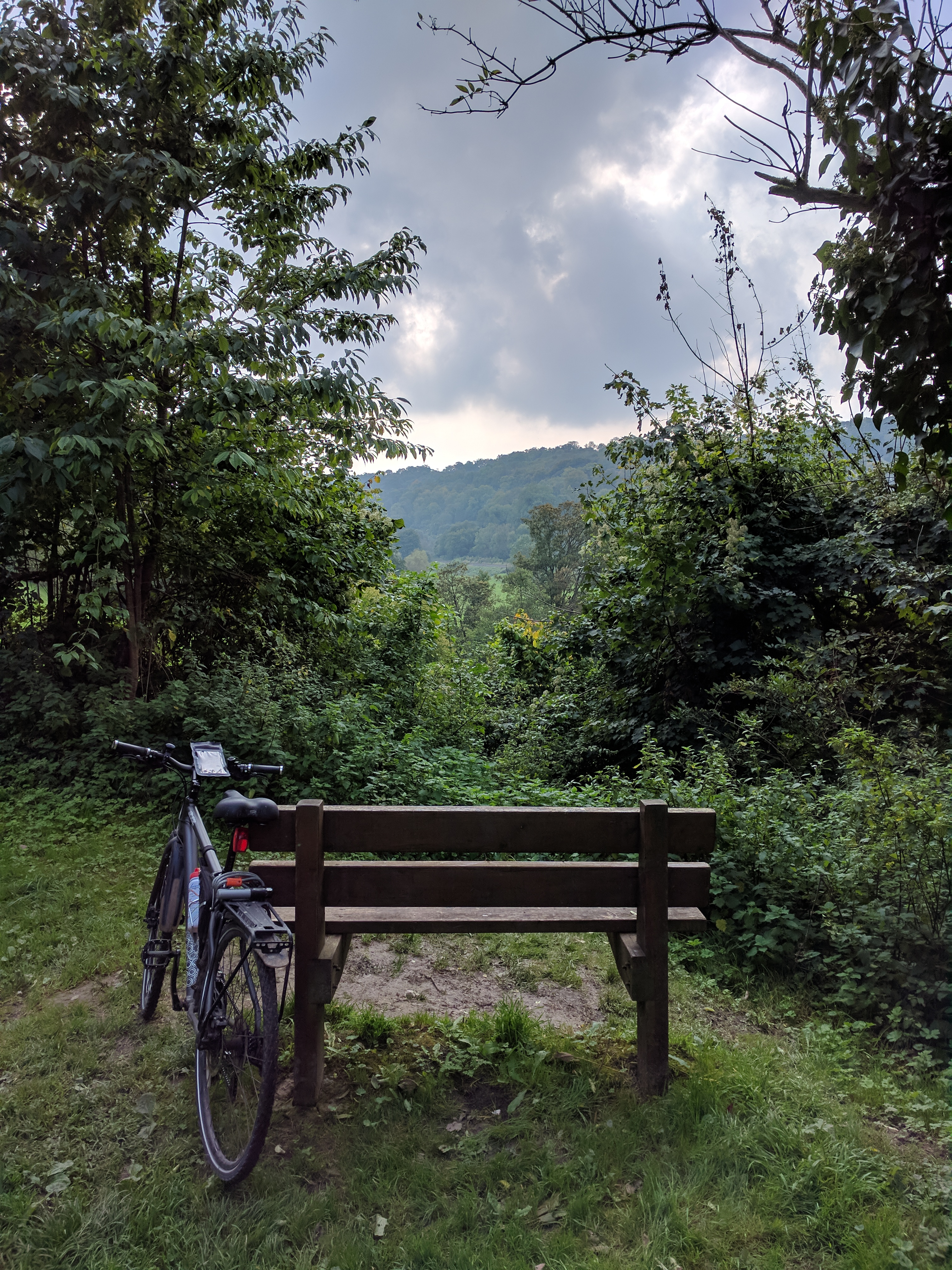
Kington's memorial bench

Kington died at his home in Limpley Stoke, near Bath, after a short illness, having just filed what became his final copy for The Independent. He had suffered from pancreatic cancer. In October 2008, "How Shall I tell the Dog?", written by him about events after receiving his terminal diagnosis, was serialised by BBC Radio Four, featuring Michael Palin as Kington.

A quotation frequently attributed to him is: "Knowledge is knowing that a tomato is a fruit. Wisdom is not putting it in a fruit salad."

He is commemorated by a memorial bench alongside the Kennet and Avon Canal, near Blackberry Lane, Conkwell. It bears a plaque, with the inscription:

In Memoriam

In fond memory of Miles Kington, who hated this spot, because there was never anywhere to sit down and enjoy it from. Miles Kington, humorist. 1941–2008

== Bibliography ==
=== Franglais books ===
- Let's parler Franglais! London: Robson, 1979, ISBN 0-86051-081-6.
- Let's parler Franglais again! London: Robson, 1980, ISBN 0-86051-114-6.
- Parlez vous Franglais? London: Robson, 1981, ISBN 0-86051-150-2.
- Let's parler Franglais one more temps. London: Robson Books, 1982, ISBN 0-86051-178-2.
- The Franglais lieutenant's woman. London: Robson, 1986, ISBN 0-86051-398-X.

=== Other books ===
- Miles and Miles. London: Hamilton, 1982, ISBN 0-241-10901-9 .
- Moreover. London: Robson, 1982, ISBN 0-86051-173-1.
- A Wolf In Frog's Clothing. Methuen, 1983, ISBN 0-413-52680-1.
- Nature made ridiculously simple, or, How to identify absolutely everything. London: Hamilton, 1983, ISBN 0-241-11116-1.
- Moreover, Too. Harmondsworth: Penguin, 1985, ISBN 0-14-008540-8.
- Welcome to Kington. London: Robson, 1989, ISBN 0-86051-616-4.
- Steaming Through Britain. London: Unwin Hyman, 1990, ISBN 0-04-440488-3.
- Jazz: An Anthology. London: HarperCollins, 1992, ISBN 0-00-215199-5.
- Motorway Madness. London: HarperCollins, 1998, ISBN 0-00-255912-9.
- Someone Like Me: Tales From A Borrowed Childhood. London: Headline, 2005, ISBN 0-7553-1356-9 (autobiography).
- How Shall I Tell the Dog?: Last Laughs from the Master. London: Profile Books, 2008, ISBN 1-84668-197-9.
- The World of Alphonse Allais (translation of humorous essays by Alphonse Allais. London: Faber & Faber, 2008, ISBN 978-0-571-24738-7
- My Mother, the Bearded Lady: the Selected Letters of Miles Kington. London: Unbound, 2018.

=== Stage plays ===
- Waiting For Stoppard. ~1995.
- Death Of Tchaikovsky – A Sherlock Holmes Mystery. ~1996.
