= Instant Sunshine =

Comedy musical cabaret group

- Origin: London, England
- Genre: Comedy
- Years active: 1966–present
- Label: EMI
- Members: David Barlow; Tom Barlow; Peter Christie; Alan Maryon-Davis
- Past members: Miles Kington

Instant Sunshine is a comedy musical cabaret group who sing to an acoustic guitar accompaniment. It was formed in 1966 by three doctors at St Thomas' Hospital in London, Peter Christie, David Barlow and Alan Maryon-Davis. In 1972 they were joined by the journalist and double bass player Miles Kington. In 1998 Kington left the group and Tom Barlow joined in his place for several years.

== Work ==
Peter Christie is the leading spirit and writes the words and music. The group's style has been compared to Flanders and Swann, with "Monty Pythonesque Absurdity". The lyrics typically have an element of surreal fantasy (one song begins "Our Budgie has Changed to an Orang-Utang"), while the tunes are usually wistful and mock-sentimental. Their act contains an abundance of comic asides and sound effects, usually provided by Alan Maryon-Davis. They perform at music festivals or in cabaret at private bookings, and have played alternate years at the Edinburgh Fringe since 1975. The group have also performed many songs for radio and television programmes, being particularly known for their regular contribution to BBC Radio 4's Stop The Week over a period of about ten years. They provided the theme song for the BBC television version of Stephen Potter's One-Upmanship (1979), had three series of their own on Radio 4 (1985, 1986 and 1988), and published a book, The Instant Sunshine Book – with hints for struggling supergroups (Robson Books 1980). In 1980 the BBC made the film Roads to Stardom, which followed the group during performances during the year; The film was broadcast on BBC2 on Christmas Eve. The same year, the group presented a story on children's series Jackanory.

They produced five vinyl LPs: Live at Tiddy Dols (Page One 1968), Instant Sunshine (EMI 1976), Funny Name for a Band (EMI 1977) Reasonably Together Again (EMI/One-Up 1979) and The Instant Sunshine LP – Songs for struggling supergroups (EMI/NTS 1980). There are currently seven CDs in print, Instant Sunshine Comes of Age (Merlin Classics 1987), Jubilee (Merlin Classics 1992), Live at the Old Vic (Merlin Classics 2002), 50 Not Out (Instant Sunshine 2017) and remixed versions of the EMI recordings Instant Sunshine, Funny Name for a Band and Reasonably Together Again (all Instant Sunshine 2008). The recordings are currently occasionally broadcast on BBC Radio 4 Extra and are available via the BBC iPlayer.

== Song titles ==
=== Instant Sunshine (1976) ===
1. "Worms"
2. "No News Today"
3. "When I was in Bombay"
4. "Metamorphosis" ("Our budgie has changed to an Orang-Utang")
5. "Ten-gallon Hat"
6. "Corduroy Trousers"
7. "Spanish Holiday"
8. "Top Dogs"
9. "I Wish I Was a Sassenach"
10. "Some Dancing"
11. "Don't Tell the Abbot"
12. "The Monster"
13. "Habeas Corpse"
14. "Herts is Trumps" ("Tring")
15. "Mrs Brown"
16. "Doctors"
17. "Fleeting Time"

=== Funny Name for a Band (1977) ===
1. "Sunshine"
2. "Nouveau Poor"
3. "The Blues"
4. "Kiddies' Olympics"
5. "Bar-stool Sailing"
6. "Flooding"
7. "Methylated"
8. "The Canary Song" ("When you're working down a mine")
9. "Bird Seed"
10. "Hurdey Gurdey"
11. "Now I'm Adolescent"
12. "Here We Go Again"
13. "Poor Guy"
14. "Tittle-tattle Rag"
15. "Talking Plants"
16. "Who Mowed the Lawns of Eden"
17. "The Demon in the Drink" ("Salvation Army")
18. "Sunshine" (reprise)

=== Reasonably Together Again (1979) ===
1. "Heathrow Holiday"
2. "A Very Tropical Subject"
3. "Tadpoles"
4. "On the Fringe"
5. "Kids on the Corner"
6. "My Lawn"
7. "Danish Bacon Baby"
8. "Boring Song"
9. "A Little Bit of Burgling on the Side"
10. "Ruthless Roues"
11. "Beefcake"
12. "Rabbikang"
13. "Lily Gilding"
14. "Allotment"
15. "Don't Eat a Turkey this Christmas"
16. "Our Show is Live"

=== Instant Sunshine Comes of Age (1987) ===
1. "The Parish Magazine"
2. "A Memorable Meal"
3. "Smooth Train Blues"
4. "Yodelling Neurosis"
5. "My Garden Shed"
6. "My Dog Has Fleas"
7. "Every Body needs a Body"
8. "Wish You Were Here"
9. "Spring Collection"
10. "Has Anyone Seen My Horse"
11. "At the Launderette"
12. "Scat Like That"
13. "Foreign Relations"
14. "Conservation Conversation"
15. "Who Mowed the Lawns of Eden?"
16. "Never be Tempted by Water"
17. "Go Plastic"
18. "Platform Three"
19. "Sorry"
20. "Los Peckham Ryos"

=== Jubilee (1992) ===
1. "A Bouquet of Roes"
2. "Whitehall Farce"
3. "What is a Thingummy-jig"
4. "Middlesex Man"
5. "Pick up the Phone"
6. "Eating Food is Wrong"
7. "Specs Appeal"
8. "If I Keep on Whistling"
9. "Shiny Leather Chair"
10. "Who Dunnit"
11. "Ideal Home"
12. "Cucumber Sandwiches"
13. "Birds and Bees"
14. "Holiday Survival"
15. "Westminster Pier to Greenwich"
16. "It Happened in the Park"
17. "Equal Animal Rights"
18. "Alas Poor Hamlet"
19. "Mini Mozart"
20. "Listen to the Summer"
21. "Fleeting Time"

=== Live at the Old Vic (2002) ===
1. "Sunshine"
2. "Birdseed"
3. "Platform Three"
4. "Knitting for Victory"
5. "Herts is Trumps"
6. "Smooth Train Blues"
7. "The Euro"
8. "The Demon in the Drink"
9. "Our Show is Live"
10. "Lots in the Attic"
11. "Lugubrious Lobster"
12. "Who Mowed the Lawns of Eden"
13. "My Horse and I" ("Has Anyone Seen my Horse?")
14. "Corduroy Trousers"
15. "Kiddies Olympics"
16. "Conservation Conversation"

=== 50 Not Out (2017) ===
1. "Knitting for Victory"
2. "Dear Diary"
3. "My Caddy Said"
4. "Toy Sympathy"
5. "Very Tiny Brain"
6. "Weather is Never Quite Right"
7. "Awfully Keen on the Arts"
8. "I Wonder What It's Like To Be a Star"
9. "Old Times Back"
10. "Peace of Mind"
11. "Squidger"
12. "Aunt Agatha's Hat"
13. "Man From Pollock"
14. "Christmas Greetings"
15. "Lots In The Attic"
16. "Incurable Romantic"
17. "Gondoliers"

=== Others including ===
- "Rambling Man"
- "Lords Pavilion"
- "Flibbertygibbet Flo"
- "My Lavatory Lady"
- "Fish and Chips"
- "Look After Yourself"
- "Money Box"

== Literature ==
- Barlow, David (et al.), The Instant Sunshine Book with Hints for Struggling Supergroups (Robson Books, 1980) ISBN 0-86051-119-7: includes music and lyrics for songs from the Instant Sunshine LP
