= Adèle Anderson =

British actor

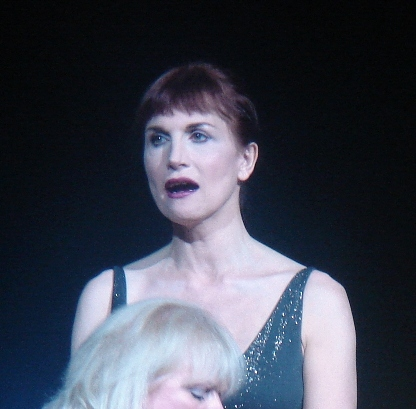
- Anderson performing with Fascinating Aïda in 2008.
- Born: 14 June 1952 (age 74); Southampton, Hampshire, England
- Awards: Nominated for Drama Desk Award with Fascinating Aïda; Nominated for Perrier Award with Fascinating Aïda
- Website: fascinatingaida.co.uk

Adèle Anderson (born 14 June 1952) is an English singer and actress, and one third of the cabaret group Fascinating Aïda. In 1995, with Fascinating Aïda, she was nominated for the Laurence Olivier Award for Best Entertainment.

== Career ==
Anderson has appeared internationally in concerts, in theatrical plays, and on the BBC Television programme Gemma Masters. In addition, sometimes with Dillie Keane, Anderson writes lyrics to most of Fascinating Aïda's songs and has contributed to the songs of several hit musicals, including The Challenge (Shaw Theatre) and The Ten Commandments (The Place).

=== Fascinating Aïda ===
Anderson joined Fascinating Aïda in 1984, a year after its inception, and has performed with them ever since. In 2014, they recorded the show Charm Offensive, which they toured nationwide.

== Credits ==
=== Theatre ===
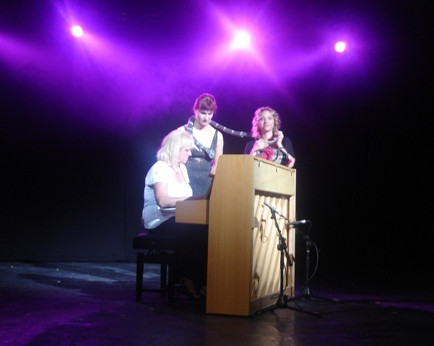
Fascinating Aïda performing in 2008.

- The Best Little Whorehouse in Texas (Landor Theatre)
- Follies (Landor Theatre)
- Into the Woods (Derby Playhouse and The Forum, Wythenshawe)
- Achilles in Heels (Landor Theatre)
- When Florence Met Isadora (Rosemary Branch)
- Eminent Victorians and The Art of Love (Battersea Barge)
- Let's Kick Arts (The Bridewell)
- Ken Hill's Phantom of the Opera (National Tour)
- Die Fledermaus (European Chamber Opera Tour)
- Wasp (Edinburgh Festival Fringe), Salad Days (National Tour)
- Plan 9 from Outer Space – The Musical (National Tour)
- Sunset Boulevard (Sydmonton Festival)
- Nine (Royal Festival Hall)
- House of Obsession (Half Moon)
- Girls who wear glasses (National Tour)
- Tales my Lover Told Me (King's Head).
- Elegies for Angels, Punks and Raging Queens (Rebel Theatre)
- She has appeared in five pantomimes around the country and directed two at The Theatre, Chipping Norton. She also directed Kaye's the Word, Paul Hull's tribute to Danny Kaye, which played the Edinburgh Festival Fringe and the New End Theatre. She and Warren Wills have performed jazz/cabaret together at Pizza on the Park and the Langham Hilton and also played the Hong Kong Fringe Festival.
- Closer to Heaven (Above the Stag Theatre).
- Priscilla, Queen of the Desert (UK and Ireland Tour).

=== Writing ===
- Fascinating Aïda lyrics
- Co-writer of Dillie Keane's three solo shows: Single Again, Citizen Keane and Back With You.
- Song "The English Lesson" (with Dillie Keane) for The Shakespeare Revue (Vaudeville Theatre and World Tour).
- As a member of the Mercury Workshop she wrote (with Sarah Travis) a section of the collaborative musical The Challenge (Shaw Theatre).
- Ninth Commandment for the Mercury Workshop's production of The Ten Commandments (The Place) (with Warren Wills).
- Debut solo album: Why Try to Change Me Now?, original songs by herself (with Sarah Travis)

=== Film, television & radio ===
- Lady Jane (directed by Trevor Nunn)
- Company Business, in which she serenaded Gene Hackman and Mikhail Baryshnikov.
- Dr Tockley in Hotel Babylon (BBC1)
- Gemma Masters in Fish (BBC1)
- Cecily Watkins in New Tricks (BBC1)
- The Whingeing Pom (LWT)
- Plutopia (Radio 4)
- Anderson was also a consultant (and made a cameo appearance) for the film Different for Girls, starring Steven Mackintosh and Miriam Margolyes.
- Candace in The Romanoffs (Amazon Video)
- Sex Change: Shock! Horror! Probe! (Channel 4) in which she appeared as herself, and sang in the film.

== Personal life ==
Anderson is a transgender woman. She had gender affirming surgery after graduating from Birmingham University, as part of her medical transition. She completed her social transition some time before speaking publicly about being transgender. It is alleged that Anderson was outed by News of the World. Anderson featured in Kristiene Clarke's Sex Change: Shock! Horror! Probe! (1988) which was made in response to the transphobia she received.

Her career history includes working as a civil servant and a secretary, before later becoming a jazz singer.

She is a patron of Humanists UK (formerly known as the British Humanist Association). She later became a humanist celebrant for Humanists UK, specialising in non-religious weddings.

On 15 September 2010, Anderson, along with 54 other public figures, signed an open letter published in The Guardian, stating their opposition to Pope Benedict XVI's state visit to the UK.

== See also ==
- Liza Pulman
