= Dillie Keane =

English actress and singer (born 1952)

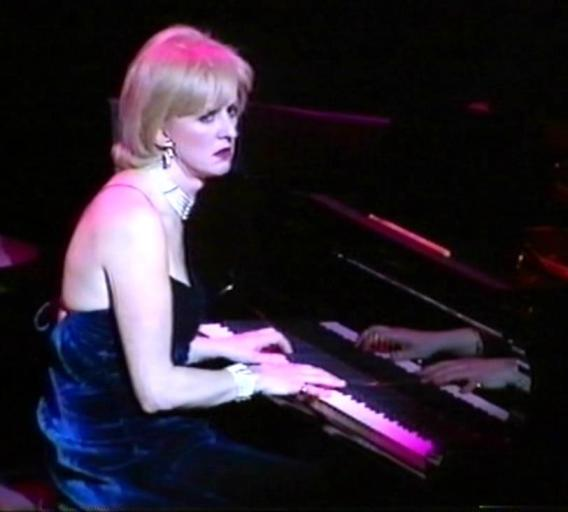
- Keane performing with Fascinating Aïda, 2000
- Born: Louise Miriam Keane; 23 May 1952 (age 73); Portsmouth, England
- Education: Trinity College Dublin; London Academy of Music and Dramatic Art (BA)
- Years active: 1984–present
- Awards: Perrier Award nominations (1984, 1990)
- Website: fascinatingaida.co.uk

Louise Miriam "Dillie" Keane (born 23 May 1952) is an actress, singer and comedian. She has been a member of the comedy cabaret trio Fascinating Aïda since its 1983 inception, and has also pursued a solo career. In 1995, with Fascinating Aïda, she was nominated for the Laurence Olivier Award for Best Entertainment.

== Early life ==
Born in Portsmouth in 1952, Keane is the daughter of Frank Keane, a doctor from County Mayo, and Miriam Slattery, originally from Tralee, County Kerry, and was brought up in Portsmouth as a Roman Catholic. "My mother was a dragon," Keane said in 2008.

Keane was educated at the strict Roman Catholic Woldingham School (or Sacred Heart), where she sang in the school choir and played the guitar on the Folk Mass album recorded by some of the girls at Abbey Road Studios in 1967. She has described the school as disorganised. At the age of eighteen, she was expelled for going to see Fellini's Satyricon in London with boys from Worth School.

Keane then crammed for A-levels and studied music at Trinity College, Dublin, but left the four-year course after three years and went on to study acting for three years at the London Academy of Music and Dramatic Art.

== Career ==
=== Theatre and Fascinating Aïda ===
Keane was nominated for a Perrier Award at the Edinburgh Festival in 1990 for her one-woman theatre show Single Again (Sean Hughes would go on to win the award), returning the following year with Citizen Keane. In 1995, with Fascinating Aïda, she was nominated for the Laurence Olivier Award for Best Entertainment. Between 1999 and 2001 she toured a one-woman show, Back With You, taking in the UK and Germany, and winning the Best Comedy Award at the Moers Comedy Festival in 2001.

In 2002, Keane wrote the songs for Sandi Toksvig's musical comedy Big Night Out at the Little Palace Theatre (starring in the show itself at the Watford Palace Theatre with Toksvig and Bonnie Langford). Other works include the plays A Slice of Life (1981) and Boat People (1983). She has written songs for two pantomimes with Adèle Anderson.

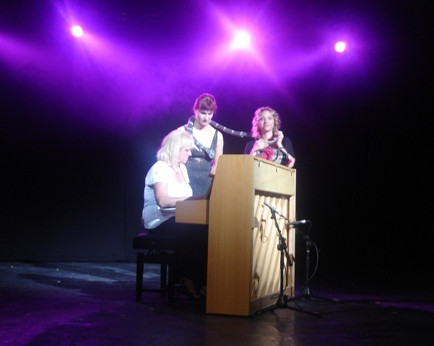
Fascinating Aïda performing in 2008

Keane continued her acting career, including touring versions of Dancing at Lughnasa and Charley's Aunt, Juno and the Paycock at the Leicester Haymarket; The Plough and the Stars at the West Yorkshire Playhouse in Leeds; Accommodating Eva at the King's Head Theatre in Islington and Present Laughter at Birmingham Repertory Theatre. She was included in the premiere production of The Vagina Monologues in Dublin in 2002. She appeared with Kit and The Widow in Tomfoolery in 2005 and in the premiere one night only staging of a new musical version of Little Women at the Theatre Royal, Drury Lane.

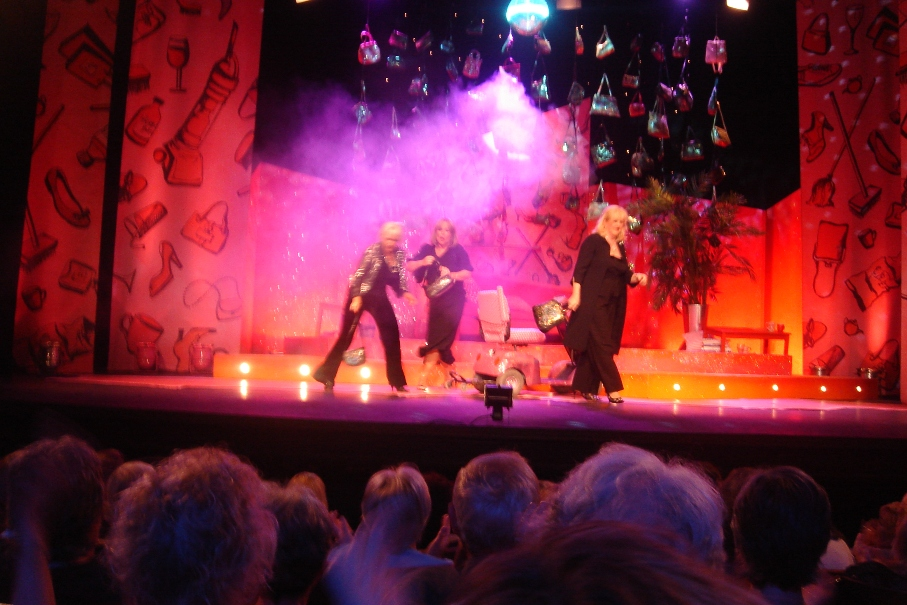
Keane with Jenny Eclair and Linda Robson in the final performance of Grumpy Old Women Live

In 2006, Keane appeared with Jenny Eclair and Linda Robson, in Grumpy Old Women Live, and as the Duchess in Me and My Girl (2006) on a new national tour. She performed the role of Dolly in Frank and Dolly a new play by Lizzie Hopley at the Edinburgh Festival 2007, for which she was nominated for the Stage Best Actress Award, before getting back on tour with Grumpy Old Women Live. She then toured round Ireland performing the role of Lady Bracknell in The Importance of Being Earnest, before returning to England, and beginning to write new songs for the 25th anniversary of Fascinating Aïda, which performed for a few weeks at the Jermyn Street Theatre.

On 29 June 2008, she appeared in (and produced with Barb Jungr) The Lovely Russell Concert, which celebrated the life of her friend and colleague Russell Churney. In 2009, she toured England with Fascinating Aïda, and completed a new album.

=== Television ===
As well as appearing in documentaries about Fascinating Aïda, Keane has appeared with Richard Griffiths and Samantha Janus in Pie in the Sky, and with Phil Cool on a number of his series.

=== Radio ===
Keane has written and presented on radio for shows such as Stop the Week, 4th Column, Booked! and Call Me When You're in Something (which won the Prix Monte Carlo).

=== Writing ===
Keane was a columnist for the Mail on Sunday (1993–95), and published two books connected with Fascinating Aïda: The Joy of Sequins—The Fascinating Aïda Songbook (1995) and Fascinating Who? (1985).

== Personal life ==
Keane was in a relationship with John O'Neill for over 22 years until his death from a stroke on 13 August 2022. She lives in Oxfordshire. She travels for her work, and particularly enjoys working in Ireland, the homeland of her parents.

In 2003, she was interviewed about driving a Ford Transit: "I'm colossally uninterested in cars... but vans are different. They're incredible fun to drive. You are practically always the bigger dog. People always back up in small country lanes to let you pass. And even lorry drivers are much nicer; they'll flash you to let you in."

In the local elections of 2017, she stood as a candidate for the Liberal Democrats in the Ploughley division of Oxfordshire County Council. She came fourth, and was not elected.

== Honours ==
In 2009, Keane was made an honorary Doctor of Letters by the University of Portsmouth, in recognition of her musical career and her links with the city.
