= Asolo Repertory Theatre production history =

The Asolo Repertory Theatre is located in Sarasota, Florida. It was originally a summers-only operation called The Asolo Comedy Festival. In 1963 it began to be referred to as The Asolo Theatre Festival. Starting in the fall of 1966, when it went into year-round operation, the name was changed to The Asolo Theater Company (and it continued under that name for the next 30 years, when its title reverted to The Asolo Theater Festival). Starting in 2006, it became The Asolo Repertory Theater, familiarly known as The Asolo Rep.

== 1960 ==
=== Asolo Comedy Festival Productions ===
- The Ridiculous Ladies (Les Précieuses Ridicules) by Molière
- The Doubles (I Due Simili), commedia dell'arte scenario
- The Rivals by Richard Brinsley Sheridan
- The Servant of Two Masters by Carlo Goldoni
- The Beggar's Opera by John Gay
- The Man of Mode by George Etherege

== 1961 ==
=== Asolo Comedy Festival Productions ===
- The Country Wife by William Wycherley
- The World in the Moon
- Commedia Dell'Arte
- She Stoops to Conquer by Oliver Goldsmith
- Tartuffe by Molière
- The Secret Marriage

== 1962 ==
=== Asolo Comedy Festival Productions ===
- The Way of the World by William Congreve
- Commedia Dell'Arte
- The Barber of Seville
- The Misanthrope by Molière
- La Serva Padrona by Giovanni Battista Pergolesi
- The Music Master

== 1963 ==
=== Asolo Theatre Festival Productions ===
- The Taming of the Shrew by William Shakespeare
- The Mistress of the Inn by Carlo Goldoni
- The Rivals by Richard Brinsley Sheridan
- The School for Wives by Molière
- Cyrano De Bergerac by Edmond Rostand

== 1964 ==
=== Asolo Theatre Festival Productions ===
- Twelfth Night or What You Will by William Shakespeare
- The Imaginary Invalid by Molière
- The Lady's Not For Burning by Christopher Fry
- The School for Scandal by Richard Brinsley Sheridan

== 1965 ==
=== Asolo Theatre Festival Productions ===
- Hamlet by William Shakespeare
- The Importance of Being Earnest by Oscar Wilde
- Volpone by Ben Jonson
- Tiger at the Gates by Jean Giraudoux; translated into English by Christopher Fry

== 1966 ==
=== Asolo Theatre Festival Productions ===
- Much Ado About Nothing by William Shakespeare
- The Miser by Molière
- A Man For All Seasons by Robert Bolt
- Oedipus the King by Sophocles
- The Bald Soprano by Eugène Ionesco

== 1966-1967 ==
=== Asolo Theater Company Productions ===
- As You Like It by William Shakespeare
- Major Barbara by George Bernard Shaw
- The Fan
- The Cherry Orchard by Anton Chekhov
- The Madwoman of Challiot
- The Farce of Scalin
- Eleonora Duse
- Romeo and Juliet by William Shakespeare

=== Asolo Theater Company Tours ===
- As You Like It by William Shakespeare
- Major Barbara by George Bernard Shaw

== 1967–1968 ==
=== Asolo Theater Company Productions ===
- Henry the Fourth, Part One by William Shakespeare
- The Servant of Two Masters by Carlo Goldoni
- Tartuffe by Molière
- J.B. by Archibald MacLeish
- Look Back in Anger by John Osborne
- Antigone by Jean Anouilh
- A Midsummer Night's Dream by William Shakespeare
- The Alchemist by Fred Gaines based on Ben Jonson's play
- The Visit by Friedrich Dürrenmatt
- Wilde! by Fred Gaines
- The Caretaker by Harold Pinter

=== Asolo Theater Company ProductionsAsolo Theater Company Tours ===
- Henry the Fourth, Part One by William Shakespeare
- The Servant of Two Masters by Carlo Goldoni
- Asolo Theater Company Productions
- Arms and the Man by George Bernard Shaw
- The Misanthrope by Molière
- Oh, What a Lovely War! by Joan Littlewood
- The Lion in Winter by James Goldman
- The Homecoming by Harold Pinter
- Two Gentlemen of Verona by William Shakespeare
- You Can't Take It With You by George S. Kaufman and Moss Hart
- The Lark by Jean Anouilh
- The Hostage by Brendan Behan
- Uncle Vanya by Anton Chekhov
- The Silver Thread

=== Asolo Rep Tours ===
- Arms and the Man by George Bernard Shaw
- The Misanthrope by Molière

== 1969–1970 ==
=== Asolo Rep Productions ===
- Blithe Spirit by Noël Coward
- The Glass Menagerie by Tennessee Williams
- Misalliance by George Bernard Shaw
- The Physicists by Friedrich Dürrenmatt
- Oh Dad, Poor Dad, Mamma's Hung You in the Closet and I'm Feelin' So Sad by Arthur Kopit
- Doctor Faustus by Christopher Marlowe
- A Flea in Her Ear by Georges Feydeau
- Life with Father by Lindsay and Crouse, based on the book by Clarence Day
- All's Well That Ends Well by William Shakespeare
- The Prince
- The Tortoise and the Hare

=== Asolo Rep Tours ===
- The Glass Menagerie by Tennessee Williams

== 1970–1971 ==
=== Asolo Rep Productions ===
- Born Yesterday by Garson Kanin
- Candida by George Bernard Shaw
- A Day in the Death of Joe Egg by Peter Nichols
- The Comedy of Errors by William Shakespeare
- Love for Love
- The Subject Was Roses by Frank D. Gilroy
- Charley's Aunt by Brandon Thomas
- Our Town by Thornton Wilder
- Indians by Arthur Kopit
- The Puppet Prince
- The Snow Queen

=== Asolo Rep Tours ===
- Candida by George Bernard Shaw
- Androcles and the Lion by George Bernard Shaw
- Hansel and Gretel

== 1971–1972 ==
=== Asolo Rep Productions ===
- The Front Page by Ben Hecht and Charles MacArthur
- Twelfth Night or What You Will by William Shakespeare
- The Best Man by Gore Vidal
- Hay Fever by Noël Coward
- Dracula by Hamilton Deane
- The House of Blue Leaves by John Guare
- The Matchmaker by Thornton Wilder
- The Devil's Disciple by George Bernard Shaw
- War and Peace by Eb Thomas
- The Time of Your Life by William Saroyan
- The Legend of Sleepy Hollow
- The King Stag by Carlo Gozzi, translated by Eb Thomas

=== Asolo Rep Tours ===
- Twelfth Night or What You Will by William Shakespeare
- Cinderella
- Just So Stories by Rudyard Kipling

== 1972–1973 ==
=== Asolo Rep Productions ===
- Pygmalion by George Bernard Shaw
- Angel Street by Patrick Hamilton
- The Philadelphia Story by Philip Barry
- The Crucible by Arthur Miller
- Hotel Paradiso by Georges Feydeau and Maurice Desavallieres
- The Effect of Gamma Rays on Man-in-the-Moon Marigolds by Paul Zindel
- Little Mary Sunshine by Rick Besoyan
- The Rose Tattoo by Tennessee Williams
- The Merchant of Venice by William Shakespeare
- Big Klaus and Little Klaus
- Aladdin
- The Canterville Ghost adapted from the story by Oscar Wilde
- The Wind in the Willows

=== Asolo Rep Tours ===
- Angel Street by Patrick Hamilton
- Jack and the Beanstalk
- Two Pails of Water
- Aladdin

== 1973–1974 ==
=== Asolo Rep Productions ===
- Trelawny of the Wells by Arthur Wing Pinero
- Private Lives by Noël Coward
- The Devil's General
- Broadway by George Abbott and Philip Dunning
- A Delicate Balance by Edward Albee
- Arsenic and Old Lace by Joseph Kesselring
- Inherit the Wind by Jerome Lawrence and Robert Edwin Lee
- Ring Round the Moon by Christopher Fry
- The Tragedy of Macbeth by William Shakespeare
- Don Quixote of La Mancha
- Story Theatre

=== Asolo Rep Tours ===
- Private Lives by Noël Coward
- The Brave Little Tailor
- Reynard the Fox

== 1974–1975 ==
=== Asolo Rep Productions ===
- There's One in Every Marriage by Georges Feydeau
- The Mistress of the Inn by Carlo Goldoni
- The Plough and the Stars by Seán O'Casey
- Tobacco Road by Jack Kirkland
- Heartbreak House by George Bernard Shaw
- The Sea by Edward Bond
- Guys and Dolls -music and lyrics by Frank Loesser; book by Jo Swerling and Abe Burrows
- Tartuffe by Molière
- King Lear by William Shakespeare
- The Patriots by Sidney Kingsley
- Trolls and Bridges

=== Asolo Rep Tours ===
- The Mistress of the Inn by Carlo Goldoni
- Rumpelstiltskin
- Heracles

== 1975–1976 ==
=== Asolo Rep Productions ===
- The New York Idea by Langdon Elwyn Mitchell
- Hogan's Goat by William Alfred
- Going Ape
- Boy Meets Girl by Samuel and Bella Spewack
- A Streetcar Named Desire by Tennessee Williams
- The Quibbletown Recruits
- The Music Man by Meredith Willson
- Look Homeward, Angel by Ketti Frings
- Win With Wheeler
- 1776 – music and lyrics by Sherman Edwards; book by Peter Stone
- And All That Jazz

=== Second stage ===
- Knock Knock by Jules Feiffer
- The Sea Horse
- Oh, Coward!
- Serenading Louie by Lanford Wilson
- Two for the Seesaw by William Gibson

=== Asolo Rep Tours ===
- The Patriots by Sidney Kingsley
- Hansel and Gretel
- Peck's Bad Boy
- Something with Jamie in the Title
- Antigone by Sophocles

== 1976–1977 ==
=== Asolo Rep Productions ===
- The Ruling Class by Peter Barnes
- Mummer's End
- Cat on a Hot Tin Roof by Tennessee Williams
- The Waltz of the Toreadors by Jean Anouilh
- Desire Under the Elms by Eugene O'Neill
- My Love to Your Wife
- Cyrano de Bergerac by Edmond Rostand
- Saturday, Sunday, Monday
- Cromwell by Victor Hugo

=== Second stage ===
- Scapino!
- A Christmas Carol
- The Importance of Being Earnest by Oscar Wilde
- The Good Doctor by Neil Simon

=== Asolo Rep Tours ===
- Queen Bird and the Golden Fish
- Step on a Crack
- Hey There – Hello
- The Doctor in Spite of Himself by Molière

== 1977–1978 ==
=== Asolo Rep Productions ===
- The Royal Family by George S. Kaufman and Edna Ferber
- Juno and the Paycock by Seán O'Casey
- She Stoops to Conquer by Oliver Goldsmith
- The School for Wives by Molière
- Travesties by Tom Stoppard
- Richard III by William Shakespeare
- The Man Who Came to Dinner by George S. Kaufman and Moss Hart
- The Inspector General by Nikolai Gogol
- Catsplay

=== Asolo Rep Tours ===
- Vasilia
- The Bald Soprano by Eugène Ionesco
- Wiley and the Hairy Man by Jack Stokes

=== FSU/Asolo Conservatory Productions ===
- Archy and Friends
- In this Golden Land
- Whatever Became of Love
- Aria Da Capia

== 1978–1979 ==
=== Asolo Rep Productions ===
- Design for Living by Noël Coward
- The Shadow Box by Michael Cristofer
- Volpone by Ben Jonson
- Let's Get a Divorce
- Long Day's Journey into Night by Eugene O'Neill
- A History of American Film
- Othello by William Shakespeare
- Stag at Bay
- The Cherry Orchard by Anton Chekhov

=== Asolo Rep Tours ===
- Plain Folk
- Press Cuttings
- Raduz and the Three Clouds

=== FSU/Asolo Conservatory Productions ===
- Merlin!
- Good Doctor by Neil Simon

== 1979–1980 ==
=== Asolo Rep Productions ===
- Ah, Wilderness! by Eugene O'Neill
- The Tempest by William Shakespeare
- Da by Hugh Leonard
- Tintypes conceived by Mary Kyte with Mel Marvin and Gary Pearle
- Man and Superman by George Bernard Shaw
- Idiot's Delight by Robert E. Sherwood
- The Warrens of Virginia
- Transcendental Love
- Stand-Off At Beaver and Pine

=== Asolo Rep Tours ===
- Beauty and the Beast
- The Tingalary Bird
- The Tragedy of Macbeth by William Shakespeare
- The Marriage Proposal by Anton Chekhov

== 1980–1981 ==
=== Asolo Rep Productions ===
- On Golden Pond by Ernest Thompson
- The Beggar's Opera by John Gay
- Terra Nova
- The Song is Kern
- The Three Musketeers
- Picnic by William Inge
- Once in a Lifetime by Moss Hart and George S. Kaufman

=== Asolo Rep Tours ===
- Aladdin
- Rashomon
- The Men's Cottage

== 1981–1982 ==
=== Asolo Rep Productions ===
- A Midsummer Night's Dream by William Shakespeare
- Mrs. Warren's Profession by George Bernard Shaw
- The Show-Off
- The All Night Strut
- Charley's Aunt by Brandon Thomas
- The Male Animal by James Thurber and Elliott Nugent
- The Girl of the Golden West by David Belasco

=== Asolo Rep Tours ===
- The Song is Kern
- Pinocchio
- The Ice Wolf
- Comedies of Courtship

== 1982–1983 ==
=== Asolo Rep Productions ===
- The Dining Room by A. R. Gurney
- A View from the Bridge by Arthur Miller
- Misalliance by George Bernard Shaw
- Man with a Load of Mischief by Ashley Dukes
- Sherlock Holmes
- The Winslow Boy by Terence Rattigan
- Dark of the Moon by Howard Richardson

=== Asolo Rep Tours ===
- Angel Street by Patrick Hamilton
- Peter and the Hungry Wolf
- Hercules and Friends
- Canterbury Tales

== 1983–1984 ==
=== Asolo Rep Productions ===
- Arms and the Man by George Bernard Shaw
- Waiting for Godot by Samuel Beckett
- The Gin Game by D.L. Coburn
- Promenade, All!
- Death of a Salesman by Arthur Miller
- The Drunkard by William H. Smith
- Rashomon
- The Importance of Being Earnest by Oscar Wilde

=== Asolo Rep Tours ===
- Promenade, All!
- The Nightingale
- Step on a Crack
- Prince Hamlet

=== FSU/Asolo Conservatory Productions ===
- Hooters
- The Lady From Dubuque by Edward Albee
- 1984 One-Person Shows

== 1984–1985 ==
=== Asolo Rep Productions ===
- Children of a Lesser God by Mark Medoff
- Amadeus by Peter Shaffer
- And a Nightingale Sang by C.P. Taylor
- The Little Foxes by Lillian Hellman
- Dames at Sea – book and lyrics by George Haimsohn and Robin Miller; music by Jim Wise.
- A Month in the Country by Ivan Turgenev
- You Can't Take It with You by George S. Kaufman and Moss Hart
- Twice Around the Park by Murray Schisgal

=== Asolo Rep Tours ===
- Children of a Lesser God by Mark Medoff
- Androcles and the Lion
- Wiley and the Hairy Man by Jack Stokes
- The Doctor in Spite of Himself by Molière

=== FSU/Asolo Conservatory Productions ===
- Men Without Dates
- Chocolate Cake
- Final Placement
- FM

== 1985–1986 ==
=== Asolo Rep Productions ===
- A Christmas Carol: Scrooge and Marley
- Greater Tuna by Jaston Williams, Joe Sears, and Ed Howard
- A Moon for the Misbegotten by Eugene O'Neill
- Sleuth by Anthony Shaffer
- Hamlet by William Shakespeare
- As Is by William M. Hoffman
- Forgive Me, Evelyn Bunns
- Tartuffe by Molière
- How the Other Half Lives
- The Foreigner by Larry Shue

=== Second stage ===
- A Life in the Theatre by David Mamet
- Orphans by Lyle Kessler
- Spoon River Anthology by Edgar Lee Masters

=== Asolo Rep Tours ===
- A Moon for the Misbegotten by Eugene O'Neill
- The Frog Prince
- Mother Hicks by Suzan Zeder
- Antigone by Sophocles

=== FSU/Asolo Conservatory Productions ===
- Southern Exposures
- Laundry and Bourbon by James McLure
- Lone Star by James McLure
- Loose Ends by Michael Weller
- The Real Inspector Hound by Tom Stoppard

== 1986–1987 ==
=== Asolo Rep Productions ===
- A Christmas Carol: Scrooge and Marley
- The Rainmaker by N. Richard Nash
- Who's Afraid of Virginia Woolf? by Edward Albee
- Orphans by Lyle Kessler
- Deathtrap by Ira Levin
- Nunsense by Dan Goggin
- Our Town by Thornton Wilder
- The Perfect Party
- All My Sons by Arthur Miller

=== Asolo Rep Tours ===
- The Brave Little Tailor
- Reynard the Fox
- The New Kid
- Soldiering

=== FSU/Asolo Conservatory Productions ===
- Cloud Nine by Caryl Churchill
- Taken in Marriage
- American Buffalo by David Mamet

== 1987–1988 ==
=== Asolo Rep Productions ===
- Nunsense by Dan Goggin
- Philadelphia Here I Come! by Brian Friel
- The Heiress by Ruth Goetz and Augustus Goetz
- Of Mice and Men
- Ladies in Retirement by Reginald Denham and Edward Percy
- Pump Boys and Dinettes by John Foley, Mark Hardwick, Debra Monk, Cass Morgan, John Schimmel and Jim Wann
- I'm Not Rappaport by Herb Gardner
- Berlin to Broadway with Kurt Weill

=== Second stage ===
- First Time Anywhere!
- Mass Appeal by Bill C. Davis
- Why Can't You Be Him?

=== Asolo Rep Tours ===
- Mass Appeal by Bill C. Davis
- Rumplestiltskin
- The Arkansaw Bear
- In a Room Somewhere
- Candide

=== FSU/Asolo Conservatory Productions ===
- Early Girl
- Biloxi Blues by Neil Simon
- The Very Best Time of the Year
- As You Like It by William Shakespeare
- When You Comin' Back, Red Ryder? by Mark Medoff
- Extremities by William Mastrosimone
- Starting Here, Starting Now – lyrics by Richard Maltby Jr.; music by David Shire
- Cappriccio Cabaret
- Danny and the Deep Blue Sea by John Patrick Shanley

=== Conservatory Shorts ===
- Buddies
- Ghost Stories
- Lone Star by James McLure

== 1988–1989 ==
=== Asolo Rep Productions ===
- Side by Side by Sondheim
- Towards Zero by Agatha Christie
- The Boys Next Door by Tom Griffin
- As You Like It by William Shakespeare
- Burn This by Lanford Wilson
- Medea by Euripides
- Frankie and Johnny in the Clair de Lune by Terrence McNally
- Eleemosynary by Lee Blessing
- Cyrano de Bergerac by Edmond Rostand

=== Second stage ===
- Driving Around the House
- Quarry

=== Asolo Rep Tours ===
- Towards Zero by Agatha Christie
- The Reluctant Dragon
- Puss 'n Boots
- The Code Breaker
- Social Life

=== FSU/Asolo Conservatory Productions ===
- Christmas on Mars
- Hedda Gabler by Henrik Ibsen
- Something Blue
- Antigone by Sophocles
- Love's Labour's Lost by William Shakespeare

== 1989–1990 ==
=== Asolo Rep in the Mertz Theatre ===
- A Walk in the Woods by Lee Blessing
- Blithe Spirit by Noël Coward
- Man and Superman by George Bernard Shaw
- Eastern Standard by Richard Greenberg
- 70, Girls, 70 – book by Fred Ebb and Norman L. Martin; adapted by Joe Masteroff; lyrics by Fred Ebb, and music by John Kander
- Talking Pictures
- Steel Magnolias by Robert Harling
- Quarry
- The Mystery of Irma Vep by Charles Ludlam

=== Asolo Rep Tours ===
- Blithe Spirit by Noël Coward
- The Jungle Book
- This is Not a Pipe Dream
- Troubled Waters
- The Code Breaker

=== FSU/Asolo Conservatory in the Cook Theatre ===
- Crown Cork Cafeteria
- The Dining Room by A. R. Gurney

== 1990–1991 ==
=== Asolo Rep in the Mertz Theatre ===
- Other People's Money by Jerry Sterner
- The Cocktail Hour by A. R. Gurney
- Driving Miss Daisy by Alfred Uhry
- A Tale of Two Cities
- Only Kidding
- The Heidi Chronicles by Wendy Wasserstein
- "Master Harold"...and the Boys by Athol Fugard
- Bedroom Farce by Alan Ayckbourn

=== FSU/Asolo Conservatory in the Cook Theatre ===
- Bus Stop by William Inge
- Sam Shepard: An American Dreamer by Sam Shepard
- Molière: Two Plays by Molière

== 1991–1992 ==
=== Asolo Rep in the Mertz Theatre ===
- My Three Angels by Samuel and Bella Spewack
- The Man of Mode by George Etherege
- Odd Jobs
- Fences by August Wilson
- Songs of Don Juan
- Svengali – book and lyrics by Gregory Boyd; music by Frank Wildhorn
- Lost Electra
- Remembrance by Derek Walcott

=== FSU/Asolo Conservatory in the Cook Theatre ===
- La Ronde by Arthur Schnitzler
- Twelfth Night or What You Will by William Shakespeare
- Born Yesterday by Garson Kanin
- The Dumb Waiter by Harold Pinter
- The Zoo Story by Edward Albee

== 1992–1993 ==
=== Asolo Rep in the Mertz Theatre ===
- Real Women Have Curves by Josefina Lopez
- The Substance of Fire by Jon Robin Baitz
- Centerburg Tales
- Sweet and Hot
- Nora
- Lips Together, Teeth Apart by Terrence McNally
- Legacies
- Love Letters by A. R. Gurney

=== FSU/Asolo Conservatory in the Cook Theatre ===
- The Homecoming by Harold Pinter
- Terra Nova
- Hot' l Baltimore by Lanford Wilson

== 1993–1994 ==
=== Asolo Rep in the Mertz Theatre ===
- King Lear by William Shakespeare
- Big Top
- From the Mississippi Delta
- Okiboji
- Das Barbecü by Jim Luigs and Scott Warrender
- Forty-Four Sycamore by Bernard Farrell
- Dancing at Lughnasa by Brian Friel

=== FSU/Asolo Conservatory in the Cook Theatre ===
- Our Country's Good by Timberlake Wertenbaker
- The Woolgatherer by William Mastrosimone
- Misalliance by George Bernard Shaw
- Tartuffe by Molière
- The Crucible by Arthur Miller

== 1994–1995 ==
=== Asolo Rep in the Mertz Theatre ===
- The 1940's Radio Hour by Walton Jones
- Talley's Folly by Lanford Wilson
- Arms and the Man by George Bernard Shaw
- The Glass Menagerie by Tennessee Williams
- The Gravity of Honey
- Bee Hive
- 13 Rue De L'Amour

=== FSU/Asolo Conservatory in the Cook Theatre ===
- Hay Fever by Noël Coward
- Extremities by William Mastrosimone
- The Gift of the Magi
- The Winter's Tale by William Shakespeare
- Brighton Beach Memoirs by Neil Simon
- Broadway Bound by Neil Simon
- Dutchman by Amiri Baraka
- Action by Sam Shepard
- Brilliant Traces by Cindy Lou Johnson

== 1995–1996 ==
=== Asolo Rep in the Mertz Theatre ===
- Jane Eyre
- The Three Musketeers
- A Stone Carver
- Noises Off by Michael Frayn
- Look Homeward, Angel by Ketti Frings
- The Taming of the Shrew by William Shakespeare
- Lady Day at Emerson's Bar and Grill
- Swingtime Canteen

=== FSU/Asolo Conservatory in the Cook Theatre ===
- From Belle to Broadway
- Working – book by Stephen Schwartz and Nina Faso; music by Schwartz, Craig Carnelia, Micki Grant, Mary Rodgers, and James Taylor; lyrics by Schwartz, Carnelia, Grant, Taylor, and Susan Birkenhead
- Gut Girls
- Bother!
- Quilters – book by Molly Newman and Barbara Damashek; lyrics and music by Barbara Damashek
- American Buffalo by David Mamet
- The Cherry Orchard by Anton Chekhov

== 1996–1997 ==
=== Asolo Rep in the Mertz Theatre ===
- The Life and Adventures of Nicholas Nickleby, Parts I and II adapted from the Charles Dickens novel by David Edgar
- The Immigrant by Mark Harelik
- Over My Dead Body by Michael Sutton and Anthony Fingleton
- Much Ado About Nothing by William Shakespeare
- Room Service by Allen Boretz and John Murray
- Beast on the Moon

=== FSU/Asolo Conservatory in the Cook Theatre ===
- Summer and Smoke by Tennessee Williams
- Arcadia by Tom Stoppard
- Translations by Brian Friel
- Steppin' Out by Richard Harris

=== Asolo Extras ===
- Once Upon a Midnight
- Laundry and Bourbon by James McLure
- Talking Head
- Saltwater Moon
- Art Is Easy!, Money Is Tough

=== Series X ===
- Words, Words, Words by David Ives
- Sure Thing by David Ives
- A Lie of the Mind by Sam Shepard

== 1997–1998 ==
=== Asolo Rep in the Mertz Theatre ===
- There's One in Every Marriage by Georges Feydeau
- Julius Caesar by William Shakespeare
- The Sisters Rosensweig by Wendy Wasserstein
- The Royal Family by George S. Kaufman and Edna Ferber
- Hobson's Choice by Harold Brighouse
- Black Coffee by Agatha Christie

=== FSU/Asolo Conservatory in the Cook Theatre ===
- Whose Life Is It Anyway? by Brian Clark
- Crimes of the Heart by Beth Henley
- The Two Gentlemen of Verona by William Shakespeare
- Noël and Cole: Men About Town

=== Series X ===
- Mistake in Identities
- The Love Talker by Deborah Pryor
- Beirut by Alan Bowne

=== Late Nite Series ===
- Tall Tales
- The Dumb Waiter by Harold Pinter
- The Briefing
- Everyman

== 1998–1999 ==
=== Asolo Rep in the Mertz Theatre ===
- Oh! What a Lovely War by Joan Littlewood
- The Last Night of Ballyhoo by Alfred Uhry
- Golden Boy by Clifford Odets
- Abe Lincoln in Illinois by Robert E. Sherwood
- The Ladies of the Camellias by Lillian Garrett-Groag
- The Rivals by Richard Brinsley Sheridan

=== Asolo Rep in the Cook Theatre ===
- Mr. Bundy
- All I Really Need to Know I Learned in Kindergarten

=== FSU/Asolo Conservatory in the Cook Theatre ===
- Shaw, Shaw and More Shaw
- Picasso at the Lapin Agile by Steve Martin
- Kindertransport by Diane Samuels
- The Matchmaker by Thornton Wilder

== 1999–2000 ==
=== Asolo Rep in the Mertz Theatre ===
- The Merry Wives of Windsor by William Shakespeare
- The Kentucky Cycle, Parts I & II by Robert Schenkkan
- Visiting Mr. Green by Jeff Baron
- The Count of Monte Cristo
- Communicating Doors by Alan Ayckbourn
- Broadway by George Abbott and Philip Dunning

=== Asolo Rep in the Cook Theatre ===
- Three Days of Rain by Richard Greenberg
- Collected Stories by Donald Margulies

=== FSU/Asolo Conservatory in the Cook Theatre ===
- Triumph of Love – book by James Magruder; lyrics by Susan Birkenhead; music by Jeffrey Stock
- Bullshot Crummond
- The Monogamist by Christopher Kyle
- The Turn of the Screw
- A View from the Bridge by Arthur Miller

== 2000–2001 ==
=== Asolo Rep in the Mertz Theatre ===
- A Christmas Carol
- I Hate Hamlet by Paul Rudnick
- Morning Star
- Cat on a Hot Tin Roof by Tennessee Williams
- The Voysey Inheritance by Harley Granville-Barker
- Over the Tavern
- Sockdology by Jeffrey Hatcher

=== Asolo Rep in the Cook Theatre ===
- My Way
- Art by Yasmina Reza, translated by Christopher Hampton

=== FSU/Asolo Conservatory in the Cook Theatre ===
- Rumors by Neil Simon
- The Physicists by Friedrich Dürrenmatt
- Stop Kiss by Diana Son
- The Memory of Water by Shelagh Stephenson

== 2001–2002 ==
=== Asolo Rep in the Mertz Theatre ===
- A Christmas Carol
- A Flea in Her Ear by Georges Feydeau
- Da by Hugh Leonard
- Born Yesterday by Garson Kanin
- The Hollow by Agatha Christie
- Twelfth Night by William Shakespeare
- The Tale of the Allergist's Wife by Charles Busch

=== Asolo Rep in the Cook Theatre ===
- SantaLand Diaries by David Sedaris, adapted by Joe Mantello
- Fully Committed by Becky Mode and Mark Setlock

=== FSU/Asolo Conservatory in the Cook Theatre ===
- The Years
- Fuddy Meers by David Lindsay-Abaire
- The Weir by Conor McPherson
- The Way of the World by William Congreve

== 2002–2003 ==
=== Asolo Rep in the Mertz Theatre ===
- Inherit the Wind by Jerome Lawrence and Robert Edwin Lee
- You Never Can Tell by George Bernard Shaw
- Brighton Beach Memoirs by Neil Simon
- A Christmas Carol
- The Corn is Green by Emlyn Williams
- Filumena by Eduardo De Filippo
- The Philadelphia Story by Philip Barry

=== Asolo Rep in the Cook Theatre ===
- Eye of the Storm
- Frank Lloyd Wright
- Syncopation

=== FSU/Asolo Conservatory in the Cook Theatre ===
- The Blue Room by David Hare
- The Conservationist
- The Imaginary Invalid by Molière
- The Heiress by Ruth Goetz and Augustus Goetz

== 2003–2004 ==
=== Asolo Rep in the Mertz Theatre ===
- The Crucible by Arthur Miller
- The Road to Ruin
- The Millionairess by George Bernard Shaw
- Murder by Misadventure by Edward Taylor
- I'm Not Rappaport by Herb Gardner
- The Diary of Anne Frank by Frances Goodrich and Albert Hackett
- Hay Fever by Noël Coward

=== Asolo Rep in the Cook Theatre ===
- Noël Coward at the Café de Paris
- Free and Clear

=== FSU/Asolo Conservatory in the Cook Theatre ===
- The Competition
- The Shape of Things by Neil LaBute
- The Taming of the Shrew by William Shakespeare
- Arms and the Man by George Bernard Shaw

=== Late Night Series ===
- Hits, Bits & Skits
- Huma's Loom
- Idiot Servant
- No Exit by Jean-Paul Sartre
- The London Project
- Redemption
- Breaks
- Penis Play
- Emu Farm
- Music for Friends
- A Charlie Brown Christmas
- The Marriage Proposal by Anton Chekhov
- My Prodigal Son

== 2004–2005 ==
=== Asolo Rep in the Mertz Theatre ===
- Peter Pan
- Sherlock Holmes & the West End Horror
- Broadway Bound by Neil Simon
- The Smell of the Kill by Michele Lowe
- The Front Page by Ben Hecht and Charles MacArthur
- A Midsummer Night's Dream by William Shakespeare
- Menopause The Musical by Jeanie Linders

=== Asolo Rep in the Cook Theatre ===
- Mitch Albom's Tuesdays with Morrie by Mitch Albom and Jeffrey Hatcher

=== FSU/Asolo Conservatory in the Cook Theatre ===
- The Two Gentlemen of Verona by William Shakespeare
- Boston Marriage by David Mamet
- Love's Fire: Seven New Plays Inspired by Seven Shakespearean Sonnets by Wendy Wasserstein, Eric Bogosian, William Finn, John Guare, Marsha Norman, Tony Kushner, Ntozake Shange
- The Island of Slaves by Pierre de Marivaux, adapted by Eb Thomas and Barbara Redmond

=== Late Night Series ===
- The Minotaur
- Swing State
- A Benefit Concert with Bill Deasy
- The Louisiana Hayride presents: Elvis
- A Night of Comedy
- The Isle of Dogs
- The Gospel of Cyrus According to Cyrus

== 2005–2006 ==
=== Asolo Rep in the Mertz Theatre ===
- Laughing Stock
- Enchanted April by Elizabeth von Arnim, adapted by Matthew Barber
- A Christmas Carol
- Trying
- Anything to Declare?
- To Kill a Mockingbird
- Lady Windermere's Fan by Oscar Wilde
- Crowns

=== Asolo Rep in the Cook Theatre ===
- String of Pearls
- Rounding Third

=== FSU/Asolo Conservatory in the Cook Theatre ===
- Mirandolina by Bohuslav Martinů
- What the Butler Saw by Joe Orton
- Five by Tenn by Tennessee Williams
- Pericles by William Shakespeare

== 2006–2007 ==
=== Asolo Rep in the Mertz Theatre ===
- Amadeus by Peter Shaffer
- Men of Tortuga by Jason Wells
- The Plexiglass Slipper
- Expecting Isabel by Lisa Loomer
- A Few Good Men by Aaron Sorkin
- Pride and Prejudice
- Ella

=== Asolo Rep in the Historic Asolo Theater ===
- Nobody Don't Like Yogi

=== Asolo Rep in the Cook Theatre ===
- Darwin in Malibu by Crispin Whittell

=== FSU/Asolo Conservatory in the Historic Asolo Theater ===
- The Parisian Woman

=== FSU/Asolo Conservatory in the Cook Theatre ===
- This is Our Youth by Kenneth Lonergan
- The Bacchae by Euripides
- Blue Window by Craig Lucas

=== Late Night Series ===
- American Buffalo by David Mamet

== 2007–2008 ==
=== Asolo Rep in the Mertz Theatre ===
- A Tale of Two Cities by Jill Santoriello
- The Constant Wife by W. Somerset Maugham
- Doubt: A Parable by John Patrick Shanley
- The Play's the Thing by Ferenc Molnár, adapted by P. G. Wodehouse
- Smash by Jeffrey Hatcher, (an adaptation of George Bernard Shaw's Novel An Unsocial Socialist)
- Equus by Peter Shaffer
- Working, A Musical – book by Stephen Schwartz and Nina Faso; music by Schwartz, Craig Carnelia, Micki Grant, Mary Rodgers, James Taylor, Lin-Manuel Miranda; lyrics by Schwartz, Carnelia, Grant, Taylor, Miranda, and Susan Birkenhead
- Menopause the Musical™ by Jeanie Linders

=== Asolo Rep in the Historic Asolo Theater ===
- The Blonde, the Brunette and the Vengeful Redhead by Robert Hewett

=== Asolo Rep in the Cook Theatre ===
- Misery
- Lady

=== FSU/Asolo Conservatory in the Historic Asolo Theater ===
- Murder by Poe by Jeffrey Hatcher (an adaptation of five stories by Edgar Allan Poe)

=== FSU/Asolo Conservatory in the Cook Theatre ===
- Speed-the-Plow by David Mamet
- The Duchess of Malfi by John Webster
- The Underpants by Steve Martin (adapted from a play by Carl Sternheim)

=== Late Night Series ===
- 1st Annual Love Late Night
- A People's Movement by Marcus D. Johnson

== 2008–2009 ==
=== Asolo Rep in the Mertz Theatre ===
- Barnum – book by Mark Bramble; lyrics by Michael Stewart; music by Cy Coleman
- The Imaginary Invalid by Molière, adapted by Constance Congdon
- Inventing van Gogh by Steven Dietz
- The Winter's Tale by William Shakespeare
- Murderers by Jeffrey Hatcher
- The Devil's Disciple by George Bernard Shaw
- Souvenir by Stephen Temperley

=== Asolo Rep in the Historic Asolo Theater ===
- The Giver
- This Wonderful Life
- Visiting Mr. Green by Jeff Baron

=== Asolo Rep in the Cook Theatre ===
- Perfect Mendacity by Jason Wells

=== FSU/Asolo Conservatory in the Historic Asolo Theater ===
- Three Postcards by Craig Lucas and Craig Carnelia

=== FSU/Asolo Conservatory in the Cook Theatre ===
- Wilder! Wilder! Wilder! by Thornton Wilder
- Blur by Melanie Marnich
- Miss Julie by August Strindberg

=== Late Night Series ===
- American Buffalo by David Mamet
- 2nd Annual Love Late Night

== 2009–2010 ==
=== Asolo Rep in the Mertz Theatre ===
- Contact created by Susan Stroman and John Weidman; October 24, 2009 – November 29, 2009
- The Perfume Shop adapted by E.P. Dowdall, based on the play Parfumerie by Miklós László; December 4, 2009 – April 1, 2010
- Life of Galileo by Bertolt Brecht; December 11, 2009 – February 23, 2010
- Searching for Eden: The Diaries of Adam and Eve by James Still, based partly on the comic writing of Mark Twain; December 18, 2009 – February 25, 2010
- Hearts by Willy Holtzman; January 22, 2010 – April 11, 2010
- Managing Maxine by Janece Shaffer; March 12, 2010 – April 17, 2010
- Dancing Backwards in High Heels – The Ginger Musical conceived & developed by Lynnette Barkley & Christopher McGovern; May 7, 2010 – May 30, 2010

=== Asolo Rep in the Historic Asolo Theatre ===
- New Stages Project: Life in the Middle; October 21, 2009 – November 8, 2009
- The Last Five Years by Jason Robert Brown; January 21, 2010 – February 28, 2010
- Unplugged: Theatre in the Raw – New Play Festival; March 24, 2010 – April 18, 2010

=== The FSU/Asolo Conservatory for Actor Training ===
- The Mystery Plays by Roberto Aguirre-Sacasa; October 27, 2009 – November 15, 2009
- Blue/Orange by Joe Penhall; January 5, 2010 – January 24, 2010
- Machinal by Sophie Treadwell; March 2, 2010 – March 21, 2010
- The Game of Love and Chance by Pierre Marivaux; April 14, 2010 – May 3, 2010

=== Late Night Series ===
- 3rd Annual Love Late Night
- Dutchman by Amiri Baraka
- Tunes for Two
- The Rachel Corrie Project edited by Kirstin Franklin

== 2010–2011 ==
=== Asolo Rep in the Mertz Theatre ===
- Bonnie & Clyde: A New Musical (Pre-Broadway Run) by Frank Wildhorn (music), Don Black (lyrics), and Ivan Menchell (book), directed by Jeff Calhoun; November 19, 2010 – December 19, 2010
- La Bête by David Hirson, directed by Michael Donald Edwards; January 27, 2011 – February 24, 2011
- Twelve Angry Men by Reginald Rose, directed by Frank Galati; January 14, 2011 – March 31, 2011
- Boeing Boeing by Marc Camoletti, translated by Beverley Cross & Francis Evans, directed by Greg Leaming; January 21, 2011 – April 23, 2011
- Deathtrap by Ira Levin, directed by Peter Amster; March 11, 2011 – May 14, 2011
- Las Meninas (The Waiting Women) by Lynn Nottage, directed by Michael Donald Edwards; March 18, 2011 – May 15, 2011

=== Asolo Rep Touring Company ===
- Antigone Now by Melissa Cooper (based on Antigone by Sophocles); preview on October 4, 2010, followed by a performance on October 9, 2010, and then TBA touring dates

=== Asolo Rep Off-Main ===
- George Gershwin Alone by Hershey Felder; May 19, 2011 – June 5, 2011
- Beethoven, As I Knew Him by Hershey Felder; June 8, 2011 – June 12, 2011
- Asolo Rep UNPLUGGED 2011 (A new works festival, comprising a world premiere of a new play, and four staged readings of new works); – April 15, 2011 – May 14, 2011

=== The FSU/Asolo Conservatory for Actor Training ===
- The Two Gentlemen of Verona by William Shakespeare, directed by Greg Leaming; October 26, 2010 – November 14, 2010
- reasons to be pretty by Neil LaBute, directed by Barbara Redmond; January 4, 2011 – January 23, 2011
- The Lady from the Sea by Henrik Ibsen, directed by Andrei Malaev-Babel; February 22, 2011 – March 13, 2011
- Tartuffe by Molière, directed by Wes Grantom; April 12, 2011 – May 1, 2011

=== Late Night Series ===
- Red Light Winter by Adam Rapp
- The London Monologues by Adam Carpenter, Kim Hausler, Ron Kagan, Will Little, and Angela Sauer
- The Thrill of the Chase by Philip Gawthorne
- Men of Tortuga by Jason Wells
- 4th Annual Love Late Night

== 2016–2017 ==
=== Asolo Rep in the Mertz Theatre ===
- Guys and Dolls, based on a story by and characters of Damon Runyon, book by Jo Swerling and Abe Burrows, music and lyrics by Frank Loesser. Choreographed and directed by Josh Rhodes, November 15, 2016 – January 1, 2017.
- The Great Society, by Robert Schenkkan, based on the original production directed by Bill Rauch. Directed by Nicole A. Watson, January 11–April 2, 2017.
- The Originalist, by John Strand. Directed by Molly Smith, January 18–March 7, 2017.
- Born Yesterday, by Garson Kanin. Directed by Peter Amster, February 8–April 15, 2017.
- The Little Foxes, by Lillian Hellman. Directed by Frank Galati, March 17-April 15, 2017.
- The Elaborate Entrance of Chad Deity, by Kristoffer Diaz. Directed by Jen Wineman, April 4–30, 2017 (a special production in the Cook Theatre).
- Beatsville, book by Glenn Slater, music and lyrics by Wendy Leigh Wilf. Directed by Bill Berry, April 27-May 27, 2017 (world premier, a co-production with Seattle's 5th Avenue Theatre).
- Twenty Thousand Leagues Under the Seas, by Craig Francis and Rick Miller, based on the 1870 book by Jules Verne. Directed by Rick Miller, June 7-July 1, 2017.

=== The FSU/Asolo Conservatory for Actor Training in the Cook Theatre ===
- Book of Days, by Lanford Wilson. Directed by Greg Leaming, November 1–20, 2016.
- A View From The Bridge, by Arthur Miller. Directed by Andrei Malaev-Babel, December 27, 2016 – January 15, 2017.
- The Drunken City, by Adam Bock. Directed by Jesse Jou, February 21–March 12, 2017.
- A Midsummer Night's Dream, by William Shakespeare. Directed by Jonathan Epstein, April 11–29, 2017 (presented in collaboration with and at the Marie Selby Botanical Gardens).

=== Dog Days Theatre ===
- Relatively Speaking, by Alan Ayckbourn. Directed by Brendon Fox, July 11–30, 2017.
- Double Indemnity, by James M. Cain. Directed by Greg Leaming, January 11–April 2, 2017.

== 2017–2018 ==
=== Asolo Rep in the Mertz Theatre ===
- Evita, lyrics by Tim Rice, music by Andrew Lloyd Webber. Directed and choreographed by Josh Rhodes, November 18–December 30, 2017 (Previews November 15–17).
- Shakespeare in Love, based on the screenplay by Marc Norman and Tom Stoppard, adapted for the stage by Lee Hall. Directed by Rachel Rockwell, January 13–March 28, 2018 (Previews January 10–12).
- The Morning After Grace, by Carey Crim. Directed by Peter Amster, January 19–March 4, 2018 (Previews January 17–18).
- Rhinoceros, by Eugene Ionesco, translated by Derek Prouse. Directed by Frank Galati, February 9-April 14, 2018 (Previews February 7–8).
- Roe, by Lisa Loomer. Directed by Lavina Jadhwani, March 16-April 14, 2018 (Previews March 14–15).
- Ragtime, book by Terrence McNally, music by Stephen Flaherty, lyrics by Lynn Ahren. Directed by Peter Rothstein, May 4–27, 2018 (Previews May 1–3) (A collaboration with Seattle's 5th Avenue Theatre).

=== Additional 2017–18 Productions ===
- Gloria, by Branden Jacobs-Jenkins. Directed by Greg Leaming, April 6–29, 2018 (Previews April 4–5), in The Cook Theatre.

=== Summer Family Production ===
- "Asolo Rep Continues Its Commitment To Present World Class, Family Friendly Productions Each June. To Be Announced Very Soon!" June 8–30, 2018 (Previews June 6–7).
