= Variations on the Death of Trotsky =

One-act comedy-drama by David Ives

Variations on the Death of Trotsky is a short one-act comedy-drama written by David Ives for the series of one-act plays titled All in the Timing. The play fictionalizes the death of Russian revolutionary Leon Trotsky through a number of distinct variations, though all from the same, historically accurate cause: a wound to the head by an ice axe—referred to in the play as a "mountain-climber's axe", for comic effect, to distinguish it from an icepick.

== Overview ==
While keeping with the tradition and style of Ives's plays of taking an odd conceit and playing it for laughs as the audience finds its feet before giving the big payoff, Variations is distinguished, along with Words, Words, Words and Philip Glass Buys a Loaf of Bread in that, while it begins comically, it may end either comically or dramatically, depending on the production. It is unique in that, of all of his works, it calls the most for an unexpectedly tragic, sentimental ending. Arguably, it is also Ives' only piece centered around a single character (while Philip Glass Buys a Loaf of Bread could be similarly considered, in fact the majority of that play is an ensemble piece).

== Synopsis ==
The play is divided into eight scenes or "variations", each depicting a differing final moment of Trotsky's life and making satirical allusions to soap opera conventions, The Honeymooners, and Act 5, Scene 1 from Hamlet. True to its title, the play calls for Trotsky to die at the end of each scene, and then continues on (after the ring of a bell) from near where the last scene left off, usually progressing the story a bit further each time. Since the play takes place on the day of Trotsky's death (one day after the attack) Trotsky is depicted throughout the show with a mountain-climber's axe sticking comically out of his skull (not an icepick, as is made clear a number of times). Though this is apparent to the audience from the very beginning, Trotsky himself does not realize that the axe is there until his wife, known only as Mrs. Trotsky, comes in with an encyclopedia from the future which tells of Trotsky's demise. The third and final character is introduced near the end of the play: Ramon Mercader, the Spanish assassin who "smashed, not buried" the axe into Trotsky's skull. Trotsky has a deep fear of icepicks, and is taken aback when he finds that his fear should have been directed towards mountain-climber axes.

After seven essentially comedic variations, the eighth involves Trotsky seeing Mercader out of the house in a civil manner, with Ramon—having posed as a gardener—revealing that he actually did perform some gardening on Trotsky's property and requesting that Trotsky go outside to admire his nasturtiums. Trotsky then comes to grips with the facts of his impending demise, settling affairs with his wife, pondering the nature of man and humanity ("So even an assassin can make the flowers grow") and reciting some future events that he will never live to know about. Finally he declares that he is in his "last room", though Mrs. Trotsky tries to explain that he is, in fact, unconscious in a hospital. Trotsky accepts that he is fortunate just to have lived for another day after the attack—that this seems to be symbolic of some sort of hope concerning human life. He decides to go look at the garden that Ramon had tended to, but before he can, he dies for the final time.

== Productions ==
Variations on the Death of Trotsky was originally presented in January 1991 at the Manhattan Punch Line Theatre (Steve Kaplan, artistic director), in New York City as part of its annual Festival of One-Act Comedies. It was directed by Jason McConell Buzas, stage managed by Kathryn J Maloney; David Waggett was the production manager. The set design was by Vaughn Patterson; the costume design was by Sharon Lynch; the lighting design was by Patt Dignan. The cast was as follows:

- Daniel Hagen as Trotsky
- Nora Mae Lyng as Mrs. Trotsky
- Steven Rodriguez as Ramon

Variations on the Death of Trotsky was performed as part of the Ives' six one-act plays All in the Timing Off-Broadway at Primary Stages in December 1993 and revived in 2013.
