= John Rando =

American stage director

John Rando is an American stage director who won the Tony Award for Best Direction of a Musical for Urinetown the Musical in 2002. He received his 2nd nomination in the same category in 2015 for the 2014 Broadway revival of On the Town.

== Early life ==
Rando grew up in Houston, Texas and attended the University of Texas in Austin, studying theatre. He received a Fulbright Program fellowship and studied theatre in Germany and Italy and then studied directing at the UCLA School of Theater, Film and Television, graduating in 1988. He next worked as an assistant director at the Old Globe Theatre (San Diego).

== Career ==
Rando has directed Off-Broadway, on Broadway and in regional theatre. His first Off-Broadway play was Fortune's Fools, by Frederick Stroppel, at the Cherry Lane Theatre in 1995. He directed the musical The Toxic Avenger, which opened Off-Broadway in 2009, after it premiered at the George Street Playhouse (New Brunswick, New Jersey).

Rando has directed several plays by David Ives Off-Broadway, including: a revival of Ancient History in May 1996 at Primary Stages, as part of a double bill with his play English Made Simple, Mere Mortals at Primary Stages in 1997, and Polish Joke at the Manhattan Theatre Club in 2003. In February 2013 he directed a revival of Ives' All in the Timing at Primary Stages, and received a 2013 Obie Award for Direction. He also directed Ives' play Lives of the Saints in a Philadelphia Theatre Company production in 1999 and Berkshire Theatre Festival. Rando directed a revival of Ives' Lives of the Saints at Primary Stages in 2015.

On Broadway he made his debut in 1994 as the Assistant Director for the Arthur Miller play Broken Glass. He next directed on Broadway in 2000, with the play The Dinner Party by Neil Simon. Rando directed the musical Urinetown, which opened in 2001 and closed in 2004, and won the 2002 Tony Award for Direction of a Musical.

He is directing a new musical The Honeymooners, based on the television comedy The Honeymooners, which was created and starred Jackie Gleason. The musical has music by Stephen Weiner, lyrics by Peter Mills and the book by Dusty Kay and Bill Nuss. The musical premiered at the Paper Mill Playhouse, Milburn, New Jersey on September 28, 2017, and stars Michael McGrath as Ralph Kramden, Michael Mastro as Ed Norton, Leslie Kritzer as Alice Kramden, and Laura Bell Bundy as Trixie Norton.

Rando directed several staged concerts of musicals for New York City Center's Encores!: Strike Up the Band (1998), Do Re Mi (1999) The Pajama Game (2002), On the Town (2008), Damn Yankees (2008), Gentlemen Prefer Blondes (2012), It's a Bird...It's a Plane...It's Superman (2013), Little Me (2014) and The New Yorkers (2017).

== Stage productions (select) ==
- 1994 Broken Glass (Assistant Director) (Broadway)
- 2000 The Dinner Party (Broadway)
- 2001 A Thousand Clowns (Broadway)
- 2001 Urinetown (Broadway)
- 2002 Dance of the Vampires (Broadway)
- 2005 Escape: 6 Ways to Get Away (Miami)
- 2006 The Wedding Singer (Broadway)
- 2009 The Toxic Avenger Musical (Off-Broadway)
- 2009 The Toxic Avenger Musical (Toronto)
- 2012 A Christmas Story: The Musical (Broadway)
- 2014 Rosencrantz and Guildenstern Are Dead (Off-Broadway)
- 2014 On the Town (Broadway)
- 2015 Penn & Teller on Broadway (Broadway)
- 2016 The Secret on Broadway (Broadway)
- 2018 Jerry Springer - The Opera (Off-Broadway)
- 2018 The Royal Family of Broadway (Barrington Stage Company)
- 2021, 2023, 2026 Back to the Future: The Musical (London, Broadway, Hamburg)

== Awards and nominations ==
Year	Title	Award	Category	Result
2002	Urinetown the Musical	Tony Award	Best Direction of a Musical	Won
2002	Urinetown the Musical	Drama Desk Award	Outstanding Direction of a Musical	Nominated
2002	Urinetown the Musical	Outer Critics Circle Award	Outstanding Director of a Musical	Won
2015	On the Town	Tony Award	Best Direction of a Musical	Nominated
