= Ramón Mercader =

Assassin of Leon Trotsky (1913–1978)

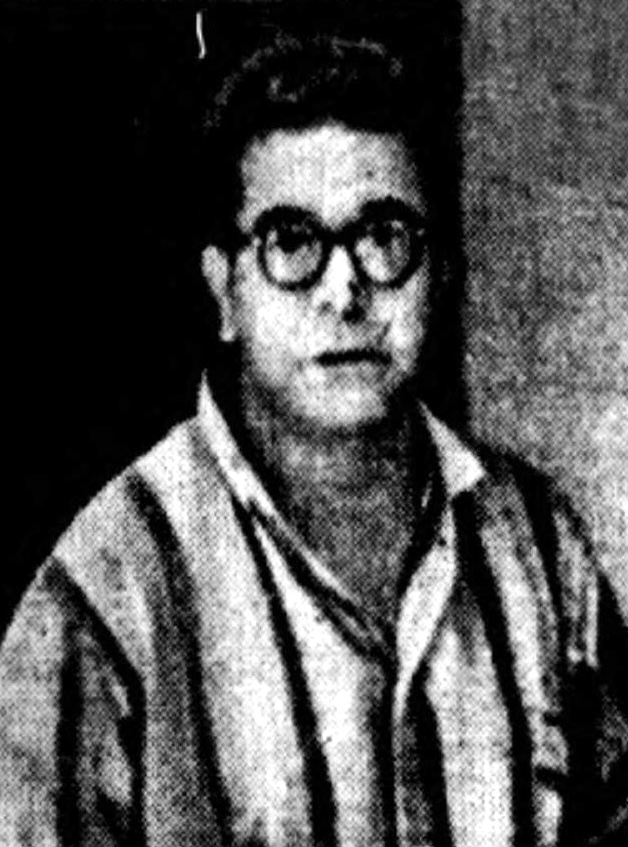
- Mercader, c. 1953
- Born: Jaime Ramón Mercader del Río; 7 February 1913; Argentona, Catalonia, Spain
- Died: 18 October 1978 (aged 65); Havana, La Habana, Cuba
- Resting place: Kuntsevo Cemetery, Moscow, Russia
- Other names: Jacques Mornard; Frank Jacson; Ramón Ivánovich López; Leon Jacome; Leon Haikys (not to be confused with Leon Gaikis)
- Occupations: Waiter; militiaman; soldier; secret agent of the NKVD
- Spouse: Roquelia Mendoza Buenabad
- Children: 3
- Parents: Pablo Mercader Marina (father); Caridad del Río Hernández (mother)
- Relatives: María Mercader (cousin)
- Status: Deceased
- Conviction: Murder
- Penalty: 20 years imprisonment

Jaime Ramón Mercader del Río (Catalan pronunciation: [rəˈmom məɾkəˈðe]; 7 February 1913 – 18 October 1978) was a Spanish communist and NKVD secret agent who assassinated the revolutionary Leon Trotsky in Mexico City in August 1940 with an ice axe, for which Mercader was imprisoned for 19 years and 8 months.

In 1960, after release from Mexican imprisonment, Mercader was awarded the Hero of the Soviet Union medal and the Order of Lenin medal, and lived at different times in Cuba, the Soviet Union, and Czechoslovakia.

== Life ==
Jaime Ramón Mercader del Río was born on 7 February 1913 in the town of Argentona, in Maresme county, Catalonia, Spain, to Eustacia María Caridad del Río Hernández (aka Caridad Mercader), daughter of a Cantabrian merchant who became rich from his business in the Captaincy General of Cuba, and Pablo Mercader Marina, son of a Catalonian textile industrialist. Jaime Ramón was raised in France by his mother Caridad, who also was a communist who fought in the Spanish Civil War, and also served in the Soviet international underground.

In the mid-1930s, young Mercader became a Communist and worked for leftist organizations during the existence of the Second Spanish Republic (1931–1939). He was imprisoned for his political activities, but then was freed when the left-wing coalition of the Popular Front were elected as the government of Spain in 1936. During the civil war, he was recruited by Nahum Eitingon, an officer of the NKVD (People's Commissariat for Internal Affairs, the Soviet secret police), who sent Mercader for secret agent training in the USSR.

Mercader befriended and infiltrated the Trotskyist communist faction during the Spanish Civil War. As a secret agent of the NKVD, Mercader met with the war correspondent David Crook, an English communist and volunteer soldier for the Republican side, in the city of Albacete, Castilla–La Mancha, and there taught him the Spanish language and trained him in the techniques of espionage. Moreover, as a correspondent for the News Chronicle, Crook spied on fellow volunteer George Orwell and other militiamen of the POUM (Workers’ Party of Marxist Unification) and the Independent Labour Party.

== Assassination of Trotsky ==
In 1938, whilst a student at the University of Paris (the Sorbonne), with the help of NKVD Agent Mark Zborowski, Mercader befriended Sylvia Ageloff, a young intellectual from Brooklyn, New York, who also was a confidante of Trotsky in Paris. As friend to Ageloff, Mercader assumed the identity of Jacques Mornard, the son of a Belgian diplomat. In 1939, a man from the Bureau of the Fourth International communicated with Mercader; and the student Ageloff had returned to Brooklyn in September 1939, where Mercader joined her under the assumed Canadian identity of Frank Jacson, facilitated by and with the passport of Tony Babich, a Canadian volunteer soldier in the Spanish Republican Army killed in battle. To assuage her suspicions about his true identity, Mercader told Ageloff that he had bought a false identity in order to avoid military service.

In October 1939, Mercader moved to Mexico City and persuaded Ageloff to join him there. Leon Trotsky was living with his family in Coyoacán, then a village on the southern fringes of Mexico City. He was exiled from the Soviet Union after losing the power struggle against Stalin's rise to power.

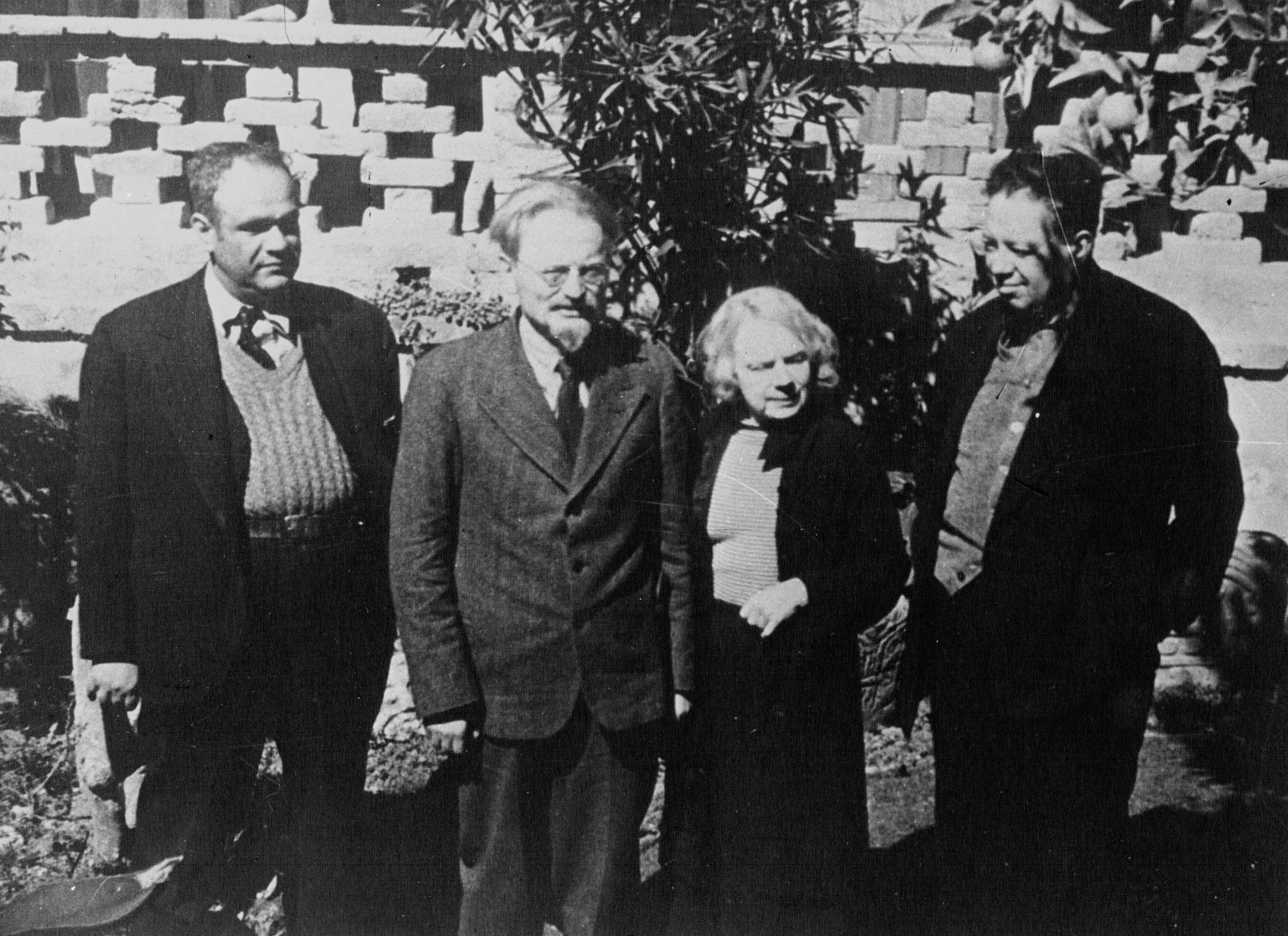
Trotsky and his wife in Mexico in 1937

Trotsky had been the subject of an armed attack against his house, mounted by allegedly Soviet-recruited locals, including the Marxist–Leninist muralist David Alfaro Siqueiros. The attack was organised and prepared by Pavel Sudoplatov, deputy director of the foreign department of the NKVD. In his memoirs, Sudoplatov claimed that, in March 1939, he had been taken by his chief, Lavrentiy Beria, to see Stalin. Stalin told them that "if Trotsky is finished the threat will be eliminated" and gave the order that "Trotsky should be eliminated within a year."

After that attack failed, a second team was sent, headed by Eitingon, formerly the deputy NKVD agent in Spain. He allegedly was involved in the kidnap, torture, and murder of Andreu Nin. The new plan was to send a lone assassin against Trotsky. The team included Mercader and his mother Caridad. Sudoplatov claimed in his autobiography Special Tasks that he selected Ramón Mercader for the task of carrying out the assassination.

Through his lover Sylvia Ageloff's access to the Coyoacán house, Mercader, as Jacson, began to meet with Trotsky, posing as a sympathizer to his ideas, befriending his guards, and doing small favors. He made drawings of the villa to help the other groups of assassins. Trotsky's grandson Esteban Volkov, aged 14 at the time of the assassination, emphasized that Jacson had been present in Trotsky's house during the first attack led by Siqueiros.

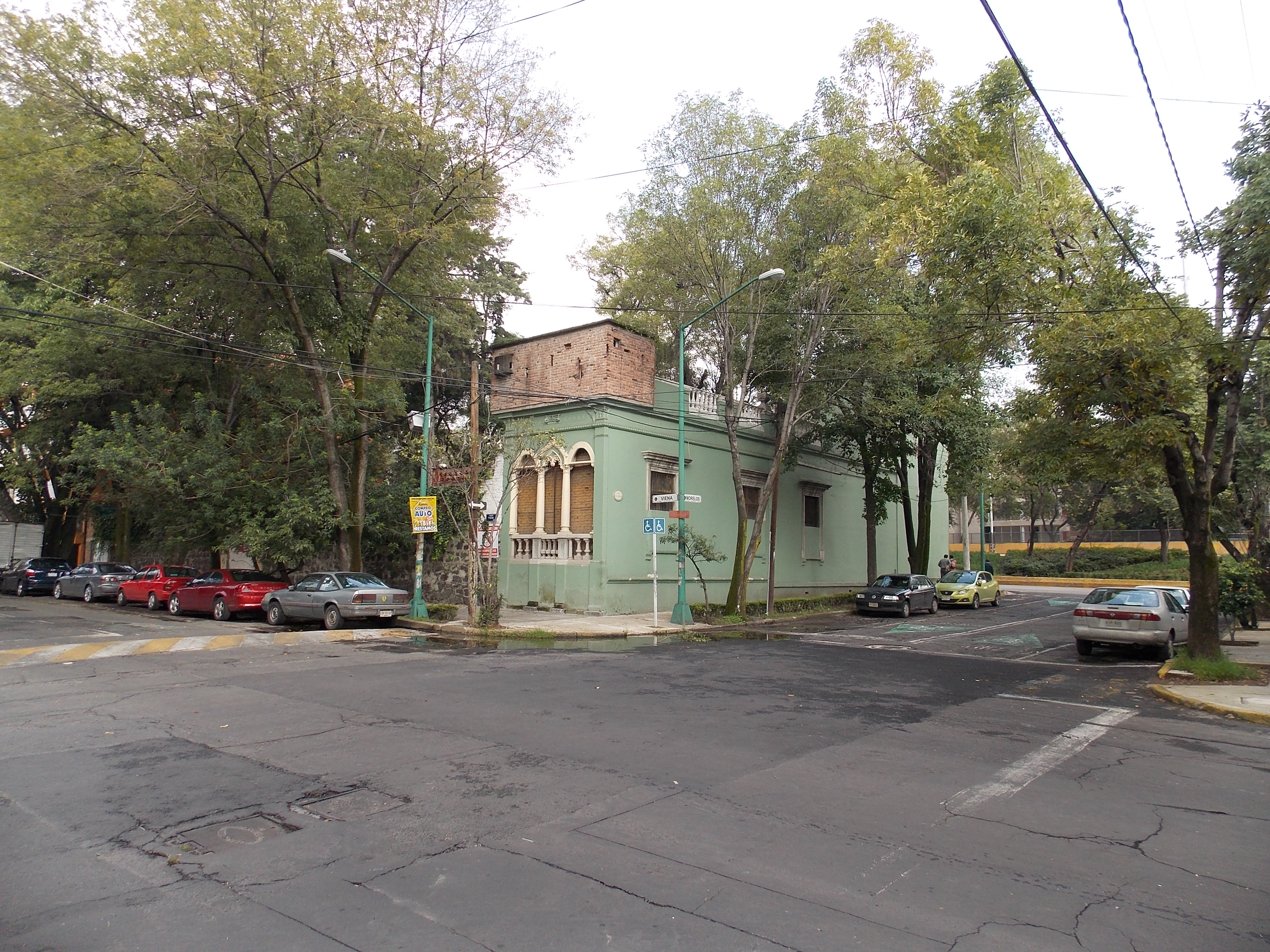
Trotsky's house in Coyoacán, currently the León Trotsky House Museum

On 20 August 1940, Mercader was alone with Trotsky in his study under the pretext of showing the older man a document. Mercader struck Trotsky from behind and mortally wounded him on the head with an ice axe while he was looking at the document.

The blow failed to kill Trotsky, and he got up and grappled with Mercader. Hearing the commotion, Trotsky's guards burst into the room and beat Mercader nearly to death. Trotsky, severely wounded but still conscious, ordered them not to kill the attacker so he could speak.

Caridad and Eitingon were waiting outside the compound in separate cars to provide a getaway, but when Mercader failed to return, they left and fled the country.

Trotsky was taken to a hospital in the city and operated on but died the next day as a result of severe brain injuries.

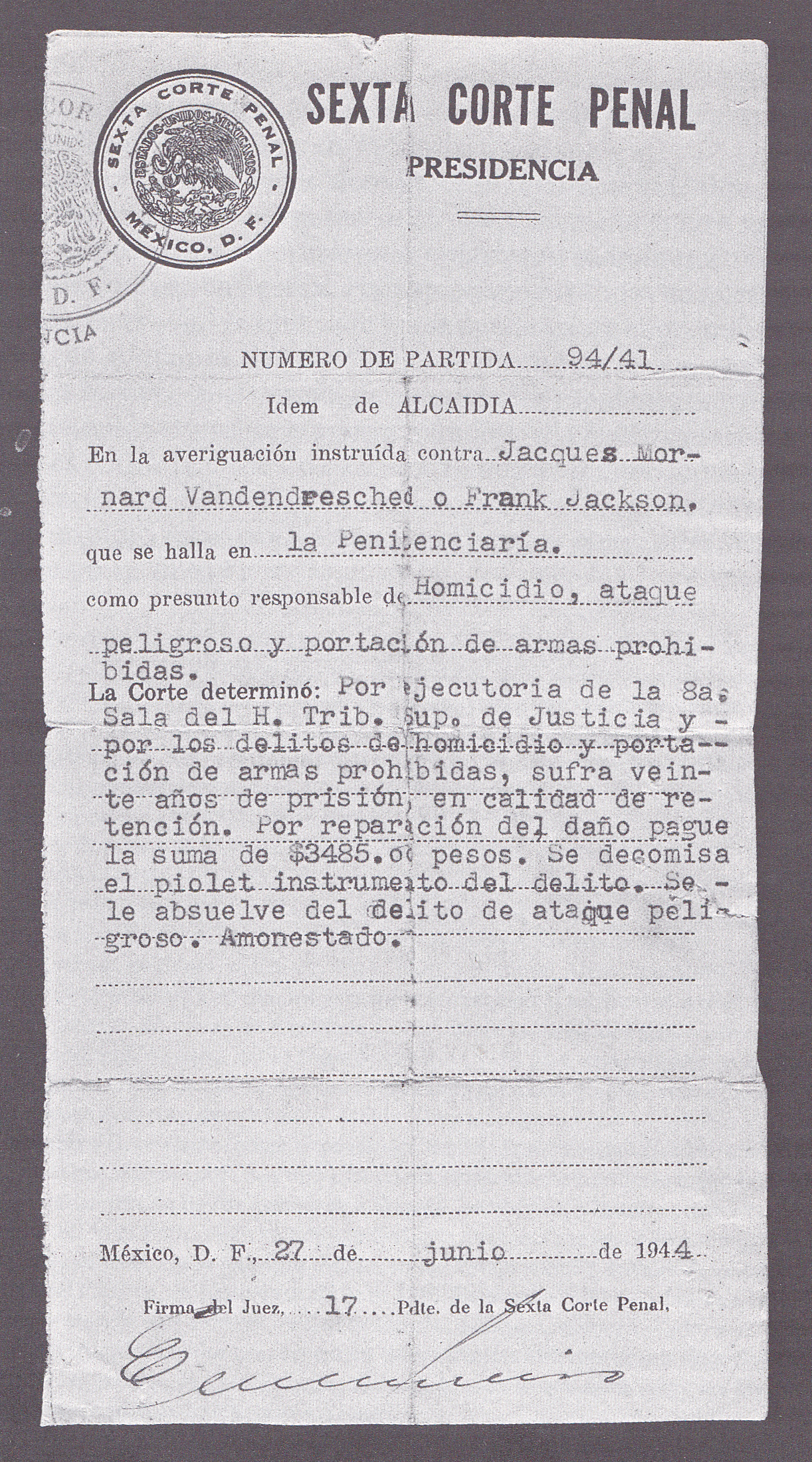
Official copy (dated 1944) of the sentencing decision passed by the Mexican court on Mercader, listed as "Jacques Mornard Vandendresched or Frank Jackson"

Trotsky's guards turned Mercader over to the Mexican authorities. He refused to acknowledge his true identity. He only identified himself as Jacques Mornard. Mercader claimed to the police that he had wanted to marry Ageloff, but Trotsky forbade the wedding. He alleged that a violent quarrel with Trotsky had led to his decision to murder him.

Mercader stated:

... instead of finding myself face to face with a political chief who was directing the struggle for the liberation of the working class, I found myself before a man who desired nothing more than to satisfy his needs and desires of vengeance and of hate and who did not utilize the workers' struggle for anything more than a means of hiding his own paltriness and despicable calculations ... It was Trotsky who destroyed my nature, my future and all my affections. He converted me into a man without a name, without country, into an instrument of Trotsky. I was in a blind alley ... Trotsky crushed me in his hands as if I had been paper.

In 1943, Jacques Mornard was convicted of murder and sentenced to 20 years in prison by the Sixth Criminal Court of Mexico City. According to Stephen Schwartz, he was initially identified as Ramón Mercader by the Catalan reporter Víctor Alba, whose finding was later confirmed by the US counterintelligence project Venona.

=== Murder weapon ===
The ice axe recovered by the Mexico City police was stored in an evidence room for several years until it was "checked out" by a secret police officer, named Alfredo Salas, who claimed he wanted to preserve it "for posterity." It was a mountaineering ice axe known in French as a piolet, made by the Austrian manufacturer Werkgen Fulpmes. Mercader cut off about half the length of the handle. He claimed to be an experienced mountaineer, and bragged to police interrogators, "I had a rare ability to handle the piolet, since two blows were sufficient for me to crack through an enormous block of ice".

Salas passed the ice axe on to his daughter, Ana Alicia, who eventually put it up for sale in 2005. Trotsky's grandson, Esteban Volkov, stated that he is "unconcerned" about the fate of the alleged murder weapon and wondered "if it is the real axe." The ice axe was bought by Keith Melton, an American collector and author of books on the history of espionage, and is now on display at the International Spy Museum, in Washington, D.C.

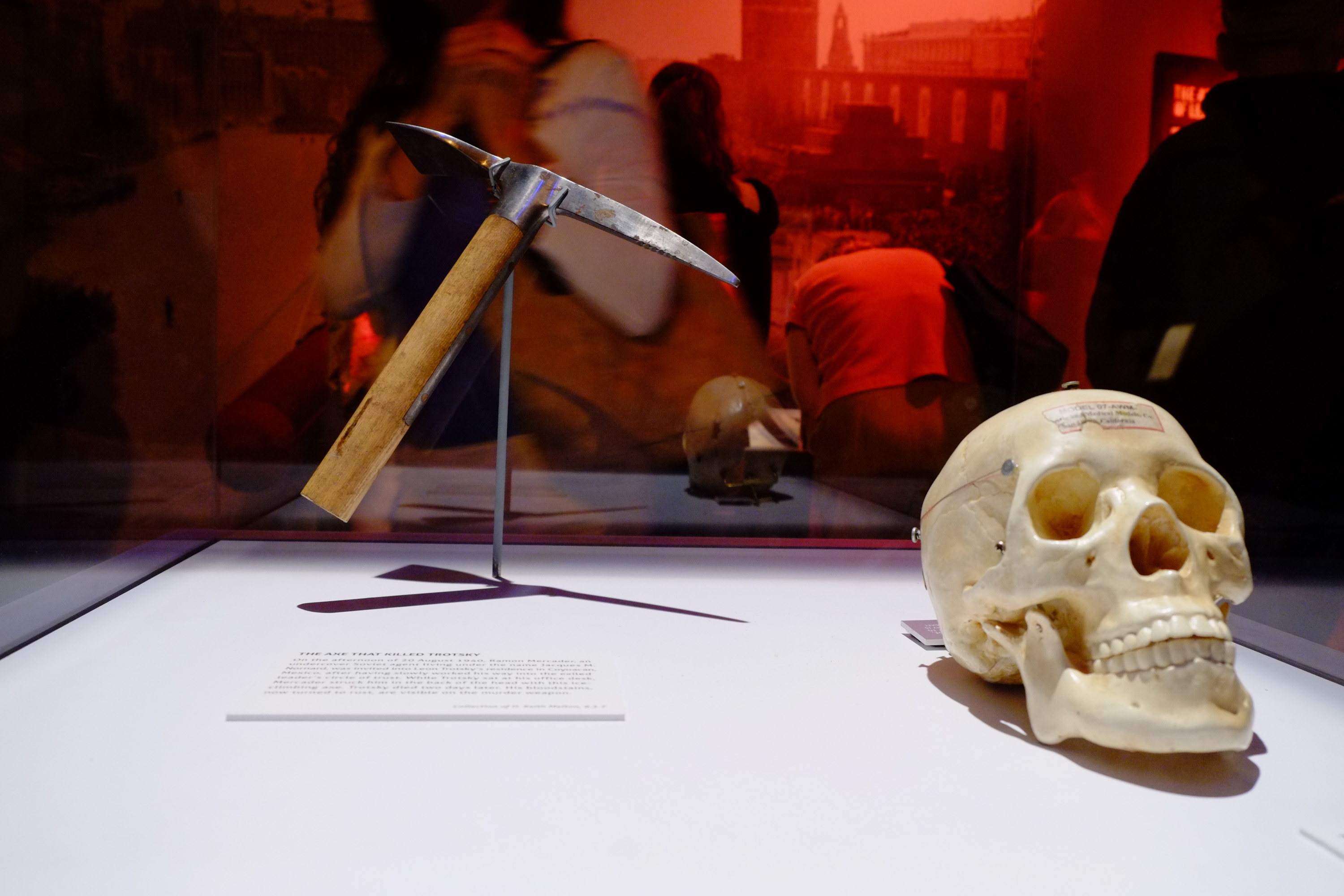
The ice axe that Mercader used to murder Leon Trotsky

== Release and honors ==
Shortly after the assassination, Joseph Stalin presented Mercader's mother Eustaquia Caridad with the Order of Lenin for her part in the operation. After the first few years in prison, Mercader requested to be released on parole, represented by Jesús Siordia and the criminologist Alfonso Quiroz Cuarón, but his request was denied by the Mexican authorities. In 1943, Caridad Mercader applied to Stalin personally, for her part in the secret operation, to release Mercader.

In 1944, she obtained a permit to leave the USSR. However, contrary to the agreed-upon conditions, she not only led that attempt at a distance but traveled to Mexico, where she was known not only as the mother of Mercader, but also as an organizer of the assassination. This undermined an undercover operation to get Mercader out of jail. Caridad's presence proved to be counterproductive; although she improved the life of Mercader in prison significantly, the Mexican authorities tightened security measures, causing the Soviets to abandon their efforts to release Mercader. Though Caridad reported important things to the Mexican authorities, Mercader served 19 years and eight months in prison (including the time under initial investigation and trial) according to the initial trial's 20-years-and-one-day conviction. Mercader, who according to his brother Luis never shared his mother's passion for the communist cause, never forgave her for her interference.

After almost 20 years in prison, Mercader was released from Mexico City's Palacio de Lecumberri prison on 6 May 1960. He moved to Havana, Cuba, where Fidel Castro's new socialist government welcomed him. In 1961, Mercader moved to the Soviet Union and subsequently was presented with the country's highest decoration, Hero of the Soviet Union, personally by Alexander Shelepin, the head of the KGB. He divided his time between Czechoslovakia, from where he traveled to different countries, Cuba, where he was the advisor of the Foreign Affairs Ministry, and the Soviet Union for the rest of his life.

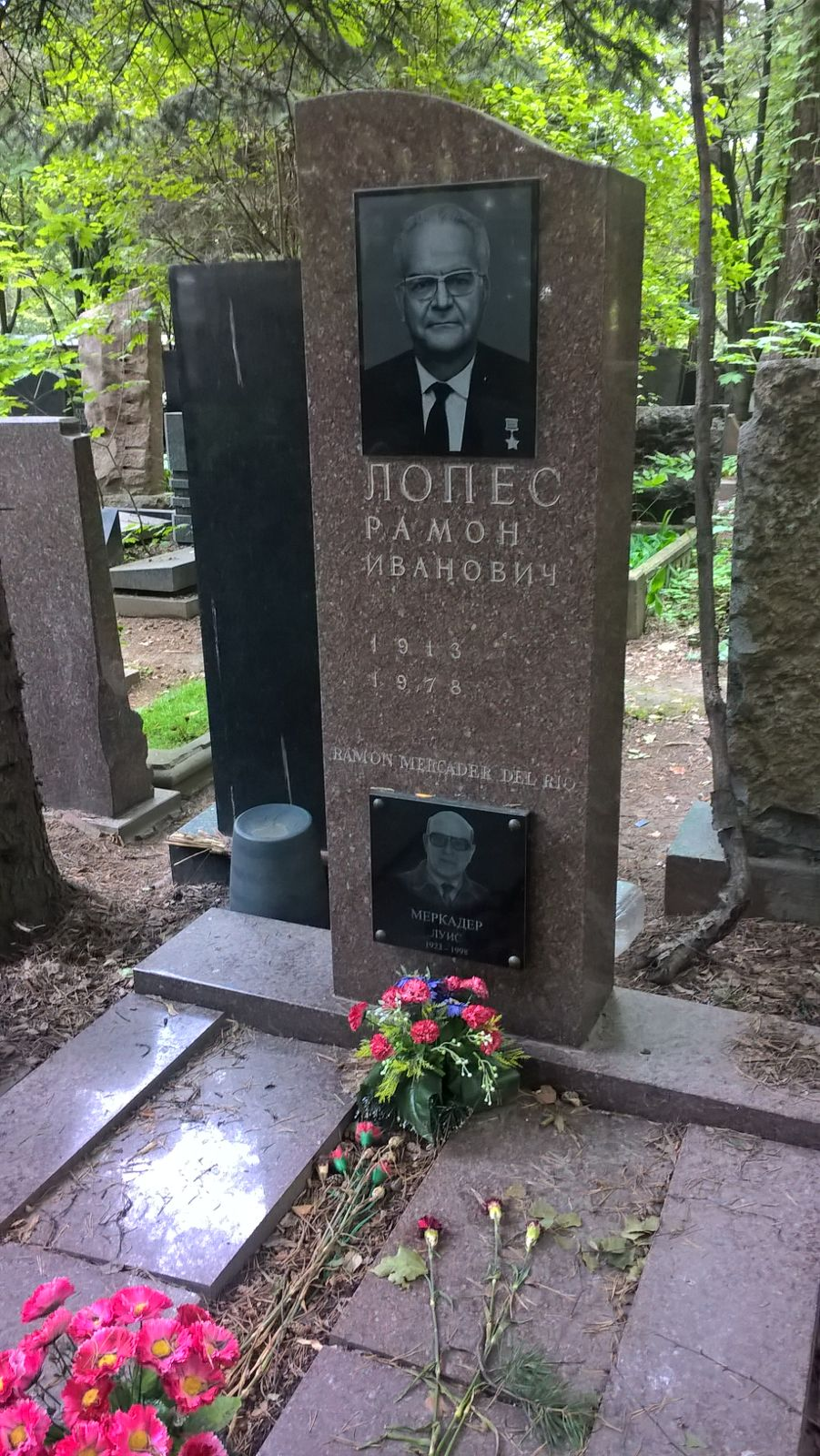
Ramon Mercader's grave in the Kuntsevo Cemetery in Moscow. He is buried under the name Ramon Ivanovich Lopez. His brother Luis Mercader is buried in the same grave.

Mercader died in Havana in 1978 of bone cancer. He is buried under the name Ramón Ivanovich Lopez (Рамон Иванович Лопес) in Moscow's Kuntsevo Cemetery.

== Decorations and awards ==
- Hero of the Soviet Union, 1940 (in absentia) according to Isaac Don Levine (1959)
- Order of Lenin

== In popular culture ==
There have been many documentaries about the assassination and Mercader over the years. A Spanish documentary about Mercader's life, called Asaltar los cielos ("Storm the skies"), was released in 1996 while a Spanish-language documentary, El Asesinato de Trotsky, was co-produced in 2006 by The History Channel and Anima Films as a joint US/Argentine production, and directed by Argentinian director Matías Gueilburt. There have been also many films, such as the 1972 Joseph Losey–directed The Assassination of Trotsky, featuring Alain Delon as Frank Jacson/Mercader and Richard Burton as Trotsky, and the 2016 film The Chosen, directed by Antonio Chavarrías and filmed in Mexico, which is an account of Trotsky's murder, featuring Alfonso Herrera as Mercader. The Trotsky assassination is depicted in the 2002 film Frida, with Mercader portrayed by Antonio Zavala Kugler (uncredited) and Trotsky by Geoffrey Rush.

In 1967, West German television presented L.D. Trotzki – Tod im Exil ("L. D. Trotsky – Death in exile"), a play in two parts, directed by August Everding, with Peter Lühr in the role of Trotsky. Trotsky, a 2017 Russian Netflix series, features Konstantin Khabenskiy as Trotsky and Maksim Matveyev as Mercader, who is referred in the English subtitles as "Jackson."

Trotskyist veteran Lillian Pollak depicted her friendship with Mercader, then known as Frank Jacson, and the assassination of Trotsky in her self-published 2008 novel The Sweetest Dream while a 2009 novel by U.S. writer Barbara Kingsolver, The Lacuna, includes an account of Trotsky's assassination by "Jacson." Cuban author Leonardo Padura Fuentes' 2009 novel El hombre que amaba a los perros ("The Man Who Loved Dogs") refers to the lives of both Trotsky and Mercader.

David Ives' Variations on the Death of Trotsky is a short one-act comedy drama based on Mercader's assassination of Trotsky written for the series of one-act plays titled All in the Timing.

== See also ==
- Caridad Mercader
- África de las Heras
- Great Purge
- Leon Trotsky Museum, Mexico City
- Moscow Trials
