= English Made Simple =

Play written by David Ives

English Made Simple is a 1994 short play by David Ives.

== Plot ==
English Made Simple is the story of a couple named Jack and Jill who meet at a party. As the night progresses, it becomes apparent that the two knew each other, and were even involved romantically, before this night at the party. Meanwhile, a college English professor, whose name is never announced but written as the "Loudspeaker Voice" in the script, explains what the couple is really thinking as they talk to each other.

== Productions ==
English Made Simple premiered at the Seattle Repertory Theatre in April 1994, directed by Bill Irwin with Liz McCarthy as Jill and R. Hamilton Wright as Jack, and John Aylward as the Loudspeaker Voice.

The play was produced by Primary Stages in May 1996, as part of a double bill with Ives' play Ancient History, directed by John Rando. Ben Brantley, in his review for The New York Times, wrote: "The play is preceded by the curtain raiser 'English Made Simple,' an intellectual vaudeville more along the lines of the 'Timing' sketches. In it, the actors Megan Dodds and Kyle Fabel make the same points found in 'Ancient History' more quickly and with much less anguish."
