= Shelley Fisher Fishkin =

American academic (born 1950)

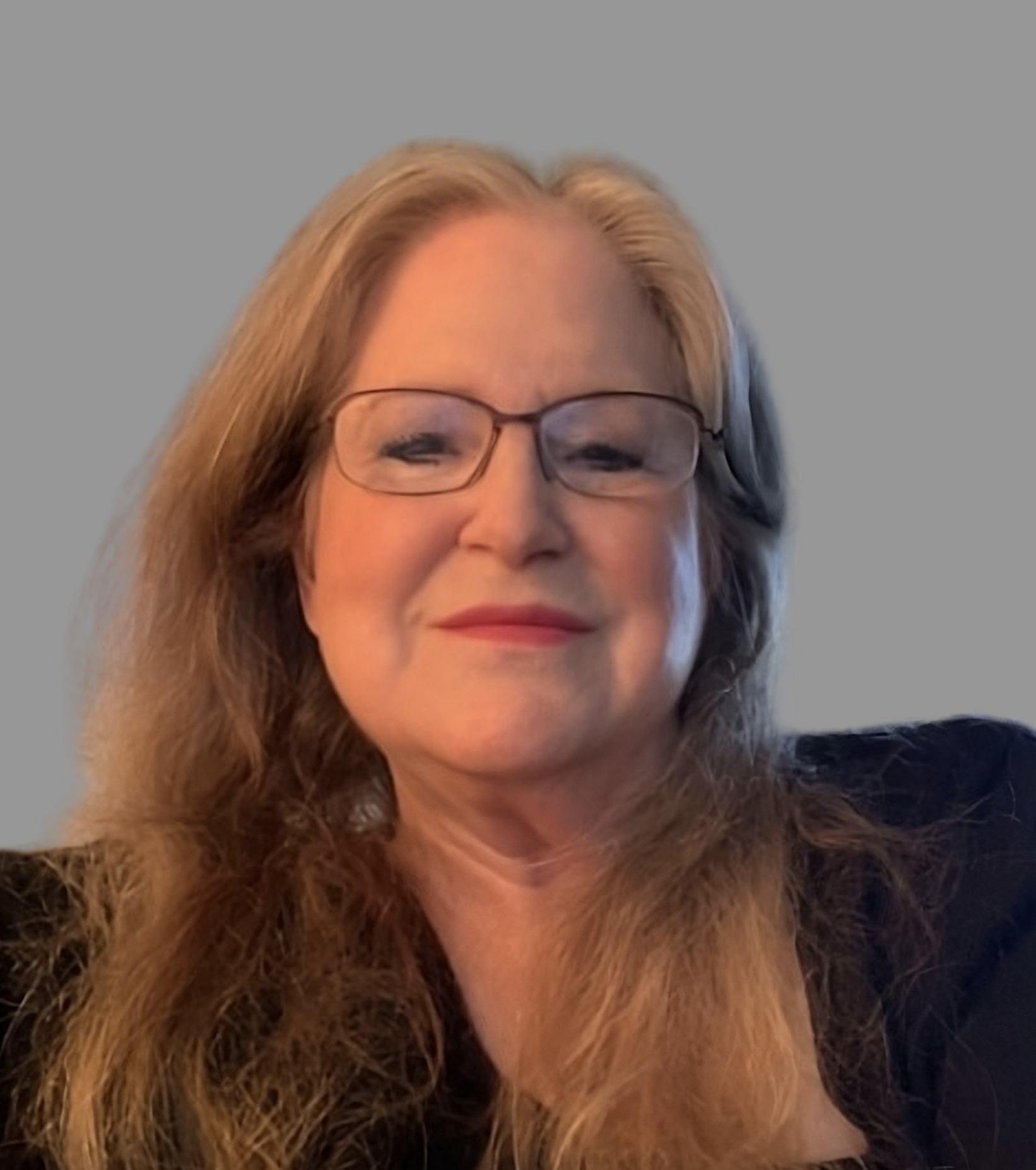
- Education: Yale University
- Occupation: Professor
- Website: shelleyfisherfishkin.com

Shelley Fisher Fishkin (born May 9, 1950) is the Joseph S. Atha Professor of the Humanities, professor of English, and (by courtesy) professor of African and African American Studies at Stanford University.

Fishkin received her B.A. and M.Phil. in English, and her Ph.D. in American studies, all from Yale University. Before teaching at Stanford University, she served as director of the Poynter Fellowship in Journalism at Yale University and professor of American studies at the University of Texas, Austin.

Fishkin served as the president of the American Studies Association (2004–2005), and the president of Mark Twain Circle of America (1998–2000). She was also the cofounder of the Charlotte Perkins Gilman Society and a founding editor of the Journal of Transnational American Studies. A specialist in Mark Twain, Fishkin was awarded the John S. Tuckey award "for lifetime achievements and contributions to Mark Twain Studies" at the International Conference on the State of Mark Twain Studies in 2017. In honor of her work in transnational American studies, the American Studies Association named its annual prize for best publication in transnational American studies the Shelley Fisher Fishkin Prize. In 2023, she was awarded the Carl Bode-Norman Holmes Pearson Prize for "Lifetime Achievement And Outstanding Contribution to American Studies" by the American Studies Association.

Fishkin is the author, editor or co-editor of 50 books. She has also published more than 150 articles, essays, columns, and reviews.

Fishkin rediscovered Mark Twain's 1898 play Is He Dead? in the archives of the Mark Twain Papers at the Bancroft Library at the University of California at Berkeley and published an edition of it in 2003. She was a producer of the play on Broadway, where it debuted in 2007, adapted by David Ives and directed by Michael Blakemore.

She served as director of Stanford's American studies program from 2003-2024, and codirector (with Gordon Chang) of the Chinese Railroad Workers in North America Project at Stanford University. In 2019, on the 150th anniversary of the completion of the transcontinental railroad, Fishkin and Chang published the co-edited volume The Chinese and the Iron Road: Building the Transcontinental Railroad.

== Selected works ==
- From Fact to Fiction: Journalism and Imaginative Writing in America (Johns Hopkins, 1985)
- Was Huck Black? Mark Twain and African-American Voices (Oxford, 1993)
- Lighting Out for the Territory: Reflections on Mark Twain and American Culture (Oxford, 1997)
- Feminist Engagements: Forays Into American Literature and Culture (Palgrave/Macmillan, 2009)
- Writing America: Literary Landmarks from Walden Pond to Wounded Knee (Rutgers University Press, 2015)
- Jim: The Life and Afterlives of Huckleberry Finn's Comrade (Yale University Press, 2025)
- co-author, Zhi Lin: In Search of the Lost History of Chinese Migrants and the Transcontinental Railroads (Tacoma Art Museum/University of Washington Press, 2017)
- editor, 29-volume Oxford Mark Twain (Oxford, 1996; paperback reprint edition, 2009)
- editor, Oxford Historical Guide to Mark Twain (Oxford, 2002)
- editor, "Is He Dead? " A New Comedy by Mark Twain (University of California, 2003)
- editor, Mark Twain's Book of Animals (University of California Press, 2009)
- editor, The Mark Twain Anthology: Great Writers on his Life and Work (Library of America, 2010)
- editor, 《为何与如何：中国人为何出国与如何进入美国》 (1871) Why and How the Chinese Emigrate, and the means they adopt for the purpose of reaching America by Russell Conwell (1871). Translated by YAO Ting [姚婷] (Chinese Overseas Publishing House, 2019)
- co-editor, Listening to Silences: New Essays in Feminist Criticism (Oxford, 1994)
- co-editor, People of the Book: Thirty Scholars Reflect on Their Jewish Identity (Wisconsin, 1996)
- co-editor, The Encyclopedia of Civil Rights in America (M.E. Sharpe, 1997)
- co-editor, Mark Twain at the Turn of the Century, 1890–1910 (Arizona Quarterly, 2005)
- co-editor, 'Sport of the Gods' and Other Essential Writing by Paul Laurence Dunbar (Random House, 2005)
- co-editor, Anthology of American Literature, ninth edition (Prentice-Hall, 2006)
- co-editor, Concise Anthology of American Literature, seventh edition (Prentice-Hall, 2011)
- co-editor, The Chinese and the Iron Road: Building the Transcontinental Railroad (Stanford University Press, 2019)
- co-editor, Race and American Culture – Oxford University Press Book Series (with Arnold Rampersad)(1993–2003)

== Selected awards and honors ==
- Frank Luther Mott-Kappa Tau Alpha Research Book Award, National Journalism Scholarship Society (for From Fact to Fiction), 1986
- Choice "Outstanding Academic Title" (for Was Huck Black? Mark Twain and African American Voices and Feminist Engagements: Forays into American Literature and Culture), 1993, 2009
- Harry H. Ransom Teaching Excellence Award, University of Texas College of Liberal Arts, 2000
- Lifetime Achievement Award in Literature, town of Westport, Connecticut, 2002
- President, American Studies Association, 2004–2005
- Runner-up for the best book award in the general nonfiction category, London Book Festival, (for Writing America) 2015
- John S. Tuckey Award for lifetime achievements and contributions to Mark Twain Studies, 2017
- Carl Bode-Norman Holmes Pearson Award for Lifetime Achievement and Outstanding Contribution to American Studies, 2023
