= Universal Language (disambiguation) =

Universal Language may refer to:

- Universal language, a hypothetical language understood by all of the world's population
- Universal Language (Booker T album), a 1977 album by Booker T & the MGs
- Universal Language (Joe Lovano album), a 1992 album by jazz saxophonist Joe Lovano
- Universal Language (2024 film), a Canadian comedy-drama film directed by Matthew Rankin
- The Universal Language, a comedic play by David Ives
- The Universal Language (2011 film), a short documentary film about Esperanto

== See also ==
- Mathematics
- Music
