= The Liar (Corneille play) =

- Original language: French
- Written by: Pierre Corneille

Premiere
- Date: 1644

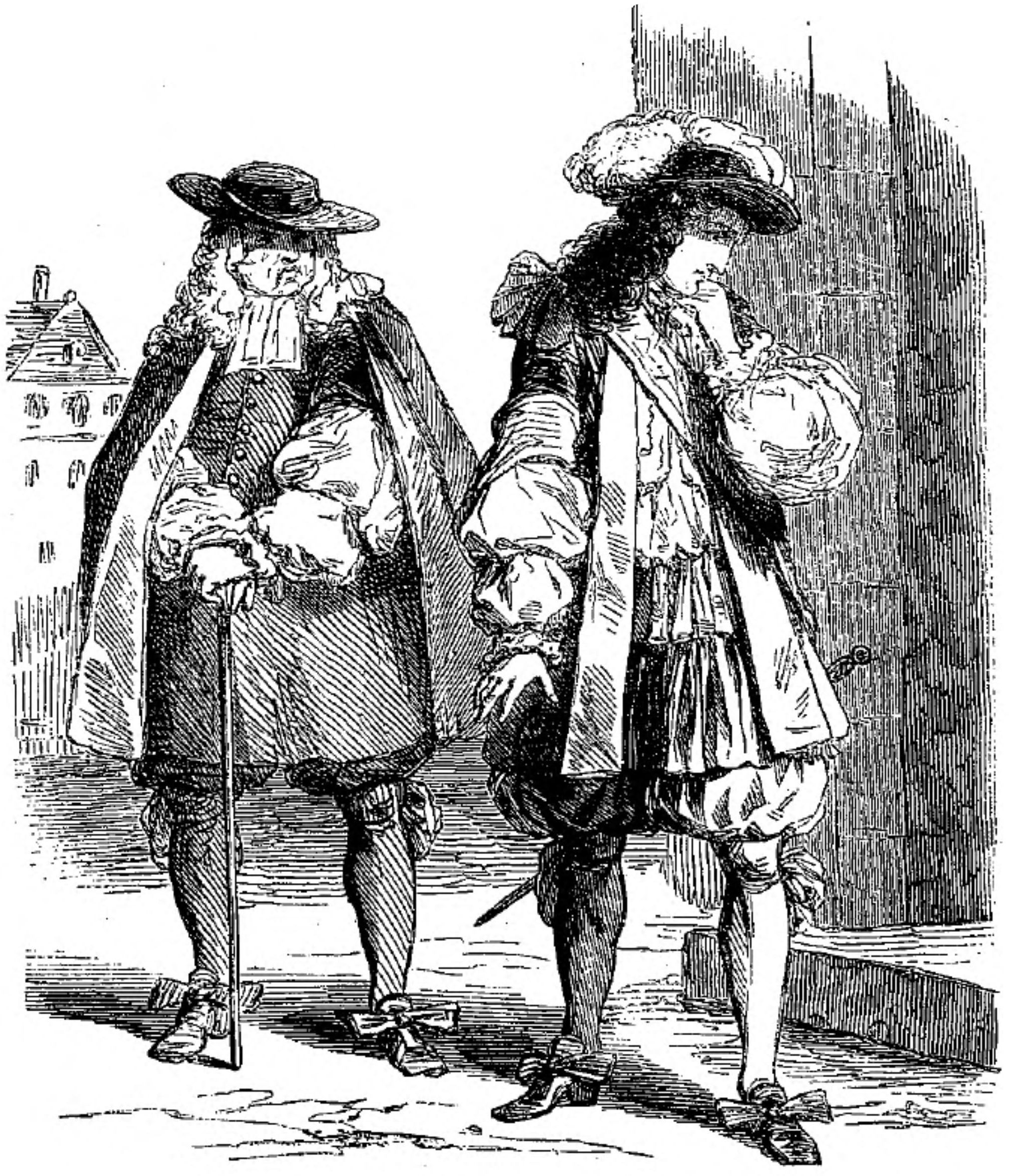

The Liar (French: Le Menteur) is a play by Pierre Corneille that was first performed in 1644. It was based on La Verdad Sospechosa by the Spanish-American playwright Juan Ruiz de Alarcón, which was published in 1634. In 1645 Corneille wrote a sequel La Suite du Menteur.

== Summary ==
Dorante, the eponymous quasi-villain of the play, meets two women in the Tuileries in Paris, whose names are Clarice and Lucrece. He impresses them with his claim to have returned recently from the wars in Germany and boasts of the vital role he played. After they leave, he decides to court Clarice, mistakenly thinking her name to be that of her friend, Lucrece.

Géronte, Dorante's father, announces to his son that he has found a girl for him to marry (Clarice). Dorante, wrongly believing that the girl that he likes is Lucrece, concocts an outrageous lie that he is already married in order to avoid having to marry Clarice.

Meanwhile, Clarice is secretly engaged to Alcippe, who happens to be a childhood friend of Dorante. Dorante sparks Alcippe’s jealousy by claiming to have held a lavish party on a river for his girlfriend, whom Alcippe believes is Clarice. When Alcippe confronts Dorante in a duel, Dorante calms him by stating that the woman he entertained on the river was married.

To build the plot, the author throws in some hysterical side characters like Dorante's butler Cliton, and Clarice's and Lucrece's servant Isabelle.

After more fabrications and complications (Dorante revealing that his "wife" is pregnant), Géronte is infuriated to discover that he was lied to; Dorante eventually tells the truth and the plot is resolved happily.

== Production history ==
The play was produced at the Old Vic theater in 1990, in a translation by Ranjit Bolt. The production was directed by Jonathan Miller and featured Alex Jennings in the title role and Desmond Barritt as Cliton. A reviewer for The Daily Telegraph described Bolt's version as "the best translation of a French play into English ever done."

A new translation and adaptation of the play by David Ives premiered at the Shakespeare Theatre Company in Washington, D.C. in Spring 2010, under the direction of Michael Kahn. A new production of Ives' script directed by William Brown was presented at Writers' Theatre in Glencoe, Illinois, from May to July, 2013.

The Los Angeles premiere of The Liar by David Ives directed by Casey Stangl was presented at the Antaeus Theatre Company in North Hollywood from October to December 2013. David Ives' version of the play was also produced by Artists Repertory Theatre in Portland (Oregon) in May 2015.

The Liar by David Ives directed by Penny Metropulos was presented at Westport Country Playhouse in Connecticut from May 5–23, 2015.

The Liar by David Ives, directed by Art Manke, was presented at Santa Cruz Shakespeare (Santa Cruz, California) from July 21 through August 29, 2015 (https://www.santacruzshakespeare.org/plays/#liar

The Liar by David Ives, directed by Michael Kahn, was offered by the Classic Stage Company in New York, January 11 to February 26, 2017.
