= Is He Dead? =

Play by Mark Twain

- Written by: Mark Twain
- Characters: (In order of appearance) Agamemnon Buckner ("Chicago"); Hans von Bismarck ("Dutchy"); Papa Leroux; Marie Leroux; Cecile Leroux; Jean-François Millet; Bastien André; Madame Bathilde; Madame Caron; Phelim O'Shaughnessy; Basil Thorpe; Claude Rivière; Charlie The King of France
- Original language: English
- Genre: Comedy, Satire
- Setting: Paris and Barbizon, 1846

Premiere
- Date premiered: December 9, 2007
- Place premiered: Lyceum Theatre

Is He Dead? is a play by Mark Twain based on his earlier 1893 short story. The play, written by Twain in 1898, was first published in print in 2003 after Mark Twain scholar Shelley Fisher Fishkin read the manuscript in the archives of the Mark Twain Papers at the University of California at Berkeley. The play was long known to scholars but never attracted much attention until Fishkin arranged to have it published in book form. She later played a primary role in getting the play produced on Broadway. Contemporary American playwright David Ives adapted the play for the modern stage before its inaugural performance in 2007. Is He Dead? is now published and licensed for theatrical use by Playscripts, Inc.

== Summary ==
The play focuses on a fictional version of the great French painter, Jean-François Millet, as an impoverished artist in Barbizon, France who, with the help of his colleagues, stages his death in order to increase the value of his paintings, and afterwards dresses as a woman to keep his secret safe. Combining elements of burlesque, farce, and social satire, the comedy relies on such devices as cross-dressing, mistaken identities, and romantic deceptions to tell its story, which raises questions about fame, greed, and the value of art.

The next day, Dutchy and O'Shaughnessy are driving up the prices of Millet's paintings, while Chicago has leaked to the press that Millet has come down with a terminal disease and has gone to the Barbary Coast to live out his remaining days. (This becomes a running gag as whenever a character asks where the Barbary Coast is, no one can answer.) Millet comes out dressed as the Widow and complains about his costume but Chicago assures him the plan will work (even though the Widow has trouble acting like a woman.) Indeed, everyone is overjoyed when Thorpe comes back to buy some paintings and buys three paintings (two of which aren't even Millet's) for 100,000 francs, instantly freeing them of their debt. The Widow is then forced to have tea with Mdme. Bathilde and Mdme. Caron alone, but they take her strange behavior as signs of grief over her brother's death. The Leroux family arrives to wait for Andre. Cecile becomes suspicious with the way the Widow and Chicago interact with each other while Marie is depressed over Millet. Andre arrives and the Widow hands him two checks to pay off the debts and stands up against his cruel behavior. Andre declares that since now the paintings are worth far more than the checks, he will take them instead. When the Widow asks if there is anything she can do to stop him, he says he will not do it if the Widow marries him. The Widow faints into Dutchy and O'Shaughnessy's arms as the act ends.

Act 2 begins months later in the Widow's new luxurious apartment in downtown Paris. Everyone is now rich because of the value of the paintings and the Widow has a butler named Charlie. Millet has since been declared dead and today is the day of Millet's funeral. Andre has continued attempting to court the Widow and Papa Leroux has even become smitten with "her" and proposes while they are alone. The Widow struggles to keep him at bay, when Inspector Lefoux (actually Cecile in disguise) comes to question the Widow over Millet's death and her relationship with Chicago. To keep the two at bay, the Widow admits Chicago is her lover. When Charlie announces more visitors, the Widow has them wait in separate rooms. Mdme. Bathilde and Mdme. Caron arrive with Marie, grieving over Millet's "death". The Widow talks to Marie alone, while the other two wait with Leroux in another room. Marie tells the Widow that Andre truly loves "her" and "she" should marry him. Andre then arrives and tells the Widow the second she says yes to marriage, the contract is destroyed. Once he is gone, Chicago, Dutchy, and O'Shaughnessy arrive with Millet's casket (which is closed and filled with bricks). The trio are excited by the stir Millet's death has caused: prices are higher than ever and the King of France is even attending the funeral. As they celebrate, Marie comes back and shames them. As Marie and the Widow continue talking, Marie says she will never marry and then the Widow gets an idea.

The Widow reveals the disguise and tells an overjoyed Marie to tell Andre to come at 6:00. Suddenly, O'Shaughnessy comes in panicking. The King of France and other royals have come to view the remains. Chicago is out of ideas for once and Dutchy invites the royals in to view the body. The coffin is opened and they are all repulsed by the terrible smell (Dutchy filled the coffin with limburger cheese in case someone wanted to look). As they leave, the friends celebrate as Lefoux comes back and questions Chicago. He sees through the disguise and tells "Lefoux" that he is in love with Cecile. The two embrace and go off into another room where Chicago explains everything. Just before Andre arrives, the Widow takes Dutchy and O'Shaughnessy into another room and tells them the Widow's plan. Alone, Andre reveals he lied to Marie and only wants to marry the widow for her money. Knowing he is in the room, the trio stage a conversation and actions that make it seem as though the Widow has ceramic body parts and false hair. Andre, disgusted, tears up the contract and runs off as the Widow chases him. Dutchy and O'Shaughnessy are left alone with Charlie who reveals that he is actually Inspector Gaston of the Paris Police. He brings everyone except the Widow and Andre into the room where he exposes Millet's remains as bricks and that Lefoux is actually Cecile (there actually is a real Inspector Lefoux who is on vacation). Leroux reveals that instead of the Widow, he will marry either Bathilde or Caron. Gaston is about to send everyone to prison when Millet comes into the room dressed in his normal clothes. He tells Gaston that he was at the Barbary Coast on a break and came back to find his funeral going on. When Gaston tells him his sister stated he was dead, Millet tells him he has no sister. Everyone is overjoyed at Millet's return and Gaston leaves to find "the Widow". Millet and Marie are reunited and will be wed, along with Leroux and one of the ladies and Cecile and Chicago. Chicago reminds Millet that the entire country thinks he is dead, but Millet assured him that France will not admit she was wrong and that now he is a celebrity. Millet proposes a toast to the groups benefactor: the Widow Daisy Tillou.

== World premiere ==
Adapted by David Ives, a former Guggenheim Foundation Fellow in playwriting, and directed by Michael Blakemore, Is He Dead? had its world premiere at the Lyceum Theatre. Martin Pakledinaz designed costumes. The Broadway production began previews on November 8 and was set to open on November 29, 2007, but due to the 2007 Broadway stagehand strike, it was postponed to December 9, 2007.

It received favorable reviews in The New York Times and Variety, but closed on March 9, 2008, after 105 performances.

=== Cast ===
- Norbert Leo Butz as Jean-François Millet/Widow Daisy Tillou
- Byron Jennings as Bastien Andre, art dealer and moneylender
- Jennifer Gambatese as Marie Leroux, Millet's girlfriend
- John McMartin as Papa Louis Leroux, Marie's father
- Bridget Regan as Cecile Leroux, Marie's sister
- Tom Alan Robbins as Hans von Bismarck ("Dutchy"), Millet's friend
- Jeremy Bobb as Phelim O'Shaughnessy, Millet's friend
- Michael McGrath as Agamemnon Buckner ("Chicago"), Millet's friend
- Marylouise Burke as Madame Caron, Millet's landlady
- Patricia Conolly as Madame Bathilde, Millet's landlady
- David Pittu as Basil Thorpe/Claude Rivière/Charlie/The King of France, several small comedic roles
