= Words, Words, Words =

One-act play by David Ives

Words, Words, Words is a one-act play written by David Ives for his collection of six one-act plays, All in the Timing. The play is about Kafka, Milton, and Swift, three intelligent chimpanzees who are put in a cage together under the experimenting eye of a never seen Dr. Rosenbaum, a scientist testing the hypothesis that three apes hitting keys at random on typewriters for an infinite amount of time will almost surely produce Shakespeare's play Hamlet (a variation on the infinite monkey theorem). The show's title is a phrase quoted from Hamlet. The performance comprises the ape characters humorously confronting and conversing with each other in order to understand the purpose of the exercise put upon them.

Although clearly a comedy, the ending tone of the play can differ much from production to production, and generally will depend on the actor's (and director's) interpretation of the Swift character. Swift drives the action, with his rebellion to Dr. Rosenbaum and his experiment, with Milton acting as either a friend or antagonist trying to convince Swift to go along with and use the system. (Swift: "Why are you so god-damned ready to justify the ways of Rosenbaum to the apes?") The portrayal of Swift is always different, but generally falls into either tragic or comic territory. If Swift's plans for revenge are portrayed comically, then they point out the folly of Hamlet's plan to ensnare the King, deepening the parody of Shakespeare's most celebrated work. If performed dramatically, the play leaves Swift as the tragic hero, a Cassandra figure unappreciated by his colleagues, going mad in captivity. In either case, Kafka ends the play on a notion of hope, as she is the one who spontaneously begins to successfully type the opening lines of Hamlet, comically juxtaposed against Swift who merely ponders in silence and Milton who aimlessly types the words "hemorrhoid", "pomegranate", and "bazooka".

== Characters ==
- Milton is the most realistic of the three; he knows what has to be done and knows how to do it. The rough draft on his typewriter involves the opening lines from Paradise Lost (written by John Milton in 1667), though it concludes with nonsensical words.
- Swift (also called "Swifty") is ambitious and something of a rebel. He figures out far-fetched plans to break out of the cage, despite Milton's sarcastic and annoyed discouragement. He is the most philosophical, though his writing reflects only utter nonsense.
- Kafka (also called "Franz") is the dreamer. She has only managed to press one button on her typewriter repeatedly, and has done so for twenty lines. She likes to put her two cents in, but rarely uses very big words. Kafka plays the naïf (and is the only female of the trio), agreeing that the experiment is stupid, but hoping for a great reward if she succeeds. By the end of the play, she begins to type the first act of Hamlet after being inspired by Swift's suggestion to poison Dr. Rosenbaum.

== Productions ==
Words, Words, Words premiered in January 1987, in the Manhattan Punch Line Theatre in New York City. It starred Warren Keith as Milton, Christopher Fields as Swift, and Helen Greenberg as Kafka.

It was combined with other plays such as Sure Thing and Philip Glass Buys a Loaf of Bread in a production of six one-act plays, comprising All in the Timing, Off-Broadway at Primary Stages, running from November 1993 to February 1994. Daniel Hagen played the role of Milton, Robert Stanton played Swift, and Nancy Opel played Kafka.

All in the Timing was revived at Primary Stages in 2013.

Along with Sure Thing and The Philadelphia, Words, Words, Words is one of the one-acts which is almost always included in productions of All in the Timing. (Recent printings of All in the Timing include upwards of twenty separate plays.)
