= Monsieur Eek =

2001 novel by David Ives

Monsieur Eek is a short novel by American playwright David Ives, intended for ages 9–12. It was first published September 1, 2001 by HarperCollins. Set in 1609, it is about a chimpanzee who gets arrested for being a French spy. The book is based on a real law in medieval times that allowed animals to be convicted of crimes.

== Plot summary ==
When a chimpanzee arrives in the tiny coastal city MacOongafoondsen during the Napoleonic Wars he is taken for a Frenchman. Arousing insular prejudice, he is put on trial on suspicion of being a French spy and the thief responsible for a string of local burglaries. He is defended by 13-year-old Emmaline Perth with the help of Flurp, the town fool. Eek ends up being found guilty. However, he is rescued and not hanged. MacOongsafooden's population starts to rapidly rise.

== See also ==
- Animal trial
