= All in the Timing =

Collection of one-act plays by David Ives

All in the Timing is a collection of one-act plays by the American playwright David Ives, written between 1987 and 1993. It had its premiere Off-Broadway in 1993 at Primary Stages, and was revived at Primary Stages in 2013. It was first published by Dramatists Play Service in 1994, with a collection of six plays; however, the updated collection contains fourteen. The short plays are almost all comedies (or comedy dramas), focusing mainly on language and wordplay, existentialist perspectives on life and meaning, as well as the complications involved in romantic relationships. High-school and college students frequently perform the plays, often due to their brevity and undemanding staging requirements.

== Original six plays ==
- Sure Thing: A man and a woman meet for the first time in a cafe, where they have an awkward meeting continually reset each time they say the wrong thing, until, finally, they romantically connect.
- Words, Words, Words: Three chimpanzees, named after famous authors and expected to write Hamlet, for the most part waste time engaging in pointless banter, while occasionally inspired to make grandiose literary allusions.
- The Universal Language: A man welcomes a naïve woman into his fraudulent language-learning course, in which he only speaks the invented language Unamunda; however, he confesses to the deception as he begins to fall in love with her.
- Philip Glass Buys a Loaf of Bread: A musical parody of minimalist composer Philip Glass.
- The Philadelphia: At a restaurant, a man is informed by a friend that his frustratingly unlucky day is the result of his ensnarement in an anomalous pocket of reality, called a "Philadelphia," in which he will only be fulfilled by asking for the opposites of what he wants. By the end, the man begins to feel content at last, only for his friend to be pulled also into the Philadelphia, while the waitress groans of her own entanglement in a "Cleveland."
- Variations on the Death of Trotsky: In comic fashion, revolutionary Leon Trotsky dies over and over again from a mountain-climber's axe-wound received many hours prior. Ultimately, Trotsky talks directly to his assassin who, while posing as a gardener, actually helped make some flowers in the garden grow. This sparks Trotsky to make his final philosophical statements on human life before he dies a final time.

== Other plays ==
- Long Ago and Far Away: A married yuppie couple, about to move out of their apartment, argues about the nature of reality and becomes caught up in a bizarre scenario concluding in time travel and suicide; this is one of the few purely dramatic pieces in All in the Timing.
- Foreplay, or The Art of the Fugue: Three miniature golf games taking place simultaneously, showing one man on three separate first dates.
- Seven Menus: Seven dinners at the same restaurant, showing the evolution of one circle of friends.
- Mere Mortals: Three blue-collar construction workers discuss how they are really the Lindbergh baby, the son of Czar Nicholas II of Russia, and the reincarnation of Marie Antoinette.
- English Made Simple: A young man and woman meet at a party and their immediate romantic attraction is presented via loudspeaker by a comically unromantic grammar lesson, while they struggle to free themselves from the banal constrictions of party talk.
- A Singular Kinda Guy: A monologue about a man who believes he is actually a typewriter.
- Speed-the-Play: A parody of the works of American playwright David Mamet; his major works are each lampooned.
- Ancient History: A couple discusses tradition and relationships before and after they hold a party; one of the few dramatic works in All in the Timing.

== Critical response ==
The reviewer of the 2013 revival wrote: "...two decades later, these carefully constructed sketches, which highlight Ives' fascination with language, are still to be savored. Even when they occasionally miss their mark or wear out their welcome, the skits put most of the recent writing of Saturday Night Live to shame.... you don't have to be a great intellectual to fully appreciate any of the show's pieces. Certainly not the delicious opener, 'Sure Thing,' in which two strangers (Elrod and Rooth) replay their first meeting in a café with dozens of small changes until a romantic connection is forged..."
