= James McLure =

American dramatist

James Miller McLure Jr. (August 5, 1951 – February 17, 2011) was an American playwright. He was born in Alexandria, Louisiana and grew up in Shreveport where he was educated by the Jesuits. He became interested in acting in high school, performing in Shakespearean plays. He obtained a BFA degree from Southern Methodist University in Dallas, Texas, and subsequently studied at the Pacific Conservatory of the Performing Arts in Santa Maria, California. While studying at SMU his roommate was actor and friend Stephen Tobolowsky, who frequently recalls stories involving McLure in his podcast.

He moved to New York City in 1975 and was a member of the Lion Theatre Company. His plays Lone Star and Pvt. Wars were presented off-Broadway in 1979 after having been presented at the Humana Festival at the Actors Theatre of Louisville. In 1980, Lone Star and Laundry and Bourbon were shown together as 1959 Pink Thunderbird at the McCarter Theatre. His subsequent plays include: Thanksgiving, The Day They Shot John Lennon, The River Cane, and an adaptation of John O'Keeffe's 18th-century comedy Wild Oats (moving it to the Old West), which was produced as an official entry for the 1984 Olympics Arts Festival. He was also a part of the Biennial Festival of New American Plays at Stephen F. Austin State University. The latest play he presented there was Seduction, a play about the inner workings of a stage production. "Pvt. Wars" made its London premiere at the Greenwich Studio Theatre on September 1, 1991, with Billy Lomas (Natwick), Dorian Lough (Silvio), and Pancho Russell (Gately).

For many years McLure was a participant playwright in The Missoula Colony, a writers workshop of the Montana Repertory Theatre, and the only playwright to contribute to the Colony in every year of its existence.

In 1992, his play Max and Maxie was presented at the Denver Center Theatre, followed by Fran and Brian (1993), Ghost World (1993), The Agent (1993), and Southern Christmas (1995). His play The Day They Shot John Lennon was presented in 2011 at the Carolina Actors Studio Theatre in Charlotte. His last play, Iago, developed at the Playwright's Project in Healing Springs, North Carolina and the Alabama Shakespeare Festival, was presented at the New Jersey Repertory Company in 2016, winning the Best Actress in a Play award from Broadway World, calling it "a true theatrical masterpiece".

In addition to his work in the theatre, McLure wrote for the screen and television including Sangre starring Holly Hunter and Reckless starring Aidan Quinn.

He died at home in Marina del Rey, California, February 17, 2011, of cancer. He was survived by his sister, Jenny McLure Schroeder.
