= The Universal Language =

One-act play by David Ives

The Universal Language is a short comedic play written by David Ives. The play is part of the collection of plays called All in the Timing. The show features two characters, Don and Dawn. Don is a con artist trying to swindle customers into learning a fraudulent language, Unamunda, and Dawn is a shy 28-year-old woman with a stutter. Through the course of the play, Don and Dawn learn about each other and themselves, and fall in love.

== Plot synopsis ==
Dawn di Vito wanders into an office, hoping to learn Unamunda, an Esperanto-like language. Don Finninneganegan, the inventor of the language, appears suddenly, speaking rapidly in the made-up language. Dawn becomes confused, thinking she has the wrong address. Don manages to reassure her that she is in the right place, despite the language barrier. Dawn quickly becomes fascinated by Unamunda, and agrees to pay $500 to learn the language. Soon, Dawn is as fluent as Don, and she notices that the stutter she once had is gone. She vows to speak only Unamunda, but Don seems upset by this development. When Dawn tries to pay for the lesson, Don stops her and reveals his intention: to con people out of their money by teaching them a fraudulent language. He doesn't want anyone to laugh at her for learning the language, and tries to convince her to stop speaking Unamunda. She refuses, telling Don that the language is more than just a method of communication; it is also a bond of love shared between the two of them. Don realizes that he loves Dawn and gives in. The two share a kiss, and as they are about to kiss again, a man knocks at the office door, asking if he is at the School of Unamunda. The new couple welcome in the next student.

== Productions ==
The Universal Language premiered Off-Broadway at the Primary Stages in 1993, as part of the short one-act plays of All in the Timing. Dawn was played by Wendy Lawless and Don was played by Robert Stanton. The play was directed by Jason McConnell Buzas. All in the Timing was revived in 2013 at Primary Stages, including The Universal Language.

== Unamunda ==
Unamunda itself is based on words in the English language, as well as German, Russian, and the Romance languages. Many of the words in Unamunda are false cognates. For example, the word for "people" in Unamunda is "peephole" and the word for "carry" is "cargo." A full translation of all the words can be found here.

== See also ==
- Esperanto
