= Visiting Mr. Green =

Play written by Jeff Baron

- Written by: Jeff Baron
- Characters: Ross Gardiner; Mr. Green

Premiere
- Date: June 20, 1996
- Place: Berkshire Theatre Festival; Stockbridge, Massachusetts

Visiting Mr. Green is a stage play by American author Jeff Baron that has been performed around the world.

== Storyline ==
Eighty-six-year-old widower Mr. Green is almost hit by a car driven by young corporate executive Ross Gardiner. Found guilty of reckless driving, Ross is ordered to spend the next six months making weekly visits to Mr. Green. What starts off as a comedy about two people who resent being in the same room together develops into drama, as family secrets are revealed and old wounds are opened.

== History ==
On June 20, 1996 the play had its premiere at the Berkshire Theatre Festival in Stockbridge, Massachusetts, with Eli Wallach in the lead role; the production played at the Berkshire through July 6. From 1997 it played a year-long run at the Union Square Theatre in New York, again with Wallach in the lead role.

It was nominated for an ACE award (Buenos Aires), a Molière (Paris) and a Drama League Award (New York). It also won Best Play awards in Greece, Mexico, Israel, Uruguay, Turkey and Germany, and the Kulturpreis Europa. His newer plays have originated in Australia, South America and Europe.

The play has gone on to have over 500 productions in 49 countries and has been translated into 23 languages.

So This Is My Family - Mr. Green Part 2, Jeff Baron's sequel to Visiting Mr. Green, had its world premiere at the Avignon Theatre Festival in France in July, 2018. Set three years after the original play, with two additional characters, the play will open in The Netherlands in 2020.

The United Nations presented a reading from the play by Eli Wallach in 1999.

== Awards ==
- Drama League (NYC), Best Play nominee;
- Greek Theatre Awards, Best Play;
- Molière Awards (PARIS), Best Play nominee;
- Turkish Theatre Awards, Best Play;
- Israeli Theatre Awards, Best Play;
- Mexico Theatre Awards, Best Play;
- INTHEGA Prize (Germany), Best Touring Play;
- A.C.E. (Argentina), Best Foreign Play nominee;
- Kulturpreis Europa, 2001;
- Florencio Award (Uruguay), Best Foreign Play.
