= Jeff Baron =

American dramatist

- Occupation: Novelist/playwright/screenwriter
- Website: www.jeffbaron.net

Jeff Baron is an American novelist, playwright and screenwriter currently living in Manhattan. He is the author of I Represent Sean Rosen and Sean Rosen Is Not for Sale, published by Greenwillow/HarperCollins and the Electro-Pup series, which he developed via visits to elementary schools around the U.S. He has written for prime-time series on all the major TV networks, and his play Visiting Mr. Green has been produced in 50 countries. Baron's plays have been said to focus primarily on family relationships and conflicts, friendship, romance, and the need for human connection. He was awarded the KulturPreis Europa.

== Early life ==
Baron grew up in suburban New Jersey and later earned a film degree from Northwestern University and an M.B.A. from Harvard Business School. He spent several years working in the corporate world before transitioning to a life in the arts.

== Work ==
=== Theatre ===
Visiting Mr. Green, Jeff Baron's best-known play, starred Eli Wallach and ran for a year at Manhattan's Union Square Theatre. It was nominated for an ACE award (Buenos Aires), a Molière (Paris) and a Drama League Award (New York). It also won Best Play awards in Greece, Mexico, Israel, Uruguay, Turkey and Germany, and the Kulturpreis Europa. His newer plays have originated in Australia, South America and Europe. So This Is My Family – Mr. Green Part 2, Baron's sequel to Visiting Mr. Green, had its world premiere at the Avignon Theatre Festival in 2018. When I Was Five (Cuando Tenía Cinco Años) had its world premiere in 2013 at Teatro de Lucía in Lima, Peru. Brothers-in-Law had its first production in 2008 at Act II Playhouse outside of Philadelphia. Jeff received a TCG/ITI Grant to workshop his play Mr. & Mrs. God with Planet Art, a Croatian theatre company. Mother's Day, was produced in Australia (Ensemble Theatre, Sydney), Germany (Schauspielhaus Wuppertal) and Brazil (Teatro FAAP – São Paulo) His one act play, Give 'em an Inch, was commissioned and produced in Los Angeles. What Goes Around... is a series of comic plays that opened in New York in August 2006. As the Author-in-Residence at Ardsley (NY) Middle School, Jeff Baron has mentored the entire seventh grade each year since 2013 in an original play writing program.

=== Fiction ===
In 2013, Greenwillow/HarperCollins published Baron's first novel, I Represent Sean Rosen. Sean Rosen, the first-person narrator, is a thirteen-year-old aspiring writer/screenwriter and idea man. He has come up with a concept that will revolutionize the entertainment industry. Unfortunately, he can't get it sold because he needs an agent or a manager. Since nobody wants to represent a 13-year-old boy, he moves to plan B: he invents Dan Welch to represent him. Sean is entrepreneurial in a variety of ways, one of which is that he creates podcasts on varying themes from donuts to hair for which he interviews people. He tells us about these in the novel and readers can see and hear them at www.SeanRosen.com The second book in the series Sean Rosen Is Not for Sale was published in 2014. Electro-Pup, a comedy-adventure about 11-year old Luke and his mind-reading dog Mojo, was developed by trying out chapters and discussing the story and characters with 2,000 second through fifth graders and their teachers and school librarians at 11 schools in five states.

=== Film and TV ===
Jeff Baron has written episodes for American television series including The Tracey Ullman Show, Almost Grown, Sisters, A Year in the Life, Aaron's Way and The Disney Sunday Movie. He also wrote and produced several projects for Nickelodeon. His film The Bruce Diet won the CINE Golden Eagle award and was featured at film festivals around the world. His original screenplays were optioned by Marcia Nasatir, David Brown and Disney.

=== Other works ===
Jeff directed his commissioned one-act opera, Song of Martina, at Carnegie Hall. He was commissioned by the Los Angeles Opera, through a grant from the National Endowment for the Arts, to write the libretto of a one-act opera, Escape.

== Plays ==
- So This Is My Family – Mr. Green Part 2 (2018)
- When I Was Five (2013)
- Mr. & Mrs. God (2009)
- What Goes Around... (2006)
- Brothers-in-Law (2005)
- Bless Me, Father (2002)
- Mother's Day (2000)
- Visiting Mr. Green (1996)
- Give 'em an Inch (1996)

== Books ==
- I Represent Sean Rosen
- Sean Rosen Is Not for Sale
- Electro-Pup

== Short films ==
- Goodbye (2008)
- The Bruce Diet (1992)
