= Flash drama =

Flash drama is a type of theatrical play that does not exceed ten minutes in duration, hence the name. Groups of four to six flash drama plays are popular with school, university and community drama companies since they offer a wide variety of roles and situations in a single performance.

There are no set rules for flash plays but the typical play has certain characteristics, such as:

- Consisting of one act
- Utilising one to three characters
- Simple, if any, set design
