= Philip Glass Buys a Loaf of Bread =

One-act play by David Ives

Philip Glass Buys a Loaf of Bread is a one-act play by David Ives, published as part of his 1994 All In The Timing collection.

== Production history ==
The play was first produced at the Manhattan Punch Line Theatre in New York City, January 1990. It was next performed as part of six short plays, collectively titled All in the Timing Off-Broadway at Primary Stages in 1993, and revived in 2013. Ives described the play: "Each one of these little plays were a little education in some particular aspect of theatre.... 'Philip Glass Buys a Loaf of Bread' — how much of a musical you can write in six minutes without having an orchestra."

The Time Out New York reviewer, in his review of the 2013 revival, wrote: "...the bravura piece of music-theater parody, Philip Glass Buys a Loaf of Bread. The latter lampoon, whose content is pretty much summed up in the title, gives Ives a chance to use a few banal pieces of dialogue to imitate the composer’s minimalist arpeggios..."

== Overview ==
The short play imitates composer Philip Glass's minimalist style; that is to say that comparatively few words and ideas are repeated many times throughout the work. The structure of this piece is closest to a hip hop or musical number, but it is quite distinct from both. The beat is alternately very fast and very ponderous. Einstein on the Beach, the 5-hour Glassian opera, is said by some to provide a good model of such rhythms that are seen in the play.

The play opens and closes completely normally—"Philip Glass" enters a bakery, where in passing he encounters an old love of his accompanied by a friend.

Between the two ends of this scene, in a long section marked by the ringing of a bell (a recurring device in Ives' plays), come rhythmic reorderings of the words used in the opening and closing. Some of the phrases make little sense ("PHILIP CAN THINK BREAD"), but they are used to create an emotional atmosphere suggesting Philip's subconscious state at seeing this woman again. Other lines are understandable but absurd, such as "PHILIP GLASS IS A LOAF OF BREAD" and "PHILIP NEED A LOAF OF LOVE," while others still make philosophical sense, such as "TIME IS A MOMENT."

The play suggests several themes (although none of them too seriously) including the tendency of real life (the Baker) to interrupt what we wish life to be (Philip Glass and his old love). It seems that whenever Philip Glass or the rest of the cast comes close to a philosophical revelation, they revert to trochaic, nonsensical rhythms such as "Go! Go! Go! Go! Time! Time! Time! Time!" The bread can also be seen as a symbol of Philip's life and happiness, which he tries to ask for several times in vain. The Baker also needs "bread" in his life, whatever that may be for him... even money ("bread"). None of the messages are to be taken entirely seriously, as noted in the original "sheet music" of the piece.

Philip Glass... may be distinguished from most of Ives' other works in that its ending may be played either comedically or dramatically, depending on the production. Of all of Ives' works, it is certainly the most open to directors' interpretation and thus stagings of it vary wildly. While some productions might choose to increase the absurdity of the parody until climactic breaking point, others may choose to twist the rhythm towards the end to allow for the few dramatic revelations allowed in the piece, such as "WHAT'S THE WOMAN MATTER?" and the final line of the musical interlude, "NEED NOTHING NEED WOMAN NEED MATTER. NO CHANGE." Nevertheless, the piece almost invariably ends on a laugh, as Glass asks if the baker can break his bill and the baker points to a sign stating, "No Change." (In some productions, there is no sign, and this is merely implied or else spoken outright.)
