= Sure Thing (play) =

One-act comedy by David Ives

Sure Thing is a short comic play by David Ives featuring a chance meeting of two characters, Betty and Bill, whose conversation is continually reset by the use of a ringing bell, starting over when one of them responds negatively to the other. The play was first produced in 1988, and was published in 1994.

== Synopsis ==
The play begins with Bill approaching Betty in a café, asking "Is this chair taken?" To which she replies "Yes." The bell rings and Bill repeats his question to which Betty says, "No, but I'm expecting somebody in a minute." The bell rings again, and Bill poses his question again. This process continues until Bill is finally allowed to take a seat. The bell acts as a buffer against all topics of conversation that are potentially negative to building their relationship, allowing them to try another line. By the end of the play, their initial differences in opinion (i.e. literature, movie tastes, romance) have reversed to become perfect companions. Both of them finally agree to fall in love and cherish the other forever.

Ives takes away any words or beliefs that could be offensive, whether they be sexist remarks or political affiliations. As with Bill's line:

“I believe a man is what he is. (Bell) A person is what he is. (Bell) A person is ... what they are.”

As Martin Andrucki (Professor of Theater, Bates College) wrote: "In effect words create, and re-create, his [Bill] future as he goes along. Thus, language itself takes on the power to determine the lives of Bill and Betty."

== Productions ==
Sure Thing was first presented at Manhattan Punch Line's Festival of One-Act Comedies, New York City, in February 1988. The director was Jason McConnell Buzas. The characters of Bill and Betty were played by Robert Stanton and Nancy Opel, respectively.

Sure Thing was part of Ives’ original six-play collection, All in the Timing, which premiered Off-Broadway in 1993 at Primary Stages, and was revived at Primary Stages in 2013. Ives won the Outer Critics Circle John Gassner Award for Playwriting, 1993-1994.
