= David Ives =

American playwright (born 1950)

- Born: July 11, 1950 (age 76); Chicago, Illinois, U.S.
- Education: Northwestern University (BA); Yale University (MFA)
- Occupations: Playwright, screenwriter, author
- Spouse: Martha Ives
- Writing career
- Period: 1972–present

David Ives (born David Roszkowski July 11, 1950) is an American playwright, screenwriter, and novelist. He is perhaps best known for his comic one-act plays; The New York Times in 1997 referred to him as the "maestro of the short form". Ives has also written dramatic plays, narrative stories, and screenplays, has adapted French 17th and 18th-century classical comedies, and adapted 33 musicals for New York City's Encores! series.

== Early life and education ==
Ives wrote his first play when he was nine. He attended a boys Catholic seminary. "We would-be priests were groomed for gravitas," he has said. At the end of the year the seniors could be a part of a school show called "The Senior Mock," in which the students satirized the teachers. Ives played the role of "the chain-smoking English teacher who coached the track team (while smoking)", and he wrote and performed a song. This school experience, along with seeing a production of Edward Albee’s A Delicate Balance, starring Hume Cronyn and Jessica Tandy, were two early events that inspired his interest in theatre.

Ives attended Northwestern University, majoring in English. He graduated with a Bachelor of Arts degree in 1971. He traveled to Germany, where he taught English. Ives graduated from the Yale School of Drama with a Master of Fine Arts in 1984.

== Theater ==
His play, Canvas, was produced in California in 1972, and then at Circle Repertory Company in New York City. In New York Ives worked as an editor for William P. Bundy, the editor at Foreign Affairs magazine. Ives wrote three full-length plays: St. Freud (1975), The Lives and Deaths of the Great Harry Houdini, and City of God. In 1983 Ives was playwright-in-residence at the Williamstown Theatre Festival in Massachusetts where The Lives and Deaths of the Great Harry Houdini was produced.

In 1987 his short play Words, Words, Words was presented at the Manhattan Punch Line Theatre, followed by Sure Thing, Variations on the Death of Trotsky, Philip Glass Buys a Loaf of Bread (1990), and The Universal Language. A two-act play, Ancient History was produced Off-Broadway in 1989 by Primary Stages.

Ives' All in the Timing, an evening of six one-act plays, premiered at Primary Stages in 1993, moved to the larger John Houseman Theatre, and ran for 606 performances. In a review The New York Times said "there is indeed a real heart ... There is sustenance as well as pure entertainment." Critic Vincent Canby wrote, "Ives [is] wizardly ... magical and funny ... a master of language. He uses words for their meanings, sounds and associations, spinning conceits of a sort I’ve not seen or heard before. He’s an original." It won the Outer Critics Circle John Gassner Award for Playwriting, was included in Best Plays of 1993 — 1994, and in 1995 — 1996 was the most performed play in the country after William Shakespeare’s plays.

Ives’ full-length play Don Juan in Chicago premiered off-Broadway in New York at Primary Stages, on March 25, 1995. The Red Address, a full-length drama, premiered in New York at Second Stage Theater in January 1997.

An evening of one-act plays, Mere Mortals and Others, opened off-Broadway at Primary Stages in New York, May 13, 1997. Peter Marks of The New York Times described it as "a collection of six fast and ferociously funny comedies ... a madcap evening of one-acts", and noted that Ives has the "gratifying ability to unharness the intoxicating power of language and at the same time entertain."

Polish Joke, a full-length play, has been described as loosely autobiographical. It premiered in the summer of 2001 at the Contemporary Theatre of Seattle, and then opened in New York at the Manhattan Theatre Club in February 2003, in the cast in New York was Walter Bobbie, who would later be the director of Venus in Fur.

The Blizzard is a short play that was written as part of a theatrical concept that began in 1995 on the lower East Side of Manhattan, in which a group of writers, actors and directors would gather together to create a play from scratch, rehearse it, and perform it — all within 24 hours. The Blizzard, and eight of Ives' other short plays, was produced on the radio by Playing On Air, directed by John Rando and starred Jesse Eisenberg.

Primary Stages presented a revival of All in the Timing in January 2013. This new production was directed by John Rando.

His plays have been published in the anthologies All in the Timing, Time Flies, and Polish Joke And Other Plays.

In the mid-1990s, Ives contributed pieces to Spy Magazine, The New York Times Magazine, and The New Yorker. New York magazine named him one of the "100 Smartest New Yorkers". When asked by the magazine to comment on being so listed for the same issue, Ives’ response began, "Grocery lists. Spelling lists. Laundry lists. The very idea of lists has something inherently narrow, petty, unpoetic about it. "List, list, O list!" cried Hamlet’s father's ghost in exasperation, and I couldn't agree more ..."

His translation of Georges Feydeau's farce A Flea in Her Ear was produced at Chicago Shakespeare in 2006, and won the Joseph Jefferson Award for "new adaptation". His play, Is He Dead? adapted from an "unproduced 1898 comedy" by Mark Twain, ran on Broadway from December 2007 to March 2008. New Jerusalem, concerning the excommunication of Baruch Spinoza, opened Off-Broadway in January 2008 (previews from December 2007) in a Classic Stage Company production. New Jerusalem won a Hull-Warriner Award.

In 2010, he adapted Pierre Corneille's comedy The Liar for The Shakespeare Theatre Company in Washington, D.C. It won the Charles MacArthur Award for Outstanding New Play at the Helen Hayes Awards in Washington the following year. In 2011 his version of Molière’s The Misanthrope premiered Off-Broadway at Classic Stage Company under the title, The School For Lies. Also in 2011 his adaptation of Jean-Francois Regnard’s Le Legataire universel premiered at the Shakespeare Theatre Company in Washington, D.C. under the title, The Heir Apparent. The Heir Apparent opened Off-Broadway in March 2014 (previews) at the Classic Stage Company, and ran through May 2014.

Venus in Fur opened Off-Broadway at the Classic Stage Company in January 2010 with Nina Arianda and Wes Bentley. Venus in Fur premiered on Broadway in October 2011 (previews) at the Samuel J. Friedman Theatre, produced by the Manhattan Theatre Club. Nina Arianda returned to the role she created Off-Broadway and Hugh Dancy played the role originated by Bentley. Walter Bobbie once again directed. The play transferred to the Lyceum Theatre in February 2012 for an extended run with Arianda and Dancy reprising their performances.

All in the Timing was, after Shakespeare plays, the most produced play in the United States during the 1995–1996 season, and Venus in Fur was most produced, after Shakespeare plays, during the 2013–2014 season.

His Lives of the Saints began in previews Off-Broadway at Primary Stages in February 2015, running through March 27, 2015. Directed by John Rando, Lives of the Saints consists of seven short plays. The plays are: Enigma Variations, The Mystery at Twicknam Vicarage, Babel's in Arms, Soap Opera, Lives of the Saints, Arabian Nights, and Captive Audience. Several of the plays had been produced previously. The Lives of the Saints was produced with five of the plays at the Berkshire Theatre Festival, Stockbridge, Massachusetts in August and September 1999.

His play, The Liar, based on a 17th-century play by Pierre Corneille opened at the Classic Stage Company in New York January 26, 2017.

He has continued to base plays on 17th century French plays: in 2017, The School for Lies, based on Moliere's play The Misanthrope, opened at the Lansburgh Theatre in Washington, DC.

In April 2018, Red Bull Theater presented the New York premiere The Metromaniacs, his "translaptation" of a rediscovered French farce by Alexis Piron at The Duke on 42nd Street directed by Michael Kahn.

== Musical theatre ==
In the early 1990s Ives started working in musical theatre, writing the libretto for an opera based on Frances Hodgson Burnett's The Secret Garden (music by Greg Pliska). It premiered in Philadelphia in 1991 at the Pennsylvania Opera Theater.

He then became a regular adapter for the New York City Center Encores! series of American musicals in concert, starting with Out Of This World in 1995, Du Barry Was A Lady in 1996, and working on two or three a year until 2012. As of 2013, Ives ended his writing for Encores!, saying "I've very happily done 33 adaptations for Encores! But there comes a time when it's time for someone else to have that pleasure, especially given how full my platter is these days." His Encores! adaptation of Wonderful Town moved to Broadway's Al Hirschfeld Theatre in 2003, directed by Kathleen Marshall.

He adapted David Copperfield's magic show, Dreams and Nightmares, which premiered on Broadway at the Martin Beck Theatre in December 1996. He also adapted Cole Porter's Jubilee (1998) and Rodgers and Hammerstein's South Pacific (with Reba McEntire) for concert performances at Carnegie Hall, as well as My Fair Lady for a staged concert at Avery Fisher Hall in New York in 2007.

He helped to rework the book for the Broadway version of the musical Dance of the Vampires, with book, music and lyrics by Jim Steinman and original German book and lyrics by Michael Kunze. The musical opened on Broadway in October 2002 in previews, and closed in January 2003 after 56 performances. He co-wrote the book for Irving Berlin's White Christmas, which premiered in San Francisco in 2004 and then went on to tour across the United States. It had a limited engagement on Broadway from November 2008 to January 2009, and also from November 2009 to January 2010.

Ives began collaborating with Stephen Sondheim on a new untitled musical based on two films by Luis Buñuel, initially set to premiere in 2017. Development on the show faltered, but during a September 15, 2021 appearance on The Late Show with Stephen Colbert, Sondheim announced he was working on a new musical called Square One in collaboration with David Ives. Nathan Lane and Bernadette Peters were involved in a reading of the new work. Renamed as Here We Are, the musical collaboration inspired by The Discreet Charm of the Bourgeoisie and The Exterminating Angel would have a limited engagement world premiere in September 2023, running through January 2024 at The Shed.

== Narrative fiction ==
Ives wrote The Phobia Clinic, a full-length narrative verse-novel published in 2010. It is described as a philosophical horror novel written in verse. It is, according to the author, "grotesque, satirical, personal, sometimes funny, but mostly reflecting the mood of the title." Inspired by Dante, The Phobia Clinic employs the verse form of the Divine Comedy, known as terza rima, with the lines grouped in threes, and each group, or tercet, following the rhyme scheme ABA BCB CDC DED throughout Ives' 55 cantos.

Ives wrote a young adult book, Monsieur Eek, which was released in 2001. The book is set in 1609, and is a "fairy tale–like story full of absurd characters who make bizarre interpretations ..." His next book was Scrib (2005), set in the American West in 1863. His book Voss: How I Come to America and Am Hero, Mostly, was released in 2008.

== Personal ==
Ives lives in New York City with his wife, Martha Ives, a book illustrator, a linoprint artist and a member of the Society of American Graphic Artists.

== Works ==
=== Plays ===
- 1972 Canvas
- 1975 Saint Freud
- 1976 Boarders
- 1977 The Conversation (Note: Debuted in 1977 at the AMDA Studio Theatre, New York.)
- 1981 Inner Station
- 1982 Dark Horse
- 1983 The Lives and Deaths of the Great Harry Houdini
- 1983 Polly
- 198? City of God (Note: David Ives has been quoted as saying "Mercifully it never got into print" (Source: https://www.nytimes.com/1994/01/04/theater/david-ives-s-quick-hit-approach-to-staging-the-human-comedy.html))
- 1988 The Land of Cockaigne
- 1989 Ancient History (later revised in 1996)
- 1993 All in the Timing (six short plays) (Note: "Sure Thing", "Words, Words, Words", "The Universal Language", "Philip Glass Buys a Loaf of Bread", "The Philadelphia" and "Variations on the Death of Trotsky".)
- 1995 Don Juan In Chicago
- 1997 The Red Address
- 1997 Mere Mortals and Others (six short plays) (Note: "Foreplay, or, The Art of Fugue", "Mere Mortals", "Time Flies", "Speed-the-Play", "Dr. Fritz" and "Degas, C'est Moi".)
- 1999 Lives of the Saints (five short plays) (Note: "Enigma Variations", "The Mystery at Twicknam Vicarage", "Babel's in Arms", "Soap Opera" and "Lives of the Saints".)
- 2003 Polish Joke
- 2005 Roll Over, Beethoven (a short comedy)
- 2008 New Jerusalem (The Interrogation of Baruch de Spinoza at Talmud Torah Congregation: Amsterdam, July 27, 1656)
- 2010 Venus In Fur
- 2018 The Panties, The Partner, and the One Percent: Scenes from the Heroic Life of the Middle Class (inspired by the work of Carl Sternheim)
- 202? The Transformations
- 202? True to Life
- 2024 Pamela Palmer

=== Operas ===
- 1987 The Universal Language (Note: Presented by The Pennsylvania Opera Theatre.)
- 1987 Pitcher Perfect (Unfinished, music by Catherine Reid) (Note: Commissioned by The Indianapolis Opera.)
- 1991 The Secret Garden (libretto of an opera based on Frances Hodgson Burnett’s The Secret Garden, with music by Greg Pliska)

=== Musicals ===
- 1997 Make Someone Happy (co-written with Phyllis Newman)
- 2002 Dance of the Vampires (co-author of the revised 2002 Broadway production)
- 2004 Irving Berlin's White Christmas (co-authored with Paul Blake)
- 2023 Here We Are (music and lyrics by Stephen Sondheim)

=== Translations ===
- 2006 Georges Feydeau's farce A Flea In Her Ear
- 2007 Yasmina Reza's play A Spanish Play

=== Adaptations ===
Note: David Ives also helped mount 33 Encores! Series adaptations between 1995-2013.

- 1996 Dreams and Nightmares (adapted from David Copperfield's magic show)
- 2007 Is He Dead? (adapted from an unproduced 1898 comedy by Mark Twain)
- 2010 The Liar (adapted from Pierre Corneille's comedy Le Menteur)
- 2011 The School for Lies (adapted from Molière's The Misanthrope)
- 2011 The Heir Apparent (adapted from Jean-Francois Regnard's Le Legataire Universel)
- 2018 The Metromaniacs (a "translaptation" of a rediscovered French farce by Alexis Piron titled La Métromanie)

=== Screenplays ===
- 1998 The Hunted (co-written with Bennett Cohen, produced for Trilogy Productions and airing on Showtime)
- 2013 La Vénus à la Fourrure (directed by and co-authored with Roman Polanski)

=== Television ===
- 1998 The Pentagon Wars (uncredited rewrites)
- 1998 Remember WENN (Episode 55 – "The Sunset Also Rises")
- 1990 Urban Anxiety (staff writer) (Note: For FOX TV.)

=== Narrative Fiction ===
- 2001 Monsieur Eek
- 2005 Scrib
- 2008 Voss: How I Come to America and Am Hero, Mostly

=== Published Poetry ===
- 2009 The Phobia Clinic (Note: Self-published in 300 copies.)
- 2018 Advice to the Creator (Note: Published in The Hudson Review.)
- 2018 Three Riddles (Note: Published in The Hudson Review.)
- 2023 A Pair of Glasses (Note: Published in The Hudson Review.)

=== Short Play Collections ===
Note: Plays in bold are published here for the very first time. Years listed are the date of their debut.

Four Short Comedies (1989)

- 1988 **Sure Thing**
- 1987 **Words, Words, Words**
- 1989 **Seven Menus**
- 1990 **Mere Mortals**

Variations on the Death of Trotsky and Other Short Comedies (1992)

- 1991 **Foreplay, or, The Art of Fugue** (later revised in 1994)
- 1991 **Variations on the Death of Trotsky**
- 1990 **Philip Glass Buys a Loaf of Bread**
- 1989 **Speed-the-Play** (later revised in 1994)

All In the Timing: Six One-Act Comedies (1994)

- 1988 Sure Thing
- 1987 Words, Words, Words
- 1993 **The Universal Language**
- 1990 Philip Glass Buys a Loaf of Bread
- 1992 **The Philadelphia**
- 1991 Variations on the Death of Trotsky

All In the Timing: Fourteen Plays (1995)

- 1988 Sure Thing
- 1987 Words, Words, Words
- 1993 The Universal Language
- 1990 Philip Glass Buys a Loaf of Bread
- 1992 The Philadelphia
- 1991 Variations on the Death of Trotsky
- 1993 **Long Ago and Far Away** (later revised in 1999)
- 1991 Foreplay, or, The Art of Fugue (later revised in 1994)
- 1989 Seven Menus
- 1990 Mere Mortals
- 1994 **English Made Simple**
- 199? **A Singular Kinda Guy**
- 1989 Speed-the-Play (later revised in 1994)
- 1989 **Ancient History** (later revised in 1996)

Mere Mortals and Others (1997) or Mere Mortals: Six One-Act Comedies (1998)

- 1991 Foreplay, or, The Art of Fugue (revised edition)
- 1990 Mere Mortals
- 1997 **Time Flies**
- 1989 Speed-the-Play (revised edition)
- 1997 **Dr. Fritz, or, The Forces of Light**
- 1995 **Degas, C'est Moi** (later revised in 1998)

Long Ago And Far Away and Other Short Plays (Revised Edition) (1999)

- 1993 Long Ago and Far Away (revised edition)
- 1991 Foreplay, or, The Art of Fugue
- 1989 Seven Menus
- 1990 Mere Mortals
- 1989 Speed-the-Play

Lives of the Saints: Seven One-Act Plays (2000)

- 1999 **Enigma Variations**
- 1999 **The Mystery at Twicknam Vicarage**
- 1999 **Babel's In Arms**
- 1999 **Soap Opera**
- 1999 **Lives of the Saints**
- 2000 **Arabian Nights**
- 1999 **Captive Audience**

Time Flies and Other Short Plays (2001) (Note: Contains all of the plays written since the publication of "All In The Timing: Fourteen Plays".)

- 1997 Time Flies
- 1995 Degas, C'est Moi (revised edition)
- 1997 Dr. Fritz, or, The Forces of Light
- 1999 Babel's In Arms
- 2000 Arabian Nights
- 1999 Enigma Variations
- 1999 The Mystery at Twicknam Vicarage
- 1999 Soap Opera
- 1999 Lives of the Saints
- 1989 Speed-the-Play (revised edition)
- 200? **Bolero** (Note: Debuted in 2003 at The Old Globe Theatre.)
- 200? **The Green Hill** (Note: Debuted in 2003 at The Old Globe Theatre.)
- 1999 Captive Audience

The Other Woman and Other Short Pieces (2008)

- 2006 **The Other Woman**
- 2008 **St. Francis Talks to the Birds**
- 2006 **The Blizzard** (Note: Debuted on Oct. 23, 2006 via The 24 Hour Plays at the American Airlines Theatre.)
- 2004 **Moby-Dude, or, The Three Minute Whale**

Lives of the Saints: Nine One-Act Plays (2015)

- 20?? **The Goodness of Your Heart**
- 1999 Soap Opera
- 1999 Enigma Variations
- 20?? **Life Signs**
- 20?? **It's All Good**
- 1999 Lives of the Saints
- 1999 The Mystery at Twicknam Vicarage
- 1999 Babel's In Arms
- 20?? **The End of Travel**

Plays Released on Playing On Air: Short Audio Plays

- 2006 The Blizzard
- 20?? The Goodness of Your Heart
- 2008 St. Francis Preaches to the Birds
- 2017 The Mystery at Twicknam Vicarage
- 2021 **Locked and Loaded. Can I Help You?**
- 2021 **Dummy Dialogue**
- 2023 **Second Sight**
- 2024 **Kansas Anymore**

Other Radio Plays

- 1981 Canvas (Note: Performed as a radio adaptation for the National Radio Theatre.)
- 1983 **Homo Obliteratus** (Note: A radio adaptation of David Ives’s short story, on National Radio Theatre.)
- 1999 Mere Mortals (Note: Broadcast on NPR through LA Theatreworks.)
- 2000 **Bartleby the Scrivener** (Note: For “The Next Big Thing,” WNYC.)
- 2004 **Rimbaud vs. Mom** (Note: For Kurt Andersen’s “Studio 360.”)
- 2004 Moby-Dude, or, The Three Minute Whale (Note: For a program about Melville’s Moby-Dick on Kurt Andersen’s “Studio 360” (the program won a Peabody Award).)
- 2005 **Metro-Goldwyn-Freud** (Note: For Kurt Andersen’s “Studio 360” on NPR.)

Miscellaneous Plays

- 202? The Rattigan Room
- 202? My Name Is Legion (a monologue)
- 2024 Emily Dickinson Enters Into Heaven
