= Thomas Kail =

American filmmaker (born 1977)

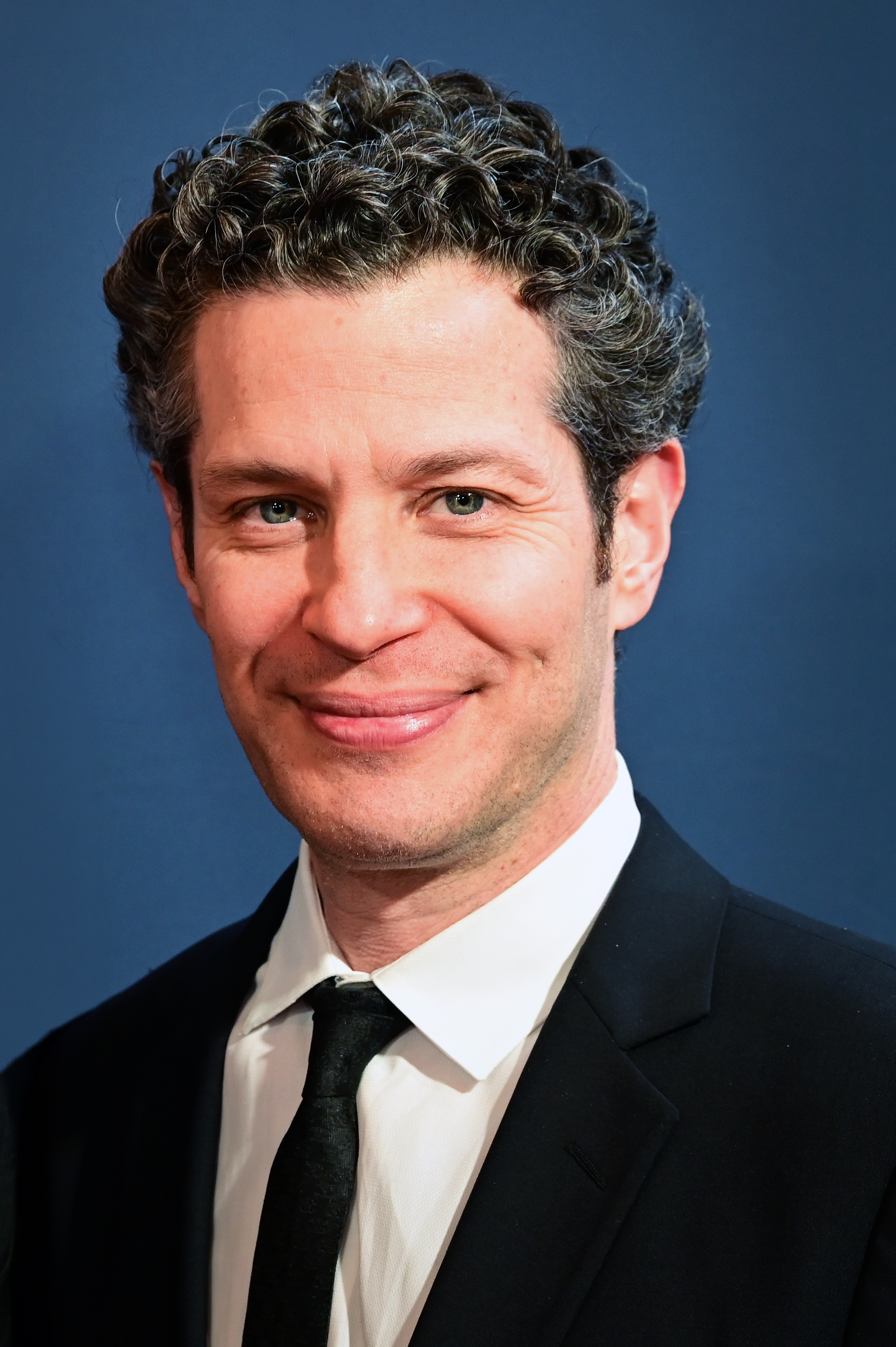
- Kail in 2026
- Born: January 20, 1977 (age 49); Alexandria, Virginia, U.S.
- Occupations: Theatre director; television director; producer
- Years active: 2005–present
- Spouses: Angela Christian (div. 2019); Michelle Williams (m. 2020)
- Children: 3

Thomas Kail (born January 20, 1977) is an American theatre director, television director, and producer. He is known for directing the Off-Broadway and Broadway productions of Lin-Manuel Miranda's musicals In the Heights and Hamilton, garnering the 2016 Tony Award for Best Direction of a Musical for the latter. Kail was awarded the Kennedy Center Honor in 2018. He has also directed the television series Fosse/Verdon (2019), for which he was nominated for two Primetime Emmy Awards.

== Early life and education ==
Kail grew up in Alexandria, Virginia and graduated from Sidwell Friends School in 1995 and subsequently from Wesleyan University in 1999. He remains good friends with Lin-Manuel Miranda, with whom he co-created, along with Anthony Veneziale, the freestyle hip-hop group Freestyle Love Supreme. Kail is Jewish.

== Career ==
After graduating from Wesleyan University, Kail became assistant stage manager at New Jersey's American Stage Company.

Kail directed the 24 Hour Plays benefit performances in 2007 and 2008, where "6 short plays are written, rehearsed, directed, and performed in 24 hours." In 2007, he directed Julia Jordan's A Bus Stop Play, and Beau Willimon's Zusammenbruch in 2008. Both shows played at the American Airlines Theatre on Broadway.

Kail directed the hit Broadway musical In the Heights, which garnered him a Tony Award nomination for Best Direction of a Musical. The musical premiered on Broadway, starting in previews on February 14, 2008, with an official opening on March 9, 2008, at the Richard Rodgers Theatre.

Kail directed Broke-ology, which played from October 5, 2009, to November 22, 2009, at the Lincoln Center Theater Off-Broadway. This play garnered Kail an AUDELCO Award nomination for Best Director of a Dramatic Production. Kail also staged the world premiere at the Williamstown Theatre Festival. In 2009, Kail also directed the New York City Center's Encores! production of the musical The Wiz.

Kail directed Eric Simonson's play Lombardi, based on Green Bay Packers coach Vince Lombardi through a week in the 1965 season, as he attempts to lead his team to the championship. Lombardi officially premiered on Broadway at the Circle in the Square Theatre on October 21, 2010.

He then directed the Off-Broadway run of Nathan Louis Jackson's When I Come to Die, which ran in January and February 2011.

Kail reunited with Lombardi playwright Eric Simonson on Magic/Bird, a new play chronicling the intertwined life stories of basketball Hall of Famers Larry Bird and Earvin "Magic" Johnson. The play premiered on Broadway at the Longacre Theatre on March 21, 2012, in previews, officially on April 11, 2012, and closed on May 12, 2012. Kail directed, with the cast that featured Kevin Daniels as "Magic" Johnson and Tug Coker as Larry Bird.

Kail continued his collaboration with Lin-Manuel Miranda, directing the musical Hamilton in 2015, both Off-Broadway and on Broadway, for which he won a Tony Award.

Kail directed Grease: Live for Paramount Television, screened live on Fox on January 31, 2016; the world premiere of Dry Powder with Hank Azaria, Claire Danes, John Krasinski and Sanjit De Silva which ran from March to May 2016 at The Public Theater in New York City; and Tiny Beautiful Things, also at The Public, from November to December 2016.

On July 5, 2018, FX announced an eight-episode order for a limited-series entitled Fosse/Verdon, with Sam Rockwell playing the role of Bob Fosse and Michelle Williams playing the role of Gwen Verdon. On October 25, 2018, it was reported that Thomas Kail would direct at least four of the series' eight episodes and he would go on to direct a total of five episodes. Kail was nominated for Outstanding Directing – Movies for Television and Limited Series by the Directors Guild of America for the episode "Nowadays."

In May 2023, it was announced that Kail would direct a live action adaptation of the Disney animated film Moana, making his narrative feature directorial debut. He was also attached to direct and co-produce the remake of Fiddler on the Roof for Amazon MGM Studios.

== Personal life ==
Kail began a relationship with theatre actress Angela Christian in 2006; they divorced in 2019. In December 2019, it was announced that he was engaged to Fosse/Verdon actress Michelle Williams, who was expecting their first child together; they married in March 2020. Their son, Hart, was born by June that year. In May 2022, Williams revealed she was pregnant with their second child together, who was born later in 2022. In early 2025, via surrogate, Kail and Williams welcomed their third child together.

Kail and Williams are raising their children within Judaism, and Williams (who is not Jewish) is studying the religion herself. Williams also has a daughter from a previous relationship with actor Heath Ledger.

== Works ==
=== Film ===
Year	Title	Director	Producer	Notes
2020	We Are Freestyle Love Supreme	No	Yes	Documentary film
2020	Hamilton	Yes	Yes	
2023	World's Best	No	Yes	
2026	Moana	Yes	Executive	

=== Television ===
Year	Title	Director	Executive Producer	Writer	Notes
2006	Critical Hours	Yes	Yes	Yes	TV pilot
2009	Storymakers	Yes	No	No	
2009	The Electric Company	Yes	No	No	Musical director
2010	The Oprah Winfrey Oscar Special	Yes	No	No	
2012	2 Broke Girls	Yes	No	No	3 episodes
2015	The Jack and Triumph Show	Yes	No	No	2 episodes
2016	Grease Live!	Yes	Co-executive	No	TV special
2019	Fosse/Verdon	Yes	Yes	No	5 episodes
2023	Up Here	Yes	No	No	2 episodes
2024	We Were the Lucky Ones	Yes	No	No	2 episodes

=== As himself ===
Year	Title	Notes
2008	Roadtrip Nation	TV episode
2009	In the Heights: Chasing Broadway Dreams	Episode of PBS' Great Performances

=== Theater ===
==== Director ====
Year	Title	Venue	Notes
2005	In the Heights	Eugene O'Neill Theater Center	Regional
2007	In the Heights	37 Arts Theater	Off-Broadway
2007	The 24 Hour Plays	American Airlines Theatre	Broadway
2008	In the Heights	Richard Rodgers Theatre	Broadway
2009	Broke-ology	Mitzi E. Newhouse Theatre	Off-Broadway
2009	In the Heights	Various	US Tour
2010	Lombardi	Circle in the Square	Broadway
2011	When I Come to Die	Duke on 42nd Street	Off-Broadway
2011	In the Heights	Various	US Tour
2012	Magic/Bird	Longacre Theatre	Broadway
2015	Hamilton	The Public Theater	Off-Broadway
2016	Dry Powder	The Public Theater	Off-Broadway
2016	Daphne's Dive	Signature Center	
2016–present	Hamilton	Richard Rodgers Theatre	Broadway
2016–present	Hamilton	Various	US Tour
2016	Tiny Beautiful Things	The Public Theater	Off-Broadway
2017–present	Hamilton	Victoria Palace Theatre	West End
2018	Kings	The Public Theater	Off-Broadway
2019–2020	Freestyle Love Supreme (Also producer)	Greenwich House Theatre	Off-Broadway
2019	Derren Brown: Secret	Cort Theatre	Broadway
2019	Freestyle Love Supreme	Booth Theatre	Broadway
2019	The Wrong Man	Robert W. Wilson MCC Theater Space	Off-Broadway
2023	Sweeney Todd: The Demon Barber of Fleet Street	Lunt-Fontanne Theatre	Broadway
2025	Anna Christie	St. Ann's Warehouse	Off-Broadway
2026	Proof	Booth Theatre	Broadway

==== Performer ====
Year	Title	Venue
2014	Faust: The Concert	City Center

== Accolades ==
Year	Award	Category	Nominated work	Result	Ref.
2007	Outer Critics Circle Award	Outstanding Director of a Musical	In the Heights	Nominated	
2007	Drama Desk Award	Outstanding Director of a Musical	In the Heights	Nominated	
2007	SDC Joseph A. Callaway Award	Best Director	In the Heights	Won	
2008	Tony Award	Best Director of a Musical	In the Heights	Nominated	
2010	AUDELCO Award	Best Director of a Dramatic Production	Broke-ology	Nominated	
2011	NAACP Award	Best Director of a Musical	In the Heights	Won	
2011	AUDELCO Award	Best Director of a Dramatic Production	When I Come To Die	Nominated	
2014	Drama Desk Award	Outstanding Director of a Play	Family Furniture	Nominated	
2015	Lucille Lortel Award	Outstanding Director	Hamilton	Won	
2015	Outer Critics Circle Award	Outstanding Director of a Musical	Hamilton	Nominated	
2015	Drama Desk Award	Outstanding Director of a Musical	Hamilton	Won	
2016	Tony Award	Best Direction of a Musical	Hamilton	Won	
2016	Primetime Emmy Award	Outstanding Special Class Program	Grease: Live	Won	
2016	Primetime Emmy Award	Outstanding Directing for a Variety Special	Grease: Live	Won	
2018	Laurence Olivier Award	Best Director	Hamilton	Nominated	
2018	Kennedy Center Honors (shared with Andy Blankenbuehler, Alex Lacamoire and Lin-Manuel Miranda)		Hamilton	Honoree	
2019	Primetime Emmy Award	Outstanding Limited Series	Fosse/Verdon	Nominated	
2019	Primetime Emmy Award	Outstanding Directing for a Limited Series, Movie, or Dramatic Special	Fosse/Verdon (Episode: "Who's Got the Pain?")	Nominated	
2020	Grammy Awards	Best Music Film	We Are Freestyle Love Supreme	Nominated	
2020	Directors Guild of America Award	Outstanding Directing – Miniseries or TV Film	Fosse/Verdon (Episode: "Nowadays")	Nominated	
2020	Drama Desk Award	Outstanding Director of a Musical	The Wrong Man	Nominated	
2021	Directors Guild of America Award	Outstanding Directing – Miniseries or TV Film	Hamilton	Nominated	
2021	Primetime Emmy Award	Outstanding Variety Special (Pre-Recorded)	Hamilton	Won	
2021	Primetime Emmy Award	Outstanding Directing for a Limited or Anthology Series or Movie	Hamilton	Nominated	
2023	Drama Desk Award	Outstanding Director of a Musical	Sweeney Todd: The Demon Barber of Fleet Street	Won	
