= Bronx Bombers (play) =

2014 play by Eric Simonson

- Written by: Eric Simonson
- Characters: Yogi Berra; Carmen Berra; Babe Ruth; Joe DiMaggio; Lou Gehrig; Mickey Mantle; Reggie Jackson; Elston Howard; Billy Martin; Thurman Munson; Derek Jeter

Premiere
- Date: September 20, 2013 (Off-Broadway); February 6, 2014 (Broadway)
- Place: Primary Stages (Off-Broadway); Circle in the Square Theatre (Broadway)
- Official website

Bronx Bombers is a play written by Eric Simonson, and produced by Fran Kirmser and Tony Ponturo, in conjunction with the New York Yankees and Major League Baseball. The play focuses on former Yankee Yogi Berra and his wife, Carmen, as they interact with other Yankees from different eras. It made its Broadway debut on February 6, 2014, and closed on March 2, 2014.

== Development ==
Kirmser and Ponturo met while working on the 2009 Broadway revival of Hair. Bronx Bombers is the third play produced by Kirmser and Ponturo to focus on sports, following Lombardi, which followed American football head coach Vince Lombardi, and Magic/Bird, which focused on basketball players Magic Johnson and Larry Bird. Ponturo, who worked in sports marketing before theatre, worked with Major League Baseball (MLB) executives, which enabled him to gain an "endorsement of authenticity" from MLB and the New York Yankees, to write a play about the Yankees franchise. Kirmser and Ponturo sat down with Yogi Berra and his wife, Carmen, to discuss writing a play where the plot would center around them, gaining their approval.

Bronx Bombers began as an Off-Broadway production, premiering at Primary Stages. It ran from September 20 through October 19, 2013. Present day Yankees Mark Teixeira and CC Sabathia promoted the show on Late Night with Jimmy Fallon.

Previews for the Broadway production began on January 10, 2014, and it made its official debut on Broadway at the Circle in the Square Theatre on February 6, 2014. The play was able to recoup only a quarter of its potential box office take of $733,260. The play closed on March 2, 2014, after 29 regular performances.

== Plot overview ==
The show begins in 1977, the day after Reggie Jackson and Billy Martin engaged in a near-brawl during a game. Berra attempts to bring Jackson and Martin back together, with the help of other Yankees stars. In the first scene, Berra brings Martin and Jackson, with team captain Thurman Munson, to his hotel room to settle their argument. Berra spends the night with his wife discussing the problem. Berra then has a dream where he and his wife have dinner with Yankees' greats Joe DiMaggio, Elston Howard, Mickey Mantle, Lou Gehrig, Babe Ruth, and Derek Jeter.

== Cast ==
Peter Scolari and Tracy Shayne starred as Yogi Berra and his wife, Carmen. Scolari and Shayne were married in 2013. Richard Topol and Wendy Makkena played Yogi and Carmen Berra in the Off-Broadway production. Joe Pantoliano was cast in the role of Yogi Berra for the Broadway production, but he dropped out during rehearsals due to "creative differences".

The play features cameos of other famous Yankees. In both the Off-Broadway and Broadway productions, C. J. Wilson played Ruth, Christopher Jackson played Jeter, Francois Battiste played both Jackson and Howard, Chris Henry Coffey played DiMaggio, Bill Dawes played Mantle and Munson, Keith Nobbs played Martin, and John Wernke played Gehrig.
