= Work song (disambiguation) =

A work song is a song that describes human labor.

Work Song may also refer to:

- "Work Song", a song by Charles Mingus on the 1955 album Mingus at the Bohemia
- "Work Song", a song by Don Patterson on the 1966 album Goin' Down Home
- Work Song (Nat Adderley album), a 1960 album
  - "Work Song" (Nat Adderley song), the title track from the album
- "Work Song" (Bill Laswell song), a song by Laswell from the 1983 album Baselines
- "Work Song" (Hozier song), a 2014 song
- Work Song: Three Views of Frank Lloyd Wright, a 2000 play
- "Work Song" (Corbin/Hanner song), a song by Corbin/Hanner from the album Black and White Photograph
- "The Work Song", a song from the 1950 Disney film Cinderella
- Work Song, a 2010 novel by Ivan Doig
- "Happy Working Song", a song from the 2007 Disney film Enchanted

== See also ==
- Work Song: Three Views of Frank Lloyd Wright, a 2000 play by Jeffrey Hatcher and Eric Simonson
- Work Song: Live at Sweet Basil, a 1990 album by Nat Adderley's Quintet
