= Peter Scolari =

American actor (1955–2021)

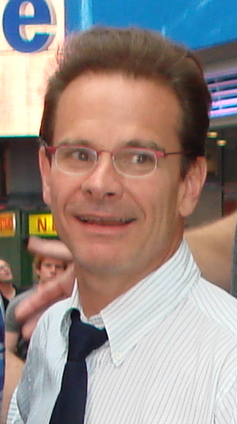
- Scolari in 2010
- Born: Peter Thomas Scolari; September 12, 1955; New Rochelle, New York, U.S.
- Died: October 22, 2021 (aged 66); Manhattan, New York, U.S.
- Occupation: Actor
- Years active: 1978–2021
- Spouses: Lisa Kretzchmar (m. 1981; div. 1983); Debra Steagal (m. 1986; div. 1996); Cathy Trien (m. 1998; div. 2004); Tracy Shayne (m. 2013)
- Children: 4

Peter Thomas Scolari (September 12, 1955 – October 22, 2021) was an American actor. He was best known for his roles as Henry Desmond in the ABC sitcom Bosom Buddies (1980–1982) and Michael Harris on the CBS sitcom Newhart (1984–1990), the latter of which earned him three consecutive nominations for Primetime Emmy Awards for Outstanding Supporting Actor in a Comedy Series from 1987 to 1989.

Scolari had roles as Wayne Szalinski in the Disney sitcom Honey, I Shrunk the Kids: The TV Show (1997–2000) and as Tad Horvath in the HBO series Girls (2012–2017), the latter of which earned him the Primetime Emmy Award for Outstanding Guest Actor in a Comedy Series. He had recurring roles as Gillian B. Loeb in the superhero crime series Gotham (2015) and Bishop Thomas Marx in the supernatural series Evil (2019–2021).

He acted in the films The Rosebud Beach Hotel (1984), Corporate Affairs (1990), That Thing You Do! (1996), and The Polar Express (2004). On stage, he portrayed Yogi Berra in the play Bronx Bombers (2014) and acted in the Larry Gelbart's Sly Fox (2004), Eric Simonson's Magic/Bird (2012), and Nora Ephron's Lucky Guy (2013). He also acted in replacement roles in the musicals Hairspray in 2003 and Wicked in 2016.

== Early life and education ==
Scolari was born in New Rochelle, New York, to Arthur and Barbara (née Fay) Scolari, and was raised in Scarsdale along with an older sister and two younger brothers. His father was of Italian descent and played semi-professional baseball before becoming a lawyer. His mother was a singer prior to meeting Scolari's father and later worked with the Alcohol Rehabilitation arm of the Tidewater Psychiatric Institute in Virginia Beach, Virginia. In an interview with the Toronto Star Scolari said that his father was a psychologically abusive, "rageful man", and that his mother struggled with alcoholism. Scolari added that his parents "stayed together for the kids and also because they were hopelessly in love with each other, but they were totally incompatible."

At the age of 13, Scolari did some animation voice acting work and performed in plays while attending Edgemont High School in Scarsdale, where he also participated in football, baseball and track. At 16 years of age he starred as Finch in a high school production of How to Succeed in Business Without Really Trying and came to the realization that he wanted to be an actor professionally.

In 1972, he enrolled at Occidental College in Los Angeles as a theater arts major, but left a year later and returned to New York after his father died. He joined the Colonnades Theatre Lab, a repertory theatre in Manhattan, working with actors such as Danny DeVito, Rhea Perlman, Jeff Goldblum and Michael O'Keefe. Scolari was also working on a degree in comparative literature at City College of New York. During this time, Scolari appeared in multiple off-Broadway plays and met Finnish actor Paavo Tammim, who taught him to juggle. He also studied mime and learned to ride a unicycle. His performance in a 1974 production of "Reflections" received a rave review from The New York Times. In 1979 he returned to Los Angeles.

== Career ==
=== 1978–1990: Bosom Buddies and Newhart ===
Credited under pseudonym Barney Tramble, Scolari's first film role was in the 1978 X rated film Take Off. He played a teenager named Kookie and his performance did not involve nudity. Scolari was signed to do an NBC pilot in 1979 titled The Further Adventures Of Wally Brown, a show that did not get picked up. He starred in the short-lived 1980 sitcom Goodtime Girls as Benny, the juggling neighbor of the title characters. His big break came when he was cast with Tom Hanks in the 1980 sitcom, Bosom Buddies. Scolari and Hanks play a couple of advertising copywriters who disguise themselves as women in order to live in an affordable New York apartment – a women's-only residence called the Susan B. Anthony Hotel. A different actor had initially been cast alongside Hanks, but things didn't work out. Scolari happened to be playing a guest role on an adjacent sound stage and was auditioned for the role. The show's pilot was shot a few days later. Scolari played Henry Desmond, whose female pseudonym was Hildegard, and Hanks played Kip Wilson, who went by the name Buffy. Bosom Buddies started out with good ratings, but failed to hold the public's interest and was canceled after two seasons and 37 episodes. His next starring role was in the 1983 sitcom Baby Makes Five, which was cancelled after only five episodes.

He starred in the 1984 comedy film The Rosebud Beach Hotel, about a couple – played by Scolari and Colleen Camp – who turn their hotel into a brothel, by hiring sex workers to work as bellhops. That same year Scolari joined the cast of Newhart as Michael Harris, a preppily-dressed, wannabe yuppie, and local TV producer of the fictional talk show "Vermont Today". Harris was a recurring character in the show's second season and the character was so popular with audiences that executive producer Barry Kemp signed Scolari to be a regular cast member in the show's following season, before it was even confirmed that there would be a third season. His role earned Scolari three Emmy nominations for best supporting actor in a comedy and remained with the show until its conclusion in 1990. During this time, Scolari also got to showcase his vaudevillian talents during three episodes of the annual television special, Circus of the Stars, including juggling with knives and fire, as well as juggling on a tightrope. Scolari once again worked with Hanks on his directorial debut, That Thing You Do! about a fictional 1960s rock band called the Wonders. Scolari plays the role of Troy Chesterfield, the host of a variety show on which the Wonders appear.

=== 1991–2011: Established roles ===
In 1993, Scolari starred in the series Family Album about a couple who move with their children back to their hometown of Philadelphia to be closer to their aging parents. Actress Gina Hecht was initially selected to play the wife of Scolari's character, but was replaced by Pamela Reed just two days before the show's pilot was shot. Scolari told the Las Vegas Review-Journal in 1993 that he and Reed had "instant rapport", however the show lasted one season. Two years later he starred in the series Dweebs, which centers around the employees of a software firm. Scolari plays Warren Mosbey, the company's eccentric, socially-inept, tech-genius owner. The show was cancelled after one season. In 1996, Scolari also starred as Littlechap in a version of the stage musical Stop the World – I Want to Get Off, produced for the A&E television network.

Scolari appeared in such off-Broadway productions as Old Man Joseph and His Family, The Exonerated, In the Wings, It Must Be Him and White's Lies. Scolari starred in Honey, I Shrunk the Kids: The TV Show over the show's three seasons. Scolari plays inventor Wayne Szalinski, the role originally played by Rick Moranis in the Honey, I Shrunk the Kids series of films. During the show's run, he also played astronaut Pete Conrad in the 1998 miniseries From the Earth to the Moon, co-produced by Hanks, Ron Howard and Brian Grazer. Scolari appeared on Broadway in the musical Hairspray, as Wilbur Turnblad. Scolari and Hanks also provided voices in the 2004 animated film The Polar Express.

=== 2012–2021: Resurgence with Girls ===
In 2012, he acted playing various roles including Pat Riley, Red Auerbach, Jerry Buss, Bob Woolf in the play Magic/Bird on Broadway. He later had a recurring role as Tad Horvath, the father of Lena Dunham's character on the HBO coming-of-age comedy-drama Girls from 2012 to 2017. He won the Primetime Emmy Award for Outstanding Guest Actor in a Comedy Series in 2016. In 2013, he returned to Broadway in the Nora Ephron newspaper play Lucky Guy, which reunited him with his Bosom Buddies co-star Tom Hanks. He played Gotham City's corrupt police commissioner Gillian B. Loeb in Fox's superhero crime drama Gotham from 2014 to 2019. In 2014, he portrayed Yogi Berra in the Eric Simonson sports play Bronx Bombers on Broadway. His wife, Tracy Shayne, played Berra's wife Carmen. Scolari returned to Broadway in the musical Wicked, as a replacement playing the Wizard of Oz from 2016 to 2017. He played the role of a show business manager in the 2019 biographical FX miniseries Fosse/Verdon, and played Bishop Marx on the series Evil, from 2019 until his death.

== Personal life ==
=== Marriages and family ===
Scolari was married four times. His first marriage was to Brooklyn attorney Lisa Kretzchmar. They divorced in 1983. He married Debra Steagal, a costume designer he met while filming The Rosebud Beach Hotel in 1986, and they had two children. He later wed actress Cathy Trien, with whom he also had two children. In 2013 he married his longtime girlfriend, actress Tracy Shayne. The couple remained together until Scolari's death.

=== Illness and death ===
Scolari's struggles with substance abuse and bipolar disorder were featured on a 2014 episode of Oprah: Where Are They Now?. Scolari died from leukemia in Manhattan on October 22, 2021, at the age of 66. He had been diagnosed with the disease two years earlier.

== Acting credits ==
=== Film ===
Year	Title	Role	Notes
1978	Take Off	Kookie	Segment: "1950s" (Credited as Barney Tramble)
1984	The Rosebud Beach Hotel	Elliot Garner	
1990	Corporate Affairs	Simon Tanner	
1993	Ticks	Charles Danson	Video
1994	Camp Nowhere	Donald Himmel	
1996	That Thing You Do!	Troy Chesterfield	
2002	Sorority Boys	Louis	
2004	The Polar Express	Billy the Lonely Boy	Motion capture only
2005	Magnificent Desolation: Walking on the Moon 3D	Pete Conrad	Voice; Documentary
2006	Mentor	Jonathan Parks	
2006	Cathedral Pines	Father Mike McGary	
2007	Suburban Girl	Mickey Lamm	
2007	A Plumm Summer	Agent Hardigan	
2012	Letting Go	Bill	
2016	Dean	Patrick	
2018	All You Can Eat	Dr. Zakreski	
2020	Looks That Kill	Paul Richardson	Final film role

=== Television ===
Year	Title	Role	Notes
1979	Wally Brown	Douglas Burdett	Unknown episode
1979	Angie	Kenny	Episode: "The Thief"
1980	Goodtime Girls	Benny Loman	13 episodes
1980–1982	Bosom Buddies	Henry Desmond; Hildegarde 'Hilde' Desmond	37 episodes
1982	Circus of the Stars #7	Himself	TV special
1982	Remington Steele	Albie Fervitz	Episode: "Steele Waters Run Deep"
1982	Missing Children: A Mother's Story	Woody	Television film
1983	Carpool	Robert Duff	Television film
1983	Happy Days	Jake	Episode: "May the Best Man Win"
1983	Baby Makes Five	Eddie Riddle	5 episodes
1984	Amazons	Dr. Jerry Menzies	Television film
1984	Finder of Lost Loves	Ted Caton	Episode: "A Gift"
1984	Steambath	Paul	Episode: "Tandy's Legacy"
1984–1990	Newhart	Michael Harris	142 episodes
1986	Hotel	Tom	Episode: "Shadows of Doubt: Part 1"
1986	Family Ties	Paul Kenter	Episode "Once in Love with Elyse"
1986	Mr. Bill's Real Life Adventures	Mr. Bill	Television film
1986	You Are the Jury	Stephen Best	Episode: "The State of Ohio vs. James Wolsky"
1986	The Love Boat	Frank Hobbs; Wellington David Rothmeyer	3 episodes
1986	Fresno	Waiter	Miniseries (uncredited)
1987	Fatal Confession: A Father Dowling Mystery	Chris Robinson	Television film
1987	The New Mike Hammer	Andy Shales	Episode: "Green Blizzard"
1987	Harry Anderson's Sideshow	Performer	Television special
1988	The Twilight Zone	Delos of Atlantis; Leonard Randall	Episode: "The Trance"
1989	CBS Summer Playhouse	Morgan	Episode: "Microchips"
1989	Trying Time	Howard LaMotta	Episode: "Death and Taxes"
1989	The Ryan White Story	David Day	Television film
1990	Encyclopedia Brown	Bandini	Episode: "The Case of the Incredible Culpepper"
1990	World's Greatest Magicians... At the Magic Castle	Unknown	Television film
1991	Danger Team	Police Officer Shields	Television film
1991	Fire: Trapped on the 37th Floor	Paul DeWitt	Television film
1991	Perfect Harmony	Derek Sanders	Television film
1991	Perry Mason: The Case of the Glass Coffin	David Katz	Television film
1992	The House on Sycamore Street	Dr. Zachary 'Zach' Drummond	Television film
1992	Nurses	George Myrock	Episode: "Our Fred"
1992–1995	Batman: The Animated Series	John Hamner; Gunther Hardwicke / Shark	Voice, 2 episodes
1993	Fallen Angels	Clerk	Episode: "I'll Be Waiting"
1993–1995	The Mommies	Ken Ballantine	2 episodes
1993	Family Album	Jonathan Lerner	6 episodes
1993–1994	Animaniacs	Wilford Wolf, Driver	Voice, 2 episodes
1994	Burke's Law	Johnny Lake	Episode: "Who Killed the Host at the Roast?"
1994	Empty Nest	Dieter Dietz	Episode: "Brotherly Shove"
1994	Lois & Clark: The New Adventures of Superman	Stuart Hofferman	Episode: "The Source"
1994, 2001	Touched by an Angel	Charles Hibbard, Tim Albright	2 episodes
1994–1995	Dave's World	Fred, Kenny's Boss	2 episodes
1995	A Whole New Ballgame	Glenn	2 episodes
1995	Dweebs	Warren Mosbey	10 episodes
1995	Can't Hurry Love	Colin	Episode: "Three Blind Dates"
1995–1996	Gargoyles	Preston Vogel	Voice, 5 episodes
1996	The Home Court	Kenyon Stanton	Episode: "Syd & Sensibility"
1996	The Drew Carey Show	Councilman Kemp	Episode: "What the Zoning Inspector Saw"
1996	Stop the World, I Want to Get Off	Littlechap	Television film
1996	Talk to Me	Howard Grant	Television film
1996	For Hope	Date #2 (uncredited)	Television film
1997	Duckman	Brad	Voice, episode: "From Brad to Worse"
1997	The Nanny	Leslie Tilbert	Episode: "The Bank Robbery"
1997	George & Leo	Dr. Michael Harris	Episode: "The Cameo Episode"
1997–1998	Pinky and the Brain	Weird Guy, Mr. Perfect	Voice, 2 episodes
1997–2000	Honey, I Shrunk the Kids: The TV Show	Wayne Szalinski / Various	66 episodes
1998	From the Earth to the Moon	Pete Conrad	Episode: "Can We Do This?"
1998	Hey Arnold!	Doug	Voice, episode: "Stinky Goes Hollywood/Olga Gets Engaged"
2000	The Ultimate Christmas Present	Edwin Hadley	Television film
2001	Ally McBeal	Hooley	Episode: "Nine One One"
2002	Reba	Parker Reynolds	Episode: "The Story of a Divorce"
2002	The King of Queens	Ron	Episode: "No Orleans"
2002	ER	Kyle Evans	Episode: "Bygones"
2002	The West Wing	Antares C.E.O. Jake Kimball	Episode: "Enemies Foreign and Domestic"
2002	What I Like About You	Dad	Episode: "Pilot"
2002	What's New, Scooby-Doo?	Prof. Higginson	Voice, episode: "Scooby-Doo Christmas"
2003	Sabrina, the Teenage Witch	Ringmaster	Episode: "Cirque du Sabrina"
2005	Listen Up	Andrew McKillop	2 episodes
2006	Big Love	Seminary Teacher	Episode: "Affair"
2006	American Dad!	Himself / Limo Driver	Voice, episode: "Roger n' Me"
2011	Batman: The Brave and the Bold	Ray Palmer / Atom	Voice, episode: "Sword of the Atom!"
2012–2017	Girls	Tad Horvath	Recurring role; 21 episodes
2013	White Collar	Zimmer the Keymaster	Episode: "Brass Tacks"
2015	Gotham	Commissioner Gillian B. Loeb	5 episodes
2015	Chopped	Himself	Episode: "Tournament of Stars: Actors"
2016	Madoff	Peter Madoff	4 episodes
2017	Odd Mom Out	Lawyer	Episode: "Jury Doody"
2017	Law & Order: Special Victims Unit	Dr. Dennis Barkley	Episode: "Unintended Consequences"
2018	The Good Fight	Greg	Episode: "Day 436"
2018	Murphy Brown	Fred Noonan	Episode: "The Wheels on the Dog Go Round and Round"
2019	Fosse/Verdon	Mel	2 episodes
2019–2021	Evil	Bishop Thomas Marx	Recurring role, 9 episodes
2020	Blue Bloods	Captain Higgins	Episode: "Careful What You Wish For"
2021	Lisey's Story	Dave Debusher	2 episodes

=== Theatre ===
Year	Title	Role	Venue	Refs.
2003	Hairspray	Wilbur Turnblad (replacement)	Neil Simon Theatre, Broadway	
2004	Sly Fox	Chief of Police	Ethel Barrymore Theatre, Broadway	
2012	Magic/Bird	Pat Riley / Red Auerbach / Jerry Buss / Bob Woolf	Longacre Theatre, Broadway	
2013	Lucky Guy	Michael Daly	Broadhurst Theatre, Broadway	
2014	Bronx Bombers	Yogi Berra	Circle in the Square Theatre, Broadway	
2016–2017	Wicked	The Wonderful Wizard of Oz (replacement)	Gershwin Theatre, Broadway	

== Awards and nominations ==
Year	Award	Category	Nominated work	Result	Ref.
1987	Primetime Emmy Award	Outstanding Supporting Actor in a Comedy Series	Newhart	Nominated	
1988	Primetime Emmy Award	Outstanding Supporting Actor in a Comedy Series	Newhart	Nominated	
1989	Primetime Emmy Award	Outstanding Supporting Actor in a Comedy Series	Newhart	Nominated	
2012	Critics' Choice Television Award	Best Guest Performer in a Comedy Series	Girls	Nominated	
2016	Primetime Emmy Award	Outstanding Guest Actor in a Comedy Series	Girls	Won	
