= Priscilla Morrill =

American actress (1927–1994)

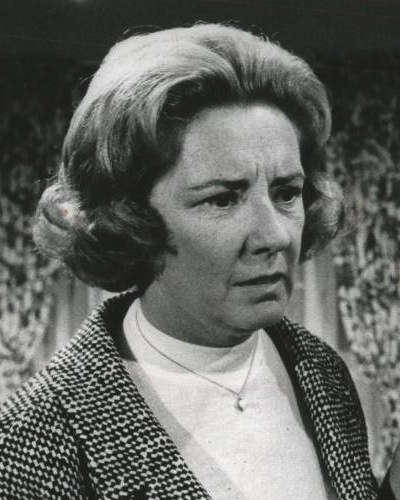
- Morrill in 1974
- Born: Priscilla Alden Morrill; June 4, 1927; Boston, Massachusetts, U.S.
- Died: November 9, 1994 (aged 67); Los Angeles, California, U.S.
- Education: Carnegie Institute
- Occupation: Actress
- Spouse: Paul Hendley Bryson (m. 1954)

Priscilla Alden Morrill (June 4, 1927 – November 9, 1994) was an American actress. She is best known for playing Edie Grant on the sitcom The Mary Tyler Moore Show in 1973 and 1975.

== Career ==
The only child of Joseph Henry Morrill and Reina Prichard Hadley, Priscilla Morrill was born and raised in Boston, Massachusetts. She graduated from the Carnegie Institute before making her stage debut opposite John Carradine in Julius Caesar. She made her Broadway debut in The Relapse with Cyril Ritchard.

Morrill's first television performance was on the Outer Limits episode "The Man with the Power" in 1963. She was a frequent guest star on numerous television series and in television movies. Morrill had recurring roles on Family, Bret Maverick, Santa Barbara, The Mary Tyler Moore Show and Newhart. Jean Stapleton stated in an interview for the Archive of American Television that Morrill was the stand-in for her in the ninth-season episode of All in the Family, "A Girl Like Edith", in which Stapleton had a dual role.

In addition to guest-starring roles, she also co-starred in two short-lived series: In the Beginning starring McLean Stevenson, and Baby Makes Five starring Peter Scolari. Morrill made a guest appearance in MacGyver, in the season two episode "D.O.A.: MacGyver" as Helen Wilson. She also was on the Golden Girls in the episode "In a Bed of Rose's". She made her final onscreen appearance on an episode of Coach in 1992.

== Death ==
On November 9, 1994, Morrill died of complications of a kidney infection at Cedars-Sinai Medical Center in Los Angeles at the age of 67. She was survived by her husband, Paul Bryson, to whom she had been married since 1954. The couple had lived in Port Hueneme, California. She was cremated and her ashes scattered at sea.

== Selected filmography ==
Year	Title	Role	Notes
1963	The Outer Limits	Vera Finley	Episode: "The Man with the Power"
1966	The F.B.I.	Ann King	1 episode
1966	Stagecoach	Eloise	Uncredited role
1967	The Felony Squad	Liz McCready	1 episode
1968	The Wild Wild West	Phalah	Episode: "The Night of the Undead"
1968	Mannix	Janet Paulson	Season 2 Episode 07: "Edge of the Knife"
1973	Breezy	Dress Customer	
1973-75	The Mary Tyler Moore Show	Edie Grant	5 episodes
1974	Barnaby Jones	Mrs. Bryner	Episode: "The Last Contract"
1975	Kolchak: The Night Stalker	Griselda	Episode: "The Trevi Collection"
1976	All in the Family	Katie Korman	Episode: "Mr. Edith Bunker"
1976-77	Family	Elaine Hogan	8 episodes
1977	Father Knows Best (reunion)	Louise	Episode: "Home for Christmas"
1977	Three's Company	Mrs. Snow	Episode: "And Mother Makes Four"
1977	The Jeffersons	Mrs. Fletcher	Episode: "The Costume Party"
1978	The Love Boat	Ida Snead	Episode: "Taking Sides/A Friendly Little Game/Going by the Book"
1979	Welcome Back, Kotter	Mrs. Gladstone Trevors-Smythe	Episode: "The Breadwinners"
1981	It's a Living	Dean Pressman	Episode: "Making the Grade"
1982	One Day at a Time	Grandma Cooper	Episode: "Gift Horses"
1982-84	Family Ties	Kate Donnelly	2 episodes
1983	The Powers of Matthew Star	Mrs. Aldridge	Episode: "Starr Knight"
1984	St. Elsewhere	Sister Teresa	2 episodes
1985	Scarecrow and Mrs. King	Margaret Brock	Episode: "Spiderweb"
1985	Three's a Crowd	Judge Hancock	Episode: "September Song"
1985-86	Santa Barbara	Mother Isabel	16 episodes
1985-89	Newhart	Marian "Mary" Vanderkellen	7 episodes
1986	The Golden Girls	Lucille Beatty	Episode: "In a Bed of Rose's"
1987	MacGyver	Helen Wilson	Episode: "D. O. A.: MacGyver"
1989	CBS Summer Playhouse	Miss Gordon	Episode: "Shivers"
1989-92	Coach	Mrs. Rizzendough	4 episodes
1991	Blossom	Mrs. Whiting	Episode: "School Daze"
