= Gerald Charles Dickens (actor) =

British actor and performer of the works of Charles Dickens (born 1963)

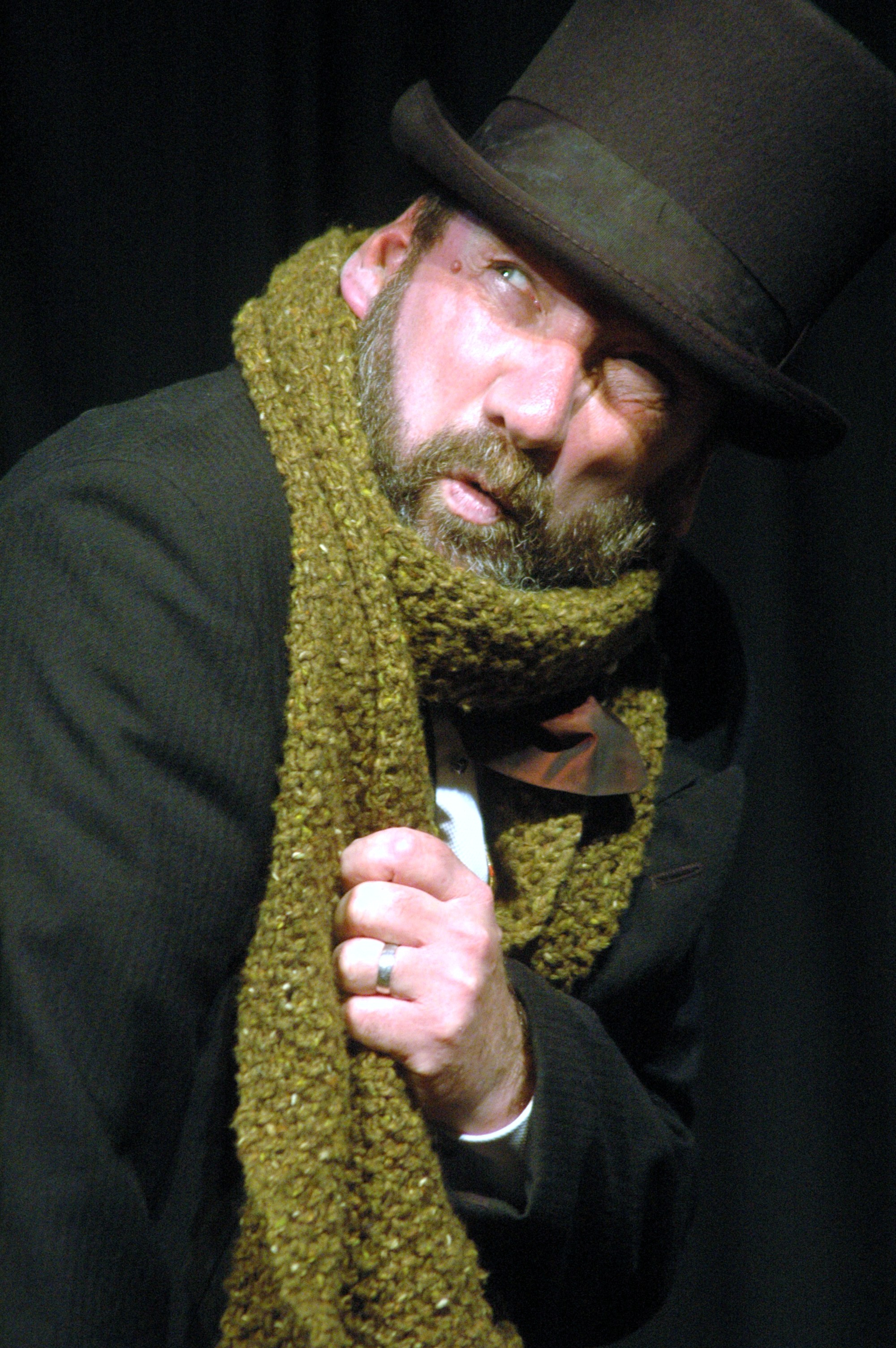
- Gerald Dickens during his one-man show of A Christmas Carol
- Born: 9 October 1963 (age 62); Royal Tunbridge Wells, Kent, England
- Occupations: Actor; performer
- Spouse(s): Lucy Marsh (divorced) Liz Hayes (m. 2015)
- Children: 1
- Relatives: Charles Dickens (great-great-grandfather); Henry Fielding Dickens (great-grandfather); Gerald Charles Dickens (grandfather); Monica Dickens (cousin); Lucinda Hawksley (cousin); Harry Lloyd (cousin)

Gerald Roderick Charles Dickens (born 9 October 1963) is an English actor and performer best known for his one-man shows based on the novels of his great-great-grandfather Charles Dickens. He was the President of the Dickens Fellowship from 2005 to 2007.

== Early life ==
Born in Royal Tunbridge Wells, Kent, the fourth child and second son of David Kenneth Charles Dickens (1925–2005) and his wife Betty (1927–2010), Dickens is the grandson of Gerald Charles Dickens RN (after whom he was named), the great-grandson of Henry Fielding Dickens KC, and the great-great-grandson of Charles Dickens; he is also the cousin of author Monica Dickens, biographer and writer Lucinda Hawksley, and actor Harry Lloyd. Dickens attended Huntleys Secondary School for Boys in Royal Tunbridge Wells and West Kent College.

His acting career started with the youth drama group Design Theatre Workshop in his home town of Tunbridge Wells, with whom he learned the rudiments of stagecraft including improvisations and various exercises designed to develop ways of creating theatre.

== Career ==
Inspired to be an actor by a performance of Nicholas Nickleby by the Royal Shakespeare Company, Gerald Dickens first performed his solo version of A Christmas Carol in America in 1993, returning annually to perform at historic hotels, libraries, theatres and Dickens festivals. In 2009, Dickens' American tour included such Christmas companies as Vaillancourt Folk Art and Byers Choice and has yielded national and local press.

Based on the readings performed by Charles Dickens himself during his own British and American tours, Gerald Dickens performs one-man theatrical adaptations of Great Expectations, Nicholas Nickleby, A Tale of Two Cities and A Christmas Carol, in the latter creating 26 characters in a performance described by The New York Times as "a once in a lifetime brush with literary history." He also performs adaptations of short stories such as The Signal-Man and Doctor Marigold.

Dickens has recorded unabridged audiobooks of The Pickwick Papers and Nicholas Nickleby. In December 2011 he appeared on the BBC's Songs of Praise. A keen golfer, he wrote and performs the two-act play Top Hole!, based on four golfing stories by P. G. Wodehouse. In 2015, at the Music Box Theatre in Minneapolis, he played Charles Dickens in Jeffrey Hatcher's one-hander To Begin With, which was adapted from Dickens' The Life of Our Lord. He played the role again in a 2017 revival. His book, Dickens and Staplehurst: A Biography of a Rail Crash, published in 2021, is concerned with the Staplehurst rail crash in which his famous ancestor was involved. In December 2022 he appeared in Miriam's Dickensian Christmas on the UK's Channel 4 with Miriam Margolyes.

== Personal life ==
In 2004, Dickens won the British TV show The Weakest Link during its 8th season in an episode where the contestants all had famous ancestors.

Gerald Dickens lived in Goudhurst in Kent with his former wife Lucy Marsh, with whom he had a son, Cameron. He married his long-term partner Liz Hayes, a pianist who sometimes accompanies his performances, on 10 August 2015. They live in Abingdon, Oxfordshire.

== See also ==
- Dickens family
