= The Life of Our Lord =

Book about the life of Jesus by Charles Dickens

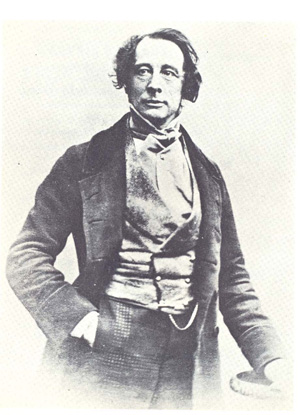
Charles Dickens in 1849

The Life of Our Lord is a book about the life of Jesus of Nazareth written by English novelist Charles Dickens, for his young children, between 1846 and 1849, at about the time that he was writing David Copperfield. The Life of Our Lord was published in 1934, 64 years after Dickens's death.

== Manuscript ==
Dickens wrote The Life of Our Lord exclusively for his children, to whom he read it aloud every Christmas. He strictly forbade publication of The Life during his own lifetime and begged his sister-in-law, Georgina Hogarth, to make sure that the Dickens family "would never even hand the manuscript, or a copy of it, to anyone to take out of the house." His handwritten manuscript was passed down to Georgina Hogarth after Dickens's death in 1870. On her death in 1917, it came into the possession of Sir Henry Fielding Dickens, Dickens's last surviving son. The Dickens family continued to read it at every Christmas and, at the author's request, delayed publication until the last of Dickens's children had died.

The book begins:

My Dear Children, I am very anxious that you should know something about the History of Jesus Christ. For everybody ought to know about Him. No one ever lived who was so good, so kind, so gentle, and so sorry for all people who did wrong, or were in any way ill or miserable, as He was.

There then follows a simple account of Jesus's life and teachings, with an occasional touch of Dickens's humour:

You never saw a locust, because they belong to that country near Jerusalem, which is a great way off. So do camels, but I think you have seen a camel. At all events, they are brought over here, sometimes; and if you would like to see one, I will show you one.

== Publication ==
On the death of Sir Henry Fielding Dickens in 1933, his will provided that, if the majority of his family were in favour of publication, The Life of Our Lord should be given to the world. By majority vote, Sir Henry's widow and children decided to publish the book in London. Through Curtis Brown Ltd., London literary agents, Lady Dickens sold world publication rights for The Life of Our Lord to the Daily Mail for $210,000. The first serial rights for North and South America went to United Feature Syndicate Inc., whose general manager Monte Bourjaily outbid King Features Syndicate, Bell Syndicate, NANA, and NEA. United Features promptly resold The Life of Our Lord to a sufficient number of United States newspapers to avoid giving first publication to a magazine. It was first published, in serial form, in March 1934. In 1934, Simon & Schuster published the first American edition, which became the year's tenth best-selling non-fiction book. In the United Kingdom it was published by Associated Newspapers Ltd, also in 1934.

Dickens's original manuscript was purchased by a group of private collectors and in 1964 was presented to the Free Library of Philadelphia, which has held it ever since.

== Adaptations ==
To Begin With, an adaptation of The Life of Our Lord by the American playwright Jeffrey Hatcher, was performed by the author's great-great-grandson Gerald Charles Dickens in 2015 at the Music Box Theatre in Minneapolis. The play was revived in 2017.

An animated adaptation, The King of Kings, was produced by Mofac Studios in South Korea, was released by Angel Studios on April 11, 2025. The film features the voices of Kenneth Branagh, Pierce Brosnan, Mark Hamill, Oscar Isaac, and Uma Thurman.
