= The Man with the Power =

- The Outer Limits episode
- Episode no.: Season 1 Episode 4
- Directed by: László Benedek
- Written by: Jerome Ross
- Cinematography by: Conrad Hall
- Production code: 8
- Original air date: October 7, 1963

Guest appearances
- Donald Pleasence; Priscilla Morrill; Edward Platt; Fred Beir; Frank Maxwell; John Marley

Episode chronology
← Previous "The Architects of Fear"	Next → "The Sixth Finger"

"The Man with the Power" is an episode of the original The Outer Limits television show. It first aired on October 7, 1963, during the first season.

== Introduction ==
An experiment endows a college professor with powerful telekinetic abilities, which his subconscious mind uses to destroy his enemies, including his employer, Dean Radcliffe.

== Opening narration ==
In the course of centuries, Man has devoured the Earth itself. The Machine Age has dried up the seas of oil. Industry has consumed the heartlands of coal. The Atomic Age has plundered the rare elements — uranium, cobalt, plutonium — leaving behind worthless deposits of lead and ashes. Starvation is at hand. Only here, in the void of space, is there a new source of atomic power. Above us, in the debris of the solar system, in the meteorites and asteroids, are the materials needed to drive the reactors. Yet in their distant, silent orbits, these chunks of matter are beyond the reach of man, beyond the reach of human hands, but not beyond the reach of human minds. Driving along a country road in an ordinary car is a modest man: Harold J. Finley, quiet and profound…

== Plot ==
Harold J. Finley, an unassuming college professor, develops a device that, once implanted in the brain, can manipulate objects through mental control of forces and energy that surround us. Although disregarded as talentless by his family and coworkers, Finley makes an impact with a U.S. space agency in the hopes that he can assist them in retrieving unreachable, space-bound, element-laden asteroids. However, as the professor becomes more familiar with his device, he learns that his subconscious mind has been taking involuntary revenge on those who demean him, including his harping wife, whom he almost kills. As his invention is scheduled to be implanted into the brain of an ambitious astronaut with questionable motives, Finley becomes alarmed, and is determined to stop the procedure. He enters the operating theater just as the surgeon is preparing to implant the device, and destroys him and the head of the asteroid project, along with himself.

== Closing narration ==
Deep beyond the kindest, gentlest soul may lurk violent thoughts, deadly wishes. Someday Man will learn to cope with the monsters of the mind. Then, and only then, when the human mind is truly in control of itself, can we begin to utilize the great and hidden powers of the universe.

== Cast ==
- Donald Pleasence – as Harold J. Finley
- Priscilla Morrill – as Vera Finley
- Edward Platt – as Dean Radcliffe
- Fred Beir – as Steve Crandon
- Frank Maxwell – as Dr. Keenan
- John Marley – as Dr. Sigmund Hindeman
- Paul Lambert – as Dr. Henschell
- Paul Kent – as Detective
- Ann Loos – as Emily Radcliffe
- James McCallion – as Dr. Tremaine
- Harry Ellerbe – as Finley's Doctor
- Jane Barclay – as Nurse
- Pat O'Hara – as Surgeon
- Saul Gross – as 1st Tree Pruner
- Fred Crane – as 2nd Tree Pruner
