= Jeffrey Hatcher =

American writer

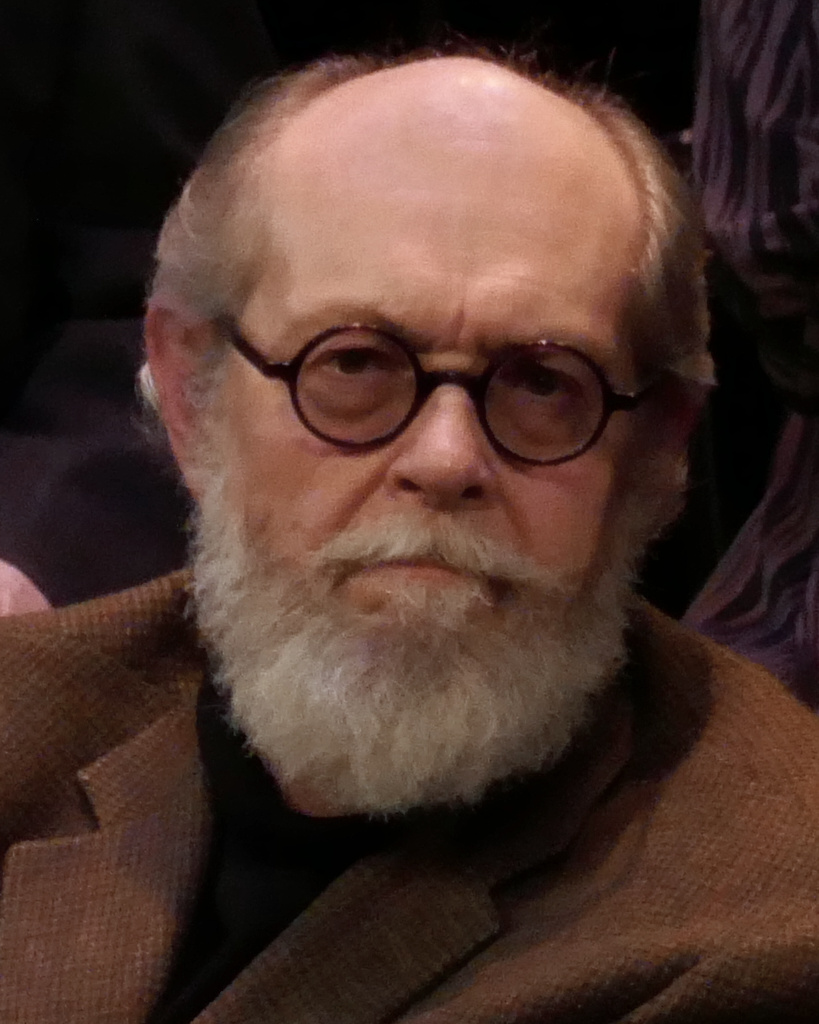
- Hatcher at the History Theatre, St. Paul
- Born: c. 1958 (age c. 67)
- Occupations: Playwright, screenwriter
- Notable work: Compleat Female Stage Beauty; Casanova; The Duchess

Jeffrey Hatcher (born c. 1958) is an American playwright and screenwriter. He is known for writing the stage play Compleat Female Stage Beauty, which he later adapted into a screenplay, shortened to just Stage Beauty (2004). He also co-wrote the stage adaptation of Tuesdays with Morrie with author Mitch Albom, and Three Viewings, a comedy consisting of three monologues - each of which takes place in a funeral home. He wrote the screenplay Casanova for director Lasse Hallström, as well as the screenplay for The Duchess (2008). He has also written for the mystery TV series Columbo and E! Entertainment Television.

== Career ==
Hatcher's original works have been performed across the United States, including on Broadway, as well as internationally. In 2023, American Theatre magazine noted that Hatcher ties for the fifth most-produced playwright in America, with 13 plays in production. The 2022 play "DIAL M FOR MURDER" was the fifth most produced play in 2023, with 9 productions.

Previously, Hatcher adapted Robert Louis Stevenson's novella, The Strange Case of Dr. Jekyll and Mr. Hyde, into a play in which actors play multiple roles, and Mr. Hyde is played by four actors, one of whom is female. The adaptation, which has been called "hipper, more erotic, and theatrically intense...definitely not your grandfather's 'Jekyll and Hyde'", was nominated by the Mystery Writers of America for an Edgar Award for Best Play.

Some of his other plays include Three Viewings, Scotland Road, A Picasso, Neddy, Korczak's Children, Mercy of a Storm, Work Song: Three Views of Frank Lloyd Wright (with Eric Simonson), and Lucky Duck (with Bill Russell and Henry Kreiger). Hatcher wrote the book for the Broadway musical Never Gonna Dance and the musical, ELLA.

Hatcher is a member and/or alumnus of The Playwrights' Center, The Dramatists Guild of America, Writers Guild of America and New Dramatists.

== Work ==
=== Plays ===
- A Tale of Two Cities, 2027 (an adaptation of the Charles Dickens novel A Tale of Two Cities)
- Holmes/Poirot, 2024 (co-written with Steve Hendrickson; an adaptation of the Agatha Christie novel Murder on the Links, making the backstory of the mystery investigated by Hercule Poirot a case investigated by Sherlock Holmes. Premiered at the Park Square Theatre in St. Paul)
- Dial M for Murder, 2022 (an adaptation of the Frederick Knott play of the same name, premiered at the Old Globe Theatre in San Diego)
- The Alchemist, 2021 (an adaptation of the Ben Jonson play of the same name, premiered at The Red Bull Theatre in New York City)
- Holmes and Watson, 2018 (originally commissioned and produced by the Arizona Theatre Company)
- "Glensheen", 2015 premiered at History Theatre in Saint Paul, MN
- To Begin With, 2015 - revived in 2017 (an adaptation of The Life of Our Lord by Charles Dickens), premiered at the Music Box Theatre in Minneapolis and starred Gerald Charles Dickens
- No Name, 2014 (an adaptation of the Wilkie Collins novel, premiered at Carthage College, then Edinburgh Festival Fringe)
- Sherlock Holmes and the Adventure of the Suicide Club, 2011 (premiered at Arizona Theatre Company)
- Ten Chimneys, 2011
- Louder Faster, 2011 (co-authored with Eric Simonson, premiered at City Theatre)
- Bloody Radio Murders, 2010 (written for a MMW's drama club)
- Mrs. Mannerly, NY premiere 2010
- Cousin Bette, 2009, (an adaptation of Honoré de Balzac's La Cousine Bette)
- Dr. Jekyll & Mr. Hyde, 2008, (an adaptation of Robert Louis Stevenson's novella, using 4 actors to play the role of Mr. Hyde)
- The Government Inspector, 2008, (adapted from Nikolai Gogol)
- Armadale, 2007
- The Falls, 2006
- Korczak's Children, 2006
- Murderers, 2005
- A Picasso, 2005, (loosely inspired by actual events surrounding the Nazi persecution of "Degenerate art")
- Murder by Poe, 2003, (an adaptation of five stories by Edgar Allan Poe)
- Good 'n' Plenty, 2001
- Hanging Lord Haw Haw, 2000
- To Fool the Eye, 2000, (an adaptation of Jean Anouilh's Léocadia)
- Work Song: Three Views of Frank Lloyd Wright, 2000, with Eric Simonson
- Compleat Female Stage Beauty, 1999
- The Servant of Two Masters, 1999, with Emilo Paolo Landi (adaptation of the Goldoni commedia dell'arte play)
- Mother Russia, 1999
- Pierre, 1998, (adapted from Pierre: or the Ambiguities by Herman Melville)
- What Corbin Knew, 1998
- Smash, 1997 (an adaptation of George Bernard Shaw's Novel An Unsocial Socialist)
- The Turn of the Screw, 1996 (adaptation of the novella of the same name by Henry James)
- Miss Nelson is Missing!, 1996, (based on the book by Harry Allard and James Marshall)
- Scotland Road, 1993

=== Scripts ===
Film

- The Good Liar, 2019
- Mr. Holmes, 2015
- The Duchess, 2008
- Casanova, 2005 (co-writer)
- Stage Beauty, 2004

TV

- The Mentalist: Forest Green, 2014
- Upstairs, Downstairs: All the Things You Are, 2012
- Murder at the Cannes Film Festival, 2000
- Columbo: Ashes to Ashes, 1998

== Awards and nominations ==
- Edgar Award for Best Play for Dr. Jekyll and Mr. Hyde (nominated)
