= Magic/Bird =

Play written by Eric Simonson

- 2012 Playbill cover
- Original language: English
- Written by: Eric Simonson
- Characters: Larry Bird; Magic Johnson
- Genre: Drama

Premiere
- Place: Longacre Theatre, NYC
- Directed by: Thomas Kail

Magic/Bird (stylized sometimes as Magic-Bird and Magic Bird) is a play by Eric Simonson about basketball stars Magic Johnson of the Los Angeles Lakers and Larry Bird of the Boston Celtics throughout their careers. The play premiered on Broadway in 2012, where it ran for 61 total performances.

== Plot overview ==
Magic/Bird follows basketball stars Magic Johnson of the Los Angeles Lakers and Larry Bird of the Boston Celtics, their rise from college basketball to the NBA and super stardom, and eventually the Olympic Dream Team, their team and personal rivalries and ultimately their long-running friendship. According to the producers: "At the heart of one of the fiercest rivalries in sports, two of the greatest athletes of all-time battled for multiple championships and the future of their sport...Johnson and Bird, went head to head, electrified the nation, reinvigorated the NBA, and turned their rivalry into the greatest and most famous friendships in professional sports."

== Production history ==
Preview performances of Magic/Bird began on Broadway at the Longacre Theatre on March 21, 2012, with an official opening on April 11, 2012. Kevin Daniels starred as Magic Johnson and Tug Coker as Larry Bird. The cast featured, in multiple roles, Deirdre O'Connell (as Georgia Bird/Shelly/Patricia Moore), Peter Scolari (as Red Auerbach/Jerry Buss/Pat Riley), Rob Ray Manning Jr. (as Michael Cooper/Henry Alvarado/Frank) and Francois Battiste (as Jon Lennox/Ron Baxter/Willy).

Magic/Bird was produced by Fran Kirmser and Tony Ponturo, who had also produced Eric Simonson's other sports play Lombardi on Broadway. It was directed by Thomas Kail. David Korins was the set designer, Howell Binkley was the lighting designer, Paul Tazwell was the costume designer, and Nevin Steinberg was the sound designer. Projections were designed by Wendall K. Harrington. The production had the support of the National Basketball Association and the participation of Bird and Johnson.

The play closed on May 12, 2012, after 38 performances and 23 previews.

== Critical reception ==
Reviews for Magic/Bird were "not enthusiastic," and the play did not do well at the box office. It did not receive any Tony Award nominations.

== See also ==
- Magic & Bird: A Courtship of Rivals
