= Kevin Daniels =

American actor

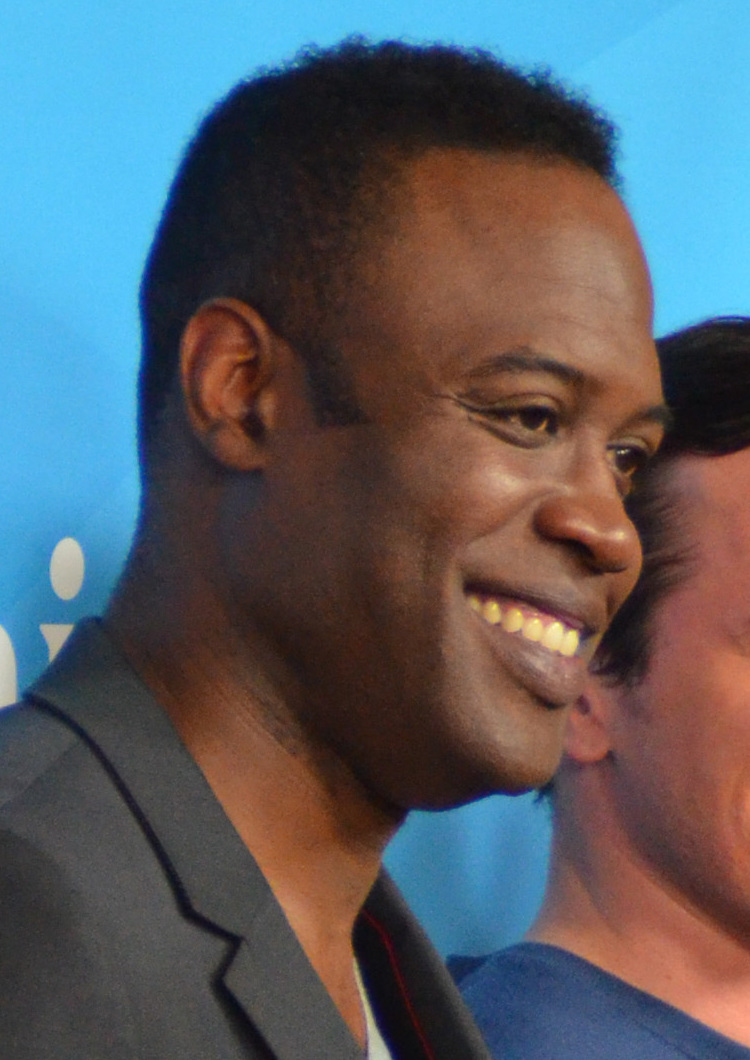
- Daniels in 2015
- Born: Kevin Dwight Daniels Jr. December 9, 1976 (age 49)
- Education: Juilliard School (BFA)
- Occupation: Actor
- Years active: 1998–present

Kevin Dwight Daniels Jr. (born December 9, 1976), is an American actor who started his career with a supporting role in the 1998 film Twelfth Night, or What You Will by director Nicholas Hytner. He has appeared in the film Hollywood Homicide, as well as the TV series Law & Order, Frasier, Chuck, House and Modern Family, the latter in the recurring role of Longines. He has since participated in more than 20 productions. He is best known for playing Don Miller, a firefighter for the Baltimore City Fire Department in the movie Ladder 49 and the USA show Sirens where he played Hank St. Clare, a Chicago EMT.

He starred in the 2012 Broadway play Magic/Bird playing the lead role of Magic Johnson.

Daniels attended the Juilliard School as a member of the Drama Division's Group 27 (1994–1998).

In 2023, Daniels joined ABC's police procedural series, Will Trent, as a recurring cast member in the role of Detective Franklin Wilks. In August 2025, he was promoted as a series regular for the show's fourth season.

== Personal life ==
Daniels is openly gay.

== Filmography ==
=== Film ===
Year	Title	Role	Notes
1998	Twelfth Night, or What You Will		
2001	Kate & Leopold	Doorman at Party	
2003	Hollywood Homicide	Cuz	
2004	Ladder 49	Don Miller	
2004	Neurotica		
2005	The Island	Censor	
2006	Broken	Franklin	Uncredited role
2007	And Then Came Love	Paul	
2013	Raze	Guard No. 5	
2013	McCanick	Undercover Tanktop	
2016	The Watcher	Reggie	
2019	The Chase	Luke	Short
2020	Typical Detective	Detective	
2021	Shelter in Place	Ty	
2024	Not Another Church Movie	Taylor Pherry and Madude Hims	

=== Television ===
Year	Title	Role	Notes
1998	Mad About You	Construction Worker No. 3	Episode: "Season Opener"
1998	Twelfth Night, or What You Will	Officer / Lord	TV movie
1999	Daria	Michael "Mack" Jordan MacKenzie Hank (voice)	4 episodes
2000	Deadline	Tyrell Jackson	Episode: "Pilot"
2001	Third Watch	Lieutenant 86	Episode: "Honor"
2000–2001	Law & Order	Chris Cody / Reporter No. 3	2 episodes
2002	In-Laws	Carl	Episode: "Love Thy Neighbor"
2002	Buffy the Vampire Slayer	Bouncer	Episode: "Sleeper"
2002	JAG	Lt. Cmdr Suttles	Episode: "All Ye Faithful"
2003	Frasier	Steve	Episode: "Farewell, Nervosa"
2003	Baby Bob	Doorman	Episode: "Don't Pass Me By"
2003	10-8: Officers on Duty	Detective Barrow	Episode: "Blood Sugar Sex Magik"
2005	Briar & Graves	N/A	Unsold TV pilot (Fox)
2005	Their Eyes Were Watching God	Liege Moss	TV movie
2005	Charmed	Rathbone	Episode: "Carpe Demon"
2006	Smallville	Greg Flynn	Episode: "Lockdown"
2006	Out of Practice	Bartender	Episode: "Restaurant Row"
2007	I'm With Stupid	Sheldon	TV movie
2008	This Can't Be My Life	Jason Marshals	Episode: "The Pink Pages"
2008	Brothers & Sisters	Sam	Episode: "The Missionary Implosion"
2010–2019	Modern Family	Longines	Recurring role (seasons 2–11), 12 episodes
2010	100 Questions	Sam	Episode: "Are You Romantic?"
2011	Chuck	Ellyas Abshir	Episode: "Chuck Versus the Family Volkoff"
2011	House	Caesar	Episode: "The Fix"
2011	Franklin & Bash	Officer Wiltern	Episode: "The Bangover"
2011	Big Time Rush	Speaking Police Officer	Episode: "Big Time Rocker"
2011	Bandwagon: The TV Series	Casting Director	Episode: "It's Your One Shot"
2011–2015	The Exes	Security Guard / Bouncer	2 episodes
2012	Castle	Reggie Blake	Episode: "Cloudy with a Chance of Murder"
2013	Justified	Mitch	Episode: "Money Trap"
2013	Wendell & Vinnie	Scott	Episode: "Pilot"
2014–2015	Sirens	Hank	Main role
2014	The Mentalist	Clancy Tatum	Episode: "Black Helicopters"
2014	One Christmas Eve	Reggie	TV movie
2015	Noches con Planatino	Himself	1 episode
2015–2016	Glimpses of Greg	Hector	2 episodes
2016	Single Minded	Guru	TV miniseries; Episode: "Dick Letter"
2016	Mom	Officer Bill	Episode: "Blow and a Free McMuffin"
2017	Trial & Error	Alfonzo Prefontaine	4 episodes
2017	Famous in Love	Ken Chapman	Episode: "Not So Easy A"
2017–2021	Atypical	Coach Briggs	8 episodes
2017	Scorpion	Detective Daniels	Episode: "Sci Hard"
2017	Hawaii Five-O	Detective Bullock	Episode: "I Ka Wa Ma Mua Hope, I Ka Wa Ma Hope"
2018	Champions	Leo	Episode: "Deal or No Deal"
2018	Suits	John Billows	Episode: "Sour Grapes"
2018	The Guest Book	Steve	Episode: "Under Cover"
2018–2019	The Orville	Locar	2 episodes
2018–2020	Coop & Cami Ask the World	Principal Walker	12 episodes
2019	Now Apocalypse	Barnabus	4 episodes
2019	What/If	John	Episode: "What Next"
2019	Why Women Kill	Lamar	4 episodes
2019	New Amsterdam	Marquis Cannon	Episode: "The Denominator"
2019	The Rookie	Officer Wilkie	Episode: "Safety"
2020	AJ & The Queen	Darrell	Episode: "Jackson"
2020	Council of Dads	Peter Richards	7 episodes
2021	The Big Leap	Wayne Fontaine	Series regular
2023–present	Will Trent	Franklin Wilks	13 episodes
2023–2024	Frasier	Tiny	6 episodes

=== Video games ===
Year	Title	Role
2011	NCIS Video Game	Watch Commander David Burch
2011	Call of Juarez: The Cartel	Additional Voices
2011	Dead Island	Titus, Various Characters
2013	Dead Island Riptide	Dr. Cecil, Various Characters
2015	Dying Light	Spike, Additional Voices
2016	Mafia III	Additional Voices

=== Stage ===
Year	Title	Role(s)	Venue	Ref.
1998	Twelfth Night	Officer	Lincoln Center Theater, Broadway	
2001	Up Against the Wind	Suge Knight	New York Theatre Workshop, Off-Broadway	
2004	Compromise	Thomas	Gloucester Stage Company, Boston	
2010	King Lear	Cornwall	Antaeus Theatre Company, Los Angeles	
2010	Calligraphy	performer	Los Angeles Theatre Center	
2012	Magic/Bird	Magic Johnson	Longacre Theatre, Broadway	
2013	One Night in Miami	Jim Brown	Rogue Machine Theatre, Los Angeles	
2016	Bull	Tony	Rogue Machine Theatre, Los Angeles	
2024	Monsters of the American Cinema	Remy	Rogue Machine Theatre, Los Angeles	
