= Keith Nobbs =

American actor (born 1979)

- Born: April 9, 1979 (age 46); U.S.
- Occupation: Actor

Keith Nobbs (born April 9, 1979) is an American stage, television, and film actor perhaps best known for his portrayal of Joey "Ice Cream" in the TV series The Black Donnellys.

== Life and career ==
A graduate of Fiorello H. LaGuardia High School of Music & Art and Performing Arts, Nobbs began working in professional theater in the 1998 production of Stupid Kids, directed by Michael Mayer. His Broadway debut was in the Roundabout Theatre Company production of The Lion In Winter starring Laurence Fishburne and Stockard Channing, also directed by Mayer. Other notable New York stage appearances include Hope Is the Thing With Feathers (Drama Dept.), Fuddy Meers (Manhattan Theatre Club), Free to Be... You and Me (The Drama Dept.), Dublin Carol (Atlantic Theater Company), The Hasty Heart (Keen Company), and the world premiere of David Mamet's Romance (Atlantic Theater Company) . For his performance in Four (Manhattan Theatre Club) Nobbs was nominated for the 2002 Drama Desk Award for Outstanding Featured Actor in a Play, and won the 2002 Lucille Lortel Award for Outstanding Featured Actor. His most recent stage appearance was in the Century Center for the Performing Arts production of Dog Sees God: Confessions of a Teenage Blockhead. Nobbs is a member of The Drama Department and the Vineyard Theatre Community of Artists. He appeared opposite Dan Lauria and Judith Light in the Broadway run of Lombardi.

Nobbs's television appearances include New York Undercover, The Sopranos, Law & Order, and Law & Order: Criminal Intent. His film credits include Double Whammy, Phone Booth, 25th Hour, and It Runs in the Family, as well as the independent films I Will Avenge You, Iago! and Premium. His latest film efforts include In Search Of, and HBO's The Pacific.

== Filmography ==
=== Television ===
- The Endgame (2022) as The Serial Skeptic
- Law & Order: Special Victims Unit (Episode: "Silent Night, Hateful Night" [2022] as Darko Pavic)
- Public Morals (2015) as Pat Duffy
- Person of Interest (Episode: "Mission Creep" [2011] as Straub)
- In Plain Sight (2010) as Charlie Connor
- The Pacific (2010) as Bud "Runner" Conley
- Law & Order: Special Victims Unit (Episode: "Sugar" [2009] as Ed)
- Fringe (Episode: "Unleashed" [2009] as Carl Bussler)
- Numb3rs (Episode: "Disturbed" [2009] as Ralph)
- The Black Donnellys (2007) as Joey Ice Cream
- Law & Order: Criminal Intent (Episode "The Good" [2006] as Kevin Colemar)
- Law & Order (Episode "Embedded" [2003] as Sgt. George Meacham)
- Law & Order (Episode "Missing" [2002] as Evan Tario)
- Law & Order (Episode: "All My Children" [2001] as Adam)
- The Sopranos (Episode "College" [1999] as Bowdoin Student)
- New York Undercover (Episode "Sign O' The Times" [1998] as Billy)

=== Cinema ===
- Muhammad Ali's Greatest Fight (2013) as Douglas's Clerk
- Weakness (2011) as Pete
- The Briefcase (2011) as Dan
- In Search Of (2008) as Andy
- Premium (2006) as Derick
- I Will Avenge You, Iago! (2005) as The Viewer
- It Runs in the Family (2003) as Stein
- 25th Hour (2002) as Luke
- Phone Booth (2002) as Adam
- Double Whammy (2001) as Duke

=== Theater ===
- The Legend of Georgia McBride (2015) Off-Broadway, MCC Theater - Rexy/Jason
- Bronx Bombers (2014) Broadway, Circle in the Square Theatre - Billy Martin
- Lombardi (2010) Broadway, Circle in the Square Theatre - Michael McCormick
- Three Sisters (2008) Williamstown Theater Festival - Baron Tuzenbach
- Dog Sees God: Confessions of a Teenage Blockhead (2005) Century Center for the Performing Arts - Van
- Romance (2005) Atlantic Theater Company - Bernard
- The Triple Happiness (2004) Second Stage Theatre - Mike
- Dublin Carol (2003) Atlantic Theater Company - Mark
- Free to Be... You and Me (2002) Drama Dept., Greenwich House Theatre - Actor
- Four (2002) Manhattan Theatre Club - June
- Fuddy Meers (1999) Manhattan Theatre Club - Kenny
- Hope is the Thing with Feathers (1998) Drama Dept., Greenwich House Theatre - Actor
- The Lion in Winter (1999) Broadway debut, Criterion Center Stage Right-Roundabout Theatre Company - John
- Stupid Kids (1998) Century Center for Performing Arts, WPA Theatre - John "Neechee" Crawford

== Awards and nominations ==
- 2002: Lucille Lortel Award for Four
- 2002: Drama Desk Award Nomination for Four
