= Lucinda Hawksley =

English biographer, author, lecturer and travel writer (born 1977)

Lucinda Hawksley (born 17 November 1977) is an English biographer, author, lecturer, and travel writer.

== Career ==
Hawksley studied literature and education before starting her career as a book editor. She took a Master of Arts in literature and the history of art and organised and curated an exhibition of the paintings of her relative Kate Dickens-Perugini in 2002 at the Charles Dickens Museum in London. She is an author, travel writer, lecturer and broadcaster.

Her books include biographies, social histories, art history and travel writing: Bitten by Witch Fever, Thames & Hudson, 2016; Charles Dickens and his Circle, NPG, 2016; A London Treasury, Andre Deutsch, 2015; Queen Victoria’s Mysterious Daughter: A Biography of Princess Louise, Thomas Dunne (NYC) 2015; A Victorian Treasury, Andre Deutsch, 2015; Moustaches, Whiskers & Beards, NPG, 2014; The Mystery of Princess Louise: Queen Victoria’s Rebellious Daughter, Chatto, 2013; March, Women, March: Voices of the Women’s Movement, Andre Deutsch, 2013; What Makes Great Art, Quintessence, 2012 (co-authored with artist Andy Pankhurst); Charles Dickens, Andre Deutsch, 2011; 50 British Artists You Should Know, Prestel, 2011; Katey: The Life and Loves of Dickens’s Artist Daughter, Doubleday, 2006; Lizzie Siddal: The Tragedy of a Pre-Raphaelite Supermodel, Andre Deutsch, 2004; A Tale of Two Cities, retold for children, Usborne, 2002; Essential Pre-Raphaelites, Dempsey Parr, 1999; London, Siena, 1999.

Lizzie Siddal: The Tragedy of a Pre-Raphaelite Supermodel was Book of the Week on BBC Radio 4 in 2004. Her co-authored works include the 19th and early 20th-century sections of 'The Essential History of Art' (2000) and 'An Encyclopedia of British History' (2001); 501 Great Artists, (Quintet Publishing, 2008); 1001 Paintings You Must See Before You Die (Quintet Publishing, 2006); Eyewitness Art (Dorling Kindersley, 2006); Europe 2006 (Bradmans Business Travel Guides, 2005), The History of the Bra (Studio Cactus, 2004); Europe 2005 (Bradmans Business Travel Guides, 2004); An Encyclopaedia of British History (Star Fire, 2001); Essential History of Art (Dempsey Parr, 2000); Essential van Gogh (Dempsey Parr, 2000) and Essential Michelangelo (Dempsey Parr, 2000). Hawksley's Essential Pre-Raphaelites (1999) has become a best seller and led to an invitation to lecture on 'Pre-Raphaelite Artists: The Connection Between Their Lives and Work' at the Oxford Union.

As a speaker and lecturer she has spoken at the International Charles Dickens Conference, the Newberry Library in Chicago, the National Portrait Gallery in London, the University of Genoa, the Kensington Hilton in London, the Fitzwilliam Museum in Cambridge; the Chicago Dickens Holiday Festival, the Dickens on the Strand festival in Galveston, Texas; Washington & Lee University, VA; Santa Fe College, FL; Arkansas State University; Southwestern University, TX; the University of Kolkata; the British Council in India; and the Free Library in Philadelphia, PA; as well as many other art galleries, universities and libraries around the world.

In December 2007 she appeared as herself in the BBC docudrama Charles Dickens & the Invention of Christmas, written and presented by Griff Rhys Jones. She also appeared in Channel 4's 2008 documentary Dickens's Secret Lover, which was concerned with Dickens's relationship with the actress Ellen Ternan. In December 2011 she appeared on BBC One's Songs of Praise and for BBC Two in Mrs Dickens' Family Christmas, during which she was interviewed by Sue Perkins. In January 2013 she appeared in all three episodes of BBC Two's Queen Victoria's Children and in an episode of Find My Past which was concerned with the affair between Charles Dickens and Ellen Ternan. She has appeared twice on BBC One's The One Show, interviewed about Lizzie Siddal and about Charles Dickens's will. She was the presenter for BBC One's Inside Out London: Dickens and Health. Her radio appearances include The Today Programme (BBC Radio 4); Woman's Hour (BBC Radio 4); The Aled Jones Show (BBC Radio 2); The Robert Elms Show (BBC London); The Lynn Parsons Show (Smooth Radio and BBC Berkshire); Glad To Be Grey with Mary Beard (BBC Radio 4) and Behind the Looking Glass with Lauren Laverne (BBC Radio 4). In 2013, Hawksley unveiled a new blue plaque to her great-great-great-grandfather, at 22 Cleveland Street, London.

She is a patron of the Charles Dickens Museum and lives in London. She is a member of the Management Committee of the Society of Authors (2014–2017), and Royal Literary Fund Fellow (2015–2017). In 2017, she was appointed to be a Fellow of the Royal Society of Arts. In December 2022, she appeared in Miriam's Dickensian Christmas on the UK's Channel 4 with Miriam Margolyes.

== Family ==
She is the great-great-great-granddaughter of Victorian novelist Charles Dickens and his wife, Catherine. Hawksley is the cousin of actor Harry Lloyd and actor and performer Gerald Dickens.

== Select publications ==
- Elizabeth Revealed (Historic Royal Palaces, 2018) ISBN 9781785511813
- Charles Dickens and Christmas (Pen and Sword, Nov 2017) ISBN 9781526712264
- Bitten by Witch Fever (Thames & Hudson, 2016) ISBN 9780500518380
- Charles Dickens and his Circle (NPG, 2016) ISBN 9781855145962
- A London Treasury (Andre Deutsch, 2015) ISBN 9780233004822
- Queen Victoria’s Mysterious Daughter: A Biography of Princess Louise (Thomas Dunne (NYC) 2015) ISBN 1250059321
- A Victorian Treasury (Andre Deutsch, 2015) ISBN 9780233004778
- Moustaches, Whiskers & Beards (NPG, 2014) ISBN 9781855144934
- The Mystery of Princess Louise: Queen Victoria’s Rebellious Daughter (Chatto, 2013) ISBN 0701183497
- March, Women, March: Voices of the Women’s Movement (Andre Deutsch, 2013) ISBN 9780233004457
- What Makes Great Art (Quintessence, 2012) (co-authored with artist Andy Pankhurst) ISBN 9780711235076
- Charles Dickens Published by Andre Deutsch Ltd, (2011) ISBN 0233003290
- Katey: The Life and Loves of Dickens's Artist Daughter Published by Doubleday, (2006) ISBN 0-385-60742-3
- Lizzie Siddal: Face of the Pre-Raphaelites Published by Walker & Co., (2006) ISBN 0-8027-1550-8
- Essential Michelangelo by Kirsten Bradbury and Lucinda Hawksley Published by Parragon, (2001) ISBN 0-7525-5147-7
- Endangered Animals by Lucinda Hawksley and Michael Posen Published by Parragon, (2000) ISBN 0-7525-3498-X
- Essential Pre-Raphaelites Published by Dempsey Parr, (1999) ISBN 1-84084-524-4
- The Magic & Mystery of Scotland by Lucinda Hawksley and Dennis Hardley Published by Barnes & Noble Books, (1999) ISBN 0-7607-1367-7
- London by Lucinda Hawksley and Allan Stone Published by Mustard, (1999) ISBN 0-7525-2928-5
- Queen Victoria's Mysterious Daughter: A Biography of Princess Louise, Thomas Dunne Books, (2015) ISBN 9781250059321

== See also ==
- Dickens family
