= Baby Makes Five =

- Genre: Sitcom
- Created by: Sy Rosen
- Starring: Peter Scolari; Louise Williams; Andre Gower; Emily Moultrie; Brandy Gold; Janis Paige; Priscilla Morrill
- Theme music composer: Harriet Schock
- Composer: Misha Segal
- Country of origin: United States
- Original language: English
- No. of seasons: 1
- No. of episodes: 5

Production
- Executive producer: Mort Lachman
- Producers: Sy Rosen; Douglas Arango; Phil Doran
- Running time: 30 minutes
- Production company: Alan Landsburg Productions

Original release
- Network: ABC
- Release: April 1 – April 29, 1983

Baby Makes Five is an American sitcom television series starring Peter Scolari. The series premiered April 1, 1983 on ABC.

== Plot ==
Eddie (Scolari) is an accountant who married to Jennie (Louise Williams) and the father of three children, with twins on the way. Jennie's mother (Janis Paige) was free-spirited, while Eddie's mother (Priscilla Morrill) was staid and conservative. Laura Riddle marked the first screen appearance for Jenny Lewis, and Annie Riddle was played by Brandy Gold, sibling of other 1980's sitcom stars Tracey and Missy Gold.

== Cast ==
- Peter Scolari as Eddie Riddle
- Louise Williams as Jennie Riddle
- Andre Gower as Michael Riddle
- Jenny Lewis (Note: in Pilot) / Emily Moultrie as Laura Riddle
- Brandy Gold as Annie Riddle
- Janis Paige as Blanche Riddle
- Priscilla Morrill as Edna Kearney

== US TV ratings ==
Season	Episodes	Start date	End date	Nielsen rank	Nielsen rating
1982-83	5	April 1, 1983	April 29, 1983	63	N/A

== Episodes ==
No.	Title	Directed by	Written by	Original release date	Prod. code
1	"Pilot"	Tom Trbovich	Sy Rosen	April 1, 1983	100
2	"Eddie's Night Out"	Jim Drake	Harriett Weiss	April 8, 1983	102
3	"Jennie Gets a Job"	Jim Drake	E. Michael Weinstein	April 15, 1983	101
4	"Matchmakers"	Lila Garrett	Robert Van Scoyk	April 22, 1983	103
5	"Jennie's Old Flame"	Russ Petranto	Phil Doran & Douglas Arango	April 29, 1983	104
