= Susan Raab Simonson =

American actress

- Born: Susan Raab; May 1, 1969; Greenbrae, California, U.S.
- Died: November 27, 2006 (aged 37); Marin County, California, U.S.
- Occupations: Actress, producer
- Years active: 1999–2006
- Spouse: Eric Simonson
- Children: 1
- Parent(s): Joan & Robert Raab

Susan Raab Simonson (May 1, 1969 – November 27, 2006) was an American stage actress and theatre producer.

== Career ==
For seven years, she was as associate producer for L.A. Theatre Works, working on its nationally syndicated radio series "The Play's the Thing", and on more than 80 plays for the group, among them a popular radio production of Annabelle Gurwitch's Fired!

Before that, she had been an actress and had worked for The Actors' Gang in Los Angeles.

== Personal life ==
She married director Eric Simonson in 2004; they had one son.

== Death ==
She was diagnosed with breast cancer the day after her husband won the 2005 Academy Award for Short Subject Documentary. She died eight months later, aged 37, in Marin County. A memorial service was held at St. Anselm Church in Ross, California.
