= Chicken & Biscuits (play) =

2021 play by Douglas Lyons

Chicken and Biscuits
- Written by: Douglas Lyons

Premiere
- Date premiered: February 28, 2020
- Place premiered: Queens Theatre in the Park

Chicken & Biscuits is a play by Douglas Lyons that made its Broadway debut in 2021 at the Circle in the Square Theatre. The comedy's planned four-month run was cut short due to the challenges surrounding the COVID-19 pandemic. Lyons made his Broadway debut as a playwright ten years after he did so as an actor in The Book of Mormon. The fall 2021 featured seven other Black playwrights, a Broadway record, and Zhailon Levingston was Broadway's youngest Black director.

The Broadway production starred Norm Lewis and Michael Urie in the story of a New Haven pastor's funeral that was disrupted by family drama.

Prior to its Broadway engagement, Chicken & Biscuits debuted at the Queens Theatre in the Park on February 28, 2020, and was the latter's first Broadway transfer.
