= Work Song: Three Views of Frank Lloyd Wright =

2000 play by Jeffrey Hatcher and Eric Simonson

- Original language: English
- Written by: Eric Simonson; Jeffrey Hatcher

Premiere
- Date: September 9, 2000
- Place: Milwaukee Repertory Theater

Work Song: Three Views of Frank Lloyd Wright is a play in three acts by Jeffrey Hatcher and Eric Simonson. It premiered at the Milwaukee Repertory Theater in 2000. The play was commissioned by the Steppenwolf Theatre Company of Chicago.

The play explores the relationship between Wright's personal life and work. The ensemble portrays more than a dozen people who were important in Wright's eventful life. The work is populated by architect Louis Sullivan, friends Ayn Rand and Alexander Woollcott, son John Lloyd Wright, wives Catherine and Olgivanna, and paramour Mamah Cheney.

== Productions ==
Work Song premiered at Milwaukee Repertory Theater's Quadracci Powerhouse Theater in September 2000. Co-author Eric Simonson directed Lee. E. Ernst as Wright.
