= Eric Simonson =

American dramatist (born 1960)

- Born: June 27, 1960 (age 66); Milwaukee, Wisconsin
- Occupations: American playwright and stage director
- Notable work: Work Song: Three Views of Frank Lloyd Wright; A Note of Triumph: The Golden Age of Norman Corwin

Eric Simonson (born June 27, 1960, in Milwaukee, Wisconsin) is an American writer and director in theatre, film and opera. He is a member of Steppenwolf Theatre in Chicago, and the author of plays Lombardi, Fake, Honest, Magic/Bird and Bronx Bombers. He won the 2005 Academy Award for his short documentary A Note of Triumph: The Golden Age of Norman Corwin, and was nominated for a Tony Award for Best Direction of a Musical in 1993 for The Song of Jacob Zulu.

== Personal life ==
Simonson was born in Milwaukee but grew up on a farm in the small town of Eagle. After graduating with a B.A. in theatre from Lawrence University, he moved to Madison, Wisconsin for a short period, where he worked with the then fledgling Ark Repertory Theatre. He moved to Chicago in 1983, where he helped found Lifeline Theatre, and eventually worked with the Steppenwolf Theatre Company. He became a member of the theatre's ensemble in 1993.

He holds the distinction of being one of only a handful of directors who has received Tony, Emmy and Oscar nominations.

Simonson now lives in Los Angeles, but often works throughout the United States. In 2004 he married theatre producer Susan Raab; she died of breast cancer in 2006, aged 37. They had one child, Henry Simonson. In 2013, Simonson married actress Sue Cremin.

== Career ==
Simonson is the writer (with Jeffrey Hatcher) of Work Song: Three Views of Frank Lloyd Wright, which was commissioned by Steppenwolf Theatre Company and Milwaukee Repertory Theater, and was subsequently produced across the United States. His film A Note of Triumph: The Golden Age of Norman Corwin won the 2005 Academy Award for Short Subject Documentary. That film also received a nomination from the International Documentary Association (IDA) for Distinguished Achievement. Other recent films include the documentary Studs Terkel: Listening to America (Emmy nomination) and On Tiptoe: Gentle Steps to Freedom (Oscar nomination, IDA Award, Emmy nomination). All three films subsequently aired on HBO/CINEMAX. Other films include Hamlet (co-directed with Campbell Scott) for Hallmark Entertainment, and the independent feature, Topa Topa Bluffs. Simonson has also written and developed multiple television series for HBO, FX, USA, TNT and STARZ networks.

In 2007 he was invited to join the Academy of Motion Picture Arts and Sciences.

He also directed the premiere of Ricky Ian Gordon and Michael Korie's opera The Grapes of Wrath at Minnesota Opera in 2007, and, in 2011, the premiere of Kevin Puts and Mark Campbell's "Silent Night", which won the Pulitzer Prize in music. Other opera directing credits include the North American premiere of "The Handmaid's Tale."

His recent plays, Lombardi/The Only Thing (Madison Repertory Theatre), Carter's Way (Steppenwolf Theatre) and Slaughterhouse-Five (Godlight Theatre of New York) received premieres in 2008. Honest premiered at Carthage College in 2009 and was then part of Steppenwolf Theatre Company's 5th Annual First Look Repertory of New Work. The Carthage Theatre production, the first commission of their New Play Initiative, traveled to the 2010 American College Theatre Festival (Region 3). Simonson's play Lombardi ran on Broadway from October 2010 to May 2011. In 2018, Simonson was invited back to Carthage College to create the tenth play in their New Play Initiative. That play, Up and Away, also traveled to the 2019 Edinburgh Festival Fringe and the 2019 Region 3 American College Theatre Festival.

Simonson's Louder Faster, co-authored with Jeffrey Hatcher, premiered at City Theatre in Pittsburgh in May 2011. His play, Magic/Bird, premiered on Broadway in March 2012.

His play, Bronx Bombers, about the New York Yankees, opened Off-Broadway on September 20, 2013, and closed on October 19 in a Primary Stages production. The play opened on Broadway on January 19, 2014 (previews), officially on February 6 at the Circle in the Square Theatre, starring Peter Scolari and Tracy Shayne.

== Work ==
=== Plays ===
- Bang the Drum Slowly (adaptation) - 1992
- Nomathemba (w/ Ntozake Shange and Joseph Shabalala) - 1995
- Work Song: Three Views of Frank Lloyd Wright (with Jeffrey Hatcher) - 2000
- Moby Dick (adaptation) - 2006
- The Only Thing - 2007
- Carter’s Way - 2008
- Speak English - 2008
- Fake - 2009
- Honest - 2009
- Lombardi (based on the book When Pride Still Mattered by David Maramiss) - 2010
- Louder Faster (w/ Jeffrey Hatcher) - 2012
- Magic/Bird - 2012
- Bronx Bombers - 2014
- The Incredible Season of Ronnie Rabinovitz - 2014
- Up and Away - 2018

=== Films ===
- Hamlet (TV Movie) - 2000
- Ladies Room L.A. (Short) - 2000
- On Tiptoe: Gentle Steps to Freedom (Short documentary) - 2000
- On Tiptoe: The Music of Ladysmith Black Mambazo (Documentary) - 2000
- Topa Topa Bluffs - 2002
- A Note of Triumph: The Golden Age of Norman Corwin (Documentary short) - 2005
- Studs Terkel: Listening to America (TV Movie documentary short) - 2014
- Killing Reagan (TV Movie) - 2016

=== Operas ===
- The Fix, libretto, 2019 (Based on the Black Sox Scandal)
