= Lombardi (play) =

Play written by Eric Simonson

- Original Broadway windowcard
- Written by: Eric Simonson
- Characters: Vince Lombardi; Marie Lombardi; Michael McCormick; Paul Hornung; Dave Robinson; Jim Taylor

Premiere
- Place: Circle in the Square Theatre, New York City
- Official website

Lombardi is a play by Eric Simonson, based on the book When Pride Still Mattered: A Life of Vince Lombardi by Pulitzer Prize-winning author David Maraniss.

== Synopsis ==
The play follows Green Bay Packers coach Vince Lombardi through a week in the 1965 NFL season as he attempts to lead his team to the championship. (The Packers won the NFL championship that year, which would be the last season before the introduction of the Super Bowl.) A "Look Magazine" reporter, Michael McCormick, wants to "find out what makes Lombardi win". However, players on the team refuse to be interviewed, wary of giving up information. He goes instead to Lombardi's wife, Marie, for answers. Meanwhile, in a flashback, Lombardi frets over his lack of promotion and contemplates quitting football. His wife reveals that the family had an emotional move to Green Bay, Wisconsin when Lombardi joined the Packers.

Lombardi ends up yelling at Michael in front of the team, prompting both to storm off. Linebacker and place kicker Dave Robinson comforts Michael at a local bar, sharing stories about his initial impressions of the coach, the "honor of being barked at" by Lombardi, and the equality established on the team. After more positive insight from running back, option quarterback and kicker Paul Hornung and fullback Jim Taylor, Michael decides to attend the next game. As he narrates what happened at the game, the Packers win.

After he writes his news story, Michael reveals to Lombardi that he is quitting "Look Magazine" to form his own publishing company. Lombardi congratulates him on his move to independence and celebrates the win with Michael and Marie. Michael realizes that Lombardi is "the most imperfect, perfect man" he ever met.

== Original Broadway cast ==
- Dan Lauria as Vince Lombardi
- Judith Light as Marie Lombardi
- Keith Nobbs as Michael McCormick
- Bill Dawes as Paul Hornung
- Robert Christopher Riley as Dave Robinson
- Chris Sullivan as Jim Taylor

== History and background ==
The Broadway production of Lombardi was conceived by Fran Kirmser and produced by Kirmser and Tony Ponturo. Kirmser and Ponturo met with David Maraniss to base the play on his book When Pride Still Mattered. Maraniss introduced Kirmser and Ponturo to Eric Simonson who was them contracted to write the original play.

Simonson created an earlier version of the play entitled Lombardi: The Only Thing, which was produced in 2007 by the Madison Repertory Theatre at the Overture Center in Madison, Wisconsin. The play then had a successful run at the Next Act Theatre in Milwaukee in 2008. After some interest surfaced in a Lombardi play for Broadway, Simonson "developed an entirely new play leaving only one five-minute scene from the original script."

== Productions ==
=== Great Barrington (2010) ===
The production had a pre-Broadway tryout at the Mahaiwe Performing Arts Center in Great Barrington, Massachusetts, playing from July 22 to July 28, 2010. The production featured Dan Lauria and Judith Light as Vince and Marie Lombardi, respectively.

=== Broadway (2010–2011) ===
Lombardi officially premiered on Broadway at the Circle in the Square Theatre on October 21, 2010, after previews beginning on September 23. The creative team includes direction by Thomas Kail, sets by David Korins, costumes by Paul Tazewell, and lighting by Howell Binkley. The production was produced by Tony Ponturo and Fran Kirmser. Lombardi closed on May 22, 2011, after 30 previews and 244 performances.

Due to the Packers winning Super Bowl XLV in 2011, their fourth Super Bowl but their second since Lombardi was head coach, the show's producers were "hoping for a halo effect at the box office." Patrick Healy wrote in The New York Times: "The Packers’ victory on Sunday lent "Lombardi" plenty of visibility before and after the Fox broadcast of the game. One FOX commentator, Oakland/Los Angeles Raiders Hall of Fame defensive end Howie Long, who had seen the play, talked up the play before kickoff and during the postgame show he said, 'I think Lombardi the play just got an extension on Broadway.' " Healy also wrote that the show had not recouped its $3 million investment, and while producer Tony Ponturo said that the show was scheduled to run until June 19, 2011, it ended its run early. Producers would not comment on whether or not the play had earned back its production budget.

The original Broadway cast included Dan Lauria as Vince Lombardi, Judith Light as Marie Lombardi, Keith Nobbs as Michael McCormick, Bill Dawes as Paul Hornung, Robert Christopher Riley as Dave Robinson, and Chris Sullivan as Jim Taylor. Light was nominated for a 2011 Tony Award for Best Performance by a Featured Actress in a Play for her performance in Lombardi.

=== Milwaukee (2011) ===
The regional premiere of Lombardi began in Milwaukee, Wisconsin at the Milwaukee Repertory Theater. The production starred Lee E. Ernst as Vince Lombardi and ran from October 11, 2011 to November 13, 2011. Simonson said in a statement, "I grew up in Wisconsin, so [Lombardi] was always a part of the ether. When I started doing a play on him, it was not just to recount a famous man's life story, it was really to find out and unearth the reasons why this man was famous. He's a fully dimensional man, a complicated man, more complex than people realize."

=== Fish Creek (2012) ===
Lombardi continued its professional run in Wisconsin at Peninsula Players Theatre in Fish Creek (Door County) September 5, 2012, to October 14, 2012. Fish Creek, Wisconsin, is 70 miles north of Green Bay.

== Response ==
The show received mixed reviews from New York critics, garnering a "B+" rating on StageGrade. Charles Isherwood said the show "seems to depend heavily on a playbook that emphasizes the importance of team effort. In examining the life of the title character . . . this workmanlike drama often keeps him offstage for long stretches, almost relegating Lombardi to a supporting role in his own story."

Most critics were in consensus that Lauria's performance was the highlight of the show. Variety's Marilyn Stasio emphasized that "[Lauria] brings that endearing quality to his scrappy portrait of Lombardi . . . Working off his own bulldog physique and gap-toothed grin, Lauria achieves an eerie physical resemblance to Lombardi, who used his whole body to speak his mind." However, The New Yorker added that "Lauria would do well to tone down the yelling."

The response from the football community has been very positive. The 2010 Broadway premiere was attended by NFL commissioner Roger Goodell, Packers president Mark Murphy and New York Giants president John Mara (son of Wellington Mara, who was Giants co-owner when Lombardi was the Giants' offensive coordinator), as well as Susan Lombardi – daughter of Vince and Marie – and a number of Lombardi's former players. The real-life Dave Robinson spoke of getting chills and feeling as if he were back in Green Bay when Lauria as Lombardi turned and looked at him in the audience, while the real-life Jim Taylor was also present and guard Jerry Kramer was seen in tears at the end. Goodell and Long hosted a special performance the month after the premiere to benefit the NFL's Player Care foundation, providing support to retired players in need. Lauria also played Lombardi in NFL Network promotional material for the 2010-11 NFL Playoffs, including Super Bowl XLV.

== Awards and nominations ==
=== Original Broadway production ===
Year	Award	Category	Nominee	Result
2011	Tony Awards	Best Featured Actress in a Play	Judith Light	Nominated

== See also ==
- Lombardi (film)
