= Circle in the Square Theatre =

Broadway theater in Manhattan, New York

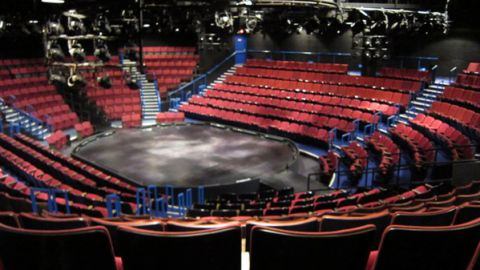
- Interactive map of Circle in the Square Theatre
- Address: 235 West 50th Street; Manhattan, New York; United States
- Coordinates: 40.7621°N 73.9848°W
- Owner: Paramount Group
- Operator: Circle in the Square
- Capacity: 776 (Note: This capacity is approximate and may vary depending on the show.)
- Type: Broadway
- Production: Just in Time

Construction
- Built: 1969–1972
- Opened: November 15, 1972 (53 years ago)
- Architects: Alan Sayles, Jules Fisher (consultant)

The Circle in the Square Theatre (colloquially the Circle) is a Broadway theater at 235 West 50th Street, within the basement of Paramount Plaza, in the Midtown Manhattan neighborhood of New York City, New York, U.S. The current Broadway theater, completed in 1972, is the successor of an off-Broadway theater of the same name, co-founded around 1950 by a group that included Theodore Mann and José Quintero. The Broadway venue was designed by Allen Sayles; it originally contained 650 seats and uses a thrust stage that extends into the audience on three sides. The theater had 776 seats as of 2026.

The Circle in the Square Theatre was named for its first location at 5 Sheridan Square in Greenwich Village, which opened in February 1951 and was operated as a theater in the round. During the 1950s and 1960s, the theater became what Women's Wear Daily described as the "center of Off-Broadway". The Sheridan Square theater was closed temporarily between 1954 and 1955 and was demolished in 1960. The company then moved to 159 Bleecker Street, known as Circle in the Square Downtown; that location continued to operate until about 1995. In addition to its Sheridan Square and Bleecker Street locations, the Circle hosted shows at other locations such as Ford's Theatre and the Henry Miller's Theatre.

The Gershwin Theatre and the Circle in the Square's Broadway theater were built as part of Paramount Plaza (originally known as the Uris Building). The Circle opened its Broadway theater on November 15, 1972, and operated as a nonprofit subscription-supported producing house for the next 25 years. The theater typically presented three or four shows per year in the 1970s and 1980s, but, by the 1990s, the theater had a $1.5 million deficit. Following an unsuccessful attempt to appoint new leadership in 1994, the company filed for bankruptcy in 1997. The theater reopened in 1999, now operating as an independent commercial receiving house. The Circle in the Square Theatre School, a drama school within Paramount Plaza, is associated with the Circle in the Square Theatre.

== Design ==
The Circle in the Square Theatre (colloquially known as the Circle) is in the basement of Paramount Plaza in the Midtown Manhattan neighborhood of New York City, New York, U.S. It was designed by Allen Sayles, with a lighting system designed by Jules Fisher. The Circle in the Square theatrical company operates its own venue, which was originally known as the Circle in the Square–Joseph E. Levine Theatre. It is one of Paramount Plaza's two theaters, the other being the much larger Gershwin Theatre on the second floor. Paramount Plaza's two venues, along with the Minskoff and American Place theaters, were constructed under the Special Theater District amendment of 1967 as a way to give their respective developers additional floor area. The space is accessed via escalators from street level, as well as via stairs.

The theater was built with a capacity of 650 seats; as of 2026, the theater has 776 seats. The space was originally meant as an off-Broadway house with fewer than 500 seats, but the Circle's artistic director Theodore Mann and its managing director Paul Libin increased the capacity by relocating columns and replaced steps with ramps. Originally, the theater was decorated with red seats, and it had a red-and-gray carpet in a checkerboard pattern. The Circle's symbol, a cube, was incorporated into the design of the carpet and the light. The top of the auditorium contains soundproof panels, which minimized noise from police horses when the theater opened. A soundproof control booth was placed at the rear of the auditorium.

The Circle contains a thrust stage, with seats surrounding it on three sides, similar to the venue's off-Broadway predecessors. It is one of two Broadway houses with a thrust stage; the other is Lincoln Center's Vivian Beaumont Theater. Because of the stage's unconventional design, theatrical critics negatively reviewed it, while directors had difficulty staging productions there. Conversely, the design allowed the audience to be extremely close to the stage, as there were only ten rows of seats. According to Mann, the design of the current Circle in the Square was based on the predecessor theaters. These, in turn, were based on a recommendation from theater critic Brooks Atkinson, who had told Mann: "When you walk in the door, you should see the stage—that should predominate—not the audience."

== Off-Broadway predecessors ==
The Circle in the Square was founded by Theodore Mann, José Quintero, Jason Wingreen, Aileen Cramer, Emily Stevens, and Edward Mann, all of whom were members of the Loft Players. (Note: Edward Mann and Theodore Mann were not related.) The theater's founders were in their mid-20s and were described by The New York Times as having "little training, less experience, and no reputation in the theater". Sources disagree on when the organization was founded, but it may have been established in 1949 or 1950. The founding team wished to establish a "center dedicated to the development and presentation of all the arts". The team could not afford to open their theater in Manhattan's high-rent Theater District. Upon the recommendation of Mann's father Martin M. Goldman, the team opted for a location in Greenwich Village, which had a myriad of empty theaters.

During the 1950s and 1960s, the theater became what Women's Wear Daily described as the "center of Off-Broadway", largely staging revivals at a time when traditional Broadway theaters presented experimental shows. Mel Gussow of The New York Times similarly described the original Circle as being within "the heartbeat of Off-Broadway" in Sheridan Square. Over the years, actors such as Colleen Dewhurst, Geraldine Page, Jason Robards, Bradford Dillman, Dustin Hoffman, George Segal, George C. Scott, and James Earl Jones starred in the company's productions. In addition, the theater attracted such directors as Michael Cacoyannis, William Ball, and Alan Arkin. The Circle tended to stage productions by well-known playwrights such as Tennessee Williams, Eugene O'Neill, Jean Giraudoux, Dylan Thomas, and Jules Feiffer.

=== 5 Sheridan Square ===
The first Circle in the Square Theatre was at 5 Sheridan Square (also known as the Greenwich Village Inn), a former nightclub in Greenwich Village. The Circle's founders signed a 10-year lease on the building. When the team signed the lease in 1951, they had $320 between them, including $300 that they had earned from operating a summer theater in Woodstock, New York. The Circle's founders raised $7,500, and Goldman formed Onyx Restaurants Inc. to lease the inn on behalf of the team, which was responsible for paying $1,000 a month in rent. The inn occupied a pair of brownstone residences. The first-floor living and dining rooms in one of the residences had been converted to a rectangular dance floor, while the three stories above the dance floor included 15 rooms. There was a bar in the rear of the dance floor, as well as a kitchen in the basement. Due to the inn's configuration, the theater's founders decided to operate the Circle as a theater in the round, wherein the audience surrounded the stage (a converted dance floor). The theater, and the eponymous company, derived their name from the facility's layout and its location at Sheridan Square.

The theater was planned to open in November 1950, but the opening was delayed by two and a half months due to difficulties in securing a theatrical license. Ultimately, the Circle's founders were only allowed a cabaret license. The theater's first production was the play Dark of the Moon, which opened in February 1951. At the time, the off-Broadway industry was still relatively obscure and was not covered by mainstream newspapers. Mann, Quintero, and all actors were paid a flat salary of $20 per week. The Circle became more popular after theatrical critic Brooks Atkinson praised the Circle's production of Williams's Summer and Smoke in 1952. Mann said Atkinson's review prompted guests to line up for tickets during July, at a time when theaters traditionally closed in the summer due to a lack of air conditioning. Quintero directed some of the theater's most popular early productions, including The Grass Harp, American Gothic, and O'Neill's The Iceman Cometh and Long Day's Journey into Night. Notwithstanding the success of Summer and Smoke, the theater lost money during its first several years.

City officials closed the 5 Sheridan Square location in March 1954 because the venue did not comply with fire-safety regulations and because the space was only licensed as a cabaret. At the time, the Circle was described as one of the "most popular Off-Broadway theaters". During the 1954–1955 season, the Circle temporarily relocated to Broadway houses such as the 48th Street Theatre and the 46th Street Theatre. After Mann filed plans to renovate the theater in April 1955, city officials approved the theater's reopening. When the venue reopened on June 1, 1955, it was rebranded as the Circle in the Square Cabaret. It continued to host popular theatrical performances, such as Cradle Song, Children of Darkness, and Our Town. In July 1959, Mann, Quintero, and Leigh Connell announced that they had to relocate by that October because the building's owner was planning to redevelop the site. At the time of the announcement, the Circle had presented 18 shows, mostly revivals of plays, at 5 Sheridan Square. The old location remained open until January 8, 1960, and the inn was demolished the same year.

=== 159 Bleecker Street ===
At the end of August 1959, Mann, Quintero, and Connell leased space at 159 Bleecker Street in Greenwich Village, which at the time was occupied by the Amato Opera Company. The structure had been constructed in 1917 and had been used for various purposes over the years, including a movie theater. Starting in October 1959, the group rebuilt the space as a circle-in-the-round theater, similar in arrangement to the original location. To comply with Off-Broadway regulations, the theater had 199 seats. Unlike the Sheridan Square location, the Bleecker Street theater had adequate space for dressing rooms. The newer space had higher ceilings, and it did not have support columns that obstructed patrons' views, as the Sheridan Square theater did. The new location, known as Circle in the Square Downtown, opened on January 9, 1960, with Our Town; the play's cast had given their last performance at 5 Sheridan Square the day before. The first new production at the Bleecker Street location, was a revival of Jean Genet's The Balcony which opened the same year.

By the early 1960s, the Circle had staged several box-office flops and was in debt. Nonetheless, upon the theater's tenth anniversary in 1961, the New York Herald Tribune reported that Mann and Quintero were purchasing the Bleecker Street building, at a time when Off-Broadway theaters were in high demand. Quintero had directed 17 of the Circle's 21 plays at that point. Ultimately, Quintero decided to resign from the Circle by 1963, preferring to work as a freelance producer. Paul Libin was hired as the Circle in the Square's managing director the same year. This era also saw the Circle's longest-lasting production, The Trojan Women, which ran from 1963 to 1965. The company had staged 47 off-Broadway and 10 Broadway productions by its 20th anniversary in 1971.

Even though the company's Broadway theater opened in 1972, the Bleecker Street location continued to host off-Broadway shows through the late 1970s. In 1994, the Circle Repertory Company took over the Circle in the Square Downtown. Developers announced plans to raze the Bleecker Street theater in 2004. The venue was demolished in 2005 and replaced with a nine-story apartment building.

=== Other locations ===
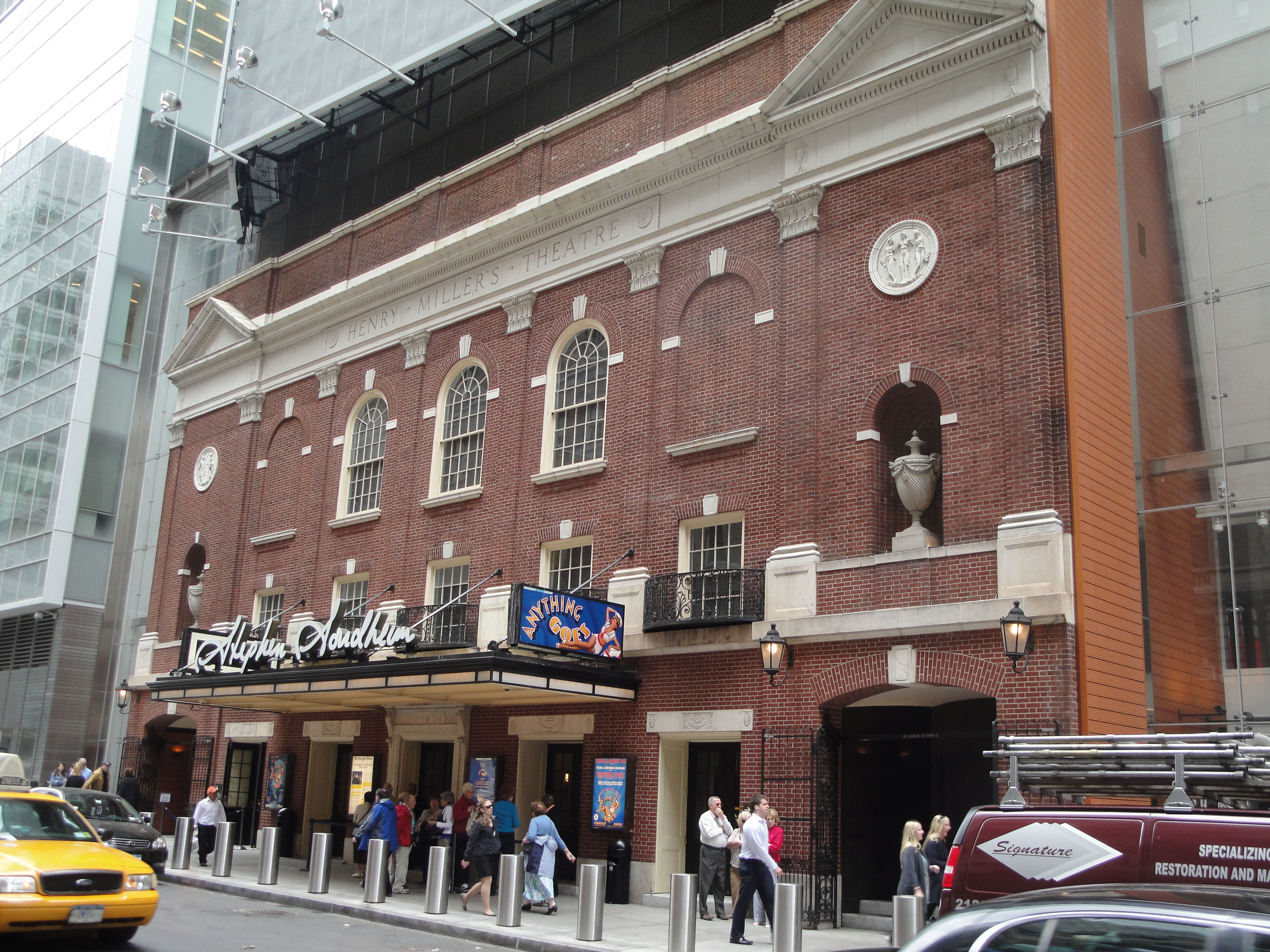
Henry Miller's (now Stephen Sondheim) Theatre

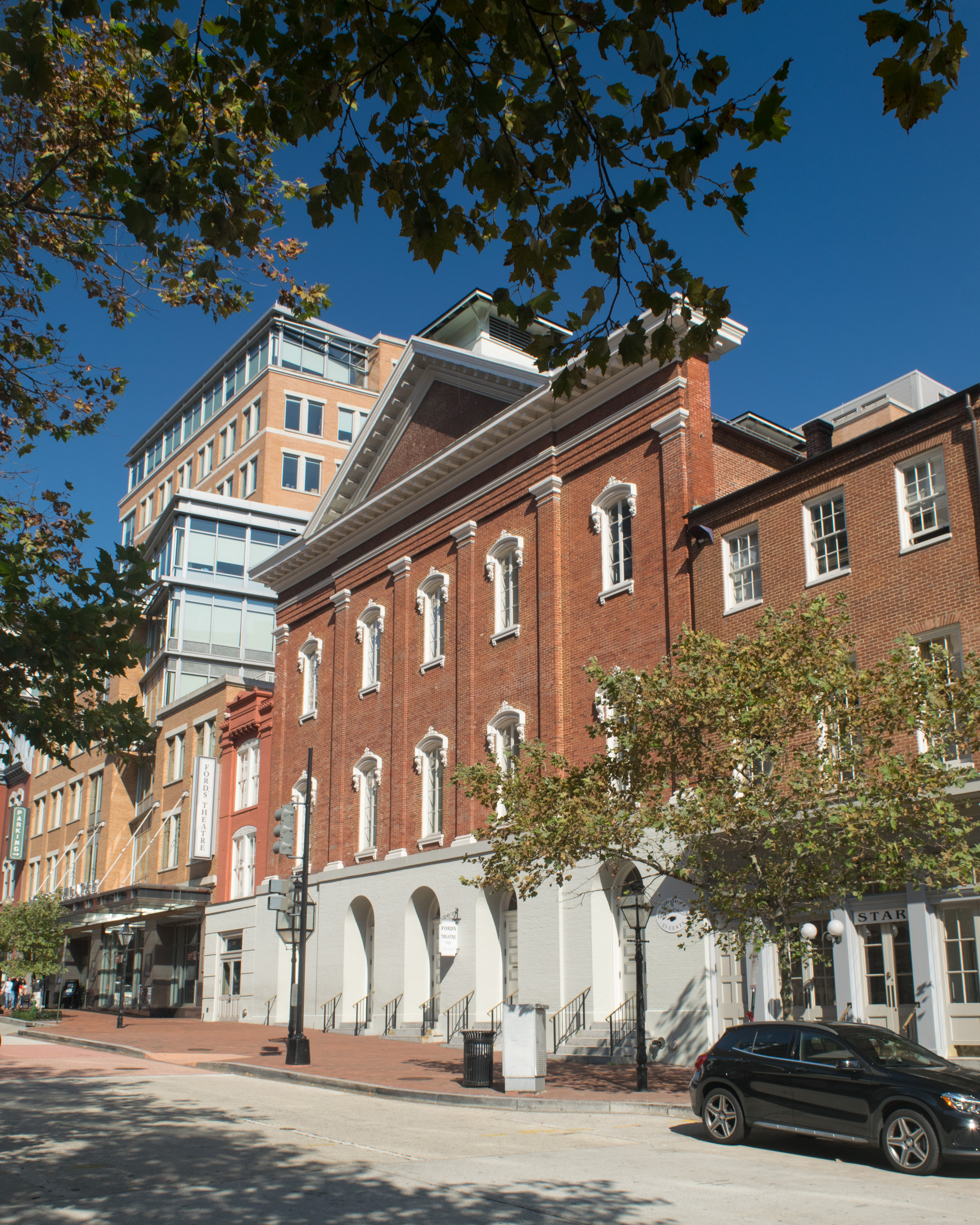
Ford's Theatre

The Circle in the Square leased the Henry Miller's Theatre from 1968 to 1969 and Ford's Theatre from 1968 to 1971.

The Circle in the Square took a one-year lease on the Henry Miller's Theatre, a Broadway theater, beginning in August 1968. The company's productions at the Henry Miller's were presented under the name "Circle in the Square on Broadway". Even though the Henry Miller's was a Broadway theater, the Circle's productions there were ineligible for the Tony Awards because the Circle was a repertory company. The company only ran two shows at the venue, both of which were flops, before its lease was terminated. Those two productions were The Cuban Thing, followed by Morning, Noon and Night, a trio of one-act plays. When the Circle's lease was terminated in January 1969, Mann and Libin were already in the process of developing their own theater on Broadway.

The Circle began staging productions at Ford's Theatre in Washington, D.C., in 1968. The Circle's productions in Washington, D.C., were initially successful, contrasting with the theatrical company's failure on Broadway. The company's productions at Ford's included revivals of such plays as Moon for the Misbegotten, Ah, Wilderness!, and Arsenic and Old Lace. However, the company's offerings were ultimately constrained by the fact that the managers of Ford's Theatre were selective about what constituted "acceptable audience entertainment". The Washington's Ford's Theatre Society sought to take over operation of Ford's Theatre in 1971, prompting the Circle to sue the society. The Circle lost the lawsuit and severed its partnership with Ford's in September 1971, citing large financial losses.

== Broadway theater history ==
In September 1967, Uris Buildings Corporation leased the site of the Capitol Theatre on Broadway, between 50th and 51st Streets, for 100 years. Uris announced it would build an office tower and a Broadway theater on the site; initially, the corporation only proposed a single theater, which later became the Gershwin Theatre. In October 1967, the New York City Planning Commission (CPC) proposed the Special Theater District Zoning Amendment, which would directly allow theaters in One Astor Plaza and the Uris Building. The New York City Board of Estimate approved the amendment that December.

The Uris Buildings Corporation agreed in February 1968 to build a second theater in the basement upon the CPC's request. The new theater was originally supposed to be an experimental theater with 300 to 375 seats. Richard Weinstein, the head of the CPC's Lower Manhattan office, asked Mann whether he was interested in occupying the Uris Building's second theater. Mann initially was uninterested in relocating to a theater with such small capacity, but he changed his mind after seeing that the space could fit 650 seats, large enough to qualify as a Broadway theater. The CPC approved the new theaters the same year, as did the Board of Estimate. Lease negotiations between Mann and Percy Uris had been completed by January 1969, and Mann and Libin formed the for-profit Thespian Theater Inc., which subleased the smaller theater to the Circle. The Circle's Broadway theater was intended as a "more elegant" version of the off-Broadway house, although the company was initially unsure whether it would retain its off-Broadway location. Mann believed that the development of relatively small Broadway theaters, such as the Circle's, would allow "more specialized plays" to be produced, as compared with larger and older theaters.

=== 1970s ===
The venue in Paramount Plaza's basement opened for inspection on October 2, 1972. The Broadway house was named the Circle in the Square–Joseph E. Levine Theatre, for Joseph E. Levine, a longtime benefactor of the Circle. Prior to the Broadway house's opening, the theater hosted a gala on October 26, 1972. featuring several actors who had performed at the Circle's off-Broadway locations. (Note: The performers included Patricia Brooks, Colleen Dewhurst, Geraldine Fitzgerald, Salome Jens, and James Earl Jones.) The Levine Theatre hosted its first performance, a revival of Mourning Becomes Electra, on November 15, 1972. In the months after the Circle's Broadway house opened, it hosted numerous performers whose portraits were hung in the lobby. Twelve thousand people were paying for annual subscriptions to the Broadway house by the beginning of 1973. Unlike at other Broadway theaters, the Circle tended to host multiple opening nights for each show. Headliners were paid a flat rate of $1,000 a week, less than in comparable Broadway theaters.

During the Broadway house's first two seasons, the Circle staged productions such as Medea, Here Are Ladies, Uncle Vanya, The Waltz of the Toreadors, and The Iceman Cometh in 1973, as well as The American Millionaire and Scapino in early 1974. Despite its early popularity, the theater could only earn up to $35,000 per week, and it relied heavily on grants. By March 1974, the theater was in danger of closing due to a shortfall of nearly $200,000. The musical Look, Homeward, as well as all shows during the 1973–1974 season, would have been canceled. The Circle announced in April 1974 that it would not close, having raised the necessary funds, including emergency grants, nearly $34,000 in individual donations, and even a grant from rival producer Joseph Papp. The success of Scapino, which featured Jim Dale, was also cited as a factor in the theater's survival.

For 1974–1975, the Circle staged The National Health, Where's Charley?, All God's Chillun Got Wings, and Death of a Salesman. The following season, the theater hosted Ah, Wilderness!, The Glass Menagerie, The Lady from the Sea, and Pal Joey. The Circle celebrated its 25th anniversary on March 8, 1976, which New York City mayor Abraham Beame proclaimed as Circle in the Square Day. The same year, at the 30th Tony Awards, the company received a Special Tony Award "for twenty-five continuous years of quality productions". For 1976–1977, the Circle continued its tradition of staging four Broadway shows per season, and the Levine Theatre hosted The Days in the Trees, The Night of the Iguana, Romeo and Juliet, and The Importance of Being Earnest. The Circle also saw revivals of four plays in 1977–1978: Tartuffe, Saint Joan, 13 Rue de l'Amour, and Once in a Lifetime. The first two plays in 1978–1979 were revivals of The Inspector General and Man and Superman. During the second half of the season, the Circle presented two new plays: Spokesong by Stewart Parker and Loose Ends by Michael Weller.

=== 1980s ===
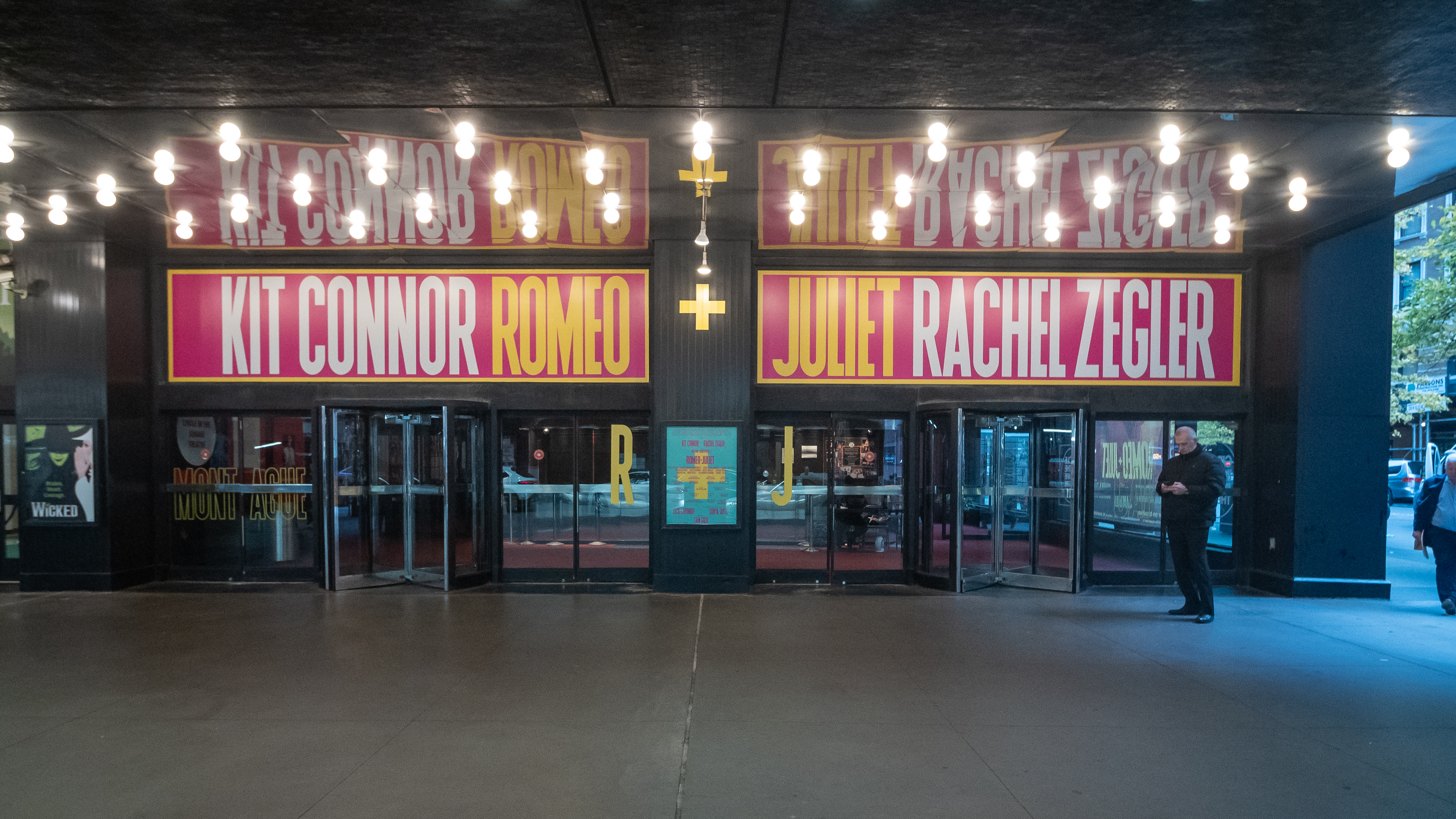
Theater entrance

Due to recurring financial issues that nearly prompted the theater company to declare bankruptcy, the Circle delayed the start of its 1979–1980 season to February 1980, extending the run of Loose Ends to cover the gap. Consequently, the season was planned to have three plays, the first two of which were Major Barbara and Past Tense. The final play, The Makropulos Affair, was replaced with The Man Who Came to Dinner on relatively short notice. For 1980–1981, the Circle returned to presenting four plays: The Bacchae, John Gabriel Borkman, The Father, and Scenes and Revelations. The Circle had originally planned to stage Hamlet after The Bacchae, but Hamlet had been replaced with Borkman due to scheduling conflicts. The theater next hosted Candida in late 1981, followed by Macbeth, Eminent Domain, and Present Laughter in 1982. The theater hosted other events during the 1980s, including tributes to playwrights Eugene O'Neill and William Saroyan.

Libin began selling annual subscriptions via telemarketing around 1983, amid increasing difficulties in obtaining subscribers. The Circle hosted three plays in 1983: The Misanthrope, The Caine Mutiny Court-Martial, and Heartbreak House. A revival of The Iceman Cometh was canceled during that year because of budget overruns. The Circle also hosted revivals of the plays Awake and Sing and Design for Living in 1984. The next year, the theater hosted the plays The Loves of Anatol, Arms and the Man, and The Marriage of Figaro, as well as Robert Klein's comedy series The Robert Klein Show!. The Circle also hosted three plays in 1986: the Steppenwolf Theatre Company's revival of The Caretaker, the original production of The Boys in Autumn, and a revival of You Never Can Tell.

In 1987, the Circle hosted Second Stage Theater's revival of the play Coastal Disturbances, which featured Annette Bening and Timothy Daly and ran for ten months. This was followed the next year by revivals of the plays A Streetcar Named Desire, Juno and the Paycock, and The Night of the Iguana, as well as An Evening with Robert Klein, another comedy series by Klein. The original English production of Yehoshua Sobol's play Ghetto ran for only 33 performances in early 1989, It was followed that September by an adaptation of the musical Sweeney Todd with Bob Gunton and Beth Fowler, which lasted for 189 performances.

=== 1990s ===
==== Early 1990s ====
Libin stepped down as the theater's managing director in 1990 but remained involved with the theater's operation. The Circle hosted two plays that year: the American premiere of the Russian play Zoya's Apartment, as well as a revival of The Miser. This was followed in 1991 by Taking Steps, Getting Married, and On Borrowed Time. By 1991–1992, the theater faced an increasingly severe financial crisis. In the first half of 1992, the theater hosted the play Search and Destroy, followed by two plays that concurrently starred Al Pacino: a revival of Salome and the original production of Ira Lewis's Chinese Coffee. Pacino had to scale back his appearances in Salome and Chinese Coffee after straining his vocal cords; as a result, these productions only broke even. The musical Anna Karenina, originally planned for 1991–1992, was generally negatively reviewed when it opened at the beginning of the next season. By then, the theater was running at a significant loss; after Anna Karenina closed, Mann tried to save money by keeping the set of Anna Karenina in place. Many of the theater's productions in the 1990s had been commercially unsuccessful.

By November 1992, the theater had a $1.3 million deficit, prompting managing director Robert A. Buckley to fire 10 of the 25 staff members and postpone the start of the 1992–1993 season by four months. Buckley resigned shortly afterward, and George A. Elmer was hired as the new managing director. The theater had only about 8,500 subscribers at the time. The Circle operated at a loss of $1.5 million, in large part because of its overdependence on box-office revenue. That March, the theater canceled two plays by Molière due to a lack of funds. Libin advised Mann to separate the finances of the theater and its associated school; an unnamed former employee told The New York Times that the theater was "living off the school". As a result, the school was separated from the theater in 1993. The school assumed the lease of the theater space, then subleased the space back to the theater.

The only show that the Circle hosted in 1993 was Wilder, Wilder, Wilder, a trio of Wilder plays that lasted for 44 performances. Afterward, the Circle was dark for over a year; a planned engagement of the play Belmont Avenue Social Club during late 1993 had been canceled. Many of the Circle's board members blamed Mann for selecting shows that did not appeal to audiences and claimed that he was too focused on a "theatrical community that was rooted in the past". As a direct consequence, the Circle had failed to compete with newer nonprofit theater companies such as Second Stage Theater, Lincoln Center Theater, or the Manhattan Theatre Club. The number of subscribers had decreased to about 5,400 by 1994.

==== New leadership ====
Harvey Seifter took over as the theater's executive director in March 1994. The Circle's artistic managers sought to revive the theater by establishing a $500,000 production fund, hiring a second artistic director to assist Mann, and creating partnerships with other theatrical companies. Josephine Abady was hired as the second artistic director in August 1994; she was to take over as the theater's sole artistic director when Mann stepped down. Abady planned to book both revivals and newer plays at the theater, and she wished to attract additional subscribers to compete with other nonprofit theaters. Although the Circle had received millions of dollars in grants during that season, Abady estimated that it would take eight years for the Circle to record a net profit. The Circle also started offering discounted tickets to attract younger patrons, since, at the time, the median subscriber was 53 years old.

The theater reopened with three plays during 1994–1995: The Shadow Box, Uncle Vanya, and The Rose Tattoo. During the 1995–1996 season, the theater hosted the plays Garden District, Holiday, Bus Stop, and Tartuffe. By then, the Circle had 7,000 subscribers. Nonetheless, many of the theater's board members were unhappy with Abady's leadership, as the theater's debt had increased by $241,000 during that season. Libin and Mann also challenged the way Abady handled the theater's finances. That August, Pacino returned to the theater in Hughie. Hughie was initially supposed to have fewer regular performances than previews, but the play was extended several times, ultimately running until November 1996.

==== Bankruptcy ====
On July 24, 1996, Mann announced that he would resign, although he and Abady would remain as artistic directors until Hughie closed. The same day, the theater's acting president Theodore R. Sayers announced that the theatrical company had filed for bankruptcy. At the time, the theater had $1.5 million in debt, in addition to $2 million in unpaid taxes. The company hired Gregory Mosher as its new producer in September 1996, and Circle officials simultaneously asked Abady to resign. Mosher and executive producer M. Edgar Rosenblum attempted to attract a wider audience by selling discounted tickets to anyone who purchased $37.50 annual memberships; they gave away about 12,000 memberships this way. Mosher also scrapped the proposed 1996–1997 season and announced plans to stage the play Stanley, which had been successful on London's West End. Stanley opened in February 1997 and was moderately successful, running for two months.

Mosher, who admired the Circle's thrust stage, had wanted to stage a revival of the Odyssey for 1997–1998. Sayers resigned from his position in May 1997. By then, observers expressed concerns that the theater had not announced any plays for the upcoming season. The theater's board voted to suspend operations on June 17, 1997, when Mosher and Rosenblum both resigned. A major factor in this decision was the theater's inability to pay back taxes, Investment banker Wilbur Ross Jr., a consultant for the theater, said at the time that the theater was unlikely to reopen unless it paid off its $1.5 million debt, as well as a $1.8 million lien that the Internal Revenue Service had placed on the theater. The next month, the theater's creditors attempted to secure a new operator; this was complicated by the fact that Mann and Libin had also claimed control of the theater's lease. Abady sued two of the theater's board members in early 1998, claiming that her termination was a breach of contract.

A federal bankruptcy judge ruled in May 1998 that Libin and Mann could retain control of the Circle. Subsequently, the men began looking for tenants; by August 1998, there were rumors that the Manhattan Theatre Club, which was looking for a Broadway house, would move into the space. Ultimately, the Circle was reorganized as an independent commercial receiving house, making it one of the few independent Broadway theaters at the time. The theater was scheduled to reopen for the 1998–1999 season with Tennessee Williams's Not About Nightingales, which opened in February 1999. Quintero died several hours after the theater reopened; the theater hosted an event in his honor a few months later. During late 1999, the theater space was leased to HBO, which used the space for taping The Chris Rock Show.

=== 21st century ===
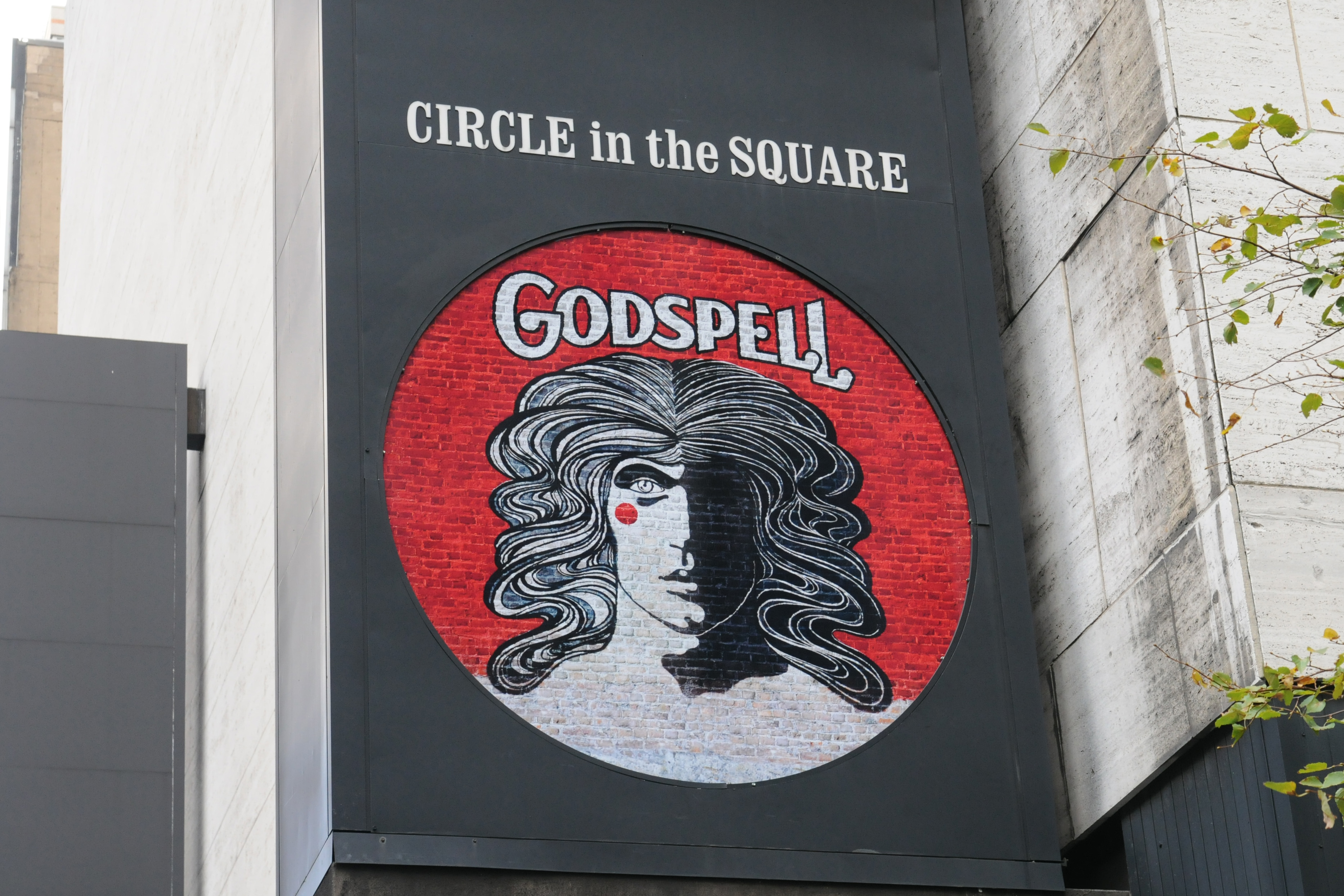
Marquee to the Circle in the Square Theatre advertising for the 2011 revival of Godspell

In early 2000, the theater hosted Sam Shepard's play True West, which ran for 154 performances. This was followed later that year by a revival of the musical The Rocky Horror Show, which ran through early 2002. The play Metamorphoses, which opened at the Circle in March 2002, ran for 401 performances over the next year. The theater next staged Yasmina Reza's comedy Life (x) 3 in 2003 and Bryony Lavery's drama Frozen in 2004. The Circle's next production, the musical comedy The 25th Annual Putnam County Spelling Bee, had over 1,100 performances from 2005 to 2008. After the success of that musical, the Circle hosted the musical Glory Days, which closed after a single performance on May 6, 2008. The next year, the Circle hosted a revival of Alan Ayckbourn's musical comedy The Norman Conquests.

The William Gibson play The Miracle Worker ran at the Circle for 28 performances in early 2010, followed the same year by the Eric Simonson play Lombardi. The Circle next staged the musical Godspell, which opened in November 2011 and ran for several months. It was followed by two relatively short-lived shows: the musical Soul Doctor, which had 66 performances in late 2013, and the play Bronx Bombers, which ran for less than a month in early 2014. The Circle also hosted two more successful plays in 2014: Lady Day at Emerson's Bar and Grill and The River, both of which recouped their production costs. The River set the theater's current box-office record as of 2023, earning $917,000 on opening week in November 2014. The theater then hosted the musical Fun Home, which opened in 2015 and ran for more than a year, and the musical In Transit, which opened in 2016 and lasted 181 performances. At the end of the decade, the Circle hosted two musical revivals: Once on This Island, which ran from November 2017 to January 2019, and an adaptation of Oklahoma!, which ran from April 2019 to January 2020.

The theatre temporarily closed on March 12, 2020, due to the COVID-19 pandemic. It reopened on September 23, 2021, with previews of Chicken & Biscuits, which ran through November 2021. Next, the Circle hosted a revival of the play American Buffalo, which ran from April to July 2022. By then, the Circle was the only remaining Broadway theater that was not operated by either a nonprofit company or a large organization. The musical KPOP opened at the theater in November 2022, but it lasted for only two weeks. A limited engagement of the concert Melissa Etheridge: My Window opened at the Circle in the Square in September 2023. Henrik Ibsen's play An Enemy of the People, adapted by Amy Herzog, opened at the theater in March 2024, running for three months; it was followed in October by a limited-run revival of Romeo and Juliet. Afterward, the musical Just in Time opened at the theater in April 2025. Libin remained the theater's president until his death in June 2025.

== School ==
The Circle in the Square Theatre School is a drama school associated with the Circle in the Square Theatre; it is the only accredited conservatory attached to a Broadway theater. The school was established in 1961 and is housed within Paramount Plaza at 1633 Broadway. The school was split from the theater itself in 1993 and has operated as a nonprofit since then. The school has also participated in student exchange programs. Over the years, the school's alumni have included Kevin Bacon and Philip Seymour Hoffman.

== Notable productions ==
=== Off-Broadway ===
This list only includes shows performed at the Circle in the Square's Sheridan Square and Bleecker Street theaters, not those performed by the company at other theaters. Productions are listed by the year of their first performance.

Notable productions at the theater
Opening year	Name	Refs.
1952	Summer and Smoke	
1955	La Ronde	
1956	The Iceman Cometh	
1958	The Quare Fellow	
1959	Our Town	
1962	Under Milk Wood	
1963	Desire Under the Elms	
1963	The Trojan Women	
1965	The White Devil	
1966	Eh?	
1967	Drums in the Night	
1967	Iphigenia in Aulis	
1968	A Moon for the Misbegotten	
1969	Little Murders	
1970	Boesman and Lena	
1972	We Bombed in New Haven	
1973	The Hot l Baltimore	
1978	I'm Getting My Act Together and Taking It on the Road	
1981	American Buffalo	
1982	Greater Tuna	
1984	To Gillian on Her 37th Birthday	
1987	Oil City Symphony	
1990	The Rothschilds	

=== Broadway ===
This list only includes shows performed at the Circle in the Square's Paramount Plaza theater, not those performed by the company at other theaters. Productions are listed by the year of their first performance.

Notable productions at the theater
Opening year	Name	Refs.
1972	Mourning Becomes Electra	
1973	Medea	
1973	Uncle Vanya	
1973	The Waltz of the Toreadors	
1973	The Iceman Cometh	
1974	Scapino	
1974	The National Health	
1974	Where's Charley?	
1975	All God's Chillun Got Wings	
1975	Death of a Salesman	
1975	Ah, Wilderness!	
1975	The Glass Menagerie	
1976	Geraldine Fitzgerald in Songs of the Street	
1976	The Lady from the Sea	
1976	Pal Joey	
1976	The Night of the Iguana	
1977	Romeo and Juliet	
1977	The Importance of Being Earnest	
1977	Tartuffe	
1977	Saint Joan	
1978	13 Rue de l'Amour	
1978	Once in a Lifetime	
1978	The Inspector General	
1978	Man and Superman	
1979	Spokesong	
1980	Major Barbara	
1980	The Man Who Came to Dinner	
1980	The Bacchae	
1980	John Gabriel Borkman	
1981	The Father	
1981	Candida	
1982	Macbeth	
1982	Present Laughter	
1983	The Misanthrope	
1983	The Caine Mutiny Court-Martial	
1983	Heartbreak House	
1984	Awake and Sing	
1984	Design for Living	
1985	Arms and the Man	
1985	The Marriage of Figaro	
1985	The Robert Klein Show!	
1986	The Caretaker	
1986	You Never Can Tell	
1987	Coastal Disturbances	
1988	A Streetcar Named Desire	
1988	An Evening with Robert Klein	
1988	The Night of the Iguana	
1988	The Devil's Disciple	
1989	Ghetto	
1989	Sweeney Todd	
1990	The Miser	
1991	Taking Steps	
1991	Getting Married	
1991	On Borrowed Time	
1992	Salome	
1992	Anna Karenina	
1993	Three productions by Thornton Wilder	(Note: The Happy Journey to Trenton and Camden, The Long Christmas Dinner, Pullman Car Hiawatha)
1994	The Shadow Box	
1995	Uncle Vanya	
1995	The Rose Tattoo	
1995	Garden District	
1995	Holiday	
1996	Bus Stop	
1996	Tartuffe	
1996	Hughie	
1997	Stanley	
1999	Not About Nightingales	
2000	True West	
2000	The Rocky Horror Show	
2002	Metamorphoses	
2003	Life (x) 3	
2004	Frozen	
2005	The 25th Annual Putnam County Spelling Bee	
2008	Glory Days	
2009	The Norman Conquests	
2010	The Miracle Worker	
2010	Lombardi	
2011	Godspell	
2013	Soul Doctor	
2014	Bronx Bombers	
2014	Lady Day at Emerson's Bar and Grill	
2014	The River	
2015	Fun Home	
2016	In Transit	
2017	Once on This Island	
2019	Oklahoma!	
2021	Chicken & Biscuits	
2022	American Buffalo	
2022	KPOP	
2024	An Enemy of the People	
2024	Romeo and Juliet	
2025	Just in Time	

== See also ==
- List of Broadway theaters
