= Summer Play Festival =

Theatre festival in New York

The Summer Play Festival (SPF) was a theatre festival held in New York, USA.

== Description ==
The annual four-week Summer Play Festival took place during the summer months at the Public Theater in New York City. It was founded by Broadway producer Arielle Tepper Madover and staged new plays and musicals by emerging writers. The first Summer Play Festival was presented in 2004, introducing a $10 ticket price that was a key feature of the event for its entire run. A year later in 2005, The Living Room for Artists, Inc. was formed as a non-profit organization to ensure that the Festival perpetuates its goals, and whose central mission is to both fuel the growth of emerging theatre artists and encourage people of all ages to create, attend and work in the theatre. Unlike the New York International Fringe Festival, there was no application fee and each production was allotted a significant budget. The SPF organization handled all the marketing and maintained no long-term rights to the plays and musicals showcased. The Festival's advertising blanketed New York during the summer, with television, newspaper, and magazine ads. Bus stops and street posters also advertised the event.

100 emerging playwrights and composers, and around 1000 directors, designers, and other theatre artists worked at the Festival during its six-year run. The Festival had a successful track record in identifying emerging talent: SPF's writers and artists have gone on to receive numerous awards and accolades, and productions on Broadway, off-Broadway, regionally and internationally. Many have also developed projects with major film and television companies. The New York Times, Variety, and numerous other newspapers lauded Tepper's vision of creating affordable theatre for audiences, and a unique creative opportunity for emerging and established artists.

Other Festival programs included concerts, panels, salons, and forums developed in conjunction with Time Out New York and the NYC Mayor's Office of Film, Theatre and Broadcasting, a university internship program, a play commissioning program, and residency programs with the Donmar Warehouse, the National Theatre of Great Britain, and a number of Festivals in Europe.

Artists included Ally Sheedy, Mary Beth Peil, Marin Hinkle, John Gould Rubin, Annie Parisse, Katherine Waterston, Stew, Annie Golden, Adam Gwon, Jeremy Schonfeld, Georgia Stitt, Sam Gold, Beau Willimon, Christopher Gattelli, Trip Cullman, Jordan Harrison, Chloe Moss, Evan Cabnet, Kristoffer Diaz, Adam Driver, J.T. Rogers, and Quiara Hudes.

== Past Festivals ==
2009

- The Chimes by Kevin Christopher Snipes, directed by Adam Immerwahr
- Departure Lounge by Dougal Irvine, directed by Christopher Gattelli
- Reborning by Zayd Dohrn, directed by Kip Fagan
- The Happy Sad by Ken Urban, directed by Trip Cullman
- The Sacrifices by Alena Smith, directed by Sam Gold
- Tender by Nicki Bloom, directed by Daniella Topol
- We Declare You A Terrorist by Tim J. Lord, directed by Niegel Smith
- Whore by Rick Viede, directed by Stephen Brackett

2008

- The Black Suits music & lyrics by Joe Iconis, book by Joe Iconis & Robert Maddock, directed by John Simpkins
- Esther Demsack by Billy Finnegan, directed by Stafford Arima
- Future Me by Stephen Brown, directed by Joanna Settle
- Green Girl by Sarah Hammond, directed by Wendy McClellan
- Neighborhood 3: Requisition of Doom by Jennifer Haley, directed by Kerry Whigham
- Tell Out My Soul by Jacquelyn Honess-Martin, directed by Evan Cabnet
- The Ones That Flutter by Sylvia Reed, directed by Stephen Brackett
- Tio Pepe by Matthew Lopez, directed by Caitlin Moon

2007

- Alice in War by Steven Bogart, directed by Alice Reagan
- Blueprint by Bixby Elliot, directed by Jonathan Silverstein
- Cipher by Cory Hinkle, directed by Kip Fagan
- Devil Land by Desi Moreno-Penson, directed by Jose Zayas
- Flesh and the Desert by Carson Kreitzer, directed by Beth Milles
- The Gabriels by Van Badham, directed by Rebecca Patterson
- Half of Plenty by Lisa Dillman, directed by Meredith McDonough
- Lower Ninth by Beau Willimon, directed by Daniel Goldstein
- Minor Gods by Charles Forbes, directed by Gaye Taylor Upchurch
- Missing Celia Rose by Ian August, directed by Adam Immerwahr
- My Wandering Boy by Julie Marie Myatt, directed by John Gould Rubin
- The Nightshade Family by Ruth McKee, directed by Shelley Butler
- Not Waving by Ellen Melaver, directed by Douglas Mercer
- Novel by Anna Ziegler, directed by Michael Goldfried
- Unfold Me by Joy Tomasko, directed by Linsay Firman
- Vrooommm! A NASComedy by Janet Allard, directed by David Lee

2006

- The Butcherhouse Chronicles by Michael P. Hidalgo, directed by Thomas Caruso
- Father Joy by Sheri Wilner, directed by Pam MacKinnon
- The Fearless by Etan Frankel, directed by Scott Schwartz
- Gardening Leave by Joanna Pinto, directed by Michael Goldfried
- Hardball by Victoria Stewart, directed by Lou Jacob
- Hitting the Wall by Barbara Blumenthal-Ehrlich, directed by Drew Barr
- Marge by Peter Morris, directed by Alex Timbers
- Millicent Scowlworthy by Rob Handel, directed by Ken Rus Schmoll
- Sonia Flew by Melinda Lopez, directed by Justin Waldman
- Spain by Jim Knable, directed by Jeremy Dobrish
- Splitting Infinity by Jamie Pachino, directed by Matt Shakman
- The Squirrel by Alex Moggridge, directed by Patrick McNulty
- Swansong by Patrick Page, directed by David Muse
- Training Wisteria by Molly Smith Metzler, directed by Evan Cabnet
- A Wives' Tale by Christina Ham, directed by Rosemary Andress

2005

- The Adventures of Barrio Grrrl! by Quiara Alegría Hudes, directed by Liesl Tommy
- Courting Vampires by Laura Schellhardt, directed by Lou Jacob
- crooked by Catherine Trieschmann, directed by Linsay Firman
- Ephemera by John Yearley, directed by Erma Duricko
- How Love is Spelt by Chloë Moss, directed by Michael Sexton
- Indoor/Outdoor by Kenny Finkle, directed by Daniel Goldstein
- Madagascar by J. T. Rogers, directed by Gus Reyes
- The Map Maker's Sorrow by Chris Lee, directed by Stefan Novinski
- Messalina by Gordon Dahlquist, directed by David Levine
- Mimesophobia by Carlos Murillo, directed by Matt August
- Sick by Zakiyyah Alexander, directed by Daniella Topol
- Split Wide Open by Christina Gorman, directed by Lisa Rothe
- Ted Kaczynski Killed People With Bombs by Michelle Carter, directed by Jeremy Dobrish
- tempOdyssey by Dan Dietz, directed by Randy White
- Welcome to Arroyo's by Kristoffer Diaz, directed by Jaime Castaneda
- Wildlife by Victor Lodato, directed by Michael Sexton

2004

- Anatomy 1968 by Karen Hartman, directed by Lisa Rothe
- Arrivals & Departures by Rogelio Martinez, directed by Lou Jacob
- Colorado by Peter Sinn Nachtrieb, directed by Tracy Ward
- Earthquake Chica by Anne Garcia-Romero, directed by Leah C. Gardiner
- El Paso Blue by Octavio Solis, directed by Juliette Carrillo
- Honor & The River by Anton Dudley, directed by Ken Schmoll
- It's Only Life: The Songs of John Bucchino by John Bucchino, directed by Daisy Prince
- Kid-Simple by Jordan Harrison, directed by Will Frears
- Kitty Kitty Kitty by Noah Haidle, directed by Carolyn Cantor
- Mayhem by Kelly Stuart, directed by Melissa Kievman
- Pink by Heather Lynn MacDonald, directed by Linsay Firman
- Prozak & the Platypus by Elise Thoron and Jill Sobule, directed by Rebecca Taichman Prozak and the Platypus webbed site
- Sam & Lucy by Brooke Berman, directed by Trip Cullman
- Spin Moves by Ken Weitzman, directed by Suzanne Agins
- Stealing Sweets and Punching People by Phil Porter, directed by Michael Sexton
- Sweetness by Gary Sunshine, directed by Trip Cullman
- The Dew Point by Neena Beber, directed by William Carden
- Wet by Liz Duffy Adams, directed by Kent Nicholson
