= The Glory of Living =

- Original language: English
- Written by: Rebecca Gilman
- Genre: Drama
- Setting: Tennessee, Georgia and Alabama

Premiere
- Date: December 5, 1996
- Place: Forest Park, Illinois

The Glory of Living is a 1996 play by Rebecca Gilman. The play received its world premiere production at the Circle Theatre Chicago in Forest Park, Illinois. The play has won several awards and was a finalist for the 2002 Pulitzer Prize for Drama.

== Plot ==
The play opens with the main characters Lisa and Clint meeting for the first time. Clint has accompanied a friend to Lisa and her mother's mobile home to see Lisa's mother, a prostitute. Clint picks up on Lisa's unease about her mother's situation and begins charming her. The next scene opens a few years later and Clint and Lisa have married and have twins who are being cared for by Clint's mother. The couple has been living in a series of motel rooms and are playing a scam whereby Lisa lures young girls into the room where Clint rapes and abuses them. Afterwards, Lisa murders the girls and disposes of their bodies. Plagued with guilt, Lisa calls the police with anonymous tips on the location of the bodies. Act I concludes with the couple's arrest.

Act II deals primarily with the couple's punishments but focuses on Lisa and her motives for her actions. The audience is shown that Lisa has not been able to emotionally mature and that has led her to live the life she has lived.

== Notable productions ==
- Circle Theatre Chicago, December 1996 - world premiere. Directed by Robin Stanton. Starring Deborah Puette (in her professional debut) as Lisa, Marty Higginbotham as Clint, and Mark St. Amant as Carl.
- Royal Court Theatre, London, 1999. Directed by Kathryn Hunter
- Off-Broadway, MCC Theater production, October 30, 2001 to December 2, 2001. Directed by Philip Seymour Hoffman with Anna Paquin as Lisa and Jeffrey Donovan as Clint and David Aaron Baker as Carl.
- Dublin July 2005 produced by AboutFACE Theatre Company at Project Arts Centre and at the Civic Theatre, Tallaght. Directed by Erin Murray.

== Awards and recognition ==
- Finalist for the 2002 Pulitzer Prize in Drama
- 1997 Joseph Jefferson Citations in Chicago:
  - New Work, Rebecca Gilman (win)
  - Director (Play), Robin Stanton (win)
  - Actress in a Principal Role (Play), Deborah Puette (win)
  - Actor in a Lead Role (Play), Marty Higginbotham (win)
- American Theatre Critics Association's Osborn Award for Best New American Play.
- 2002 Drama Desk Award:
  - Outstanding Actress (Play), Anna Paquin (nominee)
  - Outstanding Sound Design, David Van Tieghem (nominee)
