= In a Forest, Dark and Deep =

2011 play by Neil LaBute

- Written by: Neil LaBute
- Original language: English
- Genre: Dark Comedy

Premiere
- Date premiered: 14 March 2011
- Place premiered: Vaudeville Theatre, London

In a Forest, Dark and Deep is a play by Neil LaBute. It received its world premiere production in the West End's Vaudeville Theatre on 14 March 2011 following previews from 3 March 2011, running for a limited season until 4 June 2011. The production starred Matthew Fox and Olivia Williams. A review in The Observer described the play as "[…] something approaching a conventional thriller [where] a college lecturer and her redneck brother meet in a log cabin in the midst of the wilds there's a whiff of incest.

The play had its American premiere at Profiles Theatre in Chicago, Illinois in April 2012 through 3 June. The production stars Darrell W. Cox and Natasha Lowe and was directed by Joe Jahraus. The Chicago Tribune reviewer wrote:"Interesting and formatively atypical, it strikes me as very much a meditation on what is and is not true, on the ease of rushing to misjudgment, and also a further manifestation of the longstanding authorial fascination with the close link between deep intimacy and dark violence."

This production was followed by a Contemporary American Theater Festival (Shepherdstown, West Virginia) production as part of the 2012 Festival from 6 to 29 July 2012.
