= Jason Wells (playwright) =

Jason Wells (born 1960) is an American actor and award-winning playwright.

== Career ==
Wells's first play, "Men of Tortuga", had critically acclaimed runs at Steppenwolf Theatre's First Look Repertory of New Work, the Asolo Repertory Theatre in Sarasota, and the Profiles Theatre in Chicago. It has also received productions at Apollinaire Theatre Company in Massachusetts; Furious Theatre Company in Pasadena; Purple Heart Theatre in Dublin, Ireland; and Street Corner Arts in Austin.

Wells's second play, "Perfect Mendacity", was a commission from Manhattan Theatre Club and the Sloan Foundation. Like "Men of Tortuga", it debuted at Steppenwolf and went on to its official world premiere at the Asolo. In 2010, it was a finalist for the American Theatre Critics Association's Steinberg/New Play Award, and won the ATCA M. Elizabeth Osborn Award.

"The North Plan" debuted at First Look in 2010, and had its official world premiere run at Portland Center Stage in Portland, Oregon, to more critical acclaim.

Wells is also an actor with numerous TV, film, and stage credits. His movie credits include The Weather Man, Lana's Rain, No Sleep 'Til Madison, The Watcher, and The Public Eye. His TV credits include a recurring role on Prison Break.
