= She Who Dared =

- Premiere: June 3, 2025; Studebaker Theater, Chicago, Illinois, U.S.

She Who Dared is an American opera written and composed by Jasmine Arielle Barnes and Deborah D.E.E.P. Mouton. The opera follows seven women in the U.S. civil rights movement: Aurelia Browder, Claudette Colvin, Susie McDonald, Rosa Parks, Jeanetta Reese, Jo Ann Robinson, and Mary Louise Smith. It was commissioned by American Lyric Theater and premiered on June 3, 2025 at the Chicago Opera Theater, in the Studebaker Theater in Chicago, Illinois.

The work is the duo's first full length opera, and is thought to be the first professionally-produced opera written by two Black women. It combines classical music with "soul, gospel and protest music". The work has an all-Black cast.

Mouton was inspired to write the opera after learning she was related to Aurelia Browder. The creative duo began working on the piece in 2022. Chicago Opera Theater received an NEA grant in the amount of $30,000 for the world premiere production.

== Cast ==
Role	2025 premiere
Aurelia Browder	Chrystal E. Willams
Claudette Colvin	Jasmine Habersham
Susie McDonald	Leah Dexter
Rosa Parks	Jacqueline Echols
Jeanetta Reese	Cierra Byrd
Jo Ann Robinson	Deborah Nansteel
Mary Louise Smith	Lindsey Reynolds
