= Circle Theatre =

Circle Theatre or Circle Theater may refer to:

== Concept ==
- Theatre-in-the-round, arena theatre, or central staging is any theatre space in which the audience surrounds the stage area, often in the shape of a circle theatre and sometimes named as such

== Theatres ==
- Circle Theatre (Broadway) (1901-1935), a former Broadway theatre that also was a music hall, movie theatre, and venue for vaudeville and burlesque
- Circle in the Square Theatre, a Broadway theater in New York City
- Circle in the Square Theatre School, school associated with the Broadway theater
- Circle X Theatre, Hollywood, California
- Circle Theater (Indianapolis, Indiana), listed on the National Register of Historic Places in Indiana
- El Centro Theatre, founded as the Circle Theatre in Hollywood, California
- Hilbert Circle Theatre, formerly known as Circle Theatre, a historic theatre in Oklahoma
- Circle Theatre Chicago, founded in 1985, is a theatre company in Chicago, Illinois

== Media ==
- Armstrong Circle Theatre, an American drama television series that ran during 1950 to 1957

== See also ==
- Dress circle, balcony seating in a theatre
