= Deborah Brevoort =

Contemporary American playwright and librettist

- Born: Columbus, Ohio, U.S.
- Education: Brown University (MFA); New York University (MFA)
- Occupation: Playwright
- Spouse: Chuck Cooper
- Writing career
- Language: English
- Years active: 2001–present
- Period: Contemporary
- Notable work: The Women of Lockerbie
- Website: deborahbrevoort.com

Deborah Brevoort is a contemporary American playwright and librettist known for writing plays, musicals, and operas that combine several theatrical practices from around the world to depict contemporary American subjects. These include a Japanese Noh drama about Elvis Presley (Blue Moon Over Memphis); a musical comedy inspired by world mythologies and Saturday morning cartoons (Coyote Goes Salmon Fishing); and a contemporary drama about the aftermath of terrorism written in the form of a Greek tragedy (The Women of Lockerbie) among others.

== Early life and education ==
Deborah Brevoort was born in Columbus, Ohio, to Virginia and Gordon Brevoort. She is the eldest of three children, and graduated from Ridgewood High School. She attended Kent State University, where she earned a Bachelor of Arts in English and political science, followed by a Master of Arts in political science.

Brevoort moved to Juneau, Alaska in 1979. She worked in Alaskan politics, serving as a special assistant to Lieutenant Governor Terry Miller and Alaska State Senator Frank Ferguson. In 1983, she became the producing director of Perseverance Theatre and an actor in the company.

Brevoort attended Brown University in Providence, Rhode Island, where she received her Master of Fine Arts in playwriting. Brevoort also attended New York University, where she received a Master of Fine Arts in musical theater writing.

== Career ==
=== Plays and Musicals ===
==== Early Works ====
Brevoort's early works include Signs of Life and Into the Fire. Signs of Life premiered at Perseverance Theatre in Alaska in 1989, and Into the Fire was developed at the 1998 O'Neill Playwright's Conference. Her first musical, Coyote Goes Salmon Fishing, written with Scott Davenport Richards as their thesis musical in the NYU Graduate Musical Theatre Writing Program, was subsequently optioned for Broadway by Stuart Ostrow. The musical premiered at Perseverance Theatre in Alaska in 1996, directed by Molly Smith, and went on to win the Frederick Loewe Award in musical theatre at New Dramatists.

==== The Women of Lockerbie ====
Brevoort's first play to receive major attention was The Women of Lockerbie, which was inspired by the Lockerbie laundry project after the bombing of Pan Am Flight 103 over Lockerbie. Using the form of a Greek tragedy, it tells the story of a mother from New Jersey who roams the hills of Lockerbie looking for her son's remains. There, she meets the women of Lockerbie, who are fighting to obtain the 11,000 articles of clothing found in the wreckage in order to wash the clothes and return them to the families. The play premiered off-Broadway in 2003 by the New Group and the Women's Project in a production directed by Scott Elliot and starring Judith Ivey and Larry Pine, after winning the silver medal in the Onassis International Playwriting Competition and the Kennedy Center Fund for New American Plays Award. It was later produced at London's Orange Tree Theatre featuring Lisa Eichhorn. It continues to be produced in the US and abroad and has been translated in multiple languages.

==== King Island Christmas ====
Brevoort's next work was King Island Christmas, a musical based on the Alaskan children's book by Jean Rogers, with composer David Friedman. Using the form of the oratorio, it tells the story of a remote Alaskan village struggling to fetch their priest from a boat in the freezing Bering Sea. The musical was optioned by a group of New York producers in 2001 who released a cast album with Tony winner Chuck Cooper and the late Marin Mazzie, produced by Thomas Z. Shepard. It was staged in New York at SIR Studios in 2000, directed by Pat Birch with a set design by Eugene Lee. The musical has been extensively produced in the US, after winning the 1998 Frederick Loewe Award in musical theatre at New Dramatists, where she was a member playwright. It premiered at Perseverance Theatre in Alaska in 1998.

==== Blue Moon Over Memphis ====
Another significant work is Blue Moon Over Memphis, Brevoort's Noh drama about Elvis Presley. It began as her MFA thesis at Brown University in 1993, where she blended the American story of Elvis Presley with conventions from 14th-century Japanese Noh theatre to create an electronic, Americanized Noh that tells the story of an Elvis fan who makes the pilgrimage to Graceland on the anniversary of Elvis's death. In 2013, she was approached by composer Rick Emmert and Theatre Nohgaku in Tokyo to write a second version of the play to be performed as a traditional Noh drama with Noh masks, costumes and instrumentation. In 2024 and 2025, the traditional version was produced in Japan by the Yanai Initiative at Tokyo's Okuma Auditorium and Kita Noh Theatre and Kyoto's Kongo Noh Theatre, where it has been heralded by critics and Noh scholars for breaking new ground and for its innovative structure.

==== The Poetry of Pizza ====
Brevoort's next play was The Poetry of Pizza, a contemporary comedy of errors in which the unlikely romance of an American scholar and a Kurdish refugee sets in motion a rash of culinary courtships. The play is a romantic comedy built on the conventions of farce and the methods of postmodernism. It premiered at the Purple Rose Theatre in 2007, directed by Guy Sanville and produced by Jeff Daniels, after being developed in the Women's Playwright's Festival at Centenary Stage in NJ. It has gone on to numerous productions at American regional theatres including Mixed Blood, Virginia Stage and others.

==== The Velvet Weapon ====
Brevoort turned to the form of political farce for The Velvet Weapon, which was inspired by interviews she conducted with the theatre artists who were involved in the Velvet Revolution in the former Czechoslovakia. A comic exploration of populist democracy, the play tells the story of an audience who stops a performance and takes over a show. CEC Arts Link supported the research and writing of the play, which was sponsored by the 9 Gates Festival in Prague and later won the Trustus Theatre's 2014 National Playwriting competition.

==== The Blue-Sky Boys ====
Brevoort received a commission in 2003 from the Alfred P. Sloan Foundation Science and Technology project to write The Blue-Sky Boys, a comic romp through the minds and imaginations of the NASA Apollo engineers. The play received the Galileo Prize at Ensemble Studio Theatre, where it was extensively developed through readings and workshops. In 2010, NASA Apollo engineers Gary Woods, Dick Church, and Jim Long, with astronaut Harrison Schmitt, the last man to walk on the Moon, helped to launch the play at the Barter Theatre in Virginia. It went on to productions at Capital Repertory Theatre in Albany NY in 2016, directed by Gordon Greenberg, where it was named the best production of the year by Berkshire area critics, and Florida Studio Theatre in 2025/26.

==== The Comfort Team ====
During the surge in Iraq, Brevoort was commissioned by Virginia Stage to write a play about military wives in the Norfolk, Virginia area. After conducting interviews with over 40 wives from various backgrounds, regions, and branches of the armed services, she wrote The Comfort Team, inspired by their stories. The play follows a group of Navy wives who are left behind while their husbands are away at war. It received an artistic excellence grant from the National Endowment for the Arts.

==== My Lord, What a Night ====
Brevoort received the Liberty Live commission from NJ's Premiere Stages in 2015 to write My Lord, What a Night, a historic drama inspired by the night that the singer Marian Anderson gave a concert in Princeton, NJ, and was refused a room at the Nassau Inn because she was Black. Albert Einstein took her in for the night, creating a controversy, but beginning a lifelong friendship. After the premiere at Premiere Stages, Brevoort expanded the play into a full-length version to include the events that led to Anderson's historic concert at the Lincoln Memorial. The expanded play was produced as a rolling world premiere at the Contemporary American Theatre Festival, Orlando Shakespeare Theatre and Florida Studio Theatre from 2019-2021 through the National New Play Network. It was then produced at the historic Ford's Theatre in Washington DC in a critically acclaimed production directed by Sheldon Epps.

==== The Drolls ====
During the COVID-19 pandemic, Florida Studio Theatre commissioned Brevoort to write The Drolls, a comedy built on the comedy routines performed by the drolls, street performers in Puritan England. It tells the story of the outlaw actors and musicians who performed in the streets of London during the Puritan crackdown and the rediscovery of Shakespeare, who was almost lost when theatres were closed.

=== Opera ===
Brevoort began writing opera librettos in 2009 after being accepted into the first Composer Librettist Development program at the American Lyric Theater in New York where she received training in libretto writing from Mark Adamo, Cori Ellison, Daniel Catan, Anthony Davis, Larry Edelson and, Michael Korie. Since then, she has penned 10 operas that have been commissioned and produced by leading opera companies in the US. In 2023 she was awarded the Campbell Opera Librettist prize from Opera America, the only prize for librettists in the opera world.

==== Embedded ====
Brevoort's first opera was Embedded, written with Patrick Soluri. It was commissioned by American Lyric Theater during the Poe centennial as part of the Poe Project, a double bill of operas that addressed the question: "What might Edgar Allan Poe write if he were alive today?" Embedded takes the Cask of the Amontillado and sets it in the age of terrorism and the world of broadcast journalism. It tells the story of a famous but aging TV anchor who learns she will be replaced by a younger anchor and agrees to be embedded in a terrorist cell in order to save her job. The opera premiered in a critically acclaimed production at the Fargo Moorhead Opera in 2014, directed by Sam Helfrich, and at Fort Worth Opera in 2016, where it also won the Frontiers Competition.

==== Steal a Pencil for Me ====
Brevoort's next opera was Steal a Pencil for Me, with composer Gerald Cohen, based on the love letters written between Jaap and Ina Polak while they were imprisoned in the Bergen Belsen concentration camp during World War II. The opera was first presented in concert stagings at the Shaarei Tikvah congregation in Riverdale, NY and the Jewish Theological Seminary in New York City to celebrate Jaap Polak's 100th birthday. It was also presented in the Frontiers Festival at Fort Worth Opera. It premiered at Opera Colorado in 2018 where it was recorded for the Sono Luminus label.

==== Murasaki's Moon ====
The Metropolitan Museum of Art's exhibition, The Tale of Genji: A Japanese Classic Illuminated, was the impetus for Murasaki's Moon, commissioned by the Metropolitan Museum of Arts, On Site Opera and American Lyric Theater. The opera, written with Michi Wiancko, tells the story of Murasaki Shikibu, a lady-in-waiting in the Imperial Court of 11th-century Japan, who was catapulted to fame when she wrote The Tale of Genji, the world's first novel. It was presented as a site-specific opera in the Astor Court in conjunction with the Met's Genji exhibit.

==== Quamino's Map ====
Brevoort's next opera was Quamino's Map, with Belizean-British composer Errollyn Wallen, which tells the story of black Americans who were enslaved during the Revolutionary War and fought for the British against the Americans. When the war was over, the British relocated the formerly enslaved to London where they meet members of London's Black gentry. It was commissioned by the Chicago Opera Theater where it premiered in 2022.

==== The Knock ====
In 2023, Brevoort's next opera was The Knock, written with Aleksandra Vrebalov. Inspired by interviews conducted with military wives, the opera tells the story of a group of wives who go through a dramatic crisis that changes their lives. It was commissioned by Glimmerglass Festival. When the COVID-19 pandemic forced the closure of the opera house, and the cancellation of the premiere, Glimmerglass filmed the opera as a live-action movie which premiered on Veteran's Day in 2021 and is now available on YouTube. Cincinnati Opera produced the stage premiere in 2023, in a critically acclaimed production directed by Alison Moritz who later staged it at Central City Opera in Colorado.

==== Albert Nobbs ====
Brevoort and composer Patrick Soluri were one of four teams commissioned to enter to the 2018 Dominic Pellicciotti competition for opera composition at the Crane School of Music in Potsdam NY. They wrote Albert Nobbs, a full-length opera based on the novella by George Moore. The opera tells the story of a female butler in 19th century Ireland who hides her gender and lives and works as a man. It was a finalist for the award and presented in the Frontiers Festival at Ft. Worth Opera in 2019.

==== Dinner 4 3 ====
When COVID-19 closed the opera houses, a coalition of ten opera companies launched The Decameron Opera Coalition, to create Tales from a Safe Distance, an on-line opera web series based on Boccaccio's The Decameron, a collection of 100 stories told during the Black Plague in the 14th century. Brevoort and composer Michael Ching were commissioned by Fargo Moorhead Opera to write Dinner 4 3 for the series, an adaptation of "Day 5, Story 10" from Decameron. The series was named the "Best of 2020" by Opera Wire, received the Freddie Award for Excellence in Opera, and was included in the Library of Congress's Performing Arts COVID-19 Response Collection.

==== The Polar Bat and The Impresario ====
Brevoort was commissioned by the Anchorage Opera to create new adaptations of two classic comic operas: Die Fledermaus by Johann Strauss, and The Impresario by Wolfgang Amadeus Mozart. The Polar Bat transports Strauss's comic masterpiece from Vienna to Anchorage, Alaska, where Hollywood Producers are holding auditions for the latest Alaskan Reality TV show. It premiered at the Anchorage Opera in 2014, in a production that featured a dog sled team from the Iditarod. The Impresario, which premiered in 2015, placed Mozart in the role of the impresario as he fights to bring his new opera to the stage while balancing the demands of business and art.

== Personal life ==
Brevoort is married to actor Chuck Cooper.

== List of works ==
=== Plays ===
- The Drolls (2020)
- The Gorn Galaxy (2020)
- My Lord, What a Night (2019)
- The Comfort Team (2012)
- The Blue-Sky Boys (2009)
- The Velvet Weapon (2014)
- The Cheechako Treatment (2008)
- The Poetry of Pizza (2007)
- The Women of Lockerbie (2003)
- Blue Moon Over Memphis (2001)
- Into the Fire (2000)
- Signs of Life (1990)
- Last Frontier Club (1987)

=== Musicals ===
- Goodbye My Island with David Friedman (2004)
- King Island Christmas with David Friedman (1999)
- Coyote Goes Salmon Fishing with Scott Davenport Richards (1998)

=== Operas ===
- Quamino's Map with Errollyn Wallen (2022)
- The Knock with Aleksandra Vrebalov (2020)
- Dinner 4 3 with Michael Ching (2020)
- Murasaki's Moon with Michi Wiancko (2019)
- Albert Nobbs with Patrick Soluri (2018)
- Steal a Pencil for Me with Gerald Cohen (2012)
- Embedded with Patrick Soluri (2011)
- Altezura with Aleksandra Vrebalov (2008)
- The Polar Bat, a new adaptation of Die Fledermaus (2014)
- The Impresario, a new libretto of Mozart's comic opera for the Anchorage Opera (2015)

=== Screenplays ===
- Mexico in Alaska (1999)
- Covered Dishes (1997)

== Teaching ==
Brevoort is a teacher of playwriting, musical theatre and opera. She taught in the Columbia University MFA Playwriting program from 2004 to 2024 and Goddard College's MFA in Creative Writing from 2004 to 2021. She continues to teach in the NYU Graduate Musical Theatre Writing Program, where she has been teaching since 1998.

Brevoort also works in the opera and musical theatre fields as an educator. She served as an artistic mentor to the NBO Musical Theatre festival in Nairobi, Kenya, founded by Eric Wainaina to create new musicals written by Kenyan composers and writers from 2018 to 2021. She served as the Librettist Mentor for the Washington National Opera's "American Opera Initiative" at the Kennedy Center from 2024 to 2025 and 2026–27. She is also the Librettist Mentor for the Seattle Opera's Creation Lab. and the American Lyric Theater's Composer Librettist Development Program In 2024, she was appointed a Fulbright Specialist in theatre, musical theatre and opera by the US State Department.

== Publications ==
=== Plays ===
- Blue Moon Over Memphis. Waseda Foundation, Tokyo, Japan, 2024
- The Poetry of Pizza & The Velvet Weapon: two comedies by Deborah Brevoort, with introductions by Maggie Cahill & Benny Sato Ambush. No Passport Press 2017
- The Women of Lockerbie & The Comfort Team: two plays by Deborah Brevoort, with introductions by Roberta Levitow and Chris Hanna, No Passport Press, 2014
- Signs of Life, Samuel French, 2007
- The Women of Lockerbie, Dramatists Play Service, 2005.
- Into the Fire, Samuel French, 2000.
- The Women of Lockerbie, Alexander S. Onassis Public Benefit Foundation, (Onassis International Cultural Prizes Committee) Athens, Greece 2001 (in English & Greek)

=== Anthologies ===
- Blue Moon Over Memphis, a Noh Drama about Elvis Presley, in "Intercultural Japanese Noh Theatre: Texts & Analyses of English-Language Noh" edited by Richard Emmert & Ashley Thorpe, Bloomsbury Methuen (London), 2024.
- The Women of Lockerbie in "Il Teatro e la Pietas (Theatre & Pietas)," Universita degli Studi di Trento, Italy, 2017, by Kiara Pipino. (In Italian.)
- Blue Moon Over Memphis, Applause Books in "The Best American Short Plays," 2006.
- Blue Moon Over Memphis, in the Journal of the Noh Research Archives, Musashino University, Tokyo, Japan 2004. (In Japanese & English)
- The Women of Lockerbie, in New Dramatists 2001 Anthology, Smith & Kraus, 2002
- The Women of Lockerbie, in "Dialog," the theatre journal of the International Theatre Institute of Poland, 2003. (In Polish)

== Honors and awards ==
- New Jersey Council on the Arts playwriting fellowships, 2025, 2018, 2007
- Campbell Opera Librettist Prize from Opera America, 2023
- New York Foundation on the Arts (NYFA) Playwriting Fellowship, 2002
- Admitted to New Dramatists, 1994
- Silver medal, Onassis International Playwriting Competition for The Women of Lockerbie
- Kennedy Center Fund for New American Plays Award for The Women of Lockerbie
- Frederick Loewe Award in Musical Theatre for Coyote Goes Salmon Fishing and King Island Christmas
- Paul Green Award (National Theatre Conference) for musical book writing
- L. Arnold Weissberger Award for Into the Fire
- Jane Chambers Award for Signs of Life
- Performing Artist/Writer Fellowship, American Antiquarian Society
