= Boy Gets Girl =

Theatrical drama

- Written by: Rebecca Gilman
- Characters: Theresa Bedell; Tony Ross; Howard Siegel; Mercer Stevens; Harriet; Det. Madeleine Beck; Les Kennkat
- Original language: English
- Genre: Drama
- Setting: various locales in New York City, in the present

Premiere
- Date premiered: March 13, 2000
- Place premiered: Goodman Theatre, Chicago, Illinois

Boy Gets Girl is a 2000 play by Rebecca Gilman. The play received its first production at the Goodman Theatre in Chicago in 2000.

Boy Gets Girl uses the story of what happens when a blind date turns into a living nightmare to examine stalking, sexism and the nature of the idea of romantic pursuit. Theresa Bedell is a smart, successful woman in her 30s, who writes for an upscale literary New York magazine. She is utterly devoted to her work and struggles with relationships.

== Production history ==
Boy Gets Girl was first performed at the Goodman Theatre, on March 13, 2000. The cast was as follows:

- Theresa Bedell - Mary Beth Fisher
- Tony Ross - Ian Lithgow
- Howard Siegel - Matt DeCaro
- Mercer Stevens - David Adkins
- Harriet - Shayna Ferm
- Det. Madeline Beck - Ora Jones
- Les Kennkat - Howard Witt

Directed by Michael Maggio, the sets were by Michael Philippi, costumes by Nan Cibula Jenkins, lights by John Culbert, sound by Michael Bodeen and Rob Milburn and Dramturgy by Susan V. Booth.

== Plot ==
A friend sets Theresa up on a blind date with a nice guy named Tony who works in the computer industry. It is awkward, but not too awkward as Theresa accepts a second date. (They even find a couple of things in common, such as both being from the Midwest.) By the end of this date, she realizes that he is not right for her and politely excuses herself from the date. Tony continues to intrude further into Theresa’s life, with unexpected visits to Theresa’s office and unsettling phone messages at her home. Theresa starts to worry as she realizes that Tony knows where she lives. At her co-worker's urging, she calls the police, but when Officer Beck investigates, Theresa realizes there is not much that the police can do. Beck suggests moving out of her apartment and changing her name. Despite all her efforts to avoid him by hiding in her work and opening up to her colleagues, she eventually realizes that he has and will always have control over her life. She eventually loses her identity, as she changes her name and moves out of New York City to Denver to take a newspaper job there. On the night she leaves, Theresa believes she catches a glimpse of Tony watching her once again.

== Rebecca Gilman on Tony ==
"With Boy Gets Girl I felt that Tony would become scarier if we didn’t see him. So if he was somehow out there, our imagination of him and of what he had become would be a lot scarier than the reality of him especially because I wanted him to be played by a very likeable actor."

== Notable productions ==
- Goodman Theater, Chicago, 2000. Directed by Michael Maggio; starring Mary Beth Fisher.
- Off-Broadway January 30, 2001 to April 8, 2001, presented by the Manhattan Theatre Club. Chicago cast and production, supervised by Lynne Meadow.
- Royal Court Theatre, London, 2001. Directed by Ian Rickson; starring Katrin Cartlidge.
- Dublin May 2003 produced by AboutFACE Theatre Company at the Civic Theatre, Tallaght.
- Northwestern University, Evanston, Illinois, 2006. Directed by Jason Tyne-Zimmerman
- Black Swan State Theatre Company, 2012. Directed by Adam Mitchell
- Wind Mill Grass Theatre, Hong Kong, 2018. Directed by Octavian Chan
- The Actor's Collective @ The Phoenix Theatre, San Francisco, October 2004. Directed by Mei Ann Teo.

== Awards and nominations ==
- 2001 Outer Critics Circle Award Nomination, John Gassner Award, Rebecca Gilman
- 2001 Lucille Lortel Award:
  - Outstanding Actress, Mary Beth Fisher (nominee)
  - Outstanding Featured Actor, Howard Witt (nominee)
- 2002 Olivier Award for Best New Play (nomination)
