= Circle Theatre Chicago =

American theatre company

- Formation: 1985
- Type: Theatre group
- Location: 1010 Madison St, Oak Park, IL 60302

Circle Theatre Chicago founded in 1985 by Wayne Buidens, Joe Bass, and Karen Skinner is a theatre company in Oak Park and Chicago, Illinois. They chose the name "Circle Theatre" to represent both Circle Avenue (Forest Park's main thoroughfare) and the concept of infinity. They began their work began in public buildings, and then settled in a church in 1987. A few years later, a fire destroyed the church and forced Circle to find its own space at 7300 Madison Street in Forest Park, Illinois. The company was led by Karen Skinner until 1998 when she turned the artistic leadership over to her daughter Alena Murguia, and two company members Tony Vezner and Greg Kolack. The company is noted for producing new works; Rebecca Gilman's The Glory of Living had its premier at Circle in 1996.

Kevin Bellie (born May 8, 1971) was artistic director from 2003 to 2012. Bob Knuth was Producing Director and resident Scenic/Graphic Designer for Circle Theatre Chicago in Forest Park from 2001 to 2013.

In 2010, the theatre group relocated to Madison Street Theatre.

As of 2023, Madison Street Theater no longer hosts the theatre group.
