= Bakersfield P.D. =

- Genre: Sitcom; police comedy
- Created by: Larry Levin
- Written by: Richard Dresser; Stephen Godchaux
- Directed by: Michael Engler; Bryan Gordon
- Starring: Giancarlo Esposito; Ron Eldard; Chris Mulkey; Tony Plana; Jack Hallett; Brian Doyle-Murray
- Theme music composer: Carl Finch
- Opening theme: "Busy Office Rhumba" performed by Brave Combo
- Composer: Joseph Vitarelli
- Country of origin: United States
- Original language: English
- No. of seasons: 1
- No. of episodes: 17

Production
- Executive producer: Larry Levin
- Camera setup: Single-camera
- Running time: 30 minutes
- Production companies: Rock Island Productions; Touchstone Television

Original release
- Network: Fox
- Release: September 14, 1993 – August 18, 1994

Bakersfield P.D. is an American television sitcom that aired on Fox from September 14, 1993, until August 18, 1994.

The show was based in the police department of the city of Bakersfield, California. It was shot with naturalistic lighting and without a laugh track. The show's theme song, "Busy Office Rhumba," was written by Mark Mothersbaugh and performed by Brave Combo.

Fox canceled the show after one season, citing low ratings. The cable channel Trio reran the show under its "Brilliant But Cancelled" umbrella.

== Cast ==
- Giancarlo Esposito as Det. Paul Gigante
- Ron Eldard as Det. Wade Preston
- Chris Mulkey as Denny Boyer
- Tony Plana as Luke Ramirez
- Jack Hallett as Capt. Aldo Stiles
- Brian Doyle-Murray as Sgt. Phil Hampton

== Episodes ==
No.	Title	Directed by	Written by	Original release date	Prod. code
1	"Pilot"	Dean Parisot	Larry Levin	September 14, 1993	P401
Washington DC police detective Paul Gigante (Giancarlo Esposito), who's half black and half Italian, moves to Bakersfield, California, where he's teamed with a white partner (Ron Eldard) obsessed with African-American culture. Paul gets a rude welcome when his new partner commandeers his car.
2	"The Imposter"	Dean Parisot	Larry Levin & Jeff Nathanson	September 21, 1993	P404
Paul and Wade try to track down a con artist with the help of a star-struck volunteer police artist (Laura Innes), who captures the likenesses of suspects – and celebrities. Guest starring Allan Wasserman as Dr. Harbor.
3	"Unsolved Mysteries of Love"	Dean Parisot	Larry Levin	September 28, 1993	P403
While he investigates a burglary with Paul, a young woman (Marianna Elliott) steals Wade's heart. Meanwhile, Captain Stiles tries to weasel out of the department's blood drive. Guest starring Patrick Kilpatrick as Patrick.
4	"The Snake Charmer"	Bryan Gordon	Dennis Klein & Richard Dresser	October 5, 1993	P405
Sgt Hampton's out of town, so an indecisive Capt Stiles decides to make Paul his right-hand man – and decision-maker – for a day. Guest starring Diane Delano as Jessie, Marnie Crossen as Woman, and Rolando Molina as Criminal.
5	"The Poker Game"	Dean Parisot	Dennis Klein	October 12, 1993	P406
Wade hosts a police poker game in which Paul raises the stakes, then the ire of some fellow officers when he wins. Guest starring Todd Field as Lewis, John Fleck as Doug, and Andrew Craig as Prisoner.
6	"The Bust"	Dean Parisot	Richard Dresser	October 19, 1993	P402
Paul tells Wade the very private reason he had for moving his family to Bakersfield, and it doesn't take much detective work for the other officers to learn the secret.
7	"The Ex-Partner"	Nick Marck	Story by : Richard Dresser; Teleplay by : Dennis Klein & Jeff Nathanson	October 26, 1993	P408
Wade is jealous when Paul's former partner (Bill Nunn) comes to town, and Capt Stiles ponders the future amid rumors that Sgt Hampton may retire.
8	"Bakersfield Madam"	Nick Marck	Richard Dresser	November 2, 1993	P407
During a sting, Capt Stiles hides in a restroom rather than deal with a madam's black book containing the names of several influential johns. Guest starring Richard Bradford as Mayor, Sherrie Rose as Kimberly, and John Blevins as Guy.
9	"Cable Does Not Pay"	Ken Kwapis	Dennis Klein & Jeff Nathanson & Richard Dresser	November 9, 1993	P409
Wade tried to persuade Paul to lighten up. Meanwhile, Boyer takes the detective's test, but doesn't detect a hostage situation in the captain's office. Guest starring William H. Macy as Russell, and Alan Royal as Childs.
10	"The Gift"	Dean Parisot	Jeff Nathanson	November 16, 1993	P410
Wade is overwhelmed when one of his crime-show heroes, Joe Santos (Det Becker on "The Rockford Files"), visits the station. Meanwhile, Paul feels the strain on his long-distance marriage. Guest starring Norm Skaggs as Leo, and Mark Boone Jr. as Ed.
11	"The President's Coming"	Ken Kwapis	Larry Levin & Jeff Nathanson	November 23, 1993	P411
Most of the department is left out of the loop when Secret Service agents arrive to protect the Presidential motorcade as it passes through town. Guest starring Willie Carpenter as Agent Wilder and Jeremy Roberts as Agent Ketron.
12	"A Bullet for Stiles"	Michael Engler	Dennis Klein & Jeff Nathanson & Larry Levin	November 30, 1993	P412
A thief (Jonathon Gries) is released from prison and comes to Bakersfield to exact revenge on Capt Stiles, the cop who caught him ten years earlier. Guest starring Beth Grant as Donna, and Christine Estabrook as Ann Lester.
13	"Lucky 13"	Dean Parisot	Larry Levin and Dennis Klein & Jeff Nathanson	December 21, 1993	P413
Denny (Chris Mulkey) is suspended without pay and resorts to selling underwear from his car. Meanwhile, Paul and Wade attempt to solve a cow-napping. Guest starring Melora Walters as Marnie and Beth Grant as Donna.
14	"Arms and the Men"	Ken Kwapis	Dennis Klein	July 7, 1994	P414
First up: a severed arm is found in the city's water supply.
15	"There Goes the Neighborhood"	Tim Hunter	Larry Levin	July 21, 1994	P415
Denny's happy that Paul is looking for a home of his own, until he hears that Paul may buy a house in his neighborhood. Guest starring Brandon Maggart as Uncle Powell, and Ramon Franco as Tom Tom.
16	"The Psychic and the C-Cup"	Dean Parisot	Story by : Peter Giambalvo; Teleplay by : Jeff Nathanson	July 28, 1994	P416
Wade consults a visionary to help him locate a missing psychic; Luke proves his manliness to Denny; and Capt Stiles attends a mayor's luncheon. Guest starring Jodie Markell as Brenda, John Glen Bishop as Kyle, and Gloria Dorson as Shelly Krane.
17	"Last One into the Water"	Dean Parisot	Dennis Klein	August 18, 1994	P417
Paul discovers Wade's caring side; Denny picks a fight with some firefighters; and Capt Stiles is in hot water over a new spa. Guest starring Dan Castellaneta as Darian.

== Ratings ==
- 1° Season: #104 – 4.26 rating
