= M. Elizabeth Osborn =

American theatre critic (1941–1993)

M[argaret] Elizabeth (Betty) Osborn, (born in Rome, Georgia on February 19, 1941; died in Virginia in 1993, age 52), was a playwright, author, theater director, critic, editor, and educator. From the 1980s to early 1990s, she was a prominent member of the American Theatre Critics Association (ATCA). She worked for the Theater Communications Group (TCG). Osborn grew up in Gainesville, Florida, and graduated from college Phi Beta Kappa.

Her work on behalf of emerging playwrights has been honored since her death by ATCA's establishment of the M. Elizabeth Osborn Award. It is granted annually to a promising new American dramatist.

== Dramaturg in Virginia ==
Osborn received her PhD in English from the University of Pennsylvania. In the 1970s, she was an assistant professor of theatre at St. Mary's College of Maryland. While on leave she was accepted as a student of directing in the Virginia Museum Theater Conservatory. From that base, she helped to pioneer the resident professional theater movement in Richmond, where she served as a "Dramaturg"—at the time a relatively new position in American regional theatre—of the Repertory Company of the Virginia Museum Theater (VMT).

== "Betty-O," a supportive critic ==
In the 1980s, Osborn moved to New York City to join the staff of Theatre Communications Group (TCG), where she focused on editing and criticism. She was known to friends as "Betty-O". In her capacity as a theater critic, Osborn leaned away from the acerbic and caustic, toward support and encouragement. She was always highly appreciative of theater artists, as typified by her letter in tribute to her colleague, the late director John Hirsch in the New York Times.

Osborn was especially known for promoting and fostering little-known playwrights. She used her influence to encourage major directors and playhouses to produce their works more frequently and consistently.

=== Support of traditionally marginalized voices and works in theater ===
From the 1980s to her death in the early '90s, Osborn sought to bring attention to marginalized theater voices. Her emphasis on new plays by Hispanic authors and on dramatic works dealing with the AIDS crisis is expressed in her critical anthologies. Her book On New Ground focused on late-20th century Latino playwrights.

==== Writings on the effects of AIDS on American stage theater ====
Osborn showed how American theatre artists confronted the plague of AIDS in her book The Way We Live Now.

== M. Elizabeth Osborn Award ==
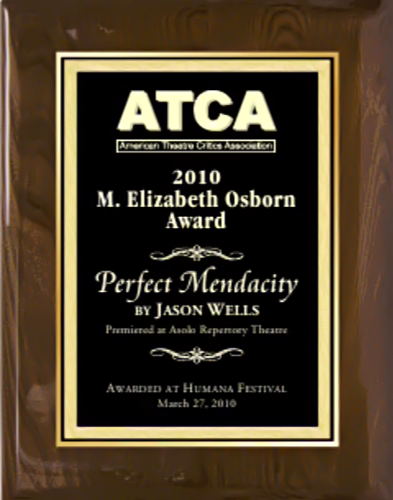
The Osborn Award, a plaque shown here for Jason Wells, 2010 winner

The M. Elizabeth Osborn Award was established in 1993 by the American Theater Critics Association (ATCA) to honor Osborn by continuing her mission of recognizing outstanding but little known authors. Colleagues recall how she would politely but persistently urge producers to mount productions of untried authors.

The prize includes a monetary grant. The "Osborn" is conferred on a new American playwright at the Humana Festival of New American Plays held each year at the Actors Theater of Louisville.

Seattle-based playwright Keri Healey was the 2013 Osborn Award winner, honored for her play Torso. Darren Canady, an assistant professor at the University of Kansas (now a full professor), received the award in 2012 for his play about rural African-American life, Brothers of the Dust. Among other Osborn laureates are Rebecca Gilman, Los Angeles author Dan O'Brien, and Brooklyn playwright J.T. Rogers.

== Books ==
- Osborn, M. Elizabeth (Editor), The Way We Live Now: American Plays and the AIDS Crisis, plays by Terrence McNally, Tony Kushner, Christopher Durang, Lanford Wilson, Susan Sontag, Harry Kondoleon, David Greenspan, and Paula Vogel. Paperback, 304 pages, Published January 1, 1990, by Theatre Communications Group, ISBN 1559360054; Lambda Literary Foundation Award for AIDS (1990)
- Osborn (Author), On New Ground: contemporary Hispanic-American plays, Paperback, 288 pages, Published December 1, 1987, by Theatre Communications Group ISBN 0930452682
- Osborn (Author), John Hirsch at Yale, Duke University Press, doi: 10.1215/01610775-21-1_and_2-120 Theater 1990 Volume 21, Number 1
- Osborn (Author), Dramatists Sourcebook, 1986–87, Theatre Communications Group, December 1986, ISBN 9780930452575
