= Premiere Stages =

Premiere Stages is the professional Equity theater company in residence at Kean University.

== Background ==
Founded in 2004, Premiere sponsors the Premiere Play Festival, a source for developing new plays. The winner of the festival receives a full-scale production as part of Premiere's season. The second-place finisher receives a staged reading to contribute to its further development. Apart from the festival winner, Premiere produces new works by established playwrights as well as established plays such as the 2006 Pulitzer Prize winning play Rabbit Hole by David Lindsay-Abaire. Premiere's presentation of Lost Boy Found in Whole Foods, by Tammy Ryan was produced in collaboration with the Kean Human Rights Institute and Newark's Darfur Rehabilitation Project.

Premiere Stages is a member of Theatre Communications Group. It is a member company of the New Jersey Theatre Alliance.

== Selected alumni ==
The following is a list of playwrights who have developed work through Premiere Stages.

- Keith Josef Adkins
- George Brant
- Deborah Brevoort
- Martin Casella
- James Christy
- Hal Corley
- Kate Cortesi
- Chris Cragin-Day
- Gino DiIorio
- Sarah Gancher
- Nick Gandiello
- Craig Garcia
- Keelay Gipson
- Keli Goff
- Kathryn Grant
- Lindsey Ferrentino
- Willy Holtzman
- Kait Kerrigan
- Kimber Lee
- Rogelio Martínez
- Dominique Morisseau
- Deneen Reynolds-Knott
- Tammy Ryan
- Jeff Talbott
