= Benched (film) =

- Film poster
- Directed by: Robert Deaton; George Flanigen
- Written by: Richard Dresser
- Based on: Rounding Third by Richard Dresser
- Produced by: Fred Roos
- Starring: John C. McGinley; Garret Dillahunt
- Production company: FR Productions
- Release date: August 17, 2018
- Country: United States
- Language: English

Benched is a 2018 American sports drama film directed by Robert Deaton and George Flanigen and written by Richard Dresser, based on his play Rounding Third. The film stars John C. McGinley and Garret Dillahunt. Fred Roos was the producer, while Deaton and Flanigen made their feature film directing debut. It was released on August 17, 2018.

== Cast ==
- John C. McGinley as Don
- Garret Dillahunt as Michael
- Darius Willis as Pete
- Carter Wallace as Rusty
- Jlynn Johnson as Carolyn
- Graham Schneider as Jimmy
- Keith Jamal Evans as Kahil
- Brogan Hall as Timmy
- Reid Murray as Opposing Player
- Hadley Maxwell as Opposing Player

== Production ==
Principal photography on the film began in July 2015 in Nashville, Tennessee.
