= Artists Repertory Theatre =

Theatrical troupe in the United States

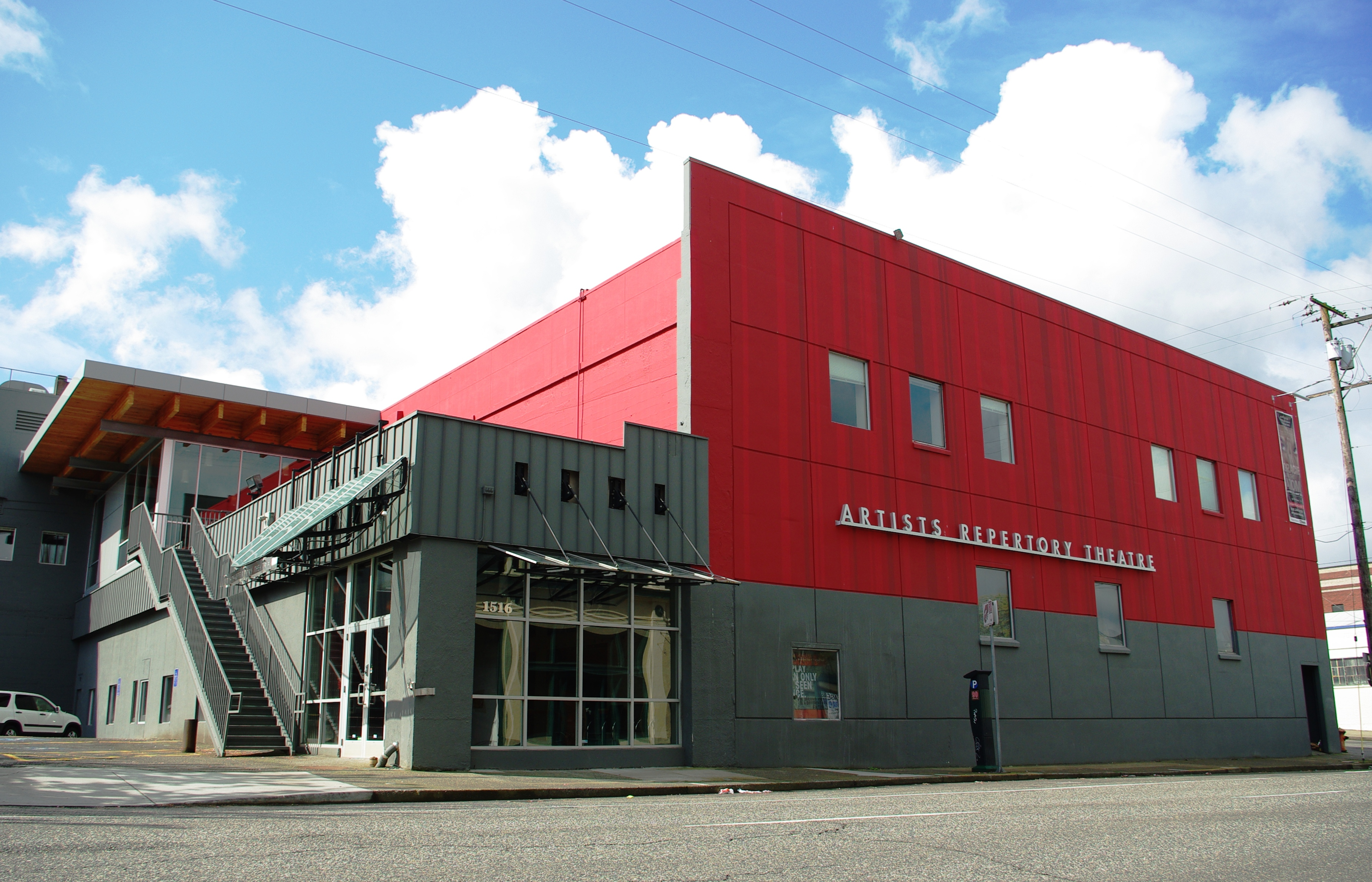
- Artists Rep's theater building
- Abbreviation: ART
- Nickname: Artists Rep
- Formation: 1982
- Type: 501(c)(3) non-profit organization
- Location(s): 1515 SW Morrison Street Portland, Oregon 97205
- Managing Director: Aiyana Cunningham
- Website: artistsrep.org

Artists Repertory Theatre (Artists Rep) is a professional non-profit theatre located in Portland, Oregon, United States, established in 1982.

In addition to producing six to eight productions in Portland annually, the company runs special programming and collaborations. Operating on a repertory or stock company model, their artistic agenda includes the ArtsHub campus collective and Table|Room|Stage initiative for new work.

== History ==
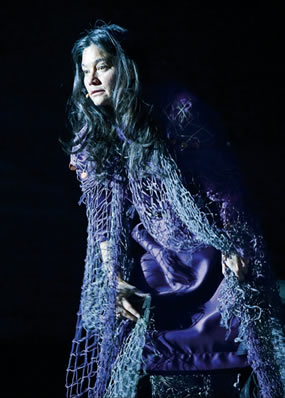
Chenoa Egawa portrays one of the ghost narrators in The Ghosts of Celilo

When it opened, it operated out of a space it rented from the downtown YWCA It located to the current location in 1997.

While the Traveling Lantern Theatre Company and Polaris Dance Theatre are no longer members of the ArtsHub, as of 2019, Hand2Mouth Theatre, the LineStorm Playwrights collective, Portland Actors Conservatory, and the Fertile Ground Festival for new work are facilitated by the venue. This ArtsHub initiative won the 2016 Light A Fire Award for inspiring creativity.

By mid-2019, architectural plans were released by May for the new two-theater complex with room for the ArtsHub companies, as well as a $10 million capital campaign. The company's 2019–20 season was "On Tour", renting spaces across the city with Imago Theatre, Portland Opera, the Tiffany Center, Portland Center Stage, and Portland State University to put up the skeleton six-show season.

== Ensemble ==
ART has operated on a repertory company model since 2008, meaning that they employ a dedicated stable of actors, playwrights, and other theatre-makers throughout a season rather than casting anew for each individual production. The company varies in size over time, sometimes as large as twenty-seven members.

== Productions ==
=== 2017/2018 season ===
- Magellanica by E.M. Lewis, world premiere National Endowment for the Arts gave a $10,000 grant to support its premiere.
