= Contemporary American Theater Festival =

Coordinates: 39°26′11″N 77°48′30″W

- Festival Logo
- Location: Shepherdstown, West Virginia, United States
- Founded: 1991
- Founded by: Ed Herendeen
- Type of play: New American plays
- Festival date: July of each year
- Website: http://www.catf.org/

The Contemporary American Theater Festival (CATF) is an American annual professional theatre festival held at Shepherd University, located in Shepherdstown, West Virginia. According to the New York Times (in 2015), it is one of "50 essential summer festivals". In 2016, Germany's World Guide identified the festival as one of the "Top 10 theatre festivals not to miss this summer". A representative of the Theatre Communications Group in its publication American Theatre stated that "(CATF's) forward focus has helped ... change the American theatre conversation, bringing new voices and pressing topics to the stage ..."

The Festival specializes in premieres and second or third productions of new plays, currently producing six plays each summer in rotating repertory.

== History ==
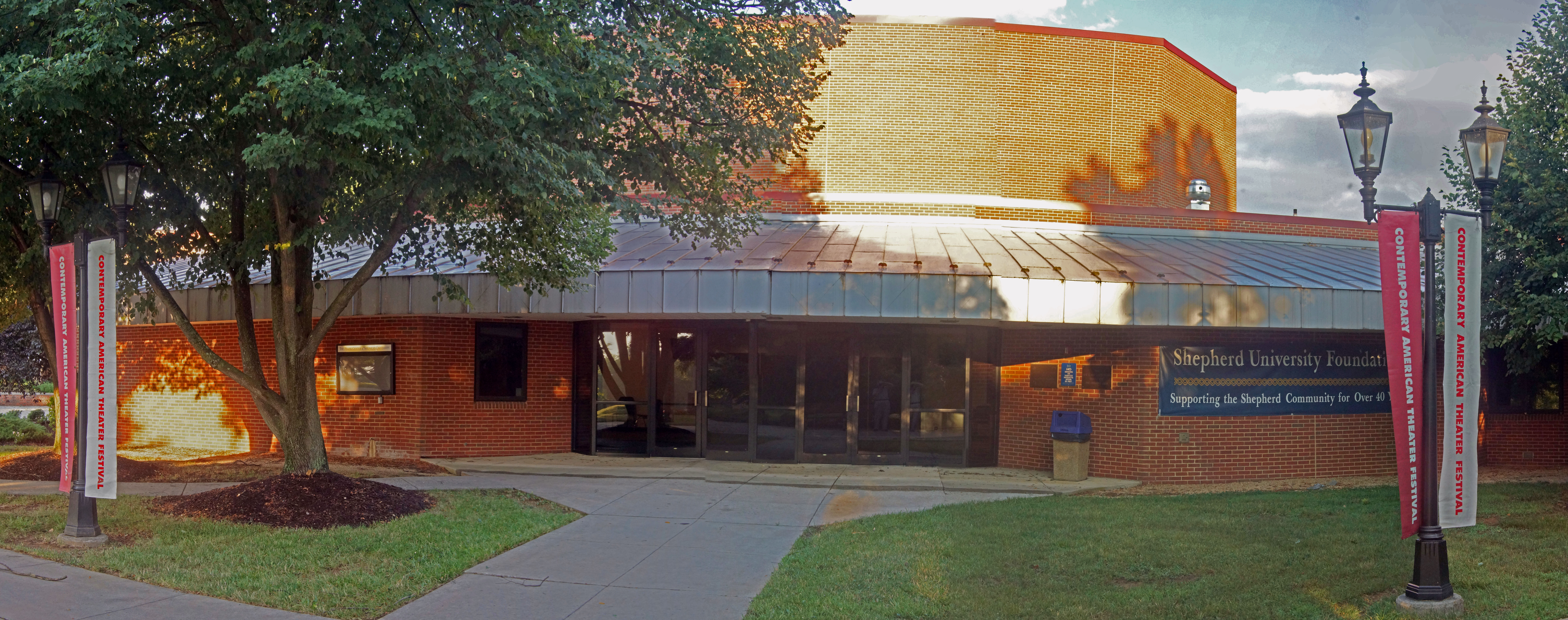
The CATF Frank Center Stage

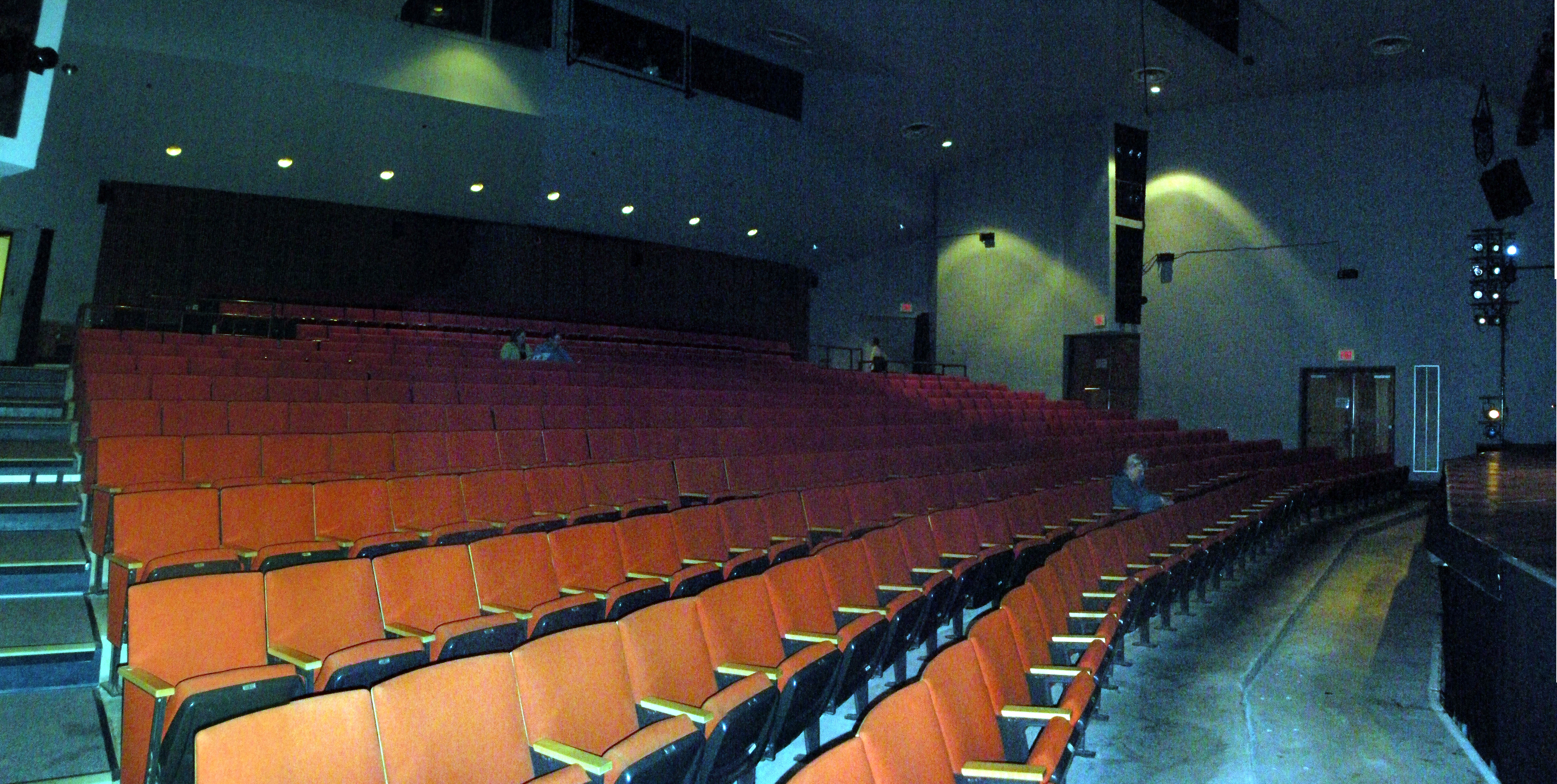
The CATF Frank Center Stage interior

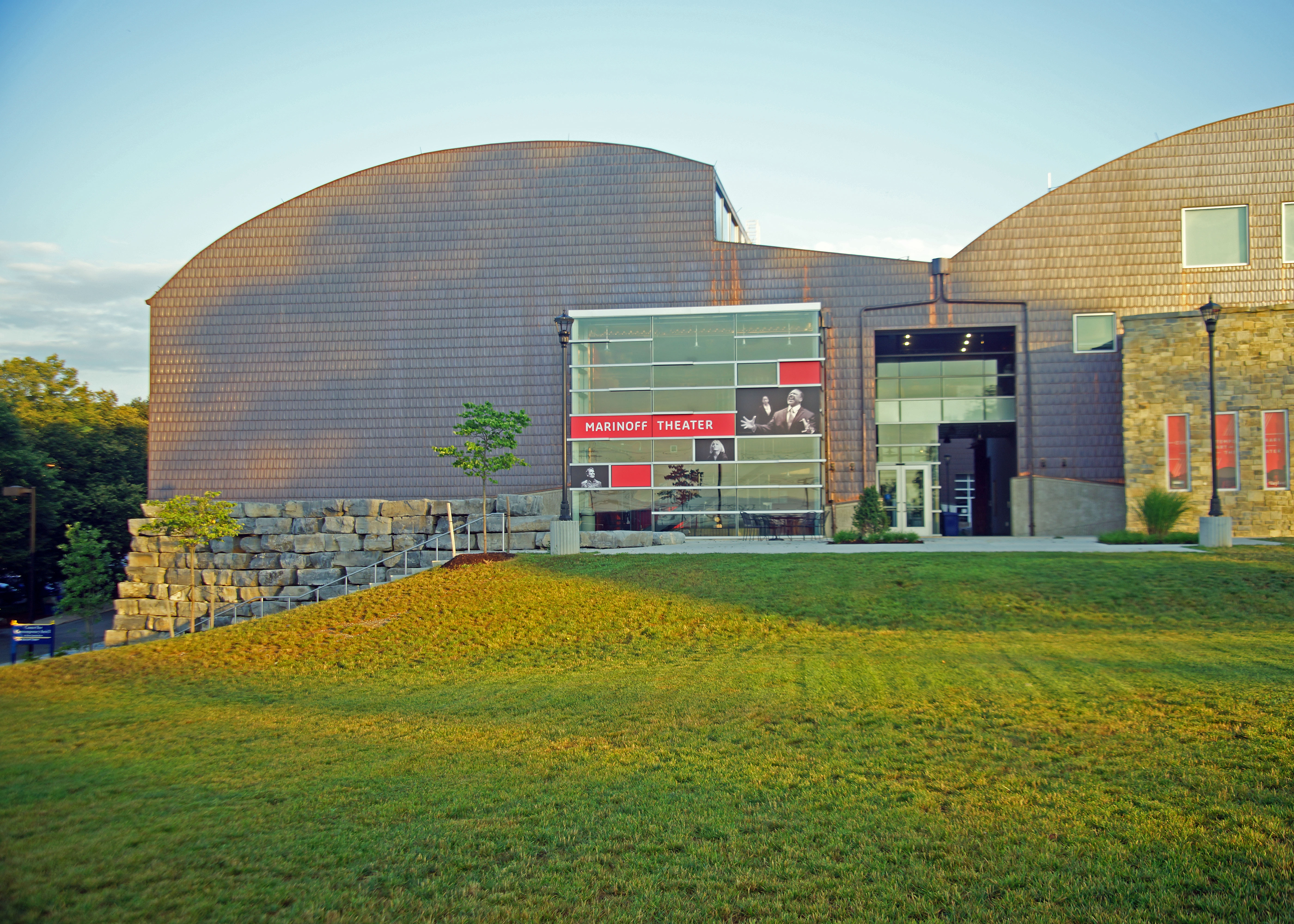
The CATF Marinoff Theater exterior located in the Contemporary Arts Center II

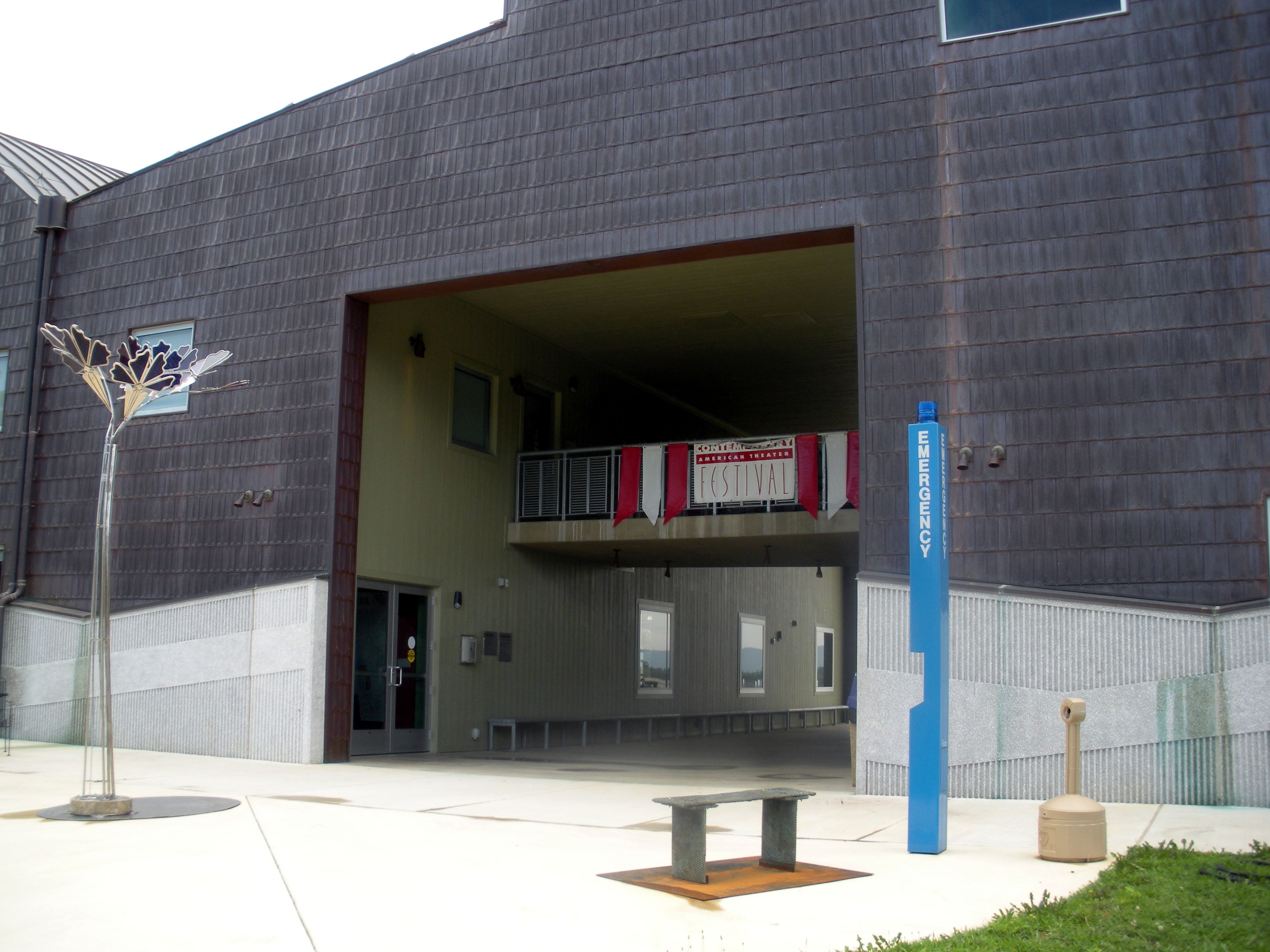
The CATF Contemporary Arts Center I entrance

A 2010 NPR segment stated: "For 20 years, in the oldest town in West Virginia, new plays have had a home and a loyal audience. The Contemporary American Theater Festival at Shepherd University is a dream for the writers of those plays."

The festival was started in 1991 "on a wing and a prayer and a $90,000 budget" by producing director Ed Herendeen. It was modeled after the Williamstown Theatre Festival, located in Williamstown, Massachusetts. It has the goal of producing and developing new American theater, specifically plays that deal with contemporary issues and strive to challenge and entertain audiences. In addition to finding new scripts which could be either premieres or on a second/third production, the festival has also commissioned works since 1998. Through the summer of 2013, the festival has produced 100 plays, by 73 American playwrights, including 37 world premieres, 9 of which were commissioned. It had an operating budget for 2013 of $1 million. In 2017 The New York Times picked it as "one of the top festivals in theater ... that we think you should see this spring and summer around the country".

The COVID-19 pandemic in 2020 caused officials to scrap the festival and defer to 2021.

== Facilities ==
Housed on the university's campus, the CATF uses three performance spaces. The first is the 416 seat Frank Center for the Arts Stage, a conventional proscenium performance space without a curtain. The second is The Stanley C. and Shirley A. Marinoff Theater, a 180-seat flexible seating space, located in the recently completed Center For Contemporary Arts II(CCA II). This space replaced the Studio Theater, an adapted space in Sara H Cree Hall. The third space is a smaller adapted black box space in Room 112 of Center For Contemporary Arts I. The CATF scene shop and costume shop are also located in the new CCA II.

== Notable productions ==
- Uncanny Valley, 2014 Festival

As part of the National New Play Network Rolling World Premieres, CATF transferred their production to 59E59 Theaters in New York City from October 2 – 26. The production received favorable reviews.

- H2O, 2013 Festival

This production was one of six finalists for the 2014 Harold and Mimi Steinberg/ATCA New Play Award, recognizing playwrights for the best scripts that premiered professionally outside New York City during 2013

- Gidion's Knot, 2012 Festival

This world premiere production received a Harold and Mimi Steinberg/American Theatre Critics Association New Play citation as one of the top three new plays of 2012. The play has been published by Dramatists Play Service and had 14 productions scheduled for 2014 around the USA. According to American Theatre magazine, it is the 11th most-produced play in the 2013-2014 theater season.

- Farragut North, 2009 Festival

This play was adapted for the screen as The Ides of March starring George Clooney and Ryan Gosling.

- My Name is Rachel Corrie, 2007 Festival.

This production was notable because of the controversy surrounding the play (see the play's article in Wikipedia for details of the controversy). The festival playbill contained a two-page ad, "My Name is Rachel Corrie Does Not Tell the Whole Story: Don't Be Misled", which included photos of six other women named Rachel who were killed by Palestinian suicide bombers. A member of the festival's board of trustees resigned in protest and several regular patrons decided not to attend the festival in response to the selection of this work. The Artistic Director "was flooded with letters urging the board members to remove the play". The actual production was without incident and no drop in attendance.

- Compleat Female Stage Beauty, 1999 Festival

This production was notable as it was one of the early works commissioned by the festival which then went on to be regularly produced and was adapted by the playwright (Jeffrey Hatcher) into a film version Stage Beauty starring Claire Danes, Billy Crudup, and Tom Wilkinson.

- Carry the Tiger to the Mountain, 1998 Festival

This play by Cherylene Lee – and the festival's first commissioned work – focused on the beating death of Vincent Chin in 1982 Detroit. The play's production became the impetus for a state-wide discussion on race and served as the backdrop to the governor's year-long efforts on this issue, which began with a town-hall discussion, in the theater, following a production of the play. The festival was recognized for its role as catalyst for this important dialogue with the 1999 "Governor's Award for Excellence in the Arts."

== Complete production history ==
The following is a complete list of the festival's productions.

2019 Festival
My Lord, What a Night by Deborah Brevoort*^; Support Group for Men by Ellen Fairey; Wrecked by Greg Kalleres*; A Welcome Guest: A Psychotic Fairy Tale by Michael Weller**; Chester Bailey by Joseph Dougherty; Antonio' s Song / I was dreaming of a son by Dael Orlandersmith and Antonio Edwards Suarez*
2018 Festival
The Cake by Bekah Brunstetter; Berta, Berta by Angelica Cheri*; Memoirs of a Forgotten Man by D.W. Gregory*^; Thirst by C.A. Johnson*; A Late Morning (in America) with Ronald Reagan by Michael Weller*; The House on the Hill by Amy E. Witting*.
2017 Festival
The Niceties by Eleanor Burgess, Welcome To Fear City by Kara Lee Corthron,^{*}, Wild Horses by Allison Gregory^{*}, Byhalia, Mississippi by Evan Linder, Everything Is Wonderful by Chelsea Marcantel^{*}, We Will Not Be Silent by David Meyers^{*}.
2016 Festival
pen/man/ship by Christina Anderson, Not Medea by Allison Gregory*^, The Wedding Gift by Chisa Hutchinson^{*}, 20th Century Blues by Susan Miller^{*}, The Second Girl by Ronan Noone.
2015 Festival
World Builders by Johnna Adams^{*}, Everything You Touch by Sheila Callaghan, On Clover Road by Steven Dietz^{*}, We Are Pussy Riot by Barbara Hammond**, The Full Catastrophe by Michael Weller^{*}, based on the novel by David Carkeet
2014 Festival
The Ashes Under Gait City by Christina Anderson^{*}, One Night by Charles Fuller, Uncanny Valley by Thomas Gibbons*^, North of the Boulevard by Bruce Graham, Dead and Breathing by Chisa Hutchinson^{*}.
2013 Festival
A Discourse on the Wonders of the Invisible World by Liz Duffy Adams^{*}, Modern Terrorism, or They Who Want to Kill Us and How We Learn to Love Them by Jon Kern, H2O by Jane Martin^{**}, Heartless by Sam Shepard, Scott and Hem in the Garden of Allah by Mark St. Germain^{**.}
2012 Festival
Gidion’s Knot by Johnna Adams^{*}, The Exceptionals by Bob Clyman, In a Forest, Dark and Deep by Neil LaBute, Captors by Evan M. Wiener, Barcelona by Bess Wohl^{*}
2011 Festival
From Prague by Kyle Bradstreet^{*}, Race by David Mamet, Ages of the Moon by Sam Shepard, We Are Here by Tracy Thorne, The Insurgents by Lucy Thurber^{**}
2010 Festival
Breadcrumbs by Jennifer Haley^{*}, The Eelwax Jesus 3-D Pop Music Show Book & Lyrics by Max Baker, Music by Lee Sellars^{*}, Inana by Michele Lowe, Lidless by Frances Ya-Chu Cowhig, White People by J.T. Rogers
2009 Festival
Dear Sara Jane by Victor Lodato^{*}, Farragut North by Beau Willimon, Fifty Words by Michael Weller, The History of Light by Eisa Davis^{*}, Yankee Tavern by Steven Dietz
2008 Festival
The Overwhelming by J. T. Rogers, Pig Farm by Greg Kotis, Stick Fly by Lydia R. Diamond, A View of the Harbor by Richard Dresser^{*}, WRECKS by Neil LaBute
2007 Festival
1001 by Jason Grote, Lonesome Hollow by Lee Blessing^{*}, The Pursuit of Happiness by Richard Dresser, My Name is Rachel Corrie from the writings of Rachel Corrie, edited by Alan Rickman and Katharine Viner
2006 Festival
Augusta by Richard Dresser^{*}, Jazzland by Keith Glover^{**}, Mr. Marmalade by Noah Haidle, Sex, Death, and the Beach Baby by Kim Merrill^{*}
2005 Festival
The God of Hell by Sam Shepard, American Tet by Lydia Stryk^{*}, Sonia Flew by Melinda Lopez, Father Joy by Sheri Wilner^{*}, Augusta by Richard Dresser^{+}, Jazzland by Keith Glover^{++}, On the Verge or The Geography of Yearning by Eric Overmyer^{~}
2004 Festival
Homeland Security by Stuart Flack, Flag Day by Lee Blessing^{*}, Rounding Third by Richard Dresser, The Rose of Corazon: A Texas Songplay by Keith Glover**, Amazing by Brooke Berman^{~}, Father Joy by Sheri Wilner^{+}
2003 Festival
Whores by Lee Blessing^{*}, The Last Schwartz by Deborah Zoe Laufer, Bright Ideas by Eric Coble, Wilder by Erin Cressida Wilson, Flag Day by Lee Blessing^{+}, The Clandestine Crossing by Keith Glover^{+}
2002 Festival
Thief River by Lee Blessing, Silence of God by Catherine Filloux^{**}, The Late Henry Moss by Sam Shepard, Orange Flower Water by Craig Wright*, Rounding Third by Richard Dresser^{+}, Melissa Arctic by Craig Wright^{+}
2001 Festival
Tape by Stephen Belber, The Ecstasy of Saint Theresa by John Olive^{*}, The Occupation" by Harry Newman^{*}, The Pavilion by Craig Wright, Carol Mulroney by Stephen Belber^{+}, Orange Flower Water by Craig Wright^{+}, Silence of God by Catherine Filloux^{++}
2000 Festival
Hunger by Sheri Wilner*, Mary and Myra by Catherine Filloux^{*}, Miss Golden Dreams, A Play Cycle by Joyce Carol Oates*, Something in the Air by Richard Dresser
1999 Festival
Compleat Female Stage Beauty by Jeffrey Hatcher^{**}, Coyote on a Fence by Bruce Graham, Tatjana in Color by Julia Jordan*, The Water Children by Wendy MacLeod, Flo's Ho's by Julia Jordan^{++}
1998 Festival
BAFO by Tom Strelich, Carry the Tiger to the Mountain by Cherylene Lee^{**}, Gun-Shy by Richard Dresser, Interesting Times by Preston Foerder^{**}
1997 Festival
Below the Belt by Richard Dresser, Demonology by Kelley Stuart, Lighting Up the Two Year Old by Benjie Aerenson, CATF Dance Ensemble
1996 Festival
Bad Girls by Joyce Carol Oates^{*}, Octopus by Jon Klein^{*}, The Nina Variations by Steven Dietz, The Nose by Elizabeth Egloff, Tough Choices for the New Century by Jane Anderson
1995 Festival
Beti the Yeti by Jon Klein, Maggie's Riff by Jon Lipsky, Psyche Was Here by Lynne Martin^{*}, Voir Dire by Joe Sutton
1994 Festival
Forgiving Typhoid Mary by Mark St. Germain, Shooting Simone by Lynne Kaufman, Spike Heels by Theresa Rebeck, What are Tuesdays Like? by Victor Bumbalo^{*},
1993 Festival
A Contemporary Masque by Stephen Bennet, Alabama Rain by Heather McCutchen, Black by Joyce Carol Oates, Dream House by Darrah Cloud
1992 Festival
Static by Ben Siegler, Still Waters by Lynn Martin*, The Baby Dance by Jane Anderson, The Swan by Elizabeth Egloff
1991 Festival
Accelerando by Lisa Loomer, Welcome to the Moon by John Patrick Shanley

Production Notes

^{*} world premiere

^{**} world premiere; commissioned by CATF

^{^} National New Play Network Rolling World Premiere

^{+} staged reading

^{++} staged reading; commissioned by CATF

^{~} CATF Actors' Lab Workshop

== See also ==
- List of theatre festivals

== Notes ==
The plays are professionally produced using the LORT D contract of the Actors' Equity Association (AEA). The festival operates under agreements from AEA, United Scenic Artists, and the Society of Stage Directors and Choreographers.

The festival is a member of the Theatre Communications Group.

The festival is a member of the National New Play Network.

Annually, CATF holds Hostel YOUTH! - a theater immersion program for young adults (ages 14–18)

In 2013, the festival hosted the American Theatre Critics Association Annual Conference.

In 2008, the first phase of the new Center for Contemporary Arts was dedicated. Phase One houses the CATF administration offices and one of large studios has been adapted for a third performance space.

In 2013, Center for Contemporary Arts Phase Two opened, adding a 180-seat studio (black-box) theater as well as dressing room, scene shop and prop shop facilities.

A future Phase Three will contain two 250-seat theaters, one thrust stage and one end-stage.

In 2008, the festival had an economic impact of $2.1 million to the Eastern Panhandle region of West Virginia.

In 2013, the festival brought $3 million of revenue to Shepherdstown, and attracted nearly 14,000 people — primarily from the D.C. region, but also from 30-plus states and various foreign countries.

The Festival is a Blue Star Theatre - part of a collaboration between the Theatre Communications Group and Blue Star Families offering discounted admission to all military personnel and their families.
