= Matt DeCaro =

American actor (1956–2026)

- Born: April 2, 1956; Chicago, Illinois, US
- Died: April 25, 2026 (aged 70); Chicago, Illinois, US
- Education: University of Illinois Chicago
- Occupation: Actor
- Spouse: Sheila O'Callaghan
- Children: 1

Matt DeCaro (April 2, 1956 – April 25, 2026) was an American actor. He was arguably best known for his role as Correctional Officer Roy Geary on the television series Prison Break.

== Life and career ==
DeCaro was born in Chicago on April 2, 1956. He studied education at the University of Illinois Chicago and taught at the Chicago Academy for the Arts. He appeared in numerous American television series, including Crime Story, ER, Law & Order: Special Victims Unit, CSI: Crime Scene Investigation, Cold Case, NYPD Blue, 24, The Office, NCIS, Curb Your Enthusiasm, Boston Legal, House, Eli Stone, The Chicago Code, Boss, Chicago P.D., and Chicago Fire.

He also appeared in the films Richie Rich (1994), U.S. Marshals (1998), Mr. 3000 (2004), Eagle Eye (2008), Baby on Board (2009), and The Wise Kids (2011).

His stage work includes the Victory Gardens Theater's production of Symmetry and the role of Mr. Meyers in the world premiere of Rebecca Gilman's 1999 play Spinning into Butter. At the time of his death, he was part of the cast for a production of Ma Rainey’s Black Bottom at Chicago's Goodman Theatre.

DeCaro lived in the Bridgeport neighborhood of Chicago with his wife, Sheila O'Callaghan, and had a son. He died from heart failure in his home on April 25, 2026, at the age of 70.

== Filmography ==
Year	Title	Role	Notes
1994	Richie Rich	Dave Walter	
1998	U.S. Marshals	Deputy Stern	
2004	Mr. 3000	Reporter #2	
2005	Prison Break	Roy Geary	
2005	The Office	Jerry DiCanio	
2008	Eagle Eye	Stranger at Airport	
2009	Baby on Board	Judge	
2011	The Last Rites of Joe May	Chevy	
2011	The Wise Kids	Jerry	
2014	Chicago P.D.	Officer Delaney	
