= Heideman Award =

American theater award

The Heideman Award is given each year to the winner of the National Ten-Minute Play Contest, a competition hosted by Actors Theatre of Louisville. The $1,000 cash prize award was established in 1979 by Louisville, Kentucky native Ted Heideman.

== Past winners ==
- 2013 Halfway by Emily Schwend
- 2012 The Ballad of 423 and 424 by Nicholas C. Pappas
- 2011 Compatible by Ana Li, Waterbabies by Adam LeFevre
- 2010 The Famished by Max Posner,
  - The Last Hat, a Tragedy by Kyle John Schmidt
  - Lobster Boy by Dan Dietz
- 2008 In Paris You Will Find Many Baguettes but Only One True Love by Michael Lew
- 2007 I am not Batman by Marco Ramirez
- 2006 Three Guys and a Brenda by Adam Bock
- 2004 Johannes, Pyotr & Marge by Jeffrey Essmann, Picnic (pic-nic): vi by Brendan Healy
- 2003 Fit for Feet by Jordan Harrison, Trash Anthem by Dan Dietz
- 2001 Classyass by Caleen Sinnette Jennings, Nightswim by Julia Jordan, Bake Off by Sheri Wilner
- 2000 The Office by Kate Hoffower, Creep by James Christy,
- 1999 Night Visits by Simon Fill
- 1998 The Blue Room by Courtney Baron, Dancing With A Devil by Brooke Berman, Forty Minute Finish by Jerome Hairston, Mpls., St. Paul by Julia Jordan, Drive Angry by Matt Pelfrey, Labor Day by Sheri Wilner, Just Be Frank by Caroline Williams
- 1997 "Acorn" by David Graziano
- 1996 The Unintended Video by Dale Griffiths
- 1995 "Helen at Risk" by Ellen Peterson
- 1990 Tone Clusters by Joyce Carol Oates
