= Spinning into Butter =

2019 play by Bess Wohl

- 2000 Off-Broadway production poster
- Original language: English
- Written by: Rebecca Gilman
- Characters: Sarah Daniels; Mr. Meyers; Ross Collins; Greg Sullivan; Patrick Chibas; Dean Burton Strauss; Dean Catherine Kenney
- Genre: Comedy

Premiere
- Date: June 29, 2000
- Place: Lincoln Center Theatre

Spinning into Butter is a play by the American playwright Rebecca Gilman. It premiered at the Goodman Theatre in Chicago in 1999 and later produced at the Lincoln Center and the Royal Court Theatre Upstairs. It was named one of the best plays of 1999 by Time and eventually became the third-most-produced play of the 2000-01 season in the United States.

== Plot synopsis ==
The play is set at fictional Belmont College, a mostly white liberal arts school in Vermont. Dean of Students Sarah Daniels convinces sophomore Patrick Chibas to mark his ethnicity as Puerto Rican to qualify for a minority scholarship, though he identifies as Nuyorican. Freshman Simon Brick, one of the few Black students, begins receiving racist notes, prompting the administration—Professor Ross Collins, Dean Burton Strauss, and Dean Catherine Kenney—to scramble. Sarah meets Simon privately to avoid embarrassing him.

Inspired by a race forum, senior Greg Sullivan proposes a student group, Students for Tolerance, with Strauss as sponsor. Patrick critiques the forum and the administration’s tokenism, ultimately boycotting it and planning to transfer. The president demands a plan to address racism, leading Sarah to reveal her own latent biases and discriminatory thoughts in conversations with Ross.

It is later revealed that Simon wrote the racist notes himself, struggling with self-hatred. The administration discusses Simon’s behavior, and he is expelled. Sarah resigns after being confronted about her own discriminatory remarks. Greg reports that Students for Tolerance successfully engages students, including the Black Student Union, in honest conversations about racism.

== Origin ==
Rebecca Gilman was a student for a short time in 1983 at Middlebury College in Middlebury, Vermont, before transferring to Birmingham-Southern. The origin of Spinning into Butter is an incident like the one in the play that happened at Middlebury in fall 1983. An African-American freshman named John Grace living in the freshman dormitory Allen reported that he had found racist notes on his door marker board and a rock thrown through his window. There were few black students at Middlebury and they were a fairly insular group, but almost nobody on campus felt Middlebury was a racist institution. The student body, the faculty and the administration were horrified. Students rallied around Grace and guarded his dorm room 24 hours a day. Even with the guard, Grace found another racist note in his room. On September 30, 1983, an investigation discovered that Grace had written the note. He admitted it and promptly left campus. Middlebury College President Olin Robison held an All-College meeting that was very well attended immediately after Grace left campus informing the college of these events.

== Controversy ==
The play's treatment of racism has sparked some controversy. Several productions include a forum at the end for audience members to discuss the issues raised. The novelist Ishmael Reed criticized the play, calling it racist and clumsy.

The play's treatment of political and social issues in an academic context has prompted comparisons with David Mamet's play Oleanna (1992).

== Productions ==
The world premiere was presented by the Goodman Theatre in Chicago on May 16, 1999.

- Artistic director: Robert Falls
- Executive director: Roche Schulfer
- Director: Les Waters
- Assistant director: Jerry Curran
- Set design: Linda Buchanan
- Costumes: Birgit Rattenborg Wise
- Lighting: Robert Christen
- Sound design and music: Rob Milburn and Larry Schanker
- Cast: Mary Beth Fisher (Sarah), Andrew Navarro (Patrick), Jim Leaming (Ross), Robert Breuler (Dean Strauss), Mary Ann Thebus (Dean Kenney), Matt DeCaro (Mr. Meyers) and Bruch Reed (Greg).

The play opened Off-Broadway at the Lincoln Center Mitzi E. Newhouse Theater on July 26, 2000, in association with Lincoln Center Festival 2000, and closed on September 16, 2000.

- Director: Daniel Sullivan
- Set design: John Lee Beatty
- Costumes: Jess Goldstein
- Lighting: Brian MacDevitt
- Original music and sound: Dan Moses Schreier
- Cast: Hope Davis (Sarah), Jai Rodriguez (Patrick), Daniel Jenkins (Ross), Henry Strozier (Dean Strauss), Brenda Wehle (Dean Kenney), Matt DeCaro (Mr. Meyers) and Steven Pasquale (Greg).

The British premiere of the play was at the Royal Court Theatre Upstairs in January 2001, directed by Dominic Cooke.

== Film adaptation ==
A film version of the play was released in 2007. It was directed by Mark Brokaw and stars Sarah Jessica Parker, Miranda Richardson and Beau Bridges. Parts of the film were shot in and around New York City on Governors Island, at Brooklyn College and Drew University in Madison, New Jersey.
