= Richard Dresser =

American playwright and screenwriter

Richard Dresser (born 1951) is an American playwright, screenwriter, novelist, and teacher whose work has been performed in New York, leading regional theaters, and all over Europe. His first dystopian fiction novel, It Happened Here, was released in October 2020. The novel is an oral history of an American family from the years 2019 to 2035, dealing with life in a totalitarian state when you still have Netflix and two-day free shipping and all you've lost is your freedom. He is co-producing a documentary about Daniel and Phillip Berrigan, antiwar priests and lifelong activists.

== Personal life and early career ==
Dresser was raised in central Massachusetts, where he was captain of the high school hockey team and catcher on the varsity baseball team. He graduated from Brown University in 1973. In his early twenties he worked a variety of jobs ranging from machine operator in a plastics factory to security guard to local radio news reporter in Pittsfield, Massachusetts. This motivated him to get a graduate degree in communications at the University of North Carolina at Chapel Hill, where he was Program Director at the local NPR station. He took a life-changing course in dramatic writing which led him to write his first play. The play won a college playwriting competition and started him on his way as a playwright.

Before finding success as a playwright, he did freelance writing for corporate speeches and wrote industrial films, many for pharmaceutical companies. He credits his early career experiences in factories and the corporate world with inspiring his workplace comedies, The Downside and Below the Belt (set in a pharmaceutical company and a manufacturing plant, respectively).

Dresser lived in New York until 1992, when he moved to Los Angeles with his wife, Rebecca, and son, Sam, to work in television. He and his family moved to Hastings-on-Hudson, New York, in 2000.

== Playwriting ==
Since his early career, Dresser has been unusually prolific. His seventeen published plays, three musicals, and various shorter plays have been performed all over the country. Venues that have hosted regional, national, or world premieres of his work include the Humana Festival at Actors Theater of Louisville, the Contemporary American Theatre Festival (CATF) in Shepherdstown, West Virginia, the Laguna Playhouse in Laguna Beach, California, and the Merrimack Repertory Theater in Lowell, Massachusetts. He has developed plays at the Eugene O'Neill Playwrights Conference in Connecticut, the Denver Center's New Play Summit, and the PlayPenn New Play Conference in Philadelphia.

Among his notable early works were Better Days (which premiered in April 1987 at the Philadelphia Festival Theatre for New Plays) and The Downside (which premiered in November 1987 at the Long Wharf Theater in New Haven, Connecticut). In 1995, Dresser's Below the Belt premiered at the Humana Festival, followed by a 1996 Off-Broadway production. The Wall Street Journal named the play the "best new American play of the season." Since its debut, Below the Belt has found especially high popularity all over Europe, including over 50 productions in Germany alone. Below the Belt, along with a number of his other plays, have been produced at the Schaubuhne Theatre in Berlin under the direction of Thomas Ostermeier. The play was later filmed as Human Error, directed by Robert M. Young. It appeared at the Sundance Film Festival.

His most successful play in the United States is Rounding Third, a 2002 two-character comedy about two Little League coaches, which was workshopped at CATF in 2001 before its 2002 premiere in Chicago. In 2003, the play was performed at San Diego's Old Globe Theater and the Laguna Playhouse before an off-Broadway run and a return to CATF in 2004. It was later made into the film Benched.

Kevin Kelly of the Boston Globe called Dresser "a ferocious playwright...who writes with a headlong intensity and a sense of pervasive mystery."

The LA Times said, "Dresser's dialogue crackles like gunfire in a shooting gallery."

John Simon in New York Magazine said, "Below the Belt is a terribly serious play that keeps you steadily laughing; properly understood, it should also make you weep."

More recent plays include The Last Days of Mickey & Jean, about an aging gangster on the run with his longtime girlfriend. It premiered at Merrimack Repertory Theatre and later at Penguin Rep. Trouble Cometh, a comic thriller about two executives locked in an existential struggle against an impossible deadline to create a reality TV show, premiered at San Francisco Playhouse in 2015.

== Musicals ==
Dresser wrote the book for the Beach Boys Broadway musical Good Vibrations. After development at New York Stage and Film in Poughkeepsie, New York, the play opened at the Eugene O'Neill Theatre in February and closed in April after 94 performances. Dresser wrote the book for the original musical, Johnny Baseball, about the Curse of the Red Sox, with lyrics by Willie Reale and music by his brother Rob. It premiered at the American Repertory Theatre in Cambridge, Massachusetts in the spring of 2010, under the direction of Diane Paulus. It later played the Williamstown Theatre Festival. The Holler, a bluegrass ghost musical, appeared at the Williamstown Theatre Festival, with lyrics by Willie Reale and music by Rob Reale.

== Television ==
Dresser was writer/producer for the 1987-1991 comedy-drama The Days and Nights of Molly Dodd, created by Jay Tarses. Dresser went on to work on a number of other shows, including Tarses's comedy Smoldering Lust (retitled Black Tie Affair) and such cult classics as Bakersfield PD, The Job, and others which weren't so classic. He has written pilots for all the networks.

== Other activities ==
Dresser has taught screenwriting at Columbia University since 2015, following a stint teaching television writing at Rutgers.

In 2008, Dresser was one of the founders of the Writers Guild Initiative, along with Tom Fontana, Michael Weller, Lulie Haddad, Jim Hart, and John Markus. Operating under the umbrella of the Writers Guild of America, East, the Initiative's mission is to give a voice to populations not being heard, through writing workshops all over the country, including veterans, caregivers, wounded soldiers, exonerated death row prisoners, DACA recipients, LGBTQ asylum seekers, inmates at the Pendleton Prison in Indiana, victims of Hurricane Sandy, people living with HIV/AIDS, people living with chronic illness, and, more recently, nurses, paramedics and other first line responders in New York. Dresser is a frequent mentor in these workshops and is currently President of the Writers Guild Initiative.

In 2009, Dresser delivered the commencement address at Shepherd University in Shepherdstown, West Virginia, which hosts CATF every summer. Dresser told graduates that in the current state of the world, "A lot of things need fixing and there are a lot of people who need help. We need you, your talent, energy and optimism." He warned them that "there are no safe choices." Dresser also received an honorary degree from the university.

== Filmography ==
- Human Error (screenwriter)
- Benched (2018) - Screenwriter

== List of plays ==
Title	Plot/Notes	Premiere and/or Selected Other Performances
At Home	One-act.	Premiered April 1984 at Ensemble Studio Theater in New York City, as part of the theater's seventh annual marathon of new one-act plays.
The Hit Parade	A decade after the death of a talent agent's only successful client, the agent hires a car thief to impersonate the dead rock star in a comeback concert for the residents of the musician's hometown.	Performed in summer 1985 by Manhattan Punch Line at TOMI Theater in New York City.
Bait and Switch	One-act. Two brothers attempt to save their struggling restaurant by bringing in a new partner, a member of the Mafia.	Performed April 1986 as the opening play in the third annual New Dramatists Lunchtime One-Act Play Festival in . West Coast premiere in fall 1993 by Interact Theatre Company at Theater Exchange in North Hollywood.
Amnesia	A man suffers from amnesia and other difficulties. Originally written to be filmed.	First reading July 1987 at the National Playwrights Conference at Eugene O'Neill Theater Center in Waterford.
The Downside	Employees of a New Jersey pharmaceutical company prepare an anti-stress drug for its American release and cope with its unexpected side effects.	Premiered November 1987 at Long Wharf Theater in New Haven. West Coast premiere in December 1989 at Pasadena Playhouse. Performed December 1990 at Griffin Theatre in Chicago.
Alone at the Beach	Six single strangers share a summer house in the Hamptons.	Performed in spring 1988 at Humana Festival in Louisville, Kentucky. Performed in summer 1989 by the Phoenix Theatre Company at the Masters School in Westchester. Performed in summer 1991 at Way Off Broadway Playhouse in Santa Ana. Performed May 1992 at Griffin Theatre Company in Chicago. Performed June 1993 as part of Bay Street Theater Festival in Sag Harbor.
Splitsville	One-act. A young Florida couple seek jobs in a sinister new theme park being built across the street from their home.	Performed May 1988 by Primary Stages Company at 45th Street Theater in New York City. West Coast premiere in fall 1993, along with Bed and Breakfast and Bait and Switch (under the title Splitsville) by Interact Theater Company at Theater Exchange.
Better Days	A depressed former factory town in New England is revitalized by a booming industry in arson.	Performed in 1986 by Levin Gheater Company at Douglass College in New Brunswick. Performed summer 1989 by Gloucester Stage Company in Massachusetts. Performed May 1990 by Renegade Theater Company at United Synagogue of Hoboken. Performed July 1990 by Dramatist Workshop in Chicago. Performed January 1991 at Primary Stages in New York City. Performed in winter 1992–1993 at Way Off Broadway Playhouse in Santa Ana.
Bed and Breakfast	One-act. Two American couples vacation near England's Stonehenge.	Performed May 1993 as part of Ensemble Theater's Marathon of one-act plays. West Coast premiere in fall 1993 by Interact Theater Company at Theater Exchange (see Splitsville).
The Road to Ruin	One-act. Two mechanics work on the broken automobile of a married couple.	Performed July 1993 by Renegade Theater Company in New York as part of "An Evening of One-Act Comedies".
Below the Belt	Three managers stationed in a bleak, rural manufacturing plant toil and conspire against each other.	Premiered April 1995 at Humana Festival. Performed in spring 1996 at John Houseman Theatre (off-Broadway) in New York (called "Best New Play of 1996" by the Wall Street Journal). Southern California premiere May 1997 at Old Globe Theatre in San Diego. Performed summer 1997 at Contemporary American Theater Festival (CATF) in West Virginia. Over 40 productions in Germany.
Gun-Shy	A divorced couple and their new partners are stranded together in a snowbound house.	Premiered April 1997 at Humana Festival. Performed February 1998 at Playwrights Horizons. Performed summer 1998 at CATF. Southern California premiere in spring 2000 at Laguna Playhouse.
What Are You Afraid Of?	One-act (15 minutes long), written by the request of the Humana Festival's producing director Jon Jory, who asked Dresser to write a play performed in the front seat of an actual car while audience members sit in the back seat. A shy driver struggles with his attraction to an attractive female hitchhiker.	Premiered spring 1999 at Humana Festival in parked vehicle. Performed in Hamburg, Germany, where actors drove on city streets with the audience.
Something in the Air	A down-and-out man seeks to profit from the life insurance policy of a bitter, terminally ill patient.	Premiered summer 1999 directed by Melia Bensussen at Bay Street Theater in Sag Harbor. Performed summer 2000 at CATF.
Wonderful World	A mother attempts to connect with her two grown sons, both of whom are struggling with their own long-time relationships.	Premiered spring 2001 at Humana Festival. West Coast premiere summer 2001 at Laguna Playhouse.
Rounding Third	Two Little League coaches try to reconcile their very different approaches to baseball and to life. Dresser was prompted to write the play when he learned that his son's Little League coach was planning to cheat to win a game. In the original Chicago production, which starred George Wendt, the play's opening scene was moved from a bar to a ballfield to avoid audience identification with Wendt's Cheers character.	Workshopped summer 2001 at CATF. Premiered fall 2002 at Northlight Theatre outside Chicago. West Coast premiere January 2003 at Laguna Playhouse. Performed summer 2003 at Old Globe Theater in San Diego. Performed October 2003 at John Houseman Theater in New York (off-Broadway). Performed summer 2004 at CATF.
Greetings From The Home Office	One-act (seven minutes long), performed with no live actors, only recorded voices emitted from a speaker phone. A solo audience member enters an office setting and finds that they are playing the role of a newly hired employee. The audience member interacts with the computer while the voices of a boss and co-workers come from the intercom, involving the audience member in a storyline of purported scandal and corruption. Eventually the audience member "must make a pivotal decision about whom to trust," based on the voices and their interactions with the computer. The play was written for a specifically detailed commission by the Technology Plays project, a joint effort by the State University of New York (SUNY) and the Capital Repertory Theatre. (Dresser said later that he had accepted the commission, with its strenuous demands for a play to be told without live actors to one audience member at a time, only because he believed "nothing would ever come of it", and was forced to follow through when the project received a grant.)	Premiered November 2003 with five other short plays (one commissioned from William Kennedy; four others the result of a university-sponsored script competition) in the New Atrium Library at SUNY. Appeared May 2004 at the Capital Repertory Theatre in Albany.
Augusta	The first play in Dresser's "Happiness Trilogy" about class in America. Two female housecleaners scheme with their shady manager to achieve a better life for themselves.	Premiered summer 2006 at CATF. New England premiere in fall 2006 at Merrimack Repertory Theatre in Lowell.
The Pursuit of Happiness	The second play in the Happiness Trilogy. Unhappily married middle-class parents attempt to help their daughter win acceptance to college. Written on commission from the Laguna Playhouse.	Premiered January 2007 at Laguna Playhouse. Performed summer 2007 at CATF. Performed at Merrimack Repertory Theatre.
A View of the Harbor	The third play in the Happiness Trilogy. A young man brings his wealthy girlfriend to meet his eccentric family at the rural home where he grew up, and buried secrets come to light.	Premiered summer 2008 at CATF. New England premiere January 2009 at Merrimack Repertory Theatre.
The Last Days of Mickey and Jean	A gangster on the run with his girl friend faces the same problems of communication and retirement as the rest of the world. Written on commission from the Merrimack Repertory Theatre.	Premiered March 18, 2010 at Merrimack Repertory Theatre.
Johnny Baseball	The story of the Boston Red Sox mythical Curse of the Bambino (no World Series win since 1918): what really happened and how it was lifted in 2004. Dresser wrote the book for the musical.	Premiered June 2, 2010 at the Loeb Drama Center of the American Repertory Theater after previews starting May 14.
Trouble Cometh	Two executives throw around different ideas for a reality TV show, leading to the blurring between fact and fiction.	Premiered May 16, 2015 at the San Francisco Playhouse after previews starting May 12.

== Bibliography ==
- It Happened Here, Dallas: Brown Books Publishing, 2020 ISBN 978-1-61254-495-3
