= Fred Roos =

American film producer (1934–2024)

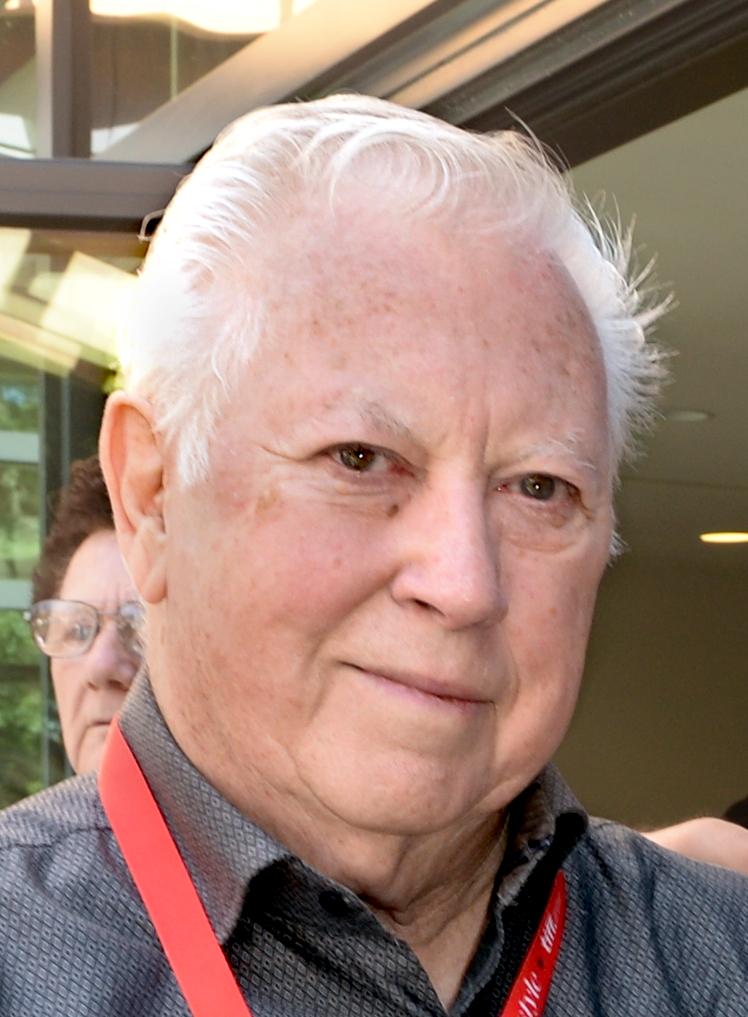
- Roos in 2014
- Born: Frederick Ried Roos; May 22, 1934; Santa Monica, California, U.S.
- Died: May 18, 2024 (aged 89); Beverly Hills, California, U.S.
- Occupations: Film producer, casting director
- Years active: 1964–2024

Frederick Ried Roos (May 22, 1934 – May 18, 2024) was an American film producer and casting director. He was best known for his contributions to the New Hollywood movement, particularly through his collaborations with director Francis Ford Coppola. He won the Academy Award for Best Picture for The Godfather: Part II (1974), with further nominations for The Conversation (1974) and Apocalypse Now (1979).

== Early life ==
Frederick Ried Roos was born on May 22, 1934, in Santa Monica, California, the son of Florence Mary (née Stout) and Victor Otto Roos. He attended Hollywood High School and subsequently attended University of California, Los Angeles, majoring in theatre arts and motion pictures.

He served two tours in the United States Army, stationed in South Korea, where he befriended future producer/director Garry Marshall.

== Career ==
Following his exit from the military, Roos started his career in the entertainment industry with talent agency MCA Inc., where he performed a series of odd jobs, including serving as driver to Marilyn Monroe, before being promoted to junior agent He began his career as a casting director for television, working on The Andy Griffith Show, That Girl, Gomer Pyle, U.S.M.C., and I Spy. In 1964, he produced and cast his first film, Fight to Fury, featuring a young Jack Nicholson in one of his first roles.

Building a career as a casting director throughout the 1960s into the early 1970s, Roos gained a reputation as "the best eye for talent in the business", being responsible for the casting of Al Pacino in The Godfather, Harrison Ford and Richard Dreyfuss in American Graffiti, Ford and Carrie Fisher in Star Wars, and Tom Cruise, Matt Dillon, Rob Lowe and Patrick Swayze in The Outsiders, among many others.

Further credits as casting director included Five Easy Pieces, Fat City, Petulia, and Zabriskie Point.

Roos' professional relationship with Francis Ford Coppola began with The Godfather, for which Roos served as casting director. Roos became Coppola's producing partner on his subsequent film, The Conversation, and continued to produce Coppola's films throughout the remainder of his career, including The Godfather Part II, Apocalypse Now, The Outsiders, Rumble Fish, The Cotton Club, and The Godfather Part III.

Roos' other producing credits included The Black Stallion, Hammett, Barfly, The Secret Garden, Radioland Murders, The Virgin Suicides, and Town & Country.

== Accolades ==
Roos won the Academy Award for Best Picture for The Godfather Part II, and was further nominated for producing The Conversation and Apocalypse Now.

In 1988, Roos received the Lifetime Achievement Award from the Casting Society of America.

In 2007, he was a member of the jury at the 29th Moscow International Film Festival.

== Personal life ==
Roos was married to Nancy Drew. They had one son, Alexander "Sandy" Roos, who later became Roos' producing partner.

Roos died in Beverly Hills, California, on May 18, 2024, four days before his 90th birthday. His final film, Megalopolis, held its world premiere two days prior at the 2024 Cannes Film Festival.

== Filmography ==
=== As producer (including co-producer and executive producer) ===
Year	Title	Awards
1974	The Conversation	Academy Award for Best Picture (nominated)
1974	The Godfather Part II	Academy Award for Best Picture
1979	Apocalypse Now	Academy Award for Best Picture (nominated)
1979	The Black Stallion	
1982	One from the Heart	
1983	The Outsiders	
1983	Rumble Fish	
1984	The Cotton Club	
1987	Barfly	
1990	The Godfather Part III	Academy Award for Best Picture (nominated)
1994	Radioland Murders	
1999	The Virgin Suicides	
2003	Lost in Translation	Academy Award for Best Picture (nominated)
2006	Marie Antoinette	
2012	The Story of Luke	
2014	St. Vincent	
2018	Benched	
2019	I'll Find You	
2022	5-25-77	
2023	Wonderwell	
2024	Megalopolis	

=== As casting director ===
Year	Title
1970	Five Easy Pieces
1971	Two-Lane Blacktop
1972	The Godfather
1972	The King of Marvin Gardens
1973	American Graffiti
2024	Megalopolis
