= Nora at the Altar-Rail =

2008 chamber opera by Jay Anthony Gach and Royce Vavrek

Nora at the Altar-Rail is a one-act opera by Jay Anthony Gach, to a libretto by Royce Vavrek; the music is performed on a piano. The libretto is based on the Book of Genesis and inspired by Thomas Hardy's poem "At the Altar-Rail" which is prominently featured in the piece.

Written while Vavrek and Gach were in residence at the American Lyric Theater, the opera was performed in concert in the Leonard Nimoy Thalia Theatre in the Symphony Space in Manhattan, New York, on January 7, 2008. It was performed again at Opera America's National Opera Center in February 2014. In 2020, Michelle Di Russo conducted the opera at the J. Russell and Bonita Nelson Fine Arts Center of Arizona State University.

== Roles and premiere cast ==
- Nora (soprano), Colleen McGrath
- Anders (tenor), Edwin Vega
- Lars (baritone), Christopher Burchett

== Scenes ==
- Prologue, North Dakota — Nora
- Scene 1, The kitchen in the farmhouse — Lars, Nora
- Scene 2, The bookstore in town — Anders, Nora
- Scene 3, The living room in the farm house Lars, Nora

Duration: 20 minutes.
