= American Lyric Theater =

Opera company based in New York City

American Lyric Theater (ALT) is an opera company based in New York City who specializes in the development of new works. It was founded by Lawrence Edelson in 2005.

== Programs ==
American Lyric Theater's Composer Librettist Development Program (CLDP) is the only full-time mentorship initiative for emerging operatic writers in the United States. Operas written by alumni of this program have gone on to be produced by more than 70 opera companies, festivals, and universities worldwide. Notable composer alumni include Clarice Assad, Jasmine Arielle Barnes, Christopher Cerrone, Aleksandra Vrebalov, Derrick Wang, and Alex Weiser. Notable librettist alumni include Deborah Brevoort, E. M. Lewis, and Royce Vavrek.

== Commissions ==
ALT also commissions new operas with the goal of developing a new body of repertoire and attracting new audiences to opera.

American Lyric Theater commissioned The Golden Ticket in 2006, a new opera based on Roald Dahl's book, Charlie and the Chocolate Factory, by American composer Peter Ash and British librettist Donald Sturrock. The Golden Ticket was commissioned by ALT in partnership with Felicity Dahl, and received its world premiere at Opera Theatre of Saint Louis on June 13, 2010.

In 2008, the chamber opera Nora at the Altar-Rail by Jay Anthony Gach and Royce Vavrek was developed at the ALT ander the CLDP.

The company commissioned The Poe Project, a trilogy of one act operas inspired by the fiction of Edgar Allan Poe: Buried Alive by composer Jeff Myers and librettist Quincy Long; ...of the Flesh by composer Jay Anthony Gach and librettist Royce Vavrek; and Embedded by composer Patrick Soluri and librettist Deborah Brevoort. The Poe Project received a workshop reading at New York's Symphony Space in November 2010 and is being further developed by ALT for future staged production.

== Faculty and artistic mentorship team ==
American Lyric Theater's faculty and artistic mentorship team includes composer/librettist Mark Adamo, composer Daniel Catán, composer Anthony Davis, dramaturg Cori Ellison, librettist Michael Korie, director Rhoda Levine, and librettist William M. Hoffman.
