= Deaton-Flanigen Productions =

American film company

Deaton Flanigen Productions
- Type: Entertainment company
- Headquarters: Nashville, Tennessee
- Website: www.deatonflanigen.com/index.php

Deaton-Flanigen Productions is an American film company based in Nashville, Tennessee, U.S., headed by Robert Deaton. The company has between 10 and 50 employees.

== Overview ==
The company was named after the surnames of founders Robert Deaton III and George Flanigen IV. The two have directed multiple music videos, primarily in the field of country music. One of the duo's first music videos, Vern Gosdin's "That Just About Does It", won them an award at the 32nd Annual International Film and TV Festival. Martina McBride's "A Broken Wing", directed by Deaton-Flanigen, was nominated for Best Music Video at the Country Music Association in 1998.

Deaton-Flanigen directed the film Benched (2018).
