= Jasmine Arielle Barnes =

American artist and educator

- Born: September 28, 1991 (age 34); Baltimore, Maryland, U.S.
- Genres: Classical; Opera; Choral
- Occupations: Composer; Vocalist; Educator
- Labels: Navona Records; Warner; ACIS; Cedille; Lexicon Records
- Member of: Alpha Kappa Alpha; Sigma Alpha Iota
- Website: www.jasminebarnescomposer.com

Jasmine Arielle Barnes (born September 28, 1991) is an American composer and vocalist. Barnes' compositions often incorporate narratives focused on African American experiences and civil rights history.

== Early life and education ==
Barnes was born on September 28, 1991, in Baltimore, Maryland. Barnes initially studied architecture at Morgan State University before changing her major to Music. She earned a Bachelor of Arts degree in Music with a concentration in Vocal Performance from Morgan State University in 2015.

== Career ==
Barnes has held academic positions in music education. She served as Head of Composition and Jazz Voice at Booker T. Washington High School for the Performing and Visual Arts in Dallas, Texas. Barnes studied composition at Morgan State University under the guidance of Dr. James Lee III. James Lee III is an American composer whose works have been performed by orchestras and ensembles.

According to the Chicago Symphony Orchestra, she was the first composition major in the university's history and organized the inaugural composition recital at the institution.

=== Compositions and major works ===
Barnes has composed works across multiple genres. Her opera "She Who Dared," with librettist Deborah D.E.E.P. Mouton, premiered at the Chicago Opera Theater in 2025. The work focuses on Black women involved in bus desegregation efforts in the American South during the 1950s.

Other compositions include the choral/orchestral song cycle "Portraits: Douglass and Tubman," commissioned by Baltimore Choral Arts Society and the orchestral piece "KINSFOLKNEM," which premiered at Carnegie Hall in 2024 with the National Youth Orchestra 2.

=== Residencies and collaborations ===
Barnes has held composer residencies, including a fellowship at Chautauqua Opera during the 2021 season and a residency with All Classical Portland. She was part of the Opera Theater of Saint Louis New Works Collective from 2023-2024 and the American Lyric Theater Composer Librettist Development Program from 2021-2023. She participated in the All Classical Portland Recording Inclusivity Initiative in 2021.

=== Awards and honors ===
Barnes received a 2023 Capital Emmy Award for the PBS documentary "Dreamer," which featured her work "Portraits: Douglass and Tubman." She has received grants from Opera America, including the Discovery Opera Grant for Women Composers and the Opera Grants for Women Composers in 2024 for her opera "She Who Dared."

Barnes has received recognition, including the International Florence Price Award (2021), the Gwendolyn Brinkley Fine Arts Award 2021, the All Classical Portland Recording Inclusivity Initiative Winner (2021), American Composers Forum NextNotes High School Music Creator Educator Recognition (2020), and the Black Brilliance Award Winner.

=== Media appearances and recognition ===
Barnes has been featured in media outlets, including CNN's First of All with Victor Blackwell and PBS programs Chicago Tonight Black Voices and Artworks. The Chicago Symphony Orchestra has profiled her.

Her compositions have been reviewed by publications including The Chicago Tribune, The Washington Post, and The Boston Globe.

=== Compositions ===
Barnes has composed several operas. She Who Dared (2025), with libretto by Deborah D.E.E.P. Mouton, was commissioned by the American Lyric Theater and premiered at the Chicago Opera Theater in June 2025.

Other operatic works include On My Mind (2024), commissioned by Opera Theatre of Saint Louis with libretto by Deborah D.E.E.P. Mouton; I Will Follow You Into the Dark (2022), commissioned by American Lyric Theater with libretto by Marcus Yi; and The Burning Bush (2021), commissioned by Washington National Opera for the Kennedy Center's 50th anniversary celebration with libretto by Joshua Banbury. Barnes has also composed shorter operatic works, including The Late Walk (2020) and Star Arts High

Barnes has composed works for orchestra, including KINSFOLKNEM Concertante (2024), which was commissioned and premiered by Carnegie Hall with the NYO2 orchestra.

=== Choral and orchestral works ===
"Portraits: Douglass and Tubman" (2022) for choir and orchestra was commissioned by the Baltimore Choral Arts Society, featuring texts by Frederick Douglass and Harriet Tubman. "Songs for the People" is an oratorio composed in 2024 by Jasmine Barnes for soloists, chorus, and chamber orchestra. The work uses text by Frances Ellen Watkins Harper, a 19th-century American poet, abolitionist, and activist.

=== Choral works ===
Barnes has composed several choral works that address themes of social justice and the African American experience.

"Sometimes I Cry" (2019) for a cappella choir uses text by Tupac Shakur and was commissioned by Tennessee State University Meistersingers and premiered in June 2019.

== Discography ==
Barnes's compositions have been featured on several commercial recordings:

- Amplify (2022) – All Classical Portland's Recording Inclusivity Initiative Vol. 1, released by Navona Records, featuring "Taking Names" performed by Karen Slack and Yoko Greeney.
- Rising (2023) – Released by Warner Classics, performed by Lawrence Brownlee and Kevin Miller, featuring "Peace" and "Invocation".
- Dreamer (2023) – Released by ACIS, performed by Baltimore Choral Arts Society under Anthony Blake Clark, featuring "Portraits: Douglass and Tubman".
- A Miracle in Legacy (2024) – Released by Lexicon Records, performed by Joshua Conyers and Chelsea Whittaker, featuring Barnes' song cycle of the same name.
