= Sheri Wilner =

American playwright (born 1969)

Sheri Wilner (born January 22, 1969) is an American playwright.

Her works have been produced at the Humana Festival of New American Plays, the Guthrie Theater, Actors Theatre of Louisville, Primary Stages Einhorn School of Performing Arts (ESPA), Williamstown Theatre Festival, Naked Angels, Rattlestick Playwrights Theater, Cherry Lane Theatre Alternative, Ensemble Studio Theatre, Women's Project Theater, and the Philadelphia Theatre Company. In addition her plays have been produced at the Contemporary American Theater Festival in Shepherdstown, West Virginia, the Summer Play Festival in New York, and the Old Vic New Voices program in London.

== Career ==
Sheri Wilner attended Cornell University, graduating Phi Beta Kappa with a Bachelor of Arts in English in 1991. She went to Columbia University School of the Arts where she studied with Romulus Linney, Eduardo Machado, Tina Howe, and Andrei Șerban. She received her Master of Fine Arts in Playwriting from Columbia in 1999.

Also an established playwriting teacher, she teaches at New York University's Dramatic Writing Program, the Dramatists Guild Institute Link label, and PlayPenn [https://www.playpenn.org/classes/. She was the 2016-2017 Rev. J. Donald Monan, S.J. Professor in Theatre Arts at Boston College, the 2013-14 Fred Coe Playwright-in-Residence at Vanderbilt University, and a visiting assistant professor in Playwriting at Florida State University’s MFA Dramatic Writing Program. She has also taught at the University of California, Cornell University, the University of Minnesota. and for the Off-Broadway theatre companies Primary Stages, and New Georges.

A review of the Humana Festival premiere of Wilner's one-act play Bake-Off in the New York Times said “the play completely earns its farcical climax. 'Bake Off' is barbed, witty, thoughtful, giggle and snort inducing and most of all compact; it accomplishes everything in 20 minutes tops." Chicago Tribune journalist Michael Kilian in a 2005 review of Winer's play Father Joy said the play was “a joy to behold”.

Wilner's latest play Kingdom City uses a high school production of Arthur Miller's play The Crucible to explore religion, community values, and censorship. It had its world premiere at the La Jolla Playhouse on September 12, 2014. A review in the San Diego Union Tribune said, "Wilner explores the issues at hand with considerable wit and insight, and weaves in themes and even passages from The Crucible ... in some wonderful and surprising ways."

Wilner co-adapted her play Bake Off into the musical Cake Off with playwright Julia Jordan and composer Adam Gwon. It premiered at Signature Theatre in 2015 and received a Helen Hayes Award nomination for Outstanding Original Play or Musical Adaptation. It was subsequently produced by Bucks County Playhouse and starred Euan Morton and Justin Guarini

== Awards ==
Wilner is a two-time winner of the Heideman Award granted by Actors Theatre of Louisville, for her plays Labor Day in 1998 and Bake Off in 2001, both of which premiered at the Humana Festival.

Other playwriting awards include a Howard Foundation Fellowship (2008–2009), a Dramatists Guild Playwriting Fellowship (2000–2001), a Bush Artist Fellowship (2007–2010), and two Playwrights’ Center Jerome Fellowships (2006–2007).

The Rose O’Neill Literary House, Washington College’s center for literature and the literary arts, will establish the Douglass Wallop Fellowship as a nationwide competition and award the initial 2015 fellowship to Wilner.

== Works ==
Partial list of productions of Wilner's plays:

=== Full-length plays ===
- 2014 Kingdom City La Jolla Playhouse
- 2008 The End Guthrie Theater, Minneapolis, MN
- 2005 Father Joy Summer Play Festival, New York, NY
- 2000 Hunger Contemporary American Theater Festival, Shepherdstown, WV

=== One-acts ===
- 2012 The Miracle of Chanukah “Playing on Air” broadcast on Public Radio
- 2012 Arts & Sciences Boston Theater Marathon
- 2011 A Tall Order Boston Theater Marathon
- 2007 The First Night of Chanukah Illusion Theater, Minneapolis, MN
- 2006 Equilibrium The Guthrie Theater
- 2004 Hell and Back New Georges’ Manfest, New York, NY
- 2004 The Bushesteia The Hourglass Group, New York, NY
- 2003 Moving Shortly Naked Angels, New York, NY
- 2002 Bake Off Actors Theatre of Louisville, Humana Festival of New American Plays
- 2002 The Unknown Part of the Ocean Women on Top Festival, Boston, MA
- 2001 Little Death of a Salesman Women on Top Festival, Boston, MA
- 1999 Joan of Arkansas Actors Theatre of Louisville, Louisville, KY
- 1999 Labor Day Actors Theatre of Louisville, Humana Festival of New American Plays
- 1996 Relative Strangers New Georges, New York, NY

=== Screenplays ===
- 2007 Sugar Fix
