= Bob Knuth =

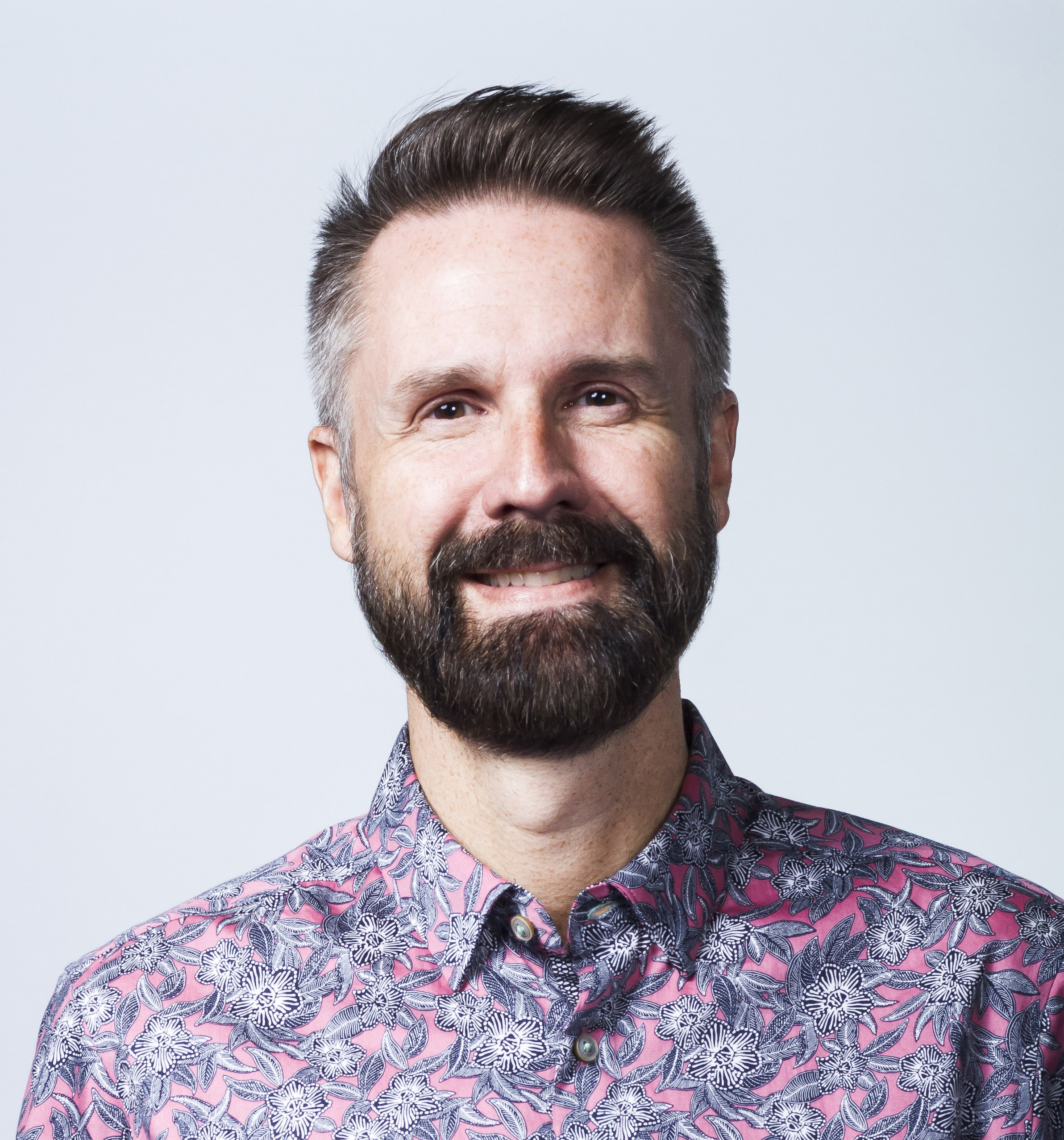
Bob Knuth

Robert Alan Knuth (born May 15, 1967) is an American scenic designer and creative director based in the Chicago, Illinois area. Knuth has been nominated for 15 Joseph Jefferson Awards and is a two-time award winner for outstanding scenic design.

Knuth was the Creative Director of Marketing & Brand for The Second City Inc (Chicago, Hollywood, Toronto) and UP Comedy Club in Chicago from 2005 to 2021. During the pandemic, Knuth pivoted his career to focus on design and education. In August of 2021, Knuth took a position as the Resident Set & Light Designer/Theater Technical Director for Lake Forest College in Lake Forest, Illinois just north of Chicago.

== Biography ==
After attending undergraduate school at the University of Wisconsin - Eau Claire (1985-1990) and completing two years of graduate studies in Design for the Theatre at Northwestern University (1990-1992), Knuth began his career as the Managing Artistic Director for CenterLight Sign and Voice Theatre in Northbrook, Illinois, in 1993.

Knuth was the Senior Graphic Designer at The Chicago Symphony Orchestra from 1998-2005.

Besides working as a freelance scenic and graphic designer, Knuth was Producing Director and resident Scenic/Graphic Designer for Circle Theatre Chicago in Forest Park from 2001-2013 before stepping down to pursue freelance work and focus on his career at The Second City.

In 2004, Chris Jones, Chief Theater Critic for The Chicago Tribune wrote about Knuth's body of work in Chicago storefront theaters, "Perhaps more than any other set designer working in the Chicago area, Knuth has solved the aesthetic problems inherent in the prosaic, end-on storefront where audience members sit in narrow rows and stare over the backs of heads at a rectangular stage without much depth or height."

During his tenure as Producing Director, Circle Theatre hosted visits from several entertainment figures, including Rupert Holmes, Michael John LaChiusa, Marvin Hamlisch, and Russell Crowe. The theatre also presented world and Chicago premieres and developed a subscriber base.

Other scenic design credits include The Kennedy Center/The Second City productions of America; It’s Complicated!, and Generation Gap, Mercury Theatre Chicago's productions of Clue - The Play, The Addams Family (2015 JEFF Award for Outstanding Musical Production) and The Color Purple. The Second City's mainstage productions of Let Them Eat Chaos, Depraved New World Panic on Cloud 9 and for The Second City's E.T.C. 39th Revue. Fox Valley Rep's (formally Noble Fool Theatre at Pheasant Run Resort) Let's Misbehave, Breaking Up is Hard To Do, The 25th Annual Putnam County Spelling Bee, and The Mystery of Edwin Drood.

In the fall of 2022, Knuth was the lead interior designer for the reopening of the historic iO Theater comedy complex, overseeing the extensive renovations to the facade, two bars, offices, training center classrooms, and four theaters.

== Other awards ==
Knuth won the Joseph Jefferson Award for Scenic design in 2004 and 2009 and was nominated 13 more times.

In 2015 and 2017, Knuth received In-House Design Merit Awards from HOW Design Magazine for poster designs promoting the 103rd and 104th mainstage revues at The Second City.
