= American Theatre Critics Association =

Professional association of American theatre critics

The American Theatre Critics Association (ATCA) is the only nationwide professional association of theatre critics in the United States. The ATCA membership consists of theatre critics who write reviews and critiques of live theatre for print, broadcast, and digital media. The organization is best known for its annual Steinberg/ATCA New play Award recognizing work developed and premiered in regional theaters. It also makes the recommendation for the Regional Theatre Tony Award. ATCA is an affiliate organization of the International Association of Theatre Critics. The current chair of ATCA's executive committee is David John Chávez, a San Francisco-based theatre critic. The vice chair is Amanda Finn, a Chicago-based freelance theatre critic.

== History ==
ATCA was founded on August 3, 1974, at the Eugene O'Neill Theater Center in Waterford, Connecticut. The organization was created to provide a professional home for theatre critics outside of the New York City metropolitan area, who were not eligible for membership in the New York Drama Critics' Circle. Then-Critics' Circle president Henry Hewes organized the meeting, which 26 critics attended. As of July 2016 ATCA had over 225 members.

== Awards ==
ATCA administers several awards as part of its mission to strengthen American theatre nationwide. Three of these are awards for administered solely by ATCA, while two are awards for other theatre artists that are administered in conjunction with other organizations.

=== Jointly administered awards ===
==== Regional Theatre Tony Award ====
The most prominent prize that ATCA has a role in is the Regional Theatre Tony Award. Each year ATCA members confidentially vote for this Tony Award, and the organization's choice is presented to the Tony Award committee. ATCA's vote is solely advisory: the Tony Awards committee makes the decision of which company to give the award to. However, to date (2014), ATCA's recommendation has been accepted every year, even in 1987, with the then-controversial San Francisco Mime Troupe. The first theatre company to win the award was Arena Stage in 1976. From 1976 to 2013 only theatre companies outside of New York City were eligible; in 2013 the Tony Awards committee announced that non-profit theatre companies within the five boroughs of New York City would be eligible, although Broadway companies would still be ineligible for this particular Tony Award. After this change was made Signature Theatre was the first New York City company to win the award in 2014.

==== Theater Hall of Fame ====
The American Theater Hall of Fame is located in the lobby of the Gershwin Theatre in New York City (current home of the musical Wicked). ATCA members form an overwhelming percentage of the voters each year to decide new inductees, though the voting and award are administered by the Hall of Fame itself. The annual induction ceremony of (in recent years) eight new members takes place at the end of January.

=== Solely administered awards ===
==== Harold and Mimi Steinberg/ATCA New Play Award ====
The Harold and Mimi Steinberg/ATCA New Play Award is a prize awarded for a play that has had its premiere in the previous calendar year and which did not play in New York City in that same year. Currently the award total is $25,000, with two additional awards of $7,500 each for plays worthy of citation. Past winners include important works, such as All the Way (which later won the 2014 Tony Award for Best Play), 33 Variations, and The Piano Lesson. Four playwrights have won the award multiple times: Jane Martin has won the award four times (for Talking With, Keely and Du, Jack and Jill, and Anton in Show Business). August Wilson has won three times (for Fences, The Piano Lesson, and Two Trains Running). Lee Blessing, Bill Cain, Lauren Gunderson and E.M. Lewis have each won twice. Cain is the only playwright to win in consecutive years (2010 and 2011). Wilson is the playwright with the most citations (five). Blessing also has one citation.

==== Francesca Primus Prize for an Emerging Woman Playwright ====
The Francesca Primus Prize for an Emerging Woman Playwright is a $10,000 prize for female playwrights who have made contributions to American theatre but who have not yet achieved substantial nationwide recognition. ATCA started awarding the Primus Prize in 2004.

==== M. Elizabeth Osborn Award ====
The M. Elizabeth Osborn Award is a prize given to a playwright who merits recognition, but whose works have not received a major award or any Broadway or Off-Broadway productions. The award comes with $1,000 and recognition in the Best Plays yearbook.

== Online presence ==
ATCA's principal online presence is through its website. The site contains information about ATCA news, prizes, history, and members. ATCA also uses the site to further the discussion of theatre criticism in the United States by posted links to controversies and discussions relevant to members, theatre artists, and the general public.

The organization also has a Twitter account and a Facebook page. Many ATCA members maintain their own online presence, and ATCA maintains a separate Twitter account that retweets links to members' theatre reviews.

== Foundation ATCA ==
Foundation ATCA is a legally separate non-profit organization that exists to support ATCA's goals. All ATCA members also belong to the foundation, and some ATCA members serve as governing officers of both organizations. The current president of the Foundation board is Jay Handleman, longtime critic of the Sarasota Herald-Tribune.
