= Erma Duricko =

American theatre director

Erma Duricko is an American theatre director specializing in new plays and the works of Tennessee Williams. She is the artistic director of Blue Roses Productions, a New York-based production company. She is a recognized interpreter of Tennessee Williams' work having directed most of his major plays and debuting several of his unpublished works.

== Awards ==
In 2011 Durick received the Jerry Harper Service Award for her accomplishments on behalf of the Theatre Conference organization.
