= E. M. Lewis =

American playwright

- Born: Ellen M. Lewis; Silverton, Oregon, US
- Education: Silverton High School; Willamette University; University of Southern California; Princeton University
- Occupation: Playwright
- Writing career
- Language: English
- Period: 2004–
- Genres: Drama, opera
- Subjects: Climate change, war and gun control
- Notable awards: Steinberg Award; Primus Prize; Edgerton Award; Hodder Fellowship
- Website: emlewisplaywright.com

Ellen M. Lewis (professionally known as E. M. Lewis) is an American playwright, teacher, and opera librettist based in Oregon.

== Career ==
Lewis pursued degrees in literature (BA English, MFA Writing) before moving to Baltimore in 2013 to train with the American Lyric Theater’s Composer Librettist Development Program.

Her work has gone on to receive critical success. Edward Albee, in his award citation for Heads, remarked that it was "provocative and wonderfully threatening". The LA Weekly observed of the play that "the question of who we are beneath our posturing lands with such force, it jangles the nerves long after the play has ended." The New Yorker wrote: "[P]art drawing-room comedy, part locked-room mystery, Magellanica de-abstracts the larger threats surrounding the characters and their relationships, gradually immersing the audience in possibilities usually too complex—or too disturbing—to face." Her one-man The Gun Show, which went on tour across the U.S. and to the Edinburgh Fringe Festival, has been called a “compact yet high-caliber theatrical, a short one-hour blast of personal recollection, rhetoric and genuinely conflicted questioning.”

Her plays have been workshopped, developed, and produced by a range of organizations, including the Edinburgh Fringe Festival, American Lyric Theatre, The Lark, Page 73, Project Y, Ashland New Plays Festival, Arkansas New Play Festival, PlayFest Santa Barbara, EcoDrama Festival, the HotCity Greenhouse Festival, Great Plains Theater Conference, Last Frontier Theater Conference, William Inge Center for the Arts, Artists Repertory Theater, TimeLine Theater, Guthrie Theatre, Playwrights Theater of New Jersey, New Voices for the Theater Program, Theatre Latte Da, Moving Arts, Passage Theater, 16th Street Theater, and University of Maryland Opera Studio, among others.

Originally from rural Oregon, Lewis has taught at Southern Illinois University Edwardsville, Lewis & Clark College, Independence Community College, and Hostos Community College. She returned to the Pacific northwest in 2014, where she writes and frequently gives workshops through the ArtsHub at Artists Repertory Theatre. She is a member of the LineStorm Playwrights writing collective, International Center for Women Playwrights, the National Opera Center, and the Dramatists Guild.

=== Awards ===
In addition to this positive critical reception, Lewis has been a finalist for the Sundance Theater Lab, Oregon Book Award, the Shakespeare's Sisters fellowship, and Arizona Opera’s "Arizona Bold!" program, and a semi-finalist for the O'Neill Playwrights Conference.

- 2007: IN10 Competition, University of Maryland / Baltimore County
- 2007: New Works for the Stage Competition, Coe College
- 2007: Production of the Year, L.A. Weekly
- 2008: Ashland New Plays Festival
- 2008: Francesca Primus Prize, American Theater Critics Association
- 2008: Ted Schmitt Award, Los Angeles Drama Critics Circle
- 2009: EcoDrama Playwrighting Competition, University of Oregon
- 2009: Harold and Mimi Steinberg New Play Award, American Theater Critics Association
- 2010: Hodder Fellowship, Princeton University
- 2012: Drama Fellowship, New Jersey State Arts Commission
- 2016: Drama Fellowship, Oregon Book Awards
- 2018: Edgerton Award, Theater Communications Group

== Works ==
=== Full-Length Plays ===
- Apple Season
- Goodbye, Ruby Tuesday
- The Great Divide, co-commission for Artists Repertory Theatre and the Oregon Shakespeare Festival “American Revolutions” cycle
- The Gun Show
- Heads
- How the Light Gets In
- Infinite Black Suitcase
- Magellanica
- Now Comes the Night
- Reading to Vegetables
- Song of Extinction
- The Stone Languages
- True Story
- You Can See All the Stars

=== One-Acts ===
- Dorothy's Dictionary
- The Edge of Ross Island

=== Operas ===
- Town Hall, with Theo Popov
- Dear Erich, with Ted Rosenthal
- The Crossing, with Clarice Assad
- Sherlock Holmes and the Case of the Fallen Giant, with Evan Meier

=== Published works ===
- Lewis, E.M. (2010). Song of Extinction. Samuel French. ISBN 9780573697388.
- Lewis, E.M. (2011). Infinite Black Suitcase. Samuel French. ISBN 9780573699603.
- Lewis, E.M. (2019). The Gun Show. Samuel French. ISBN 9780573707384.
- Bray, John Patrick, ed. (2016). The Best Plays from American Theater Festivals 2015. Applause (published November 1, 2016). ISBN 9781495057748.
