= Profiles Theatre Chicago =

Profiles Theatre
- Formation: 1988
- Dissolved: 2016
- Type: Theatre group
- Location: Chicago
- Artistic director(s): Joe Jahraus; Darrell W. Cox
- Website: profilestheatre.org

Profiles Theatre was a small, formerly non-Equity theater company based in Chicago. The company was founded in 1988 by artistic director Joe Jahraus, and it developed a reputation for emotionally powerful and dramatically intense productions, including the multiple Jeff Award-winning Killer Joe.

In June 2016 the Chicago Reader published an article alleging an extensive pattern of workplace abuse and sexual harassment on the part of the theater company's artistic director Darrell W. Cox. Later that month, the theater announced that it was closing.

In response to concerns about harassment and abuse at some non-Equity Chicago theaters, including Profiles Theatre, the organization Not in Our House was founded by Lori Myers, Laura T. Fisher, and other theater professionals. Not in Our House developed a code of conduct called the Chicago Theatre Standards which has been adopted by a number of theater companies.
