= Rebecca Gilman =

American playwright (born 1964/65)

- Born: Rebecca Claire Gilman; 1964 or 1965 (age 61–62); Trussville, Alabama, U.S.
- Education: Middlebury College; Birmingham-Southern College (BA); University of Virginia (MA); University of Iowa (MFA)
- Occupation: Playwright
- Writing career
- Notable awards: Evening Standard Award

Rebecca Claire Gilman (born 1964 or 1965) is an American playwright. She is known for her plays, Spinning into Butter, Boy Gets Girl and Swing State, the latter two which were nominated for the Drama Desk Award for Outstanding Play. Her play, The Glory of Living was nominated for the 2002 Pulitzer Prize for Drama.

== Education ==
Gilman attended Middlebury College, graduated from Birmingham-Southern College, and earned a Master of Fine Arts from the Iowa Playwrights Workshop at the University of Iowa.

== Career ==
Gilman was the first American playwright to win an Evening Standard Award. She serves on the advisory board for Chicago Dramatists. She has received the 2008 Harper Lee Award.

Her most widely known works are Spinning Into Butter, a play that addresses political correctness and racial identity, and Boy Gets Girl, which was included in Time Magazine's List of the Best Plays and Musicals of the Decade.

A production of her adaptation of The Heart is a Lonely Hunter was the occasion of a protest by actors who felt only a deaf person should play a deaf person on stage. She currently teaches at Texas Tech University's School of Theatre and Dance as Head of Playwriting.

When asked about her influences, she remarked that "I'm a big fan of Wallace Shawn. He's incredibly smart and the only writer who writes about intellectuals in a complicated and even contradictory way. He's really funny, too. I also like Donald Margulies, Kenneth Lonergan, and Conor McPherson...Caryl Churchill, Kia Corthron, and a Chicago playwright, Jamie Pachino."

== Personal life and awards ==
Rebecca Gilman was born in 1965 in Trussville, Alabama, a suburb of Birmingham. Previously a longtime resident of Chicago, she resides in Green County, Wisconsin as of 2023.

Gilman received the Scott McPherson Award for her play The Glory of Living. This award is a commission given by the Goodman Theatre in memory of the late playwright Scott McPherson. The Glory of Living (2001) also earned her an M. Elizabeth Osborn Award, an After Dark Award, a Jeff Citation, the George Devine Award, and the Evening Standard Award for Most Promising Playwright . The Glory of Living earned her a finalist nomination for the Pulitzer Prize.

Gilman received the Roger L. Stevens Award from the Kennedy Center Fund for New American Plays as well as a Jeff Award for Spinning into Butter. According to Chris Jones, this play made her "One of America's most talked-about and sought-after playwrights."

She has also been awarded Illinois Arts Council playwriting fellowship.

Rebecca Gilman was an associate professor of playwriting and screenwriting at Northwestern University from 2006 to 2019 and is now a professor and head of playwriting at Texas Tech University. She is an artistic associate at the Goodman Theatre and also serves on the board of the Dramatists Guild of America.

== Plays ==
- Swing State (2022)
- Twilight Bowl (2019)
- Luna Gale (2014)
- Dollhouse, adapted from Henrik Ibsen's play (2010)
- The Crowd You're In With (2009)
- Lord Butterscotch and the Curse of the Darkwater Phantom (co-written with Lisa Dillman and Brett Neveu, 2007)
- The Heart Is a Lonely Hunter (2005), adapted from the novel by Carson McCullers
- The Boys are Coming Home (book by Gilman, music and lyrics by Leslie Arden, 2005)
- The Sweetest Swing in Baseball (2004)
- The American in Me (2001)
- The Glory of Living (2001)
- Blue Surge (2001)
- Spinning Into Butter (2000)
- Boy Gets Girl (2000)
- The Crime of the Century (1999)
- My Sin and Nothing More (1997)
- The Land of Little Horses (1997)

== Awards and nominations ==
| Year | Award | Category | Work | Result | Ref. |
|---|---|---|---|---|---|
| 2001 | Drama Desk Award | Outstanding Play | Boy Gets Girl | Nominated | |
| 2001 | Outer Critics Circle Award | John Gassner Award | Boy Gets Girl | Nominated | |
| 2002 | Laurence Olivier Award | Best New Play | Boy Gets Girl | Nominated | |
| 2002 | Pulitzer Prize for Drama | | The Glory of Living | Nominated | |
| 2002 | Outer Critics Circle Award | John Gassner Award | The Glory of Living | Nominated | |
