= Primary Stages =

Primary Stages was founded in 1984 by Casey Childs as an Off-Broadway not-for-profit theater company. In 2004, Primary Stages moved from its 99-seat home of 17 years at 354 West 45th Street to the 199-seat theater at 59E59 Theaters. In 2014, the company moved to The Duke on 42nd Street until 2016, when the Cherry Lane Theatre became the home for all Primary Stages productions.

== History ==
For over 30 years, Primary Stages has put on more than 130 new plays by writers such as Horton Foote, A.R. Gurney, Tanya Saracho, Romulus Linney, Dan O'Brien, Donald Margulies, Kate Hamill, Christopher Durang, Terrence McNally, Danai Gurira, Nikkole Salter, John Patrick Shanley, Mac Wellman, Sharon Washington, Lee Blessing, and David Ives.

Primary Stages 9th season included the world premiere of All in the Timing by David Ives, the most produced play in the United States during the 1995/96 season.

Primary Stages supports playwrights and develops new works through commissions, workshops, readings and two flagship programs: The Dorothy Strelsin New American Writers Group, and The Marvin and Anne Einhorn School of Performing Arts (ESPA).

== Education ==
Dorothy Strelsin New American Writers Group

Primary Stages is host to the Dorothy Strelsin New American Writers Group, which brings together six to eight emerging playwrights each season to create new plays for the American theater. These playwrights attend weekly meetings in the fall and spring, where they bring new pages to each session and receive feedback on their works in progress. At the end of the season, Primary Stages presents the first public reading of these plays in The Dorothy Strelsin Fresh Ink Readings Series.

Since its inception, over 45 full-length plays have been written in the group, many of which have been produced by prominent local and national theaters including Long Wharf Theatre, Blue Light, South Coast Repertory, The New Group, New York Stage and Film, Cherry Lane Theatre, and Primary Stages.

2018/19 members:

- Kevin Artigue
- Hilary Bettis
- Eleanor Burgess
- Chisa Hutchinson
- Elizabeth Irwin
- Jon Kern
- Matthew Minnicino
- Erica Saleh
- Jordan Seavey
- Charly Evon Simpson

Past members:

- David Lindsay Abaire
- Sofia Alvarez
- Tanya Barfield
- Courtney Baron
- Neena Beber
- Alex Beech
- Brooke Berman
- Darren Canady
- Jon Caren
- Andrew Case
- Cusi Cram
- Janis Astor del Valle
- Bruce Faulk
- Josh Fox
- Jessica Goldberg
- Daniel Goldfarb
- Rinne Groff
- Stephen Adly Guirgis
- Katori Hall
- Jerome Hairston
- Rolin Jones
- Julia Jordan
- Ryan King
- Josh Koenigsberg
- Paola Lazaro
- Josh Levine
- Cheri Magid
- Rogelio Martínez
- Molly Smith Metzler
- Janine Nabers
- Dan O'Brien
- Matthew Paul Olmos
- Edwin Sanchez
- Julian Sheppard
- Mat Smart
- Susan Soon He Stanton
- Lucy Thurber
- Sheri Wilner
- Leah Nanako Winkler

Primary Stages Einhorn School of Performing Arts (ESPA)

ESPA is open to all artists, in all stages of their careers.

ESPA offers a series of intensive classes in acting, playwriting, and directing taught by industry professionals that include PS staff members along with working professionals such as: Joshua Harmon, Winter Miller, Richard Topol, Judy Gold, Rogelio Martínez, Edwin Sanchez, and Morgan Jenness. Previous faculty members include Lucy Thurber, Julia Jordan, Brooke Berman, Dan O'Brien, Sarah Ruhl, Jessica Hecht, Tanya Barfield, Cusi Cram, and Judith Light. The school is run by the Primary Stages Associate Director of Education, Sarah Matteucci.

== Notable actors who have appeared with Primary Stages ==
- Jane Alexander
- Amy Aquino
- Elizabeth Ashley
- Mark Blum
- Charles Busch
- Kerry Butler
- L. Scott Caldwell
- Nell Campbell
- Lynn Cohen
- Michael Cristofer
- Brian Cox
- Michael Cumpsty
- Tim Daly
- Tyne Daly
- Daniel Davis
- Sandy Duncan
- Gregg Edelman
- Vera Farmiga
- Calista Flockhart
- Hallie Foote
- Arthur French
- Penny Fuller
- Jack Gilpin
- Joanna Gleason
- John Glover
- Randy Graff
- David Greenspan
- Charles Grodin
- Mamie Gummer
- Kate Hamill
- Edward W. Hardy
- Harriet Harris
- Randy Harrison
- Jayne Houdyshell
- Julie Halston
- Amy Irving
- Allison Janney
- Charles Kimbrough
- T.R. Knight
- Christine Lahti
- Nathan Lane
- Adriane Lenox
- David Margulies
- Carolyn McCormick
- Ellen McLaughlin
- John McMartin
- Gerald McRaney
- S. Epatha Merkerson
- Estelle Parsons
- Pamela Payton-Wright
- Larry Pine
- Billy Porter
- Isabella Rossellini
- Kyra Sedgwick
- Marian Seldes
- John Wesley Shipp
- Susan Sullivan
- Will Swenson
- Richard Thomas
- Leslie Uggams
- George Wendt
- Lillias White

== Production history ==
- Final Follies (A.R. Gurney)
- Downstairs (Theresa Rebeck)
- Feeding the Dragon (Sharon Washington)
- A Walk with Mr. Heifetz (James Inverne)
- Pride and Prejudice (Kate Hamill)
- The Gospel According to Thomas Jefferson, Charles Dickens and Count Leo Tolstoy: Discord (Scott Carter)
- Daniel's Husband (Michael McKeever)
- Fade (Tanya Saracho)
- The Roads to Home (Horton Foote)
- Exit Strategy (Ike Holter)
- The Body of and American (Dan O'Brien)
- Perfect Arrangement (Topher Payne)
- Informed Consent (Deborah Zoe Laufer)
- Lives of the Saints (David Ives)
- While I Yet Live (Billy Porter)
- Poor Behavior (Theresa Rebeck)
- The Tribute Artist (Charles Busch)
- The Model Apartment (Donald Margulies)
- Bronx Bombers (Eric Simonson)
- Harbor (Chad Beguelin)
- The Call (Tanya Barfield)
- All in the Timing (David Ives)
- Him (Daisy Foote)
- Harrison, TX: Three plays by Harton Foote (Horton Foote)
- The Morini Strad (Willy Holtzman)
- Rx (Kate Fodor)
- Olive and the Bitter Herbs (Charles Busch)
- Motherhood Out Loud (Leslie Ayvazian, Brooke Berman, David Cale, Jessica Goldberg, Beth Henley, Lameece Issaq, Claire LaZebnik, Lisa Loomer, Michele Lowe, Marco Pennette, Theresa Rebeck, Luanne Rice, Annie Weisman & Cheryl L. West)
- Secrets of the Trade (Jonathon Tolins)
- In Transit (Kristen Anderson-Lopez, James-Allen Ford, Russ Kaplan, and Sara Wordsworth)
- Black Tie (A.R. Gurney)
- A Lifetime Burning (Cusi Cram)
- The Night Watcher (Charlayne Woodard)
- Happy Now? (Lucinda Cox)
- Buffalo Gal (A.R. Gurney)
- A Body of Water (Lee Blessing)
- Love Child (Daniel Jenkins and Robert Stanton)
- Shipwrecked! An Entertainment (Donald Margulies)
- Chasing Manet (Tina Howe)
- Opus (Michael Hollinger)
- Dividing the Estate (Horton Foote)
- Hunting and Gathering (Brooke Berman)
- Something You Did (Willy Holtzman)
- Indian Blood (A.R. Gurney)
- Southern Comforts (Kathleen Clark)
- Adrift in Macao (Christopher Durang)
- Exits and Entrances (Athol Fugard)
- Dedication or The Stuff of Dreams (Terrence McNally)
- In The Continuum (Danai Gurira and Nikkole Salter)
- The Right Kind of People (Charles Grodin)
- A Safe Harbor for Elizabeth Bishop (Marta Goes)
- The Day Emily Married (Horton Foote)
- String of Pearls (Michele Lowe)
- Sabina (Willy Holtzman)
- Going To St. Ives (Lee Blessing)
- Strictly Academic (A. R. Gurney)
- The Stendhal Syndrome (Terrence McNally)
- Boy (Julia Jordan)
- Call The Children Home (Thomas Babe)
- The Fourth Wall (A.R. Gurney)
- One Million Butterflies (Stephen Belber)
- Romola & Nijinsky (Lynne Alvarez)
- An Immaculate Misconception (Carl Djerassi)
- One Shot, One Kill (Richard Vetere)
- Straight As a Line (Luis Alfaro)
- Krisit (Y York)
- No Niggers, No Jews, No Dogs (John Henry Redwood)
- Byrd's Boy (Bruce J. Robinson)
- Barefoot Boy with Shoes On (Edwin Sanchez)
- Elsa Edgar (Bob Kingdom with Neil Bartlett)
- An Empty Plate in the Café du Grand Bouef (Michael Hollinger)
- When They Speak of Rita (Daisy B. Foote)
- The Old Settler (John Henry Redwood)
- High Life (Lee MacDougall)
- The Turn of the Screw (Jeffrey Hatcher from the story by Henry James)
- Lips (Constance Congdon)
- This Lime Tree Bower (Conor McPherson)
- Brutality of Fact (Keith Reddin)
- Scotland Road (Jeffrey Hatcher)
- St. Nicholas (Conor McPherson)
- Nasty Little Secrets (Lanie Robertson)
- Missing/Kissing (John Patrick Shanley)
- Second-Hand Smoke (Mac Wellman)
- Not Waving (Gen LeRoy)
- Hate Mail (Bill Corbett and Kira Obolensky)
- Mere Mortals (David Ives)
- The Model Apartment (Donald Margulies)
- The Preservation Society (William S. Leavengood)
- Virgins & Other Myths (Colin Martin)
- Sabina (Willy Holtzman)
- Ancient History and English Made Simple (David Ives)
- Laughing Matters (Nick Ullett)
- You Should Be So Lucky (Charles Busch)
- I Sent a Letter to My Love (Melissa Manchester, Jeffrey Sweet)
- Don Juan in Chicago (David Ives)
- "2" Goering at Nuremberg (Romulus Linney)
- Breaking Up (Michael Cristofer)
- Crackdancing (Joseph Hindy)
- The Hyacinth Macaw (Mac Wellman)
- The Dolphin Position (Percy Granger)
- Bargains (Jack Heifner)
- Washington Square Moves (Matthew Witten)
- How She Played the Game (Cynthia L. Cooper)
- Olivia's Opus (Nora Cole)
- Joy Solution (Stuart Duckworth)
- Making Book (Janet Reed)
- A Murder of Crows (Mac Wellman)
- Lusting After Pepino's Wife (Sam Henry Kass)
- Better Days (Richard Dresser)
- Hollywood Scheherazade (Charlie Peters)
- Black Market (Joe Sutton)
- Bovver Boys (Willy Holtzman)
- Swim Visit (Wesley Moore)
- Sketchbook Series - Late Night Shows: Babel Stories; Matthew Maguire, The Traveling Squirrel (Robert Lord), The Secret Sits in the Middle (Lisa Maria Radano)
- At the Still Point (Jordan Roberts
- Nasty Little Secrets (Lanie Robertson)
- Algerian Romance (Kres Mersky)
- Cellophane (Mac Wellman)
- China Wars (Robert Lord)
- Ancient History (David Ives)
- Sketchbook Series - Late Night Political Comedy Sketches: The Thrill of Victory, The Agony of Debate (Joe DiPietro, Stephen Fife, Kathy Giamo and Mark Michaels)
- Stopping the Desert (Glen Merzer)
- The Wedding of the Siamese Twins (Burton Cohen)
- Angel Face (Laura Harrington)
- An Evening of Four One Acts:
- The Time I Died (Ron Carlson)
- Madame Zelena Finally Comes Clean (Ron Carlson)
- Lone Deer (Donald Wollner)
- Splitsville (Richard Dresser)
- Beyond Bloomingdale's (Diane Heles and Janet Reed)
- Florida Girls (Nancy Fitz-Hasty)
- Heavy Breathing (Scott Carter)
- Free Fall (Laura Harrington)
- Hidden Parts (Lynne Alvarez)
- Late One Afternoon in Okabena (Marjorie Mahle)
- In September Woods (David Hill)
- Bertrano or Hats Don't Lie (Charlie Peters)

== Broadway Transfers ==
Primary Stages has seen three Broadway transfers with its productions of In Transit in 2016, Bronx Bombers in 2014, and Dividing the Estate in 2008.
