= Primary Stages Einhorn School of Performing Arts =

New York school specialising in the performing arts

The Primary Stages Marvin and Anne Einhorn School of Performing Arts (ESPA) is an interdisciplinary institution in New York City that offers courses in Acting, Writing and Directing.

== History ==
ESPA developed from a collection of in-house playwriting classes at Primary Stages to a more formalized multidisciplinary institution with departments in acting, writing, and directing. Since its 2007 inception, the School has housed over two thousand students. The School, formally known as the Primary Stages School of Theater was renamed in 2010 in honor of two Primary Stages founding members, Marvin and Anne Einhorn.

All courses are taught by industry professionals that include Primary Stages staff members Casey Childs (Founder and Executive Producer of Primary Stages), Andrew Leynse (artistic director), Michelle Bossy (Associate Artistic Director).

== Instructors ==
Notable ESPA faculty members:

- David Adjmi
- Betsy Aidem
- Tanya Barfield
- B.H. Barry
- Brooke Berman
- Mark Blum
- David Caudle
- Casey Childs
- Cusi Cram
- Denny Dillon
- Joanna Gleason
- Randy Graff
- David Grimm
- Adam Gwon
- Jessica Hecht
- Harriet Harris
- Michael Hollinger
- Judith Ivey
- Morgan Jenness
- Julia Jordan
- Kait Kerrigan
- Lisa Kron
- Neil LaBute
- Michael Laibson
- Judith Light
- Bree Lowdermilk
- Craig Lucas
- Itamar Moses
- Dael Orlandersmith
- Sarah Ruhl
- Saviana Stanescu
- Lucy Thurber
- Kim Weild
- Sheri Wilner
- Mary Louise Wilson

== Special programs ==
Previous guests and Master Class instructors have included Judith Light, Craig Lucas, Neil LaBute, Pam MacKinnon, David Lindsay-Abaire, Alice Ripley, Jessica Hecht, Annie Baker and José Rivera.

Each Summer, the ESPA*Drills new play development program affords four ESPA playwrights the opportunity to workshop their plays at Primary Stages and present full readings. The playwrights work with ESPA actors and directors as well as other New York artists.

ESPA also offers frequent workshops, jam sessions, and opportunities for new works to be read.
