= Jeremiah Porter =

American actor

- Born: Jeremy Porter; February 14, 1998 (age 28); Manhattan, New York
- Occupations: Actor; dancer; singer
- Years active: 2015–present
- Known for: instagram Dance Videos, Kitchen Theatre Company's Original Play "Birds of East Africa"

Jeremiah Valentino Porter (born February 14, 1998) is an American actor, dancer and singer mostly known on Instagram for dance videos and his performance at the Barclays Center with Barbra Streisand in 2012. Porter was recently cast in the world premiere of 'Birds of East Africa' directed by Rachel Lampert, but is now attending Texas State University's Musical theatre program being led by actress Kaitlin Hopkins.

== Early life ==
Jeremiah Porter was born in Manhattan on February 14, 1998. After growing up in New York City and Lorton, Virginia, he currently resides in Brooklyn while enrolled in Texas State University. He is the only child of Corinne Douglas while his father, Jerry Porter has another daughter named Nakayla Porter. Porter attended the Professional Performing Arts School in Manhattan for drama in the fall of 2013. He attended the Metropolitan School of the Arts and was among the first class to have graduated from there in 2016. While attending school there he also attended the French Woods Festival of the Performing Arts each summer as part of his Musical theatre training.

== Career ==
On October 11, 2012, Porter was part of the Brooklyn Youth Chorus and performed in the three-hour concert performance before a crowd of 18,000 along with Barbra Streisand as part of the ongoing inaugural events of Barclays Center (and part of her current Barbra Live tour) in Brooklyn, New York as well as her first and only public performance in her home borough. Included in this performance was trumpeter Chris Botti, the Italian operatic trio Il Volo, and Barbra Streisand's son Jason Gould. Included in the concert were musical tributes by Streisand to Donna Summer and Marvin Hamlisch. The official confirmed attendees included Barbara Walters, Jimmy Fallon, Sting, Katie Couric, Woody Allen, Michael Douglas, the New York City mayor Michael Bloomberg, and designers Calvin Klein, Donna Karan, Ralph Lauren and Michael Kors.

Porter is best known for being cast in Kitchen Theatre Company's Original Play 'Birds of East Africa' written by Wendy Dann and directed by Rachel Lampert. This play premiered in February 2017 in Ithaca, New York.

February 12, 2017 Porter was cast as Finch in Red Mountain Theater's production of Newsies (musical). The production took place in Birmingham, Alabama, at the Alabama School of Fine Arts inside the Dorothy Jemison Theater. The production was a success, a sharp increase in attendees put the regional theater company in the spotlight in the summer of 2017. According to Broadway World, "Credit and kudos are well deserved to the energetic song and dance cast playing the "Newsies." . . . Their talent and commitment to the performances deserve the standing ovations you receive. These performers' song and dance skills are in caliber with any show on Broadway." The official confirmed attendees included Jordan Fisher.

On April 19, 2017, Porter was cast in Hangar Theatre's production of Cinderella (Opera) while being a member of the Tucker Davis Dance Company (based in Ithaca, New York).
