= Merrimack Repertory Theatre =

Theatre in Lowell, Massachusetts, US

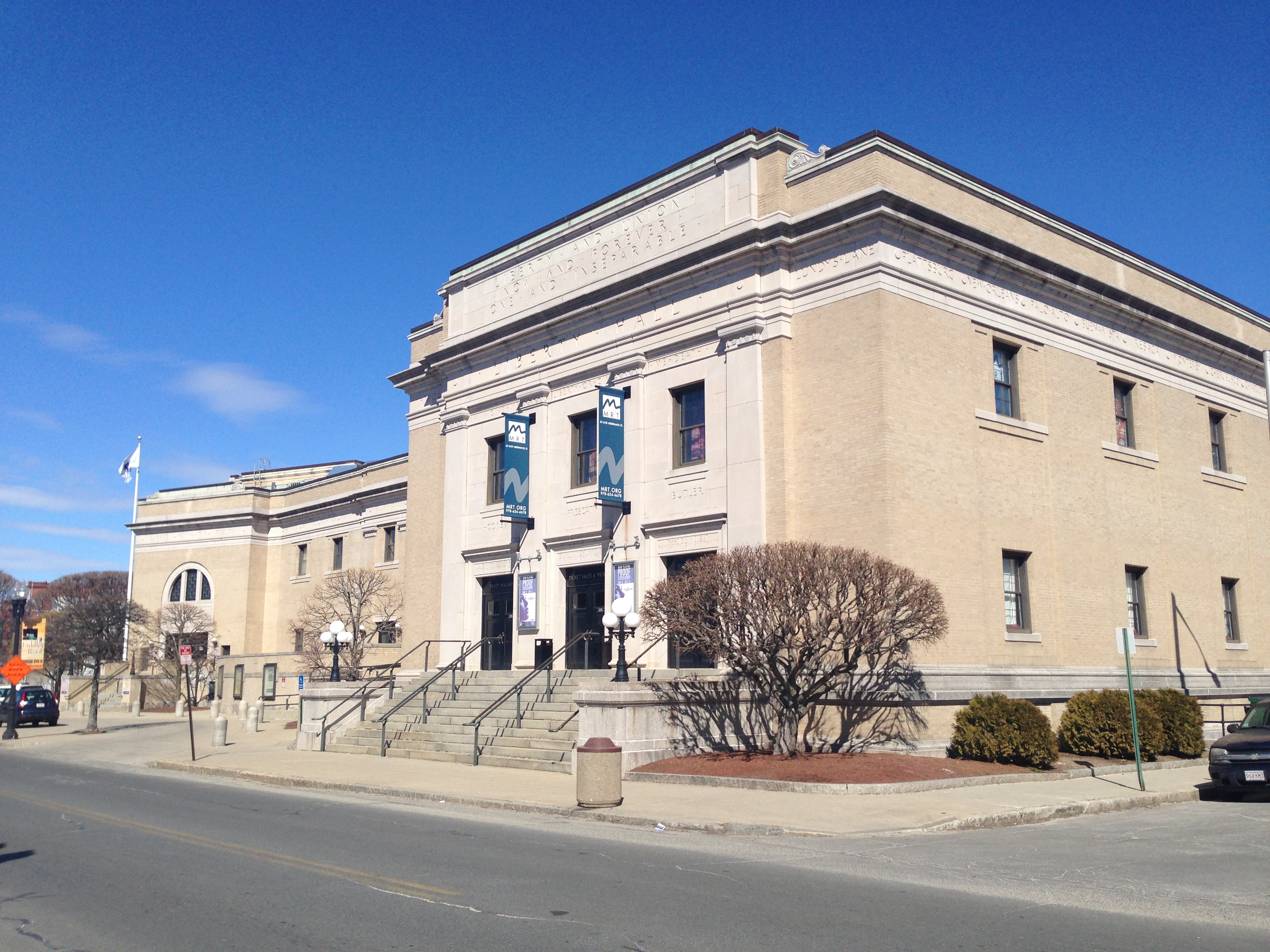
- Lowell's Liberty Hall, home of Merrimack Repertory Theatre. The Lowell Memorial Auditorium adjoins to the left. The building dates to 1922.
- Interactive map of Merrimack Repertory Theatre
- Address: 50 East Merrimack Street; Lowell, Massachusetts; United States
- Coordinates: 42.645068°N 71.304172°W
- Capacity: 279
- Type: Non-profit theatre

Construction
- Opened: 1979
- Years active: 1979-present

Website
- www.mrt.org

Merrimack Repertory Theatre (MRT) is a non-profit professional theatre located in Lowell, Massachusetts, United States. Known for its productions of contemporary work and world premieres, the company presents a September - May season of seven plays at the Nancy L. Donahue Theatre in the historic Liberty Hall, a 279-seat theatre located adjacent to the Lowell Memorial Auditorium. MRT is the only professional theatre company in the Merrimack Valley region of Massachusetts and New Hampshire, and one of three League of Resident Theatres (LORT) members in Massachusetts.

MRT operates under the leadership of the Nancy L. Donahue Executive Artistic Director Courtney Sale

== History ==
Merrimack Repertory Theatre was co-founded in 1979 by Barabara Abrahamian, John Briggs and Mark Kaufman, who had met while working at a New Hampshire summer stock theatre (where a young Michael Chiklis, a Lowell native who went on to appear in several MRT productions before moving on to a film career, was appearing in a production of Bye Bye Birdie). They conceived the idea of a professional non-profit theatre company in Lowell and formed the Committee for Legitimate Theatre in Lowell.

The company was incorporated as Merrimack Regional Theatre on February 1, 1979. MRT's first venue was Mahoney Hall at the University of Lowell (now University of Massachusetts Lowell). Its first production, The Passion of Dracula, opened on October 23, 1979. Nancy Donahue assumed presidency of the company. Kaufman and Briggs were the theatre's first producing artistic directors.

Dan Schay was hired as producing artistic director in 1982 and, in 1983, the company moved to its current location at Liberty Hall, changing its name to Merrimack Repertory Theatre. Schay produced MRT's first world premiere (Jack Neary's First Night) in 1987, and has been succeeded by David Kent (1989-2001), Charles Towers (2001-2015) and Sean Daniels (2015–present).

In 2012, the theatre underwent an extensive $750,000 renovation. Improvements included wider seats with more legroom (the overall number of seats was reduced from 309 to 279), a refurbished theatre lobby and concession area, and a larger, more accessible box office. The theatre was named in honor of founder Donahue.

Artistic leadership
Name	Years served
Mark Kaufman & John R. Briggs	1979-1982
Dan Schay	1982-1989
David Kent	1989-2001
Charles Towers	2001-2015
Sean Daniels	2015–present

Executive leadership
Name	Years served
Tom Parrish	2005-2011
Steven Leon	2011-2013
Elizabeth Kegley	2013–2017

=== Notable productions ===
- Bob Hall & David Richmond's The Passion of Dracula (1979, dir. Mark Kaufman), MRT's first production.
- Charles Dickens' A Christmas Carol was produced for 11 consecutive seasons, from 1983 to 1993.
- Jack Neary's First Night (1987, dir. Joan Courtney Murray), MRT's first world premiere.
- The Lowell Trilogy, a set of three works by the playwright Jon Lipsky, ran from 1992 to 1994. The trilogy includes Lipsky's original play Living in Exile (first presented at Boston's TheaterWorks), plus adaptations of Kerouac's Maggie Cassidy (Maggie's Riff) and Haing S. Ngor's Cambodian Odyssey (The Survivor: A Cambodian Odyssey).
- Bob Clyman's Secret Order (November 2007, dir. Charles Towers), was the first MRT production to make an Off-Broadway transfer.
- The world premiere staged reading of Lowell native Jack Kerouac's only play, Beat Generation (2012, dir. Charles Towers), in partnership with UMass Lowell. (The script had been uncovered in a New Jersey warehouse in 2005.)
- Michael Golamco's Year Zero (September 2014, dir. Kyle Fabel), brought several partnerships between MRT and organizations in Lowell's Cambodian-American community (the second-largest in the United States). Among these partners was the Angkor Dance Troupe (subject of the 2004 documentary Monkey Dance), which now regularly uses MRT's performance space in Liberty Hall.
- The Lion, singer-songwriter Benjamin Scheuer's award-winning musical memoir (also directed by Daniels), launched its national tour from MRT in August 2015, following runs in New York and London.
- Lauren Gunderson's I and You (October 2015, dir. Sean Daniels), which follows two teenagers on one night as they work through a school assignment on Walt Whitman's Leaves of Grass, was praised by The Boston Globe, which called it "Funny and moving by turns... suffused with a warmth that does not cloy, an intimacy that does not stifle, and a wit that connects it all together." The production ran Off-Broadway at 59E59 Theatres in January 2016.
- Sean Daniels’ The White Chip (January 2016, dir. Sheryl Kaller), a dark comedy stage memoir about the MRT artistic director's recovery from alcoholism, produced by the five-time Tony nominee Tom Kirdahy. Free admission was offered to individuals in recovery from addiction, sponsored by the local recovery organizations Lowell House, Megan's House and Massachusetts Organization for Addiction Recovery.

=== Production history ===
2006-07 season

- Augusta by Richard Dresser, directed by Charles Towers
- Aunt Dan & Lemon by Wallace Shawn, directed by Melia Bensussen
- Completely Hollywood (abridged) by Reed Martin and Austin Tichenor, directed by the Reduced Shakespeare Company
- Trying by Joanna McClelland Glass, directed by Kyle Fabel
- Dinah Was by Oliver Goldstick, directed by Charles Towers
- Syncopation by Allan Knee, directed by Maggie Mancinelli-Cahill
- Secret Order by Bob Clyman, directed by Charles Towers

2007-08 season

- The Pursuit of Happiness by Richard Dresser, directed by Charles Towers
- Tunney/Shakespeare in Six Rounds by David E. Lane (world premiere)
- 2 Pianos 4 Hands by Ted Dykstra and Richard Greenblatt, directed by Richard Greenblatt
- The Missionary Position by Keith Reddin, directed by Tracy Brigden
- A Delicate Balance by Edward Albee, directed by Charles Towers
- The Four of Us by Itamar Moses, directed by Kyle Fabel (world premiere)

2008-09 season

- The Fantasticks by Tom Jones and Harvey Schmidt, directed by Jonathan Silverstein and John Bell
- Skylight by David Hare, directed by Charles Towers
- A View of the Harbor by Richard Dresser, directed by Charles Towers
- Tranced by Bob Clyman, directed by Charles Towers
- Bad Dates by Theresa Rebeck, directed by Adrianne Krystansky
- A Moon for the Misbegotten by Eugene O'Neill, directed by Edward Morgan

2009-10 season

- Flings & Eros by the Flying Karamazov Brothers, directed by Paul magid (world premiere)
- The Seafarer by Conor McPherson, directed by Charles Towers
- Heroes by Gerald Sibleyras, adapted by Tom Stoppard, directed by Carl Forsman
- Fabuloso by John Kolvenbach, directed by Kyle Fabel
- Black Pearl Sings! by Frank Higgins, directed by Benny Ambush
- The Last Days of Mickey & Jean by Richard Dresser, directed by Charles Towers (World Premiere)
- The Blonde, the Brunette and the Vengeful Redhead by Robert Hewlett, directed by Melia Bensussen

2010-11 season

- The Complete World of Sports (abridged) by Reed Martin and Austin Tichenor, directed by Reed Martin and Austin Tichenor
- Four Places by Joel Drake Johnson, directed by Charles Towers
- Beasley's Christmas Party by C.W. Munger, directed by Carl Forsman
- Tryst by Karoline Leach, directed by Joe Brancato
- The Exceptionals by Bob Clyman, directed by Charles Towers (world premiere)
- Two Jews Walk Into a War... by Seth Rozin, directed by Melia Bensussen
- A Picasso by Jeffrey Hatcher, directed by Charles Towers

2011-12 season

- The Persian Quarter by Kathleen Cahill, directed by Kyle Fabel
- This Verse Business by A.M. Dolan, directed by Gus Kaikkonen
- The Ultimate Christmas Show (abridged) by Reed Martin & Austin Tichenor, directed by Reed Martin and Austin Tichenor
- The Voice of the Turtle by John Van Druten, directed by Carl Forsman
- Daddy Long Legs by Paul Gordon & John Caird, directed by John Caird
- Mrs. Whitney by John Kolvenbach, directed by Kyle Fabel
- Ghost-Writer by Michael Hollinger, directed by John Kolvenbach

2012-13 season

- Homestead Crossing by William Donnelly, directed by Kyle Fabel (world premiere)
- Beat Generation (staged reading) by Jack Kerouac, directed by Charles Towers (World Premiere)
- Memory House by Kathleen Tolan, directed by Melia Bensussen
- Half 'n Half 'n Half by John Kolvenbach, directed by Kyle Fabel
- Shakespeare's Will by Vern Thiessen, directed by Miles Potter
- Red by John Logan, directed by Charles Towers
- Proof by David Auburn, directed by Christian Parker
- Glengarry Glen Ross by David Mamet, directed by Charles Towers

2013-14 season

- God of Carnage by Yasmina Reza, directed by Kyle Fabel
- Mrs. Mannerly by Jeffrey Hatcher, directed by Mark Shanahan
- Stella and Lou by Bruce Graham, directed by Charles Towers
- The Devil's Music: The Life and Blues of Bessie Smith by Angelo Para, directed by Joe Brancato
- Equally Divided by Ronald Harwood, directed by Charles Towers
- Talley's Folly by Lanford Wilson, directed by Kyle Fabel
- The Complete History of Comedy (abridged) by Reed Martin and Austin Tichenor, directed by Reed Martin and Austin Tichenor

2014-15 season

- Year Zero by Michael Golamco, directed by Kyle Fabel
- Dusk Rings a Bell by Steven Belber, directed by Michael Bloom
- 13 Things About Ed Carpolott, book, music and lyrics by Barry Kleinbort, Based on a play by Jeffrey Hatcher, directed by Barry Kleinbort
- The Best Brothers by Daniel MacIvor, directed by Charles Towers
- Oceanside by Nick Gandiello, directed by Melia Bensussen (world premiere)
- Out of the City by Leslie Ayvazian, directed by Christian Parker
- The Outgoing Tide by Bruce Graham, directed by Charles Towers

2015-16 season

- The Lion by Benjamin Scheuer, directed by Sean Daniels
- I and You by Lauren Gunderson, directed by Sean Daniels
- It's a Wonderful Life: A Live Radio Play, adapted by Joe Landry, directed by Megan Sandberg-Zakian
- The White Chip by Sean Daniels, directed by Sheryl Kaller
- Tinker to Evers to Chance by Mat Smart, directed by Sean Daniels
- The Realness: a break beat play by Idris Goodwin, directed by Wendy C. Goldberg

2016-17 season MRT’S 38th season focused on local stories, with three of the seven productions on New England themes. The seven plays were:

- 45 Plays for 45 Presidents by Andy Bayiates, Sean Benjamin, Genevra Gallo-Bayiates, Chloë Johnston, and Karen Weinberg, directed by Sean Daniels
- Abigail/1702 by Roberto Aguirre-Sacasa, directed by Tlaloc Rivas
- Going to See the Kid by Steven Drukman, directed by Alexander Greenfield
- The Making of a Great Moment by Peter Sinn Nachtrieb, directed by Sean Daniels
- Women in Jeopardy! by Wendy MacLeod, directed by Sean Daniels
- Chill by Eleanor Burgess, directed by Megan Sandberg-Zakian
- My 80-Year-Old Boyfriend, Conceived and performed by Charissa Bertels, book and lyrics by Christian Duhamel, music and lyrics by Edward Bell, directed by Sean Daniels

2017-18 season MRT’S 39th season consisted of the following seven shows:

- The Royale by Marco Ramirez, directed by Megan Sandberg-Zakian
- Silent Sky by Lauren Gunderson, directed by Sean Daniels
- A Christmas Carol adapted by Tony Brown, directed by Megan Sandberg-Zakian
- KNYUM by Vichet Chum, directed by KJ Sanchez
- Lost Laughs: The Slapstick Tragedy of Fatty Arbuckle written by Andy Bayiates and Aaron Muñoz, directed by Nathan Keepers
- Little Orphan Danny originally conceived by Dan Finnerty; book, lyrics & music by Dan Finnerty; created by Dan Finnerty & Sean Daniels; additional Music by Dan Lipton
- The Villains’ Supper Club by Lila Rose Kaplan; directed by Sean Daniels

2018-19 season MRT'S 40th season consisted of the following seven shows:

- Native Gardens by Karen Zacarias, directed by Giovanna Sardelli
- Murder for Two by Joe Kinosian, book and lyrics by Kellen Blair, directed by Jo Clementz
- Miss Bennet: Christmas at Pemberly by Lauren Gunderson and Margot Melcon, directed by Bridget Kathleen O’Leary
- Slow Food (WORLD PREMIERE) by Wendy Macleod, directed by Sean Daniels
- The Heath (WORLD PREMIERE) by Lauren Gunderson, directed by Sean Daniels
- The Haunted Life (WORLD PREMIERE) by Jack Kerouac, adapted by Sean Daniels, directed by Sean Daniels and Christopher Osar Peña
- Cry It Out by Molly Smith Metzer, directed by Amanda Charlton

2019-20 season MRT's 41st season consisted of the following seven shows:

- Tiny Beautiful Things based on the book by Cheryl Strayed, adapted for the stage by Nia Vardalos, co-conceived by Marshall Heyman, Thomas Kail, and Nia Vardalos; directed by Jen Wineman
- Cambodian Rock Band by Lauren Yee, directed by Marti Lyons, featuring songs by Dengue Fever
- The Wickhams: Christmas at Pemberley by Lauren Gunderson and Margot Melcon, directed by Shana Gozansky
- Maytag Virgin by Audrey Cefaly, directed by Eleanor Holdridge
- Nina Simone: Four Women by Christina Ham, directed by Kenneth L. Roberson
- The Lowell Offering by Andy Bayiates and Genevra Gallo-Bayiates, directed by Jessica Hutchinson (not produced due to the global pandemic)
- Erma Bombeck: At Wit’s End by Allison Engel and Margaret Engel, directed by Terry Berliner (not produced due to the global pandemic)

2020-21 season MRT's 42nd season consisted of the following two shows, created virtually due to the global pandemic:

- A Woman of the World (video)
- Until the Flood (video)

2021-22 season MRT's 43rd season consisted of the following six shows:

- Wild Horses
- The Rise and Fall of Holly Fudge
- Erma Bombeck: At Wit’s End by Allison Engel and Margaret Engel, directed by Terry Berliner
- Back Together Again: the Music of Roberta Flack and Donny Hathaway
- Best Summer Ever
- Woody Sez

2022-23 season MRT's 44th season consisted of the following six shows:

- The 39 Steps
- Macbeth
- A Christmas Carol
- Letters from Home
- How High the Moon: the Music of Ella Fitzgerald

== Artistic development and patriot program ==
In 2015, Merrimack Repertory Theatre launched the Patriot Program, an artist residency program conceived by Artistic Director Sean Daniels. The MRT Patriots are a group of 69 theatre artists and professionals, from across the country, with access to short-term residencies at MRT throughout the year. The MRT Patriots use MRT resources and housing while developing new work for the stage.

== Education and community engagement ==
MRT offers student matinees (daytime performances available only to student groups). Many of these groups are eligible for grant funding through the Partners in Education program.

MRT has offered a summer youth theatre program called Young Company (originally Young Artists at Play) since 1997. Young Company was suspended for summer 2015, but was set to resume in July 2016 and to focus on participant-generated work. The program was to extend beyond the summer, with year-long student participation in workshops and open rehearsals at MRT.

In 2015, MRT launched the Cohort Club, an audience engagement program modeled after a similar initiative at Geva Theatre Center in Rochester, New York. The Cohort Club is composed of community members who are given access to a show's entire rehearsal and production process, and are then asked to write about their experiences in a format of their choice.

Other programs include post-show discussions and open-invite receptions before and after select performances.

== Selected awards ==
- 1989 - Boston Drama Critics Award for production of Waiting for Godot.
- 1990 - New England Theatre Award for Excellence.
- 1990-94 - Four Boston Drama Critics Awards for Filumeni.
- 1992-93 - The Survivor: A Cambodian Odyssey named Best Play at Humana Festival of New American Plays.
- 1996 - All in the Timing won Boston Drama Critics Award for Best Play
- 1996 - Hamlet won Best of Boston Award
- 1997 - 'night, Mother won Best of Boston
- 1998 - Nixon's Nixon won Best of Boston
- 2005 - Harold Pinter's The Homecoming named to the Best of 2005 list of the Boston Globe, Boston Phoenix, Boston Courant, Edge Boston and Lowell Sun.
- 2008 - A Delicate Balance received seven Independent Reviewers of New England Awards, including best production and best director for the artistic director Charles Towers.
- 2009 - Bad Dates won the Elliot Norton Award from the Boston Theatre Critics Association for Outstanding Solo Performance.
- 2010 - The Blonde, the Brunette and the Vengeful Redhead won an Independent Reviewers of New England Award for Best Solo Performance.
- 2012 - Daddy Long Legs won the Independent Reviewers of New England Award for Best Musical, Large Theatre.
