= Monkey Dance (disambiguation) =

Monkey Dance is a 2004 documentary film by Julie Mallozzi.

Monkey Dance may also refer to:

- Monkey (dance), a novelty dance from the early 1960s
- "The Monkey Dance", a track by The Wiggles on Hot Potatoes: The Best of the Wiggles
- Monkey Dance, an album by Soulfarm

== See also ==
- "Dance Monkey", a 2019 song by Tones and I
