= Mallozzi =

Mallozzi is an Italian surname. Notable people with the surname include:

- Joseph Mallozzi (born 1965), Canadian writer and producer
- Julie Mallozzi, American documentary filmmaker, producer, artist, and teacher
- Stephen Mallozzi (born 2001), American stock car racing driver
