= Edwin Sánchez =

Edwin Sánchez may refer to:

- Edwin Sánchez (footballer) (born 1990), Salvadoran footballer
- Edwin Sánchez (cyclist) (born 1983), Colombian cyclist
- Edwin Sanchez (playwright) (born 1955), Puerto Rican-born playwright
