= Hangar Theatre =

Theater in Ithaca, New York, US

Coordinates: 42°27′19.49″N 76°31′2.85″W

The Hangar Theatre is a non-profit, regional theatre located at 801 Taughannock Boulevard in Ithaca, NY. Its mainstage season and children's shows occur during the summer, but the Hangar, and other organizations, utilize the space year-round for special events. The tenets of the Hangar's mission statement are to enrich, enlighten, educate and entertain.

== History ==
The initial renovation of a municipal airport hangar into a theatre by Bill Carpenter, the Ithaca Youth Theatre, and Ithaca Fire Department was completed in 1969. Bill Carpenter was hired as the first director by the Chairman of the Ithaca Festival, Tom Niederkorn, and he worked for the Board of Directors of the festival for two years. The theatre was initially called the Hangar Playfair Theatre. It continued to be renovated thanks to a grant from Nelson Rockefeller and the joint efforts of the Ithaca Repertory Theatre, Cornell University, Ithaca College, and the City of Ithaca in 1975. In 1986, the Hangar received another grant from the New York State Natural Heritage Trust to build an adjacent set and costume shop. The Hangar’s capital campaign in 1995 raised more than $270,000 for additional improvements to the facility.

From 1982-1996, under the artistic leadership of Robert Moss from New York’s Playwrights Horizons, the Hangar achieved national recognition as a professional regional theatre that produced plays and served as a learning environment for young theatre professionals. In 1988, the Hangar’s directing internship program expanded when the Drama League Project began sent emerging directors to the Hangar to direct plays in The Wedge; in 1989 the Hangar’s Lab Company was formed.

Mark Ramont served as artistic director from 1997-2000 during a period of creative growth for the Hangar. At the same time, under Education Director Lisa Bushlow from 1991-2000, the Hangar became recognized throughout New York State and across the country for its comprehensive, year-round theatre education programs. In 2000, the Board appointed Lisa as the Hangar’s first executive director, at which time she recommended Kevin Moriarty as the artistic director. Under their leadership the Hangar added a New Play Festival in 2001, the Hangar tent and Starlight Café in 2002, and expanded artistic and educational programming, including the commissioning of new plays.

The Hangar Theater for All Seasons met a $4.6 million goal in its 2010 capital campaign for a building renovation, creating a year-round home for Hangar Theater Company's productions. Today, the Hangar brings a range of theatre experiences to students across New York State, with the School Tour and Artists-in-the-Schools programs. Throughout the summer, KIDDSTUFF performances and the Next Generation School of Theatre reach thousands of young people. The Hangar currently serves approximately 60,000 adults and children annually.

Robert Moss returned as Interim Artistic Director for Hangar's summer 2008 season; Peter Flynn was named Artistic Director in August, 2008. Josh Friedman, the serving Managing Director, assumed the role in 2012. During 2012, Stephanie Yankwitt served as the Acting Artistic Director through the end of the Mainstage season. Jen Waldman assumed the role of Artistic Director in 2013.

Michael Barakiva served the role of Artistic Director from 2015-2020. Shirley Serotsky joined the Hangar in 2019 as the Associate Artistic Director and Education Director. In 2020, she worked as the interim Artistic Director after Michael Barakiva left the position, and began working as the Artistic Director in 2021.

In 2025, the Hangar Theatre was granted $250,000 in state funding for renovations through the New York Senate's Community Resiliency, Economic Sustainability, and Technology Program from state senator Lea Webb. 2025 marked the theatre's 50th year anniversary.

== Collaboration with Ithaca College ==
The Hangar Theatre Company experienced an extraordinary challenge as the New York State went into lockdown in March 2020. The theatre proposed delivering a collection of streaming shows after partnering with Ithaca College Associate Professor Chrissy Guest and alumnus Griffin Schultz. As a result of this collaboration, the Hangar Theatre Company presented its first virtual play, Thornton Wilder's "The Skin of Our Teeth," presented on May 23, 2020 to an audience of 400 people.

== Seasons ==
=== Mainstage ===
==== 2011 ====
- Rounding Third
- Ragtime
- Ever So Humble
- Gem of the Ocean
- The Rocky Horror Show

==== 2012 ====
- Lend Me a Tenor
- Titanic
- Full Gallop
- Next to Normal
- The Trip to Bountiful

==== 2013 ====
- Last of the Red Hot Lovers
- Gypsy
- 4000 Miles
- Clybourne Park

==== 2014 ====
- Red
- Around the World in 80 Days
- Little Shop of Horrors
- Other Desert Cities

==== 2015 ====
- God of Carnage - By Yasmina Reza
- Spring Awakening
- The Hound of the Baskervilles
- Talley's Folly

==== 2016 ====
- I Loved, I Lost, I Made Spaghetti - Adapted by Jacques Lamarre from the memoir by Giulia Melucci
- In The Heights - by Lin-Manuel Miranda
- Third - by Wendy Wasserstein
- Constellation - by Nick Payne

==== 2017 ====
- Disgraced - by Ayad Akhtar
- A Funny Thing Happened on the Way to the Forum - by Stephen Sondheim
- Dégagé - by Mimi Quillin
- The Foreigner - by Larry Shue
- Shakespeare’s R & J - Adapted by Joe Calarco

==== 2018 ====
- Fortune - by Deborah Zoe Laufer
- Chicago - by Fred Ebb, Bob Fosse & John Kander
- Pride and Prejudice - Adapted by Kate Hamill
- A Doll's House, Part 2 - by Lucas Hnath
- Xanadu - by Douglas Carter Beane, John Farrar & Jeff Lynne
- Charles Dicken's A Christmas Carol - Adapted by Aoise Stratford

==== 2020 (virtual) ====
- The Skin of Our Teeth
- Uncommon Excerpts and Others: The Wendy Chronicles - by Wendy Wasserstein, compiled by Michael Barakiva
- Queens Girl in the World- by Caleen Sinnette Jennings
- Honk Your Horn
- Sense and Sensibility - adapted by Kate Hamill

==== 2021 (outdoors) ====
- The REALNESS: another break beat play - by Idris Goodwin
- Once - by Enda Walsh, Glen Hansard, and Markéta Irglová
- Sweeney Todd - by Hugh Wheeler and Stephen Sondheim
- Queens Girl In The World - by Caleen Sinnette Jennings
- An Odyssey - co-produced with The Cherry Arts

==== 2023 ====
- What the Constitution Means to Me - by Heidi Schreck. Co-produced with Kitchen Theatre Company
- Billy Elliot - by Elton John & Lee Hall
- The Impossible Dream, A Broadway Pops Concert: 49 Years of Hangar Theatre History

==== 2024 ====
- Ride the Cyclone - by Brooke Maxwell & Jacob Richmond
- Ragtime - by Stephen Flaherty, Lynn Ahrens, and Terrence McNally
- Todd vs. The Titanic - by Joe Kinosian, Kellen Blair, and Scott Rothman

==== 2025 ====
- Million Dollar Quarter - by Colin Escott and Floyd Mutrux
- Waitress - by Jessie Nelson
- Ms. Holmes & Ms. Watson - by Kate Hamill

=== KIDDSTUFF ===
==== 2011 ====
- Alice in Wonderland
- If You Give a Pig a Pancake
- Click Clack Moo: Cows That Type
- Goodnight Moon
- Willy Wonka Jr.

==== 2012 ====
- The Little Mermaid
- The Adventures of the Dish and the Spoon
- Junie B. Jones in Jingle Bells
- Batman Smells!
- How I Became a Pirate
- Seussical Jr.

==== 2013 ====
- PINKALICIOUS the Musical
- With Two Wings
- A Year With Frog and Toad
- James and the Giant Peach
- The Wiz

==== 2014 ====
- Yo
- Vikings
- Bunnicula
- Hare and Tortoise
- The Little Prince
- The Pirates of Penzance Jr.

==== 2015 ====
- The Emperor's New Clothes
- Stuart Little
- Red Riding Hood
- Charlotte's Web
- Bye Bye Birdie

==== 2016 ====
- Journey to Oz
- The Lion, The Witch, and The Wardrobe
- Louis Braille
- The Velveteen Rabbit
- My Son Pinocchio Jr.

==== 2017 ====
- Lilly's Plastic Purple Purse
- Furry Tails, With a Twist
- The Journey of Lewis and Clark and Other Tales from Way Out West
- Aesop's Fables
- Alice in Wonderland Jr.

==== 2018 ====
- Playing Peter Pan - by Christopher Parks
- The Amazing Tale of the Backyard Overnight Adventure - by Rachel Lampert
- The Transition of Doodle Pequeño - by Gabriel Jason Dean
- Snow White - by Marjorie Sokoloff
- Seussical Jr. - by Lynn Ahrens & Stephen Flaherty

== Education Programming ==
The Hangar Theatre promotes arts education through year-long programming for children and families.

=== KIDDSTUFF ===
Every year the Hangar Theatre features live theatre based on favorite children's books and stories that is created for young audiences. The KIDDSTUFF season occurs during the summer and usually features five performances, the last of which is performed by students of the Hangar's Next Generation summer theatre camp.

=== Next Generation ===
Next Generation is a summer camp for students entering grades 3-12. The camp offers a wide variety of classes taught by professional artists who work nationally in the performing arts. Students of the camp are featured in the last KIDDSTUFF production of the season.

=== Spring Break-a-Leg ===
Spring Break-a-Leg is a week-long camp for students in 4th through 6th grade. At the end of the camp, students present an original musical theatre piece.

=== Artists-in-Schools and School Tours ===
The Hangar offers programs that bring theatre arts into the schools of children in the Ithaca area. Artists-in-Schools initiatives bring Hangar artists into elementary and middle schools to collaborate with classrooms in creating original plays with music.

School tours present theatre arts productions at schools in the Ithaca, NY area. "We Carry the Dream", a new play based on the life and work of Martin Luther King Jr., toured Newfield Elementary School, Dryden Elementary School, Lansing Elementary School, Groton Elementary School and Trumansburg Elementary School in March 2013.

== Lab Company and Lab Academy ==
=== The Lab Company ===
Since 1989 the Hangar Theatre has been home to the Lab Company, a theatre-training program for young professionals in acting, directing, choreography, design, and play writing. The Lab Company is a training ground for emerging artists where the focus is on professional experience, preparing new artists for a career in the theatre.

Lab Company actors work in the Hangar Mainstage & KIDDSTUFF series, as well as develop new work in the Hangar Pilot Reading Series, over the course of one summer.

=== The Lab Academy ===
The Lab Academy, created in 2013, is geared towards advanced undergraduate actors, directors, dramaturgs, playwrights, and choreographers with an emphasis in education. All Lab Academy members participate in multiple master classes and workshops in acting, collaboration, voice and speech, dance, movement, and professional skills taught by professional artists from across the nation.

Lab Academy actors act in the Hangar's experimental Wedge Theatre, its KIDDSTUFF series, and work projects throughout the summer. Academy actors may also understudy Mainstage roles. Academy Directors, Dramaturgs, Playwrights, & Choreographers participate in the same classes with the rest of the company. They participate in one MAINSTAGE experience, as well as projects in their particular field of study.
