= Perfect Couple =

(The or A) Perfect Couple may refer to:

- A Perfect Couple (1979 film), a film directed by Robert Altman
- A Perfect Couple (1998 film), a Spanish comedy film
- A Perfect Couple (play), a 2008 play by Brooke Berman
- The Perfect Couple (1954 film), a West German comedy film
- The Perfect Couple (2007 film), a South Korean film
- "The Perfect Couple" (The Inside), an episode of The Inside
- "The Perfect Couple" (The O.C.), an episode of The O.C.
- "The Perfect Couple", a song by Paul Heaton from Fat Chance
- "Cặp đôi hoàn hảo", the Vietnamese version of TV series Just the Two of Us
- Perfect Couples, a 2010-2011 American sitcom
- The Perfect Couple (TV series), a 2024 television series
