= New Repertory Theatre =

Regional theater company in Boston, U.S.

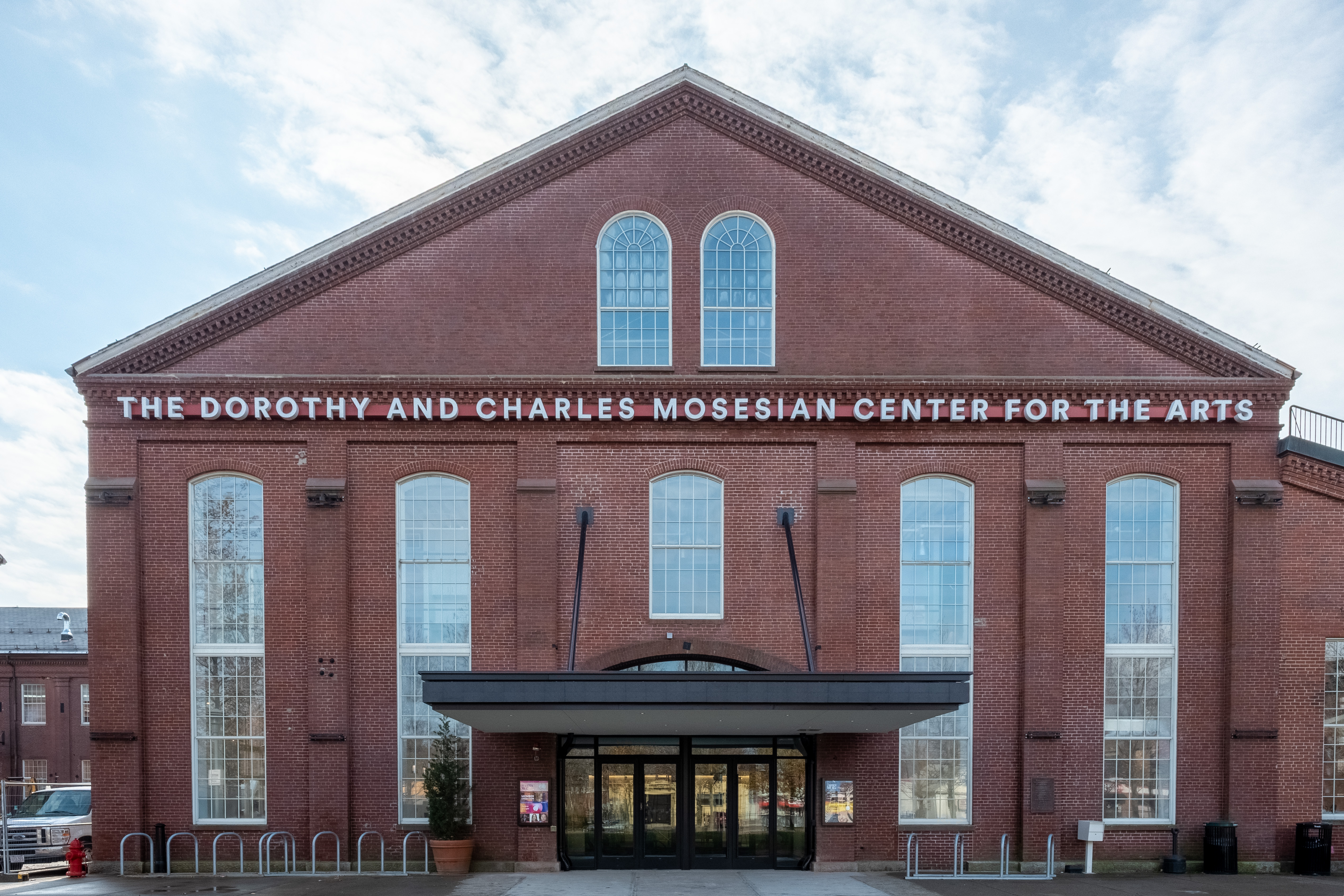
- Interactive map of New Repertory Theatre
- Address: 321 Arsenal St; Watertown, Massachusetts; U.S.
- Coordinates: 42°21′46″N 71°09′53″W
- Capacity: 430

Construction
- Opened: 1984

Website
- newrep.org

The New Repertory Theatre (New Rep) was a Boston-area regional theater company founded in 1984, it produced more than 70 East Coast, US, or World premieres. Starting in 2005, New Rep was the resident company at the Mosesian Center for the Arts in Watertown, MA. It created productions for the 340-seat Main Stage Theater, the 90-seat Black Box Theater, and its outreach program, New Rep Classic Repertory Company, performed for over 14,000 students, many from underserved communities, each year. In 2019, Michael J. Bobbitt was appointed as executive artistic director. In April 2021, New Rep named M. Bevin O’Gara its interim executive artistic director, as Bobbitt moved to the position of executive director for the Massachusetts Cultural Council.

New Rep's Next Voices Playwriting Fellowship sponsored playwrights each year to develop new work. Recent fellows include Walt McGough, John Minigan, Ellen O'Brien, Lila Rose Kaplan, and Patrick Gabridge. In 2020, during the COVID-19 Pandemic, New Rep transitioned from live to virtual performances and later the next year featured outdoor performances at the Arsenal on the Charles. In July 2021, the theatre announced it would be suspending operations due to pandemic related challenges. In 2022, the company announced it would be producing two shows for the 2022 season; We Celebrate: Storytelling through Song, Music, and Sound at the Mosesian Center Main Stage, and Solo Moments in New Reps Black Box Theater.

In 2023, the company's board announced they would be shutting down, citing fundraising difficulties.
