= Unmerciful Good Fortune =

Play by Edwin Sanchez

Unmerciful Good Fortune is a play by Puerto Rican-born playwright Edwin Sanchez which premiered in Chicago in 1996. It tells the story of friendship between Maritza Cruz, an assistant district attorney, and Fatima Garcia, a woman claiming to be clairvoyant who has killed 28 people.

== Reception ==
The play won the AT&T On Stage New Play Award.

A 2001 review in Back Stage magazine called the play "poetic...a deeply moving love story and tragedy". A review in The New York Times said that "the conflicts that the conflicts that interest Mr. Sanchez – ones between good girl and bad, obedient daughter and independent woman, heterosexual and homosexual, and most pertinently, between Latina and American – are thoughtfully enmeshed".

== Film adaptation ==
In December 2024, Rosario Dawson announced that she was producing and starring in a film adaptation of Unmerciful Good Fortune, described as "a supernatural horror thriller". The film would be directed by film editor Tirsa Hackshaw in her directorial debut. In November 2025, Scott Eastwood and Susan Sarandon joined the cast.
