= PlayPenn =

PlayPenn is a new play development conference located in Philadelphia, Pennsylvania. Che'Rae Adams is the Artistic Director, along with Associate Artistic Directors, Susan Dalian and Santiago Iacinti. PlayPenn works with playwrights to develop new plays in a collaborative and supportive workshop environment.

Since PlayPenn's first conference in 2005, the organization has been hosting annual July conferences in Philadelphia, where invited playwrights work with actors, directors, dramaturgs and designers to rehearse, revise and develop their new scripts in workshops. The conference includes free public readings of the plays, as well as forums and symposia.

PlayPenn has helped develop over 150 new plays, 60% of which have become over 350 full productions at theater companies in the United States and abroad. Playwrights who have workshopped scripts at PlayPenn include Jeffrey Hatcher, Deb Margolin, Aaron Posner, Michael Hollinger, Samuel D. Hunter, J.T. Rogers, and Lauren Yee. In 2017, PlayPenn saw the first of its plays to go to Broadway, J.T. Rogers' Oslo, which won the Tony Award for Best Play.

PlayPenn supports playwrights through The Foundry, its three-year membership program to support emerging playwrights in Philadelphia with professional development, networking opportunities, and exposure. PlayPenn also offers classes and workshops during other months throughout the year, as well as consultations and support for playwrights from dramaturgs and editors.

== History ==
Paul Meshejian, an actor and director, created PlayPenn in 2005 after working at the Playwrights' Center in Minneapolis. Michele Volansky has been his artistic partner since the beginning as associate artist and dramaturg. Meshejian said he wanted to create an encouraging space for writers, he told Jessica Foley of American Theatre (magazine) in 2015. "We'll feed you, provide lodging, so you ... can just write your play."

While PlayPenn's main goal is to nurture new plays, not necessarily to lead them to productions, PlayPenn scripts have become full productions at many Philadelphia theaters, as well as at other theaters around the country.

In 2014, PlayPenn began entering into partnerships with theater companies to help guide plays through the last phases of development before a formal production. The organization began by pairing with the Playwrights Theatre of New Jersey to shepherd the play The House That Jack Built by Suzanne Bradbeer.

In 2018, PlayPenn artistic director Paul Meshejian was honored with the Lifetime Achievement Award at the Barrymore Awards for Excellence in Theatre.

In 2019, supported by a meaningful gift from Leonard Haas and the Wyncote Foundation, PlayPenn established the Haas Fellows Program, honoring each of its six Conference playwrights with the title "Haas Fellow" into the unforeseeable future.

== Conferences ==
For the 2018 PlayPenn conference, over 800 playwrights applied and six were chosen for workshops and free public readings. The conference also includes readings of up to three additional theatrical works in progress, along with forums where participants discuss issues related to new-play development.

== Playwrights and plays ==
Plays developed by PlayPenn, 2005–2019:

2005

- Act a Lady by Jordan Harrison
- On Clarion by Lydia Stryk
- The Overwhelming by J.T. Rogers
- We Are Not These Hands by Sheila Callaghan

2006

- A Scream by Gina Barnett
- Bad for the Jews by Peter Morris
- Malignancy by Eric R. Pfeffinger
- Scarcity by Lucy Thurber

2007

- After Adam by Christina Ham
- Bubu the Terrible by Rick DesRochers
- Carlo vs. Carlo by Aaron Cromie
- The Day of the Picnic by Russell Davis
- Militant Language by Sean Christopher Lewis
- My Name is Asher Lev by Aaron Posner
- The Rant by Andrew Case
- There or Here by Jennifer Maisel

2008

- A Human Equation by Peter Bonilla
- Another Man’s Son by Silva Semerciyan
- Any Given Monday by Bruce Graham
- The Beef by Katie Grey
- Breadcrumbs by Jennifer Haley
- Dear Brutus by Jeffrey Hatcher
- House of Gold by Gregory Moss
- Saving Grace (now entitled Salvation) by James McClindon
- Wildflower by Lila Rose Kaplan

2009

- 410 Gone by Frances Ya-Chu Cowhig
- Appetite by Arden Kass
- Ghost-Writer by Michael Hollinger
- The Morini Strad by Willy Holtzman
- The Specificity of Paradise by John Orlock
- Two Jews Walk Into a War by Seth Rozin
- We Three by Mary Hamilton
- Blood and Gifts by J.T. Rogers

2010

- Clementine in the Lower Nine by Dan Dietz
- Cowboy/Indian by Matt Ocks
- Etched in Skin on a Sunlit Night by Kara Lee Corthron
- Hum by Nicholas Wardigo
- Imagining Madoff by Deb Margolin
- Love and Communication by James J. Christy
- Raising Jo by Charlotte Miller
- Some Other Kind of Person by Eric R. Pfeffinger
- The Outgoing Tide by Bruce Graham
- The Whale by Samuel D. Hunter

2011

- American Wee-Pie by Lisa Dillman
- Another Girl by John Yearley
- At the Edge of a Promised Land by Jesse Bernstein
- Chasing Waves by Quinn Eli
- The Electric Baby by Stefanie Zadravec
- The Hatmaker’s Wife formerly A Man, His Wife, and His Hat by Lauren Yee
- Nerine by Brian Quirk
- Slip/Shot by Jacqueline Goldfinger

2012

- A Discourse on the Wonders of the Invisible World by Liz Duffy Adams
- Barcelona by Bess Wohl
- G.O.B. by Willy Holtzman
- Household Spirits by Mia McCullough
- My Tidy List of Terrors by Jonathan James Norton
- Seven Spots on the Sun by Martin Zimmerman
- The Three Christs of Manhattan by Seth Rozin
- Too Much, Too Much, Too Many by Meghan Kennedy

2013

- Cockfight by Peter Gil-Sheridan
- The First Mrs. Rochester by Willy Holtzman
- Informed Consent by Deborah Zoe Laufer
- The Most Spectacularly Lamentable Trial of Miz Martha Washington by James Ijames
- No Such Thing by Lisa Dillman
- Profiles by Joe Waechter
- Terminus by Gabriel Jason Dean
- Uncanny Valley by Thomas Gibbons

2014

- A Scar by Anne Marie Cammarato
- Behind the Motel by Emily Schwend
- Cattle Barn, Hoochie Coo by Davey Strattan White
- The Dizzy Little Dance of Russell DiFinaldi by Stephen Belber
- Honor Flight by Willy Holtzman
- The House That Jack Built by Suzanne Bradbeer
- Moon Cave by Douglas Williams
- Mr. Wheeler’s by Rob Zellers
- Wild Blue by Jen Silverman

2015

- Giantess by Genne Murphy
- Human Error by Eric Pfeffinger
- Oslo by J.T. Rogers
- Prince Max’s Trewly Awful Trip to the Desolat Interior by Ellen Struve
- r/LYPSE: a subreddit of our dark lips and heart by Brian Grace-Duff
- Shitheads by Douglas Williams
- War Stories by Richard Dresser
- White by James Ijames
- Widower by David J. Jacobi

2016

- Another Kind of Silence by Lauren Feldman
- Flat Sam by Antoinette Nwandu
- The Found Dog Ribbon Dance by Dominic Finocchiaro
- Heartland by Gabriel Jason Dean
- Heavenly Cosmic by Meghan Kennedy
- Poor Edward by Jonathan Payne
- Sensitive Guys by MJ Kaufman
- Suicide Jockey by Lena Barnard

2017

- Bobby James by Anne Marie Cammarato
- Bottle Fly by Jacqueline Goldfinger
- Galilee by Christine Evans
- Hard Cell by Brent Askari
- House of the Negro Insane by Terence Anthony
- Pancake Queen by Brie Knight
- penny candy by Jonathan James Norton
- Replica by Mickey Fisher
- Thirst by C.A. Johnson
- Welcome to Fear City by Kara Lee Corthron
- With by Carter W. Lewis

2018

- Bruise & Thorn by J. Julian Christopher (now C. Julian Jimenez)
- Tha Chink-Mart by Ray Yamanouchi
- Dimenticar by Mattie Hawkinson
- Down in the Holler by Val Dunn
- The Garbologists by Lindsay Joelle
- Honor Flight by Willy Holtzman
- Joan by Stephen Belber
- Kids Drop (Off) by Dominic Anthony Taylor
- Ripe Frenzy by Jennifer Barclay
- TJ Loves Sally 4 Ever by James Ijames
- You, The Fire, and Me by Sevan K. Greene

2019

- Archipelago by Amy Witting
- Buffalo Bill or How To Be A Good Man by Meghan Kennedy
- Cave Canem by A. Emmanuel Leadon
- Esther Choi and the Fish that Drowned by Stephanie Kyung Sun Walters
- The Haunted Life by Sean Daniels adapted from the novel by Jack Kerouac
- Homeridae by A.Z. Espinoza
- How a Boy Falls by Steven Dietz
- Incendiary by Dave Harris
- The Piper by Kate Hamill
- Strange Men by Will Snider
- Wayfinding by Whitney Rowland

== See also ==
- Culture of Philadelphia
