= Without Skin or Breathlessness =

Play by Tanya Barfield

Without Skin or Breathlessness is playwright Tanya Barfield's anthologized one-woman performance piece. It concerns a white mother reflecting on the childhood of her biracial (half-black) child. The performance was included in the solo performance anthology O Solo Homo.

It was performed in 1996 at P.S. 122.
