= Willy Holtzman =

American dramatist

William Scott Holtzman
- Born: June 1951 (age 75); St. Louis, MO
- Occupation: Playwright

Willy Holtzman (born 1951) is an American playwright and screenwriter, often focusing on theatrical representations of actual historical events. Holtzman has received two Pulitzer Prize nominations, a Humanitas Prize, a Writers Guild Award, a Peabody Award, as well as an HBO Award at the National Playwrights Conference.

== Personal life ==
Willy Holtzman was born and raised as the second of three children in St. Louis, Missouri. Holtzman moved to Middletown, Connecticut in 1969 to attend Wesleyan University, where he majored in American Studies. After graduation, he moved to Wilton, Connecticut, where he lives with his wife, Sylvia Shepard.

== Career ==
Many of Holtzman's plays have been developed through the PlayPenn New Play Conference. Holtzman's plays have been produced in New York at Primary Stages Theater, Theatre for a New Audience, and the Working Theater. He has been produced regionally at the Long Wharf Theatre, City Theatre, People's Light and Theatre Company, Baltimore Center Stage, Portland Stage Company, the Alliance Theatre, Geva Theatre, the Cleveland Play House, Berkshire Theatre Festival, The Colony Theatre, and Northlight Theatre. In 2007 he helped Bonnie Dickinson and her Wilton High School Theatre Arts students create Voices in Conflict, a play about returning Iraq and Afghanistan war veterans which ran at the Public Theater, the Vineyard Theatre and the Culture Project. In his 2011 work The Morini Strad, a play inspired by a true story that rocked the classical music world, Holtzman dramatizes the concert violinist Erica Morini's hiring of an unassuming violin maker to restore her legendary Stradivarius.The play received its European premiere in March of 2024 at Die Freie Buhne Wieden in Vienna.Morini Strad Dazzles Theater Goer

He taught as a visiting artist at Bronx Regional High School in the South Bronx, 1987–89, and was Resident Playwright at Juilliard School, 1990–92. He has worked with the 52nd Street Project in New York's Hell's Kitchen and on the Navajo Reservation. Holtzman is a former member of New Dramatists and now serves on its board of directors. He is also on the board of Harlem Stage Company.

== Writing credits ==
Plays:

- Hard Road to Heaven (2025 musical with David Spangler and Marty Dodson)
- Sabina (2022 musical with Louise Beach and Darrah Cloud)
- Trauma Queen (2019 musical with Crystal Bowersox and Marty Dodson)
- Smart Blonde (2014)
- The First Mrs. Rochester (2014)
- G.O.B. (2013)
- The Morini Strad (2011) published by Broadway Play Publishing Inc.
- The Real McGonagall (2011)
- Something You Did (2008) published by Broadway Play Publishing Inc.
- Hearts (2000) (Barrymore Award, Arthur Miller Award)
- Sabina (1996)
- Bovver Boys (1991)
- The Closer (1991)
- Blanco (1989)
- San Antonio Sunset (1989)
- Inside Out (1987)

Film:

- Edge of America (2004)
  - Accolades: (Sundance Film Festival, 2004 Opening Night Selection, Tribeca Film Festival, Nantucket Film Festival, Hampton Film Festival, American Indian Film Festival - Best Picture)

TV:

- Lifestories: Families in Crisis (3 episodes, 1992–1994)
  - Brotherly Love: The Trevor Ferrell Story (1994)
  - A Body to Die For: The Aaron Henry Story (1994) (Emmy Nomination)
  - Blood Brothers: The Joey DiPaolo Story (1992) (Cine Golden Eagle Award, Cable Ace Award)

== Awards ==
- 2006 Humanitas Award Winner, Children's Live-Action Category (Edge of America)
- 2006 Writers Guild Award Winner, Children's Script Long Form (Edge of America)
- 2005 Peabody Award Winner
