= Pull My Daisy =

1959 film by Robert Frank

- Directed by: Robert Frank; Alfred Leslie
- Written by: Jack Kerouac
- Narrated by: Jack Kerouac
- Edited by: Leon Prochnik; Robert Frank; Alfred Leslie
- Distributed by: G-String Productions
- Release date: 1959
- Country: United States
- Language: English

Pull My Daisy is a 1959 American black and white short film directed by Robert Frank and Alfred Leslie and starring Allen Ginsberg, Gregory Corso and Peter Orlovsky. It was adapted by Jack Kerouac from the third act of his play, Beat Generation.

== Plot ==
Based on an incident in the life of Beat icon Neal Cassady and his wife, the writer and painter Carolyn, the film tells the story of a railway brakeman whose wife invites a respected bishop over for dinner. However, the brakeman's bohemian friends crash the party, with comic results.

== Cast ==
- Jack Kerouac as narrator
- Richard Bellamy as bishop (as Mooney Peebles)
- Allen Ginsberg as Alan (as Alan Ginsberg)
- Gregory Corso as Gregory
- Peter Orlovsky as Peter (as Peter Orlofsky)
- Larry Rivers as Milo
- Delphine Seyrig as Milo's wife (as Beltiane)
- David Amram as Mez McGillicuddy
- Alice Neel as bishop's mother (as Alice Neal)
- Sally Gross as bishop's sister
- Denise Parker as girl in bed
- Pablo Frank as little boy

== Production ==
The plot of the film was originally conceived as the third act of Kerouac's stage play Beat Generation. In a 1957 letter to Cassady, Kerouac outlines his original idea for the play:

"[...] it's the story of ACT ONE You and Al Hinkle walk in Al Sublette's kitchen play chess while Al and I toast Khayyam tokay and Charley Mew figures horses, Connie standing around, finally you and Charley and me play flute solos straight off that Visions of Neal tape of 1952... crazy scene. Second ACT: You and me alone at races, playing third choice, Pulido, dreams, talk, Cayce, girls, beer in cartons, etc. including the horse that spilled in the back-stretch and nobody cared -- ACT THREE the night of the Bishop with Donovan, Bev, Carolyn, Allen, Peter, you, me, Bishop, Bishop's mother and aunt but all of it changed to Lynbrook L.l. to New York Scene and the Bishop is "of the New Aramean church" -- Nothing incriminating -- I mean only grayfaces wont like it [...]"

The title Pull My Daisy was taken from the poem "Fie My Fum" written by Kerouac, Ginsberg, and Cassady, published in the literary magazine Neurotica in 1950. The poem would subsequently be published in multiple editions under the title "Pull My Daisy." Part of the original poem was used as a lyric in Amram's jazz composition "The Crazy Daisy", sung by Anita Ellis, that opens the film.

In an interview with American Legends website, David Amram recalled of the chaotic production: "It was at Jerry Newman’s studio. I played the piano. Jack just sat down, saw the massacring of what he had written and did this phenomenal narration to make it look like what it was supposed to be. When you see Pull My Daisy, close your eyes and just listen to Jack talking. That’s the whole value of it right there. If Jack hadn’t narrated it, it would have been just another home movie."

It was filmed in Alfred Leslie's loft at Fourth Ave. & 12th St. in Manhattan.

Leslie and Frank discuss the film at length in Jack Sargeant's book Naked Lens: Beat Cinema. An illustrated transcript of the film's narration was also published in 1961 by Grove Press.

== Release ==
Pull My Daisy premiered at the 1959 San Francisco International Film Festival. It was then released theatrically by Emile de Antonio in 1960.

== Reception ==
The Hollywood Reporter wrote: "This featurette has attracted considerable notice and comment because it was made by some charter members of the Beat Generation, including the movement's high priest and prophet, Jack Kerouac and its poet laureate, Allen Ginsberg. It has been hailed in some quarters as part of the American cinema's "new wave. It isn't that, but it is – or should be – interesting to Hollywood as an authentic statement of what the Beats are up to, provided by themselves. ... The title doesn't mean anything. There is no story in Kerouac's screenplay, which the novelist himself narrates. It is concerned mostly with some loony humor, often quite funny, as a trio of Beats, including Ginsberg, confront representatives of the regular – or square – world. ... Filmed in New York, the production is ragged technically, but never dull. Anita Ellis sings a title song behind the main titles, which certainly shows the boys are willing to learn."

The New Statesman called the film "poetic and funny."

== Preservation status ==
Pull My Daisy was selected for preservation in the United States National Film Registry by the Library of Congress in 1996, as being "culturally, historically, or aesthetically significant".

== See also ==
- List of American films of 1959
- List of avant-garde films of the 1950s
