= Dan O'Brien (playwright) =

American playwright, poet, essayist, librettist

- Born: 1974 (age 51–52); New York City
- Occupations: Playwright, poet, memoirist, essayist, librettist
- Spouse: Jessica St. Clair (m. 2006)
- Children: 1

Dan O’Brien (born 1974) is an American playwright, poet, memoirist, essayist, and librettist. His most prominent works have been the play The Body of an American and the poetry collection War Reporter. He was awarded a Guggenheim Fellowship for 2015–16. His play The House in Scarsdale: A Memoir for the Stage was the winner of the 2018 PEN America Award for Drama.

== Career ==
In 2024 O’Brien premiered his play Newtown at Geva Theatre Center, directed by Elizabeth Williamson. Newtown is the recipient of the 2024 Blanche and Irving Laurie Foundation Theatre Visions Fund Award.

In 2023 O’Brien published three books: Survivor’s Notebook (Acre Books), described by the New England Review as "a visceral collection of prose poems . . . [that] illuminates the traumas and triumphs of two cancer survivors to profound effect"; From Scarsdale: A Childhood (Dalkey Archive Press), praised by James Cook in the Times Literary Supplement as "sad and bleakly comic . . . a fine, evocative memoir of a suburban 1980s childhood"; and True Story: A Trilogy of plays (Dalkey Archive Press) that David Dewitt in The Arts Fuse describes as "a distinctive achievement in theater history."

O'Brien's fourth poetry collection, Our Cancers, was published by Acre Books in 2021. Stephen Wilson in the Times Literary Supplement writes: "[O’Brien] has produced an exquisite and terrible beauty in these pages." J. D. Schraffenberger in the North American Review writes: "Our Cancers tells [O’Brien’s] truth not only skillfully but masterfully, making from pain a lasting chronicle of art that traces fragmentary moments of healing over time." In 2021 O'Brien also published a collection of essays entitled A Story That Happens: On Playwriting, Childhood, & Other Traumas (Dalkey Archive Press in the United States, and CB Editions in the United Kingdom). The book was praised by Margaret Gray in the Los Angeles Times as a "masterclass in survival through art." Caridad Svich in Contemporary Theatre Review describes the book as "[a] quiet revelation." Alice Jolly in the Times Literary Supplement writes: "This is a book for our times. It reminds us that theatre is 'fractured and failing yet struggling towards the mouth’s translation of the heart’s tongue.' Like [O’Brien], we buzz with the desire for the 'chance for more life, and for that most valued of theatrical currencies―change'."

O'Brien's play The Body of an American was awarded the Edward M. Kennedy Prize for Drama, shared with Robert Schenkkan's All the Way. It premiered at Portland Center Stage in 2012 directed by Bill Rauch, and received its European premiere in an extended run at the Gate Theatre in London and Royal & Derngate in Northampton in 2014, directed by James Dacre. The play was produced off-Broadway by Primary Stages and Hartford Stage at the Cherry Lane Theatre in New York City in 2016, directed by Jo Bonney and distinguished by a "Critic's Pick" from the New York Times. The Body of an American is also winner of the Horton Foote Prize for Outstanding New American Play, L. Arnold Weissberger Award, administered by Williamstown Theatre Festival, and the PEN Center USA Award for Drama. The Body of an American was shortlisted for a 2014 Evening Standard Award for Most Promising Playwright.

O'Brien's many other plays include The Three Christs of Ypsilanti, The Cherry Sisters Revisited, The Voyage of the Carcass, The Dear Boy, The House in Hydesville, Moving Picture, Key West, Am Lit, Lamarck, The Last Supper Restoration, The Angel in the Trees, "Will You Please Shut Up?", and The Disappearance of Daniel Hand. His work has been produced by Second Stage Theatre, Ensemble Studio Theatre, The Humana Festival of New American Plays at Actors Theatre of Louisville, Williamstown Theatre Festival, Boston Court Pasadena Theatre Company, Geva Theatre Center, Page 73 Productions, The Production Company, SoHo Playhouse, and elsewhere. He has served as a Hodder Fellow at Princeton University, the Djerassi Fellow in Playwriting at the University of Wisconsin in Madison, and as the Tennessee Williams Fellow in Playwriting at Sewanee: The University of the South. He has frequently served on the playwriting faculty at the Sewanee Writers' Conference. His work has been developed at the National Playwrights Conference at the Eugene O'Neill Theatre Center, The New Harmony Project, and elsewhere. He is the recipient of a Rockefeller Foundation Bellagio Center Residency. In 1996-97 O'Brien received a Thomas J. Watson Fellowship for travel and independent study in Ireland and the U.K. Previous awards include the American Theatre Critics Association's M. Elizabeth Osborn Award for Best New Play by an Emerging Playwright.

O'Brien's debut poetry collection entitled War Reporter was published in 2013 by Hanging Loose Press in Brooklyn and CB Editions in London, edited by Charles Boyle. War Reporter received the 2013 Fenton Aldeburgh First Collection Prize, and was shortlisted for the 2013 Forward Prize for Best First Collection. O'Brien's second collection of poetry, Scarsdale, was published in 2014 by CB Editions in London and in 2015 by Measure Press in the US. O'Brien was writer-in-residence at the James Merrill House in Stonington, Connecticut. New Life, O'Brien's third poetry collection, was published in 2016 by CB Editions in London and in 2017 by Hanging Loose Press in the US. Barbara Berman writes of New Life in The Rumpus that "an original voice speaks, on a plane with earlier masters." In 2014 O'Brien was the recipient of the Troubadour International Poetry Prize.

Patrick McGuiness writes in The Guardian that War Reporter is "a masterpiece of truthfulness and feeling, and a completely sui generis addition not just to writing about war but to contemporary poetry." War Reporter was a staff pick for best books of 2013 at Slate.com, where William J. Dobson hails it as an "incredible achievement. Anyone who cares about how we go to war—and how we return—must read it."

O'Brien was a 2015-16 Guggenheim Fellow.

O'Brien wrote the libretti for two one-act operas by composer Jonathan Berger. Theotokia and The War Reporter, titled jointly as Visitations, was commissioned by Stanford Live, the National Endowment for the Arts, and the Mellon Foundation, and premiered at the Bing Concert Hall at Stanford University in April 2013, directed by Rinde Eckert and performed by New York Polyphony and Mellissa Hughes. This production of Visitations received a New York City premiere at the 2014 Prototype Festival.

O'Brien's plays and poetry and prose have appeared internationally in newspapers, magazines, and literary journals including the New York Times, Washington Post, Esquire, Paris Review, Times Literary Supplement, The American Scholar, Los Angeles Review of Books, Literary Hub, American Theatre Magazine, The Southern Review, Sewanee Review, New England Review, Hopkins Review, Sunday Times, Yale Review, Southwest Review, Missouri Review, 32 poems, Poetry Review, Poetry Ireland Review, The White Review, ZYZZYVA, Malahat Review, StoryQuarterly, Alaska Quarterly Review, Greensboro Review, and many others.

== Personal life ==
Originally from Scarsdale, New York, O'Brien currently lives in Los Angeles with his wife, actress, writer, comedian, and producer Jessica St. Clair. Their daughter, Isobel Kelly O'Brien, was born on October 1, 2013. He is a summa cum laude graduate of Middlebury College, and received a master's degree in Creative Writing from Brown University, graduating with high honors.
