= Lila Rose Kaplan =

American playwright

Lila Rose Kaplan (born July 1, 1980 in New York, NY) is a 21st-century American playwright. She currently lives in Somerville, MA, where she was a Huntington Playwriting Fellow with the Huntington Theatre Company (2012-2014) as well as a Next Voices Playwriting Fellow with New Repertory Theatre (2015-2016).

Kaplan's plays, which include comedies, dramas, and musicals for young people, "shine light on the stories we don't tell about women... the heroines we don't often see on stage."

== Background ==
Lila Rose Kaplan received her BA with Honors from Brown University in 2002. She earned her MFA in Playwriting from UC San Diego. Her hometown is Mamaroneck, New York, and she has lived and worked in Santa Barbara, Los Angeles, and New York.

== Theatrical credits ==
Kaplan cites Merrimack Repertory Theatre in Lowell, MA as her artistic home; she received their Artistic Achievement Award in 2017. MRT produced her political comedy Home of the Brave in 2012 and her play The Villains' Supper Club in 2018.

Kaplan's drama We All Fall Down received a staged reading through the Huntington Theatre Company's Breaking Ground Festival in 2018.

Kaplan was one of the four playwrights of The Weird, Off the Grid Theatre's commissioned piece inspired by the "intersection of witchcraft and American politics," which premiered at the Boston Center for the Arts in 2017.

Her play Jesus Girls, which examines the intersection of sexuality and faith at a Christian college, was developed in part through the New Repertory Theater Next Voices Fellowship in 2015–2016.

Her musical The Light Princess, produced at the New Victory Theater by the A.R.T. Institute at Harvard, was a New York Times Critics' Pick in 2015.

Kaplan was a Writing Fellow at Playwrights' Realm in 2013–2014; she was selected to develop her play 1,2,3, which premiered at the San Francisco Playhouse's Sandbox Series in 2015.

Kaplan's play Bureau of Missing Persons premiered at Fourth Street Theater in 2013, directed by Sarah Rasmussen.

Her play Entangled, developed in part in her capacity as writer in residence at UCSB's Kavli Institute for Theoretical Physics (KITP), premiered through director Risa Brainin's Launch Pad series at UCSB’s Hatlen Theater in 2012.

Her play Biography of a Constellation won the 2010 National Science Playwriting Award from the Kennedy Center. It explores the myth and life of Annie Jump Cannon, one of the Harvard Computers who developed the system of classifying stars into the spectral classes O, B, A, F, G, K, M.

Kaplan's play Wildflower, about a woman and her troubled son escaping their past in Crested Butte, botany, and sexual awakening was developed at PlayPenn Conference in 2008 directed by Sarah Rasmussen and premiered at Second Stage Theater in New York City in 2009 directed by Giovanna Sardelli. It is published by Dramatists Play Service.

Her three short works, Duet, Panda Porn, and Amy & The Unicorn were part of the Camden Fringe Festival in London in 2010. In the same year, her one act about the onset of marriage, The Chapel Play, was part of the Chalk Repertory Theater Flash Festival in Los Angeles.

Her exploration of the changing relationship between two sisters, Catching Flight, debuted at the Manhattan Repertory Theatre in 2006 directed by Rosalie Purvis.

Kaplan has extensive additional credits. Her musicals for young people include: The Pirate Princess, and The Magic Fish. Productions include: A.R.T., South Coast Rep, New Victory Theatre, Second Stage, Neighborhood Productions, Know Theatre, and Perishable Theatre. Development includes: Arena Stage, Ensemble Studio Theatre, Center Theatre Group, Theatreworks, PlayPenn, and The Lark. Awards: The International Women's Playwriting Award. Fellowships include: Old Vic/New Voices Exchange and the Shank Fellowship. Residencies include: Harvard Business School.
