= Jonathan Berger =

American composer

- Born: 1954 (age 71–72); New York, United States
- Occupations: Composer, Professor
- Employer: Stanford University
- Known for: Contemporary classical music, electro-acoustic composition
- Notable work: Visitations, My Lai, The Ritual of Breath is the Rite to Resist
- Title: Denning Family Provostial Professor in Music
- Awards: Guggenheim Fellowship, Rome Prize (2016)

Jonathan Berger (born 1954) is an American composer. His works include opera, orchestral, chamber, vocal, choral and electro-acoustic music. He has been commissioned by major ensembles including the Kronos Quartet, the St. Lawrence String Quartet, Chamber Music Society of Lincoln Center, and the Scharoun Ensemble of the Berlin Philharmonic. Commissions include the National Endowment for the Arts, Spoleto Festival USA, Harris Theatre, the Bourges Festival, Westdeutscher Rundfunk, Chamber Music America, among others.

In addition to composition Berger is an active researcher with publications in a wide range of fields relating to music, science and technology. Berger lives in California where he is the Denning Family Provostial Professor in Music at Stanford University.

Berger was born in New York. He is a Guggenheim Fellow and a 2016 recipient of the Rome Prize.

Berger's operas, Visitations, with libretti by playwright and poet Dan O'Brien, premiered in New York in 2014 and has received subsequent performances in Rome and Boston. His chamber opera, My Lai was performed at the 2017 NextWave Festival in New York, by Rinde Eckert, Van Anh Vo, and the Kronos Quartet and subsequently toured in Asia and the United States. The work was recorded for Smithsonian/Folkways.

Berger's opera, The Ritual of Breath is the Rite to Resist, with libretto by poet Vievee Francis is a reaction to the murder of Eric Garner. The Ritual of Breath was performed at Lincoln Center as part of the New York Summer in the City Festival.

His works can be heard on the Smithsonian/Folkways, Eloquentia, Naxos, Sony Classical, Harmonia Mundi, Centaur, Neuma, CRI, and CCRMA labels.
