= Alfred Leslie =

American painter and filmmaker (1927–2023)

- Born: October 29, 1927; New York City, U.S.
- Died: January 27, 2023 (aged 95); New York City, U.S.
- Known for: Painting, drawing, cinema
- Movement: Abstract expressionism; New Realism

Alfred Leslie (October 29, 1927 – January 27, 2023) was an American painter and filmmaker. He first achieved success as an Abstract Expressionist painter, but changed course in the early 1960s and became a painter of realistic figurative paintings.

== Biography ==
Alfred Leslie was born in New York City. After service in the U.S. Coast Guard at the end of World War II, Leslie studied art at New York University, the Art Students League, and Pratt Institute. A bodybuilder and hand-balancer, Leslie posed for artist Reginald Marsh and others and modeled for classes at the Art Students League and Pratt Institute. Anticipating the Situationist International's detournement, his 1949 film Magic Thinking combined black-and-white cartoons, home movies, GI training films, industrial commercials, strip footage, and old feature films. To raise the $250 required by Tibor de Nagy Gallery to exhibit there in 1952, he appeared on Strike It Rich, an early reality television program, and won. His 1952 exhibition included The Bed-Sheet Painting, a 12 by 16 foot, black painting with a scumbled surface and white bar mounted on unstretched canvas. In the 1950s, he made sculptures using seemingly insignificant materials such as plumber's tape, stapes, grommets, nails, and housepaint. Anticipating John Chamberlain's sculptures made from recycled cars, Leslie tied together car mufflers and tailpipes with rope after hammering and reassembling them. In 1955, a collector gave him a Polaroid camera, enabling him to take hundreds of police-style mugshots, of which only photos of Sam Francis and Al Held survived.

Invited to partake in the Moderna Museet's "Art in Motion" (1961) exhibition, curated by Pontus Hulten, Leslie proposed Jolly, a kit with the ingredients to make an inflatable sculpture. Anticipating Andy Warhol's Clouds (1966), he proposed that a massive weather balloon suspend a brick over an inflated wading pool. In 1962, having gained recognition as a second generation Abstract Expressionist painter, Leslie abruptly changed course. His new works were realistic figurative paintings in grisaille, of which he later said, "there was a point at which I realized that if my work was to develop and evolve, and if I was to mature as an artist, these figurative ideas could not be ignored, even though following them could seem to imply that I would be turning my back on the twentieth century, turning my back on my abstract achievement".

On October 17, 1966, nearly all of Leslie's monochrome paintings were destroyed in a fire. Shortly afterwards, Leslie introduced color into his paintings, which have been widely exhibited. Leslie's solo exhibitions include ones at the Museum of Fine Arts, Boston (1976); Hirshhorn Museum and Sculpture Garden, Smithsonian Institution, Washington, D.C. (1976–77); Museum of Contemporary Art, Chicago (1977); Wichita Art Museum, Kansas (1984); Boca Raton Museum of Art, Florida (1989); and St. Louis Art Museum, Missouri (1991). Even though figuration and narration became contentious issues for painters in the 1980s, "these concerns didn't exist per se in film, theater, literary or still photography world, all of which I was part of."

Leslie was also known for his large scale charcoal drawings, and for his work as a photographer and filmmaker. Together with Robert Frank, Leslie directed the short film Pull My Daisy in 1959. The film, narrated by Jack Kerouac, was selected for the National Film Registry by the Library of Congress in 1996. He also created the films Directions: A Walk after the War Games (1946–49), The Last Clean Shirt with the poet Frank O'Hara (1964), The Cedar Bar (2001), Einstein's Secret (2008), and the animated film The New York Story (1963).

Leslie died from COVID-19 in Brooklyn, New York, on January 27, 2023, at the age of 95.
