= Gabriel Jason Dean =

American playwright (born 1979)

Gabriel Jason Dean at Muhlenberg College, 2024

Gabriel Jason Dean (born December 12, 1979) is an American playwright, screenwriter, and professor. Select plays include Rift., Heartland, Terminus, Qualities of Starlight, Entangled (co-written with Charly Evon Simpson), and The Transition of Doodle Pequeño. His work has been produced Off-Broadway, regionally, and internationally.

== Early life and education ==
Dean was born in 1979 and raised in Chatsworth, GA. He often writes from his own life; most notably, in Rift, a two-hander inspired by Dean's relationship with his estranged, incarcerated white supremacist brother, which chronicles the difficulties of familial reconciliation amidst opposing ideologies. Dean also pulls from family history inTerminus which, through a Southern Gothic lens, contends with the American legacy of racial violence and segregation. Dean has noted that he is primarily interested in narratives of reparation, how love and empathy play a part in theatre and, ultimately, social justice.

Dean studied Creative Writing at Oglethorpe University, where he earned his Bachelor of Arts degree in 2003. He then went on to receive a Master of Fine Arts degree focusing on Playwriting and Poetry from The University of Texas at Austin's Michener Center for Writers in 2012.

== Career ==
Dean's work has been produced and developed widely at notable theatres such as New York Theatre Workshop, Manhattan Theatre Club, McCarter Theatre, Cherry Lane Theatre, The Flea, The Kennedy Center, Traverse Theatre, 59E59, Geva Theatre Center, PlayPenn, Interact Theatre, among others.

From 2014 to 2015, Dean was a Hodder Fellow at Princeton University, and received the Dramatist's Guild Fellowship in 2013. Dean is an alum of The Civilians R&D Group, an Affiliated Writer at The Playwrights' Center, and is currently an Assistant Professor of English Literatures and Writing & Theatre at Muhlenberg College where he teaches Playwriting, Screenwriting, and Dramaturgy.

== Productions & Awards ==
| Play Title | Notable Production(s) | Awards |
|---|---|---|
| Rift (also known as Rift, or White Lies) | International: Traverse Theatre(2025) U.S. Regional: National New Play Network Rolling World Premiere (2024/25) | The Scotsman Fringe First Award(2025); Barrymore Award for Outstanding Overall Production of a Play (nominee) (2025); The Philadelphia Award for Social Insight (nominee) (2025); Shortlisted for the Uprise Award (2025) |
| Heartland | Off-Broadway: 59E59 (2022) U.S. Regional: National New Play Network Rolling World Premiere (2018/19) | Austin Critics' Table David Mark Cohen New Play Award (2019); PlayPenn (2016) |
| Terminus | Off-Off Broadway: New York Theatre Workshop, Next Door Series starring Tony Award and Obie Award Winner Deirdre O'Connell (2018) | PlayPenn (2013); Austin Critics' Table Award for Best Production (Drama) (2016); B. Iden Payne Awards for Outstanding Drama Production and Script (2016); Longlisted for the University of Edinburgh James Tait Black Prize for Drama (2017) |
| Qualities of Starlight | U.S. Regional: Theatre [502] (2016); The Vortex (2013); Source Festival (2012), Essential Theatre (2010) | Broadway Blacklist (2016); B. Iden Payne Awards for Outstanding Comedy and Original Script (2013); Essential Theatre New Play Award (2010) |
| The Transition of Doodle Pequeño | International: Club de Teatro (2024) U.S. Regional: Teatro Vision (2019); Hangar Theatre (2018) University: Northwestern University (2014) | Oficio Critico Best Play for Young Audiences Award (2024); Kennedy Center New Visions / New Voices Conference, (2012); American Alliance for Theatre & Education Distinguished Play Award (2013); New England Theatre Conference Aurand Harris Award (2011) |
| In Bloom | | Risk Theatre Modern Tragedy Prize (2019) |
| Entangled (co-written with Charly Evon Simpson) | Off-Off Broadway: Gural Theatre(2019) | New York Innovative Theatre Outstanding Original Full-Length Script (nomination) (2019) |
| Our New Town (co-written with Jessie Dean with music by David Dabbon) | University: Northwestern University (2020); Wagner College(2019) | The Civilians R&D Group |
| Pigskin | Off-Off Broadway: Theatre Row starring Will Brittain (2010) U.S. Regional: Milwaukee Repertory (2017) | Samuel French OOB Festival Winner |
