= Monkey Dance =

2004 documentary film by Julie Mallozzi

- Directed by: Julie Mallozzi
- Release date: 2004

Monkey Dance is a 2004 documentary film by Julie Mallozzi, a filmmaker based in Boston. The film follows three Cambodian-American teens growing up in Lowell, Massachusetts, as they face the challenges of urban America, learn from traditional culture and dance, and reflect on the sacrifices of their parents, survivors of the Khmer Rouge.

The Angkor Dance Troupe in Lowell, and other artists of traditional Cambodian folkloric dance, play centrally in the film as a unifying peaceful, historical, and creative activity for the youngsters and community.

Monkey Dance premiered on public television in May 2005 and has shown at numerous festivals, schools, museums, and youth organizations.

== Filmmaker's viewpoint ==
Julie Mallozzi said of the film:

I work to capture an authentic voice in my films. I really wanted to portray what it feels like to be a teenager – not just a first-generation immigrant teenager, but any teenager. That's why I also gave the three teens each a small video camera, so they could record their own lives. My intention was to make a film about growing up in America and how tough it can be to make the right choices – and how this dance troupe was lending a hand.

I started out filming a lot with the dance troupe – rehearsals, performance tours, team-building workshops. Then, I started to focus on three older kids in the troupe – Linda, Sochenda and Sam – and got interested in the rest of their lives as well. I filmed for nearly four years, and as time passed, my relationship with the kids changed. I became a parent myself, and I gradually became more interested in interviewing the kids' parents. I got a translator and we sat down and started talking about the long hours they worked in the nearby electronics factories; about their struggles as parents of American teenagers; and finally, about their experiences under the Khmer Rouge.

I was just blown away. These kids' parents had survived genocide – suffered through torture and murder and starvation. Then finally the U.S. accepted them and they came to this place where they had nothing. America wasn't where they wanted to be, but all the parents told me – every one of them – that they came because they hoped to give a better life to their children. I realized that this was what was at stake for Linda, Sam, and Sochenda. What made them different was what their parents had been through to give them this life.

When I finally began editing all this material, I found myself asking: What are Linda, Sam, and Sochenda going to do with these opportunities for which their parents had sacrificed so much? Are they going to squander them the way their older siblings had, or are they going to be different? In the end, that's the heart of the story in "Monkey Dance": not just their lives as teens, right now, but what will become of their future and their parents' hopes for them?

This project got closer and closer to my heart as I got further along in the process. I shot most of the film myself as a one-person crew – riding along in speedy cars, waiting around in supermarket parking lots after hours, eating delicious homemade Cambodian food with the families. I think we related partly because of my own Asian background – though I'm such a mix myself that I'm not sure what they saw of that.

...In Linda, Sam, and Sochenda, I saw an amazing mix of traditional Cambodian culture, White mainstream culture, and Black hip-hop culture. Their spirited synchronization of these elements is part of what enabled these three to overcome difficult childhoods to become strong, successful adults."
