= A Perfect Couple (play) =

2008 play by Brooke Berman

- Off-Broadway promotional poster
- Written by: Brooke Berman
- Characters: Amy; Emma; Josh; Isaac
- Original language: English
- Subject: Marriage, friendship, aging and adulthood
- Genre: Dark comedy
- Setting: A country house in upstate New York

Premiere
- Date premiered: June 9, 2008
- Place premiered: Daryl Roth Theatre, New York City

A Perfect Couple is a play by Brooke Berman. Originally premiering Off-Broadway at the Daryl Roth Theatre in New York City, on June 9, 2008. Directed by Maria Mileaf, the production featured Dana Eskelson, Annie McNamara, Elan Moss-Bachrach, and James Waterston.

Originally commissioned by Arielle Tepper Productions, A Perfect Couple was developed by the Royal National Theatre, MCC Theater, Naked Angels, and New Dramatists. The play was subsequently licensed/published by Broadway Play Publishing.

== Characters ==
- Amy
- Emma
- Josh
- Isaac

== Plot ==
A Perfect Couple follows longtime partners Amy and Isaac, who, after fifteen years of an on-and-off relationship, have decided to marry. The summer before their wedding, the pair heads to their country home upstate for the weekend, accompanied by their longtime best friend, Emma. Despite nearing 40, Emma is content being single and carefree. The trio is joined by the younger neighbor Josh. Over the course of the weekend, the group's seemingly stable relationships being to fracture as conversations and marriage and fulfillment reveal underlying tensions.

As the characters drink, reminisce, and confront their shared memories, long suppressed desires and insecurities emerge. The idea of Amy and Isaac as “the perfect couple” is steadily undermined, while Emma is simultaneously forced to reassess her own commitment issues. Josh, a recent college graduate with a Psychology degree, mostly observes while occasionally interjecting. By the end of the weekend, revelations and shifting loyalties leave each character questioning what exactly they desire for their forties.

== Development history ==
Originally commissioned by Arielle Tepper Productions, the play was developed by the Royal National Theatre in London, England, as well as at MCC Theater, Naked Angels, and New Dramatists in New York City.

In an interview with PopMatters, Berman noted that while developing A Perfect Couple, her dramaturge Francine Volpe "kept insisting that I flesh out the argument of the character that I related to the least. I was too much “on the side of” the single woman — and fleshing out her married counterpart's argument enabled the character I identified with to make better points. With a more balanced argument, both characters have to work harder to be heard, and this again makes for a better play."

== Production history ==
=== Daryl Roth Theatre, Off-Broadway ===
A Perfect Couple made its World Premiere with WET Productions, running Off-Broadway at the Daryl Roth Theatre from June 9 – July 19, 2008. Directed by Maria Mileaf, the production featured Dana Eskelson, Annie McNamara, Elan Moss-Bachrach, and James Waterston. The creative team included Neil Patel (sets), Jenny Mannis (costumes), Matthew Richards (lighting), Bart Fasbender (sound), and Troy Campbell (props).

== Reception ==
A Perfect Couple received positive reviews from critics, with particular praise for Berman's script, Mileaf's direction, and the actors performances.

David Cote, in a review for Time Out New York praised the play, writing

"Armed with her customary flair for brainy-yet-heartfelt banter and an anthropologist’s eye for social mechanics, Berman raises several rich themes — loneliness, sexless infidelity, Gen Xers versus Gen Yers, gender roles and the awful mutability of love."

Trade publication TheaterMania was equally effusive, noting "Director Maria Mileaf mines the various tones of Berman’s writing and elicits a host of intricately detailed performances from the main trio. Eskelman’s Amy is a terrific portrait of a control freak, who has a far richer emotional life than one might expect. McNamara imbues Emma with combination of quirkiness, vulnerability and intelligence that both amuses and touches. And as the unflappable Isaac, Waterston’s performance gracefully deepens in intensity as the weekend progresses."

Marilyn Stasio of Variety also offered positive sentiments, observing "Berman delivers an arresting premise: a long-term, three-way friendship is about to change forever. Amy (Dana Eskelson) is going to marry Isaac (James Waterston) and settle down to raise a family in his old country house. Emma (Annie McNamara), the third member of this triangular friendship, is afraid this would be a big mistake. Berman even sets up the conflict with her characteristic wry humor."

In a more mixed review, Charles Isherwood of The New York Times noted "Set at a country house in upstate New York over a lazy weekend, “A Perfect Couple” does not have the sparkle or the distinctive characters of Ms. Berman's “Hunting and Gathering,” presented earlier in the year by Primary Stages... But Ms. Berman has a breezy, accessible voice and a vigorous interest in turning over the rocks in contemporary relationships to find out what is growing underneath."
