= Kitchen Theatre Company =

Non-profit theater company in Ithaca, New York, U.S.

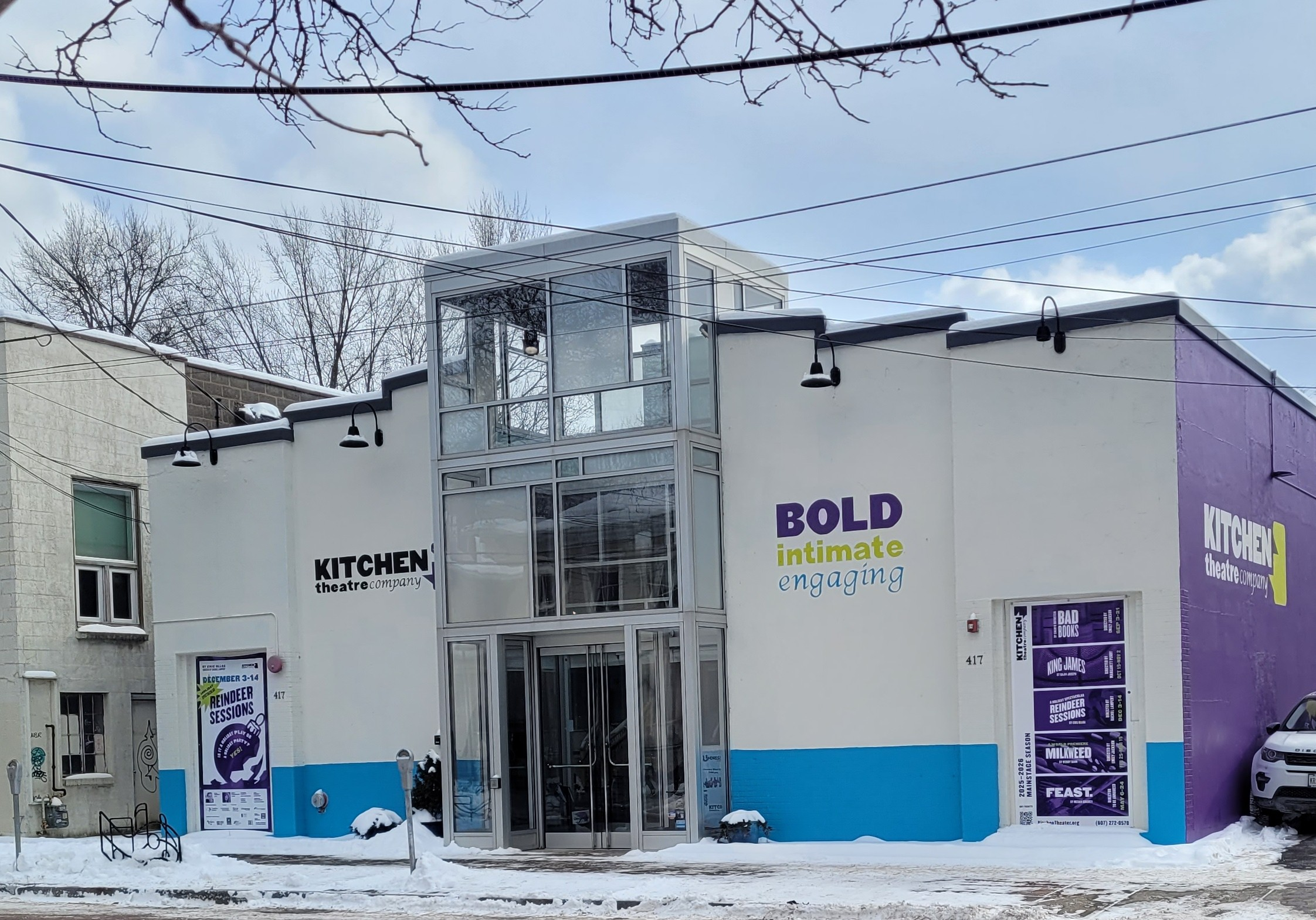
- Interactive map of Kitchen Theatre Company

Kitchen Theatre Company (KTC) is an American non-profit professional theater company in Ithaca, New York that focuses on making “bold, intimate, and engaging" theater. The Kitchen was founded in 1991 and is now in its 27th season. KTC is a member of the Theatre Communications Group and operates under a Small Professional Theater contract with the Actors’ Equity Association.

== History ==
Kitchen Theatre Company was created in 1991.

KTC resided at the Clinton House from 1995 to 2009. In 2010, Kitchen Theatre Company (KTC) moved to 417 W. Martin Luther King, Jr. Street, making history by becoming the first theater company in Ithaca to own its own location. They raised $1.2M to construct a LEED-certified green building that includes a 99-seat thrust stage space, dressing rooms, green room, scene shop, inner lobby, outer lobby/art gallery, hospitality bar, box office, and a glass entranceway called "the beacon".

Artistic Director Emerita Rachel Lampert led the company from 1997 to 2017.

Lampert retired at the end of the 2016-2017 season, and M. Bevin O’Gara took the helm as the company’s new Producing Artistic Director. O’Gara came to the Kitchen from Boston, where she was Associate Producer at the Huntington Theatre and directed productions throughout the Boston area.

== Productions ==
2017-2018 Season	
Title	Playwright
Smart People	Lydia R. Diamond
Brahman/i	Aditi Brennan Kapil
Every Brilliant Thing	Duncan Macmillan with Jonny Donahoe
Ironbound	Martyna Majok
Bright Half Life	Tanya Barfield
Brawler	Walt McGough
Matt & Ben	Mindy Kaling and Brenda Withers

2016-2017 Season	
Title	Playwright
Hand to God	Robert Askins
Precious Nonsense	Rachel Lampert
Death Boogie	Darian Dauchan
Birds of East Africa	Wendy Dann
Sex With Strangers	Laura Eason
Throw Pitchfork	Alexander Thomas
Clean Alternatives	Brian Dykstra

2015-2016 Season	
Title	Playwright
Buyer & Cellar	Jonathan Tolins
The Mountaintop	Katori Hall
I and You	Lauren Gunderson
The Soup Comes Last	Rachel Lampert
Peter and the Starcatcher	Rick Elice
Dancing Lessons	Mark St. Germain
Grand Concourse	Heidi Schreck

2014-2015 Season	
Title	Playwright
The House	Brian Parks
Lonely Planet	Steven Dietz
Sunset Baby	Dominique Morisseau
Count Me In	Rachel Lampert
A Body of Water	Lee Blessing
Solo Play Festival	Lorraine Rodriguez-Reyes, Darian Dauchan, Michelle Courtney Berry & Ryan Hope Travis
Swimming in the Shallows	Adam Bock
Thin Walls	Alice Eve Cohen

2013-2014 Season	
Title	Playwright
Heroes	Gérald Sibleyras, translated by Tom Stoppard
From White Plains	Michael Pearlman in collaboration with Craig Wesley Divino, Karl Gregory, Jimmy King and Aaron Rossini
Black Pearl Sings	Frank Higgins
Venus in Fur	David Ives
Cock	Mike Bartlett
Lungs	Duncan Macmillan
Seminar	Theresa Rebeck
Slashes of Light	Judy Tate

2012-2013 Season	
Plays	Playwrights
Frankie and Johnny in the Clair de Lune	Terrence McNally
Opus	Michael Hollinger
Brian Dykstra Selling Out	Brian Dykstra
The Whipping Man	Matthew Lopez
Crooked	Catherine Trieschmann
The Motherf**ker with the Hat	Stephen Adly Guirgis
What I Thought I Knew	Alice Eve Cohen

Production highlights include:

- Rob Ackerman’s play Call Me Waldo premiered at the KTC in January 2012 and was produced later the same year in NYC by the Working Theatre.
- Kitchen Theatre Artistic Director Rachel Lampert and composer Larry Pressgrove (music director, title of show) have written five musicals together, all of which premiered at the Kitchen Theatre. Their musical The Angle of the Sun premiered at the Kitchen and was then presented at the New York Musical Theatre Festival.
- Rachel Lampert's play The Soup Comes Last premiered at the Kitchen and then moved to the 59e59th street theater. Her play Precious Nonsense premiered at the Kitchen and had its second production at Circle Bar-B Dinner Theater in Santa Barbara, California.
- Four new plays by Brian Dykstra have had their first full productions at the Kitchen Theatre Company: Brian Dykstra Selling Out (2012)The Two of You (2009), A Play on Words (2010, then played at 59E59 Street Theatres in the America’s Off Broadway Festival) and Strangerhorse (2007).
- The Drunken City by Adam Bock was commissioned by the KTC and had its world premiere in 2005.The New York City premiere was in 2008 at Playwrights Horizons.
- First productions of plays by Rachel Axler (Archaeology, 2009) and Tanya Barfield (Pecan Tan, 2005).

== Achievements ==
- 2014 Best Theatre Company (Best of Ithaca 2014).
- 2011 Best Theatre Company (Best of Ithaca 2011).
- 2008 Syracuse Live Theater Award, Best Production of the Summer Season (Souvenir by Stephen Temperley, directed by Sara Lampert Hoover).
- Since 2007, the Kitchen Theatre Company has received operating support from the Shubert Organization, a national foundation dedicated to sustaining and advancing the live performing arts in the United States.
- 2006 Best Small Business of the Year Award, Tompkins County Chamber of Commerce. The Kitchen was the first not-for-profit recipient of this award.
- 2005 Syracuse Live Theatre Award, Best Actor in a Season (Karl Gregory in Fully Committed by Becky Mode).
- 2005 Syracuse Live Theater Award, Best Actress of the Summer Season (Rachel Lampert in The Soup Comes Last).
