= Sean Daniels =

American gridiron football player (born 1991)

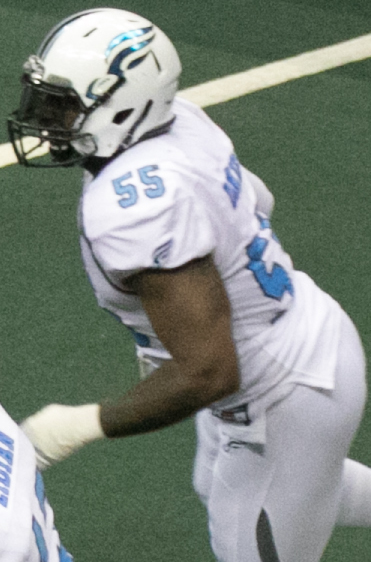
- Daniels with the Philadelphia Soul in 2017

No. 64, 55
- Position: Defensive end

Personal information
- Born: November 13, 1991 (age 34); Camden, New Jersey, U.S.
- Listed height: 6 ft 3 in (1.91 m)
- Listed weight: 265 lb (120 kg)

Career information
- High school: Highland Regional (Blackwood, New Jersey)
- College: Temple
- NFL draft: 2014: undrafted

Career history
- Harrisburg Stampede (2015)*; Iowa Barnstormers (2015); Hamilton Tiger-Cats (2015)*; Green Bay Blizzard (2016); Philadelphia Soul (2016–2017); Green Bay Blizzard (2018); Philadelphia Soul (2018–2019)
- * Offseason or practice squad member only

Awards and highlights
- 2× ArenaBowl champion (2016, 2017); First-team All-Arena (2017)

Career AFL statistics
- Tackles: 47
- Sacks: 12
- Fumble recoveries: 5
- Stats at ArenaFan.com

Sean Daniels (born November 13, 1991) is an American former professional football defensive end. He played college football for the Temple Owls. He was a member of the Harrisburg Stampede, Iowa Barnstormers, Hamilton Tiger-Cats, Green Bay Blizzard, and Philadelphia Soul.

== Early life ==
Daniels attended Highland Regional High School in Blackwood, New Jersey.

College recruiting
Name	Hometown	School	Height	Weight	Commit date
Sean Daniels; LB	Blackwood, New Jersey	Highland Regional High School	6 ft 2 in (1.88 m)	225 lb (102 kg)	Feb 2, 2010
Sean Daniels; LB	Recruit ratings: Scout: Rivals: 247Sports:				
Overall recruit ranking: Scout: 180 (DE) Rivals: -- (LB), -- (NJ)
Note: In many cases, Scout, Rivals, 247Sports, On3, and ESPN may conflict in their listings of height and weight.; In these cases, the average was taken. ESPN grades are on a 100-point scale.; Sources: "Temple Football Commitment List". Rivals.; "Temple College Football Recruiting Commits". Scout.; "Scout.com Team Recruiting Rankings". Scout.; "2010 Team Ranking". Rivals.com.

== College career ==
Daniels played for the Owls at Temple University from 2010 to 2013. He was the team's starter his final year and helped the Owls to 23 wins. He played in 30 games during his career, including one start at outside linebacker and three starts at defensive end.

== Professional career ==
Daniels signed with the Harrisburg Stampede of the Professional Indoor Football League on September 10, 2014. The team folded in December 2014.

Daniels signed with the Iowa Barnstormers of the Indoor Football League (IFL) for the 2015 season. He led the team with 6.0 sacks and was 6th on the team with 40.0 tackles.

On June 10, 2015, Daniels signed with the Hamilton Tiger-Cats of the Canadian Football League. He was released just 9 days later.

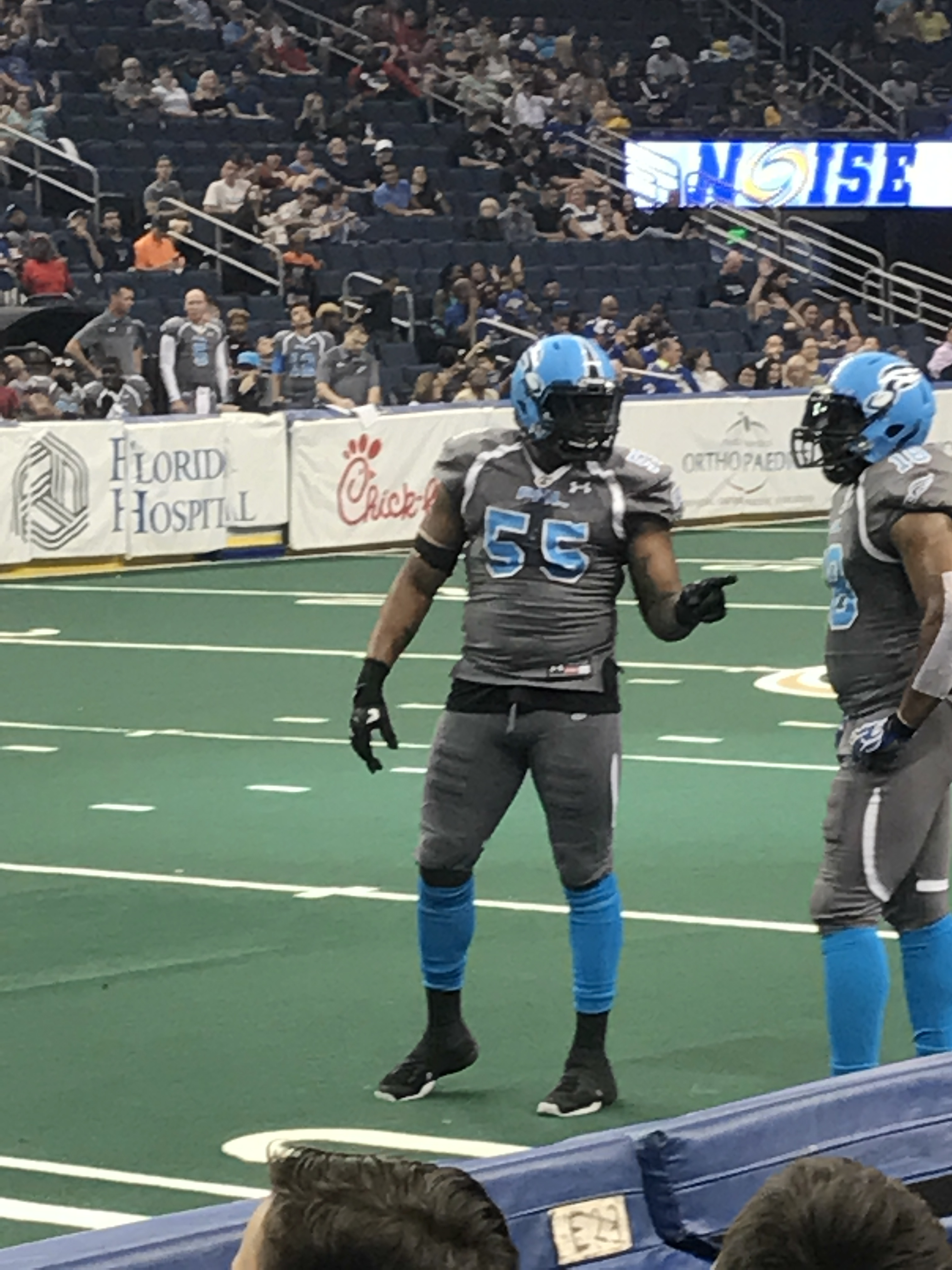
Daniels in 2017

On March 30, 2016, Daniels signed with the IFL's Green Bay Blizzard. He was released on April 13, 2016. Daniels appeared in one game with the Blizzard and record 1 tackle.

Daniels was assigned to the Philadelphia Soul of the Arena Football League (AFL) on May 10, 2016. On August 26, 2016, the Soul beat the Arizona Rattlers in ArenaBowl XXIX by a score of 56–42. On January 5, 2017, the Soul exercised their rookie option on Daniels. Daniels won AFL Defensive Player of the Week during Week 6 of the 2017 season when he recorded 3 tackles and returned a fumble for the game-winning touchdown with 33 seconds left in the game. He was named first-team All-Arena in 2017. On August 26, 2017, the Soul beat the Tampa Bay Storm in ArenaBowl XXX by a score of 44–40.

In February 2018, Daniels signed with the Blizzard.

Daniels was assigned to the Soul on March 20, 2018. On April 3, 2019, Daniels was again assigned to the Soul.

== Career statistics ==
=== AFL ===
Year	Team										
Year	Team	Tkl	Ast	Sck	PB	FF	FR	Blk	Int	Yds	TD
2016	Philadelphia	2	8	0.5	1	1	1	1	1	9	1
2017	Philadelphia	21	10	8.5	1	3	3	0	0	0	0
2019	Philadelphia	12	6	3.0	1	0	1	1	0	0	0
Career		35	24	12.0	3	4	5	2	1	9	1

=== College ===
Year	Team	Tackles						Interceptions				
Year	Team	Solo	Ast	Total	Loss	Sacks	FF	Int	Yards	Avg	TD	PD
2010	Temple	8	2	10	4.0	4.0	0	0	0	--	0	1
2011	Temple	0	1	1	0.0	0.0	0	0	0	--	0	0
2012	Temple	12	5	17	3.0	3.0	0	0	0	--	0	1
2013	Temple	9	3	12	3.0	1.0	1	0	0	--	0	0
Career		29	11	40	10.0	8.0	1	0	0	0.0	0	2

== Personal life ==
Daniels is the younger brother of Mike Daniels.
