= Lucy Thurber =

American dramatist

- Born: 1970 (age 55–56); Huntington, Massachusetts
- Education: Sarah Lawrence College (BA)
- Occupations: Playwright, librettist, screenwriter, professor
- Awards: Obie Award

Lucy Thurber is an American playwright based in New York City. She is the recipient of the first Gary Bonasorte Memorial Prize for Playwriting, a Lilly Award and a 2014 Obie Award for The Hill Town Plays.

== Biography ==
She was born in rural western Massachusetts, a place that is important as a setting or reference for a number of her plays. She lived first in the town of Huntington, then in Northampton. She attended Williston Northampton School in Easthampton, Massachusetts, Hyde School in Bath, Maine, and then earned a Bachelor of Arts degree at Sarah Lawrence College.

== Playwright ==
Lucy Thurber is the author of: Where We're Born, Ashville, Killers & Other Family, Stay, Bottom of the World, Monstrosity, Scarcity, The Locus, The Insurgents, Dillingham City and other plays.

Five of her plays, while standing alone as individual works, also form a cycle known as The Hill Town Plays. Each play in the cycle considers an important moment in the life of the main character, beginning with childhood in rural Western Massachusetts, and then progressing through college, coming to terms with her sexual identity, and onto adulthood. The five plays are: Where We're Born, Ashville, Killers and Other Family, Scarcity, and Stay. In 2013 they were produced all together by David Van Asselt of Rattlestick Playwrights Theater and ran simultaneously at several theatres in the West Village in New York City. She, along with Rattlestick Playwrights Theater received a special citation from the Obie Awards in 2014 for their collaborative presentation of the works.

Thurber was the recipient of the 2000/2001 Manhattan Theatre Club playwriting fellowship. Her play, Bottom of the World, opened the 2010–2011 season at The Atlantic Theater Company, and was produced by WET in the winter of 2005 and was previously workshopped at The Eugene O'Neill Playwrights' Center. Bottom of the World was part of The Tribeca Theater festival and received a workshop at The Public Theater. She attended New River Dramatists in North Carolina. Her play, Where We're Born, was produced at Rattlestick Theater in the fall of 2003. Killers and Other Family was produced at Rattlestick Theater in 2009, and well as 2001. Also in 2001, she was commissioned by The Keene Theater Company to write a short piece called The Kool-Aid Smile, which was presented in "Keene America."

Thurber was a guest artist at the Perseverance Theatre twice, where she helped to adapt both Moby-Dick and Desire Under the Elms. Her ten-minute play, Dinner, is published in a collection called Not So Sweet, sixteen plays from Soho Repertory Theatre's Ten-Minute Play Festival. Her play Laura and Wendy was performed at the Blue Heron Arts Center. She completed a new play commissioned by Playwrights Horizons. She received a Lilly Award in 2010. She is a member of MCC Playwrights' Coalition, Primary Stages' writing group, and 13P.

13P was an influential Obie-winning playwrights' collective, which was founded in 2003. 13P consisted of thirteen playwrights. It had the goal of creating a full production for each author. A tenet of the collective was the understanding that it would achieve its goal and then disband, which it did. 13P produced Thurber's play Monstrosity.

Thurber's play Scarcity was developed at the PlayPenn New Play Conference in 2006. In the fall of 2007, Scarcity was produced by Atlantic Theater Company in its Linda Gross Theater. The play starred Kristen Johnston, Jesse Eisenberg and Michael T. Weiss. Scarcity was also published in the December 2007 issue of American Theatre magazine.

The Insurgents involves the lead character, Sally, who broods, is armed with a rifle, and is visited by revolutionary characters from the past — John Brown, Harriet Tubman, Nat Turner, and Oklahoma City bomber Timothy McVeigh. It premiered in 2011 at the Contemporary American Theater Festival in Shepherdstown, West Virginia. It was commissioned by CATF with support from the National Endowment for the Arts.

Transfers is a play about two disadvantaged young men from the South Bronx, who have each been nominated for a scholarship to attend an elite university. Transfers considers education, social equality, and a system that proclaims the value of an education, while then denying an education to some. Like many of Thurber's play, Transfers mixes fiction with actual experiences. It is based on some of the author's own experiences, and those of two young men that she knew. Transfers opened April 23, 2018 in New York, an MCC Theater production at the Lucille Lortel Theatre.

== Librettist ==
Thurber has written opera librettos, including Watching, Faustine, and Falling Angel.

== Teacher ==
Thurber has taught at Columbia University, New York University, and Sarah Lawrence College. She now teaches playwriting at School of Drama (The New School)

== Plays ==
- Where We're Born
- Ashville
- Killers & Other Family
- Scarcity
- Stay
- Bottom of the World
- Monstrosity
- The Locus
- The Insurgents
- Dillingham City
- Dinner
- Innocence is a Sin
- Liberal Arts College
- Marriage
- Transfers
- Named
- Once Upon a Time in the Berkshires
- East Coast Curriculum
