= Brooke Berman =

American playwright and author

- Born: 1969 or 1970 (age 56–57); Detroit, Michigan, U.S.
- Education: Columbia University (BA); Juilliard School (GrDip)
- Occupations: playwright, author
- Spouse: Gordon Haber
- Website: Official website

Brooke Berman (born 1969/1970) is an American playwright and author. Her play Hunting and Gathering, which premiered at Primary Stages, directed by Leigh Silverman, was named one of the Ten Best of 2008 by New York magazine. Her memoir, No Place Like Home, was published by Random House in June, 2010.

== Early life and education ==
Berman was born in Detroit, Michigan, to a father who was a stockbroker and gambler and a mother who was a pianist and publicist. She was raised in Detroit and Chicago. Berman moved to New York to attend Barnard College of Columbia University, where she graduated in 1992.

She later attended the Lila Acheson Wallace American Playwrights Program at The Juilliard School, which she completed in 1999.

== Career ==
As an educator, Berman co-created the “24 With 5 Teaching Collective” at New Dramatists and spent five years as the Director of the Playwrights Unit for MCC Theater's Youth Company, a free after-school program for NYC youth.

She recently completed a seven-year residency at New Dramatists, where she served on the Board of Directors and developed countless plays. She has received support for her work from the MacDowell Colony, the Corporation of Yaddo, and New Dramatists, and commissions from Arielle Tepper Productions and Children's Theater Company in Minneapolis.

== Reception ==
Her short play "Dancing with a Devil" was a co-winner of the Heideman Award at Actors Theater of Louisville in 1999, presented in “Life Under 30” at the Humana Festival, and nominated for an American Theater Critics Best New Play award. The play was singled out by Mel Gussow in The New York Times and called "the most chilling of the short plays" by Martin Kohn in the Detroit Free Press. It has been published in numerous anthologies. Her short play "Defusion" has been produced in numerous festivals and included in Christine Jones's "Theater for One" project.

Brooke's short film All Saints Day, directed by Will Frears, won Best Narrative Short at the Savannah Film Festival and played at the Tribeca Film Festival in 2008.

== Personal life ==
Berman is married to writer Gordon Haber.

== Plays ==
Her plays are published by Broadway Play Publishing Inc., Playscripts, Backstage Books and Smith & Kraus.

- Hunting and Gathering (Primary Stages)
- Smashing (The Play Company, The O’Neill)
- Until We Find Each Other (Steppenwolf, The O’Neill)
- The Triple Happiness (Second Stage), Sam and Lucy (SPF, Cleveland Play House)
- A Perfect Couple (WET), Out of the Water (Cape Cod Theater Project, ARS Nova), and others
- The Liddy Plays
- Out Of The Water

== Awards ==
- Berilla Kerr Award
- Helen Merrill Award
- Two Francesca Primus Awards
- Two LeCompte du Nuoy awards and a commissioning grant from the National Foundation for Jewish Culture
