= Tanya Barfield =

American playwright

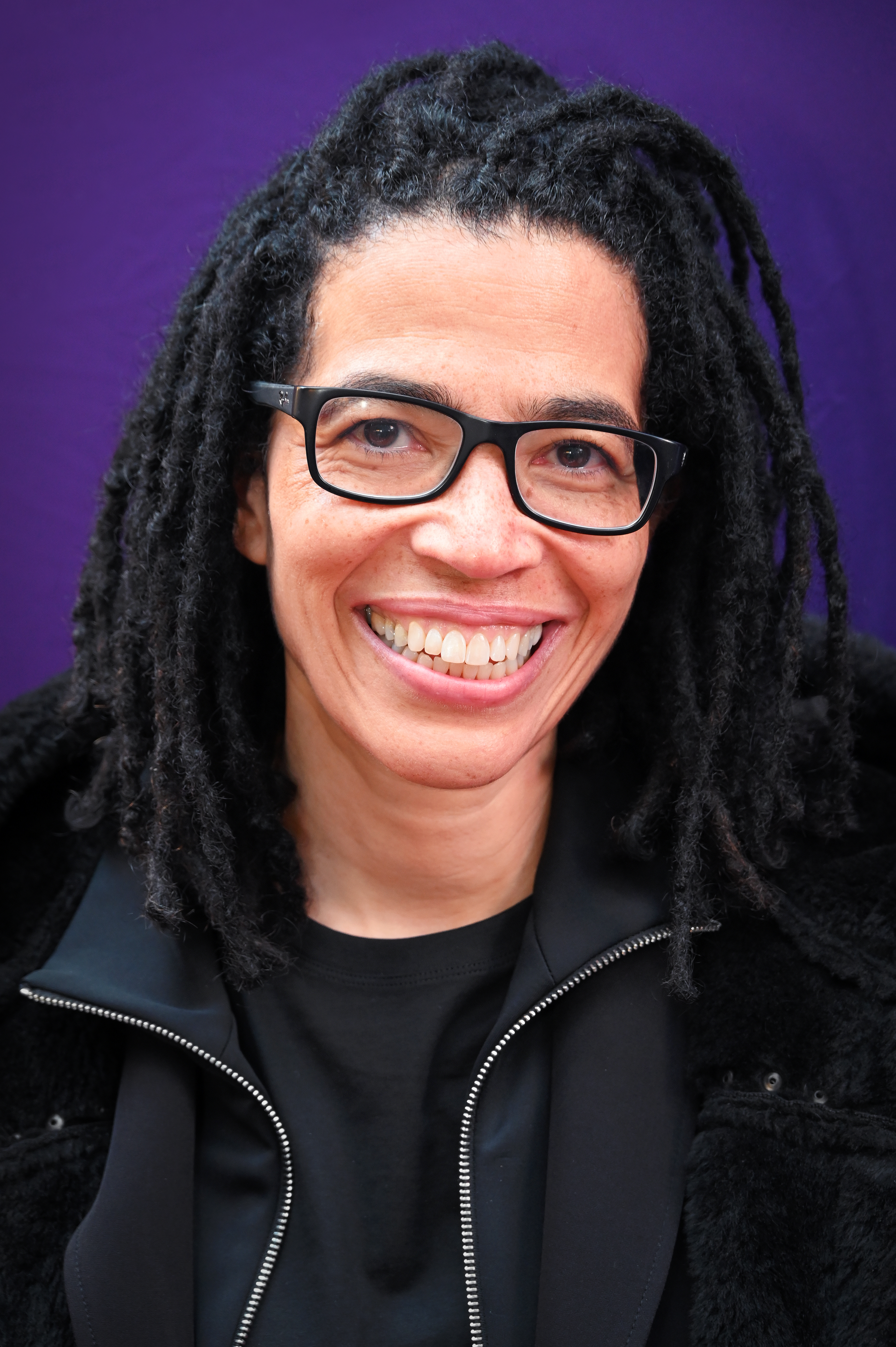
- Barfield in 2026
- Born: San Francisco, California, U.S.
- Education: New York University (BFA); Juilliard School (GrDip)
- Occupations: playwright; screenwriter; performance artist
- Writing career
- Notable work: Without Skin or Breathlessness
- Notable awards: WGA Award (2016, 2020); PEN/Laura Pels Theater Award (2020); Lambda Literary Award for Drama (2016)

Tanya Barfield is an American playwright whose works have been presented both nationally and internationally.

== Early life ==
Barfield was born in San Francisco, California and raised in Portland, Oregon, where she attended the Metropolitan Learning Center. Barfield fell in love with theater at a young age. Her high school didn't have a theater program, so she sought acting electives at another school. While she was there, the Oregon Shakespeare Festival sent actors to her school to perform a condensed version of Macbeth. She walked away from that experience knowing that she wanted to have a career in the field of theater and making the decision to direct that very same play at her own high school months later.

She graduated from New York University where she studied acting. She starred in a one- woman show Without Skin or Breathlessness. She then attended the Juilliard School Playwrights program, receiving an Artist Diploma. At Juilliard, she was the drama division's literary manager and a member of The Lila Acheson Playwriting Program.

== Career ==
Her plays include: Bright Half Life, The Call, 121° West, Blue Door, Dent, The Houdini Act, Medallion, Of Girl & Wolf and Wanting North, Pecan Tan and The Quick. She authored a book for a children's musical entitled Civil War: The First Black Regiment.

She taught playwriting at Primary Stages School of Theater and Barnard College, New York University and she served as the literary manager of the Juilliard Drama Division from 2009 to 2014. In 2016, Profile Theatre in Portland dedicated their entire season to her work, producing four of her plays. As of 2020 she replaced Marsha Norman as the co-director of The Acheson program. She is a proud alumna of New Dramatists and a member of the Dramatists Guild of America sitting on the council.

== Plays ==
Barfield's most nominated play Blue Door features a prominent African American mathematician in crisis [that] begins to lose his grip on reality, and "the ghosts of his ancestors [that] shatter the silence of an insomnia-filled night." Her play Blue Door had its world premiere at the South Coast Repertory, Costa Mesa, California in May 2006. It was then produced at the Off-Broadway Playwrights Horizons in September 2006 to October 2006, directed by Leigh Silverman. The CurtainUp reviewer noted: "Barfield's play is filled with words that spin into near poetic riffs and define the past and the present philosophical and cultural attitudes of African-Americans in a unique and refreshing way....The title refers to a family memory and a tradition stemming from the days in the slave quarters when the door was painted blue to "keep the bad spirits out and the soul family in." It also was produced at the Seattle Repertory Theatre in 2007, Berkeley Repertory and Harare International Festival of the Arts, Zimbabwe (HIFA). Blue Door was developed at the Sundance Institute Theatre Lab, Utah, in 2005.

On June 29, 2008, her play Of Equal Measure premiered at the Kirk Douglas Theatre in Culver City, California directed by Leigh Silverman through the sponsorship of the National Endowment for the Arts. The play was an NAACP Theatre Awards nominee.

The Call opened Off-Broadway at Playwrights Horizons in a co-production with Primary Stages in March 2013 to May 2013, directed by Leigh Silverman. The TheatreMania reviewer wrote that "...whatever the work's shortcomings, it's never a bad thing to leave the theater thinking about the problems of the world at large and looking at your own neighbors in a new light." The Call was a New York Times Critic's Pick.

Barfield's newest and self-proclaimed best play Bright Half Life explores the relationship between two women in love. According to press notes,

"Erica meets Vicky. Vicky marries Erica. Lives collide. Rewind. Pause. Fast forward. Bright Half Life is a kaleidoscopic new play about love, skydiving and the infinite moments that make a life together."

Bright Half Life ran Off-Broadway at the Women's Project Theater in February 2015 to March 2015, directed by Leigh Silverman. It was a "Time Out" Critic's Pick, and the script received the 2016 LAMBDA Literary Award.

== Television ==
Growing up, Barfield had little interaction with dramatic media on TV. She enjoyed television, but she never saw herself writing for the screen because it didn't have the riveting material that she wanted to explore. However, according to her,

"TV got better and better. The stories became so unexpected, with complicated characters. It started to feel like something truly exciting was happening onscreen, the vanguard of dramatic narrative. It felt rich and full of possibility in a way that it hadn't felt before."

She then began writing for television with her first writing credit being season 4, episode 7 of The Americans (FX).

Barfield is now working as a television writer as well as a playwright, yet she still struggles with finding the time to balance the two mediums. Her writing credits for television also include The Breaks (VH1), Instinct (CBS), Here and Now (HBO), Ray Donovan (Showtime), Mrs. America (FX), Raising Dion (Netflix) and Godfather of Harlem (MGM+).

== Awards and nominations ==
=== Awards ===
2020 Writers Guild of America Award for Television: Long Form – Original, for Mrs. America on FX. Barfield shares this award with six other writers.

2016 Writers Guild of America Award for Television: Dramatic Series for The Americans on FX. Barfield shares this award with six other writers.

2006 Lark Play Development / NYSCA grant

2005 Honorable Mention – Kesselring Prize for Drama

2003 Helen Merrill Award for Emerging Playwrights

2013 Lilly Award

=== Nominations ===
2020 Primetime Emmy, Outstanding Writing for a Limited Series, Movie or Dramatic Special for Episode 3 Mrs. America entitled "Shirley" on FX. 2020 Primetime Emmy, Outstanding Limited Series for Mrs. America on FX.

2007 Audelco Award for Blue Door, Playwright

Two Nominations for the Princess Grace Award.

== See also ==
- List of LGBT people from Portland, Oregon
