= Rachel Lampert =

American dramatist

Rachel Lampert is an American playwright, director and choreographer. She served as the artistic director at Kitchen Theatre Company in Ithaca, NY from August 1997 until June 2017 when she retired after a successful twenty-year tenure.

== Early life and education ==
Lampert was born in Morristown, New Jersey, but moved with her parents when she was six months old to Brooklyn, New York. She attended Brooklyn Ethical Culture School, Midwood High School '65. She did freshmen year at Mount Holyoke College and received her BFA '69 and her MFA '72 from NYU Tisch School of the Arts.

== Career ==
Lampert spent her early career as a dancer and founded a dance company in 1975, Rachel Lampert & Dancers, that toured extensively throughout the US and in Europe for fifteen years.

By 1992 she was an experienced choreographer and theatre writer. Lampert moved from Brooklyn, NY to Ithaca, NY in 1997. The same year she traveled to China to stage West Side Story.

Writing credits at Kitchen Theatre Company include: And, Lately... (2013), In the Company of Dancers (2012), Waiting for Spring book & lyrics with music by Larry Pressgrove (2011), Summers at Rock's Edge (2010), Bed No Breakfast book & lyrics with music by Larry Pressgrove (2007), Tony & the Soprano book & lyrics with music by Larry Pressgrove (2006), The Angle of the Sun book lyrics with music by Larry Pressgrove (2005), Precious Nonsense (2005) a musical with re-purposed music by Arthur Sullivan, The Book Club (2004), Waltz (2001), Lampert Variations (2000); adaptations of Frankenstein (2002) and The Trial (2004). Musicals for family audiences include: I Have a Song to Sing O!, a musical sing-a-long with new and re-purposed music and lyrics by Gilbert & Sullivan and original music by Lesley Greene, Emmett & Ella's Big Apple Escapade book & lyrics with music by Lesley Greene, Winter Tales book & lyrics with music by Lesley Greene, Physics Fair book & lyrics with music & lyrics by Lesley Greene, Fools! Schmools! book & lyrics with music by Lesley Greene and A December Suite, A Christmas Carol, and a musical version of The Odyssey Part I and Part II.

After her trip to China, Lampert wrote The Soup Comes Last, produced off-Broadway at 59E59 Theaters in Fall 2004. The Angle of the Sun (written by Lampert & Pressgrove) was selected by the New York Musical Theatre Festival to be presented in New York City in September 2007.

Lampert is a four-time recipient of NEA Choreography Fellowships and a CAP Individual Artist Grant. She received a SALT Award for Best Actress 2004 in The Soup Comes Last. Her play Precious Nonsense premiered at the Kitchen and had its second production at Circle Bar-B Dinner Theater in Santa Barbara, CA. Other directing and theatrical choreography credits include productions at Cal Rep, Arkansas Rep, Portland Stage Company, New York's Public Theatre, Mill Mountain Theatre and Hawaii Opera Theatre.

Lampert directed David Ives' Venus in Fur in 2014, and 2015 her play Count Me In was performed at Kitchen Theatre Company.
