= Edwin Sanchez (playwright) =

American playwright, novelist, and educator (born 1955)

- Born: 1955 (age 70–71)
- Education: Yale University
- Occupations: Playwright, novelist, educator

Edwin Sanchez (born 1955) is a Puerto Rican-born playwright, novelist, and educator, based in New York City for many years.

He is known for plays, including Diosa (2003), Unmerciful Good Fortune (1996), Clean (1995), and Trafficking in Broken Hearts (1993). He is also the author of the novel Diary of a Puerto Rican Demigod (2015).

A graduate of the Yale School of Drama, he teaches playwriting at Wesleyan University.

== See also ==
- List of American writers
- List of people from New York City
- List of novelists
- List of playwrights
