= Julie Mallozzi =

American film director

- Education: Harvard University (B.A., 1992); San Francisco Art Institute (M.F.A., 2010)
- Occupations: filmmaker, producer, artist, teacher
- Known for: the documentary film Monkey Dance

Julie Mallozzi is a documentary filmmaker, producer, artist and teacher based in Boston, Massachusetts. She is of Chinese and Italian-American descent and was raised in Ohio.

== Early life and education ==
She received her BA from Harvard University in 1992, majoring in Visual and Environmental Studies with a minor in English. She also received an MFA from the San Francisco Art Institute in 2010.

== Film career ==
Her first film from 1999, Once Removed, was based on her meeting her mother's family in China and how they were entangled in China's political history and affairs. Her second film, released in 2004, Monkey Dance, tells the tale of three teenage Cambodian-Americans who live in Lowell, Massachusetts, struggling to achieve success under difficult circumstances and all of whom are united under the aegis of traditional Cambodian folk dance, such as the Monkey Dance. Mallozzi's current film investigates the aging of a French-Canadian woman, originally from India, who lost her skin color and became White.

Her has also produced media for non-profit organizations to use in fundraising and outreach. Her clients include the Blue Cross and Blue Shield of Massachusetts Foundation, the Center for Health Equity and Social Justice, and the Boston Public Health Commission.

Her films have won awards at festivals around the world and have screened in museums, universities, and on public television in the United States.

In 2017, Mallozzi was the director and producer of "Circle Up" a documentary about mothers seeking justice for their murdered sons.

== Personal life ==
Mallozzi teaches film at Harvard and several other universities, serves as a freelance film editor and producer, and organizes Boston's Filmmakers Workshop salon for local area mediamakers.

== Awards ==
=== Once Removed ===
- New England Film & Video Festival 2000
  - Won BF/VF Award for Once Removed (1999)
  - Honorable Mention for Once Removed (1999)
- Association for Asian Studies - honoree
- Toronto Reel Asian International Film Festival - Audience Favourite Feature Award
- National Association of Film and Digital Media Artists - Insight Award
- Santa Fe International Film Festival - honoree
- San Francisco International Asian American Film Festival - honoree
- Wisconsin Film Festival - honoree
- Asian American International Film Festival (New York) - honoree
- Museum of Fine Arts (Boston) - honoree
- Museum of Natural History (New York) - honoree
- Northern Lights Documentary Film Festival - honoree
- San Diego Asian American Film Festival - honoree
- Asian Pacific American Film Festival (Smithsonian Institution) - honoree

=== Circle Up ===
- Rhode Island International Film Festival - Best Documentary, 2017
