= Morgan Jenness =

American dramatist (1952–2024)

Morgan Jennees
- Born: Heidemarie Schmiege; August 23, 1952; Giessen, Hesse, West Germany
- Died: November 12, 2024 (aged 72); New York City, New York, U.S.
- Occupations: Dramatist; teacher
- Years active: 1979–2024

Morgan Jenness (born Heidemarie Schmiege; August 23, 1952 – November 12, 2024) was a German-born American dramaturg based in New York City.

== Background ==
Heidemarie Schmiege was born in Giessen, West Germany, on August 23, 1952. Their (Note: Jenness used both feminine and gender-neutral pronouns. This article uses gender-neutral pronouns for consistency.) parents divorced shortly afterward, and Schmiege's mother, Anna, became a domestic worker for Fritjof and Andreina Jonassen. Fritjof's career soon took the couple to the United States, and they adopted Heidemarie after Anna reluctantly concluded that, having subsequently had another child, she could not afford to raise both. By the mid-1950s, Heidemarie lived with the Jonassens in Washington, D.C., but became estranged from the family after Andreina Jonassen's death in the following decade. Heidemarie initially enrolled at Kent State University, but later moved to New York, and began going by the name Morgan Jenness; the first name was a reference to Morgan le Fay.

== Career ==
Beginning in 1979, Jenness worked at The Public Theater, under both George C. Wolfe and Joseph Papp, in roles ranging from literary manager to director of play development to associate producer of the New York Shakespeare Festival. They were also associate artistic director at the New York Theatre Workshop, and an associate director at the Los Angeles Theater Center in charge of new projects. They have worked with the Young Playwrights Festival, the Mark Taper Forum, the Playwrights Center/Playlabs, the Bay Area Playwrights Festival, Double Image/New York Stage and Film, CSC, Victory Gardens, Hartford Stage, and Center Stage as a dramaturg, workshop director, and/or artistic consultant. They participated as a visiting artist and adjunct in playwriting programs at the University of Iowa, Brown University, Bread Loaf, Columbia, and NYU and served on the faculty at Fordham University at Lincoln Center, Pace University, and Columbia University School of The Arts where they taught theater history and adaptation.

Jenness served on peer panels for various funding institutions, including NYSCA and the National Endowment for the Arts, with whom they served as a site evaluator for almost a decade. In 1998 Jenness joined Helen Merrill Ltd., an agency representing writers, directors, composers, and designers, as creative director. They most recently worked at Abrams Artist Agency as an agent representing writers for stage and screen, directors, composers, and lyricists. In 2003, Jenness was presented with an Obie Award Special Citation for Longtime Support of Playwrights. At its 30th Anniversary Conference in New York City, the Literary Managers and Dramaturgs of the Americas presented the G. E. Lessing Award for Career Achievement to Morgan Jenness. The Lessing Award is LMDA's most prestigious award, given for lifetime achievement in the field of dramaturgy. As of 2015, Jenness was only the sixth recipient of the award in LMDA's 30-year history.

Jenness was a recipient of a prestigious 2015 Doris Duke Impact Award and worked as an activist and artistic consultant via In This Distracted Globe.

== Personal life and death ==
In later years, Jenness began using they/them pronouns alongside she/her. Jenness lived in the East Village in Manhattan, and died at home on November 12, 2024, at the age of 72.
