= Steve Cosson =

American dramatist

- Born: 1968 (age 57–58)
- Education: Dartmouth College (BA); University of California, San Diego (MFA); Fulbright Scholar, Colombia
- Occupations: Director, writer
- Known for: Founding Artistic Director of The Civilians, many collaborations with Michael Friedman
- Notable work: This Beautiful City (I Am) Nobody's Lunch; Gone Missing

Steven Cosson (born August 1968) is a writer and director specializing in the creation of new theater work inspired by real life. He is the founding Artistic Director of the New York-based investigative theater company The Civilians.

== Early life and education ==
Cosson was born in the Washington, D.C. area. He received his BA from Dartmouth College and holds an MFA in directing from the University of California San Diego, where he studied under director and Joint Stock member Les Waters.

== Career ==
Cosson led The Civilians as the first theater company in residence at the Metropolitan Museum of Art. He wrote the first major American play about climate change, The Great Immensity, which generated significant controversy from Republicans in Congress and right-wing media, and was featured as a TED Talk at the main TED conference in 2012.

Cosson collaborated repeatedly with composer Michael Friedman on works with The Civilians and other companies, until Friedman's death in 2017. Other notable accomplishments include developing and directing Anne Washburn's Mr. Burns, a Post-Electric Play, named the 4th Best American Play of the past 25 Years by The New York Times.

Credits include:

- book-writer and director of The Abominables at Children's Theatre Company (2018)
- writer and director of The Undertaking at BAM Next Wave Festival (2016), US tour, Theatre de la Ville, Paris
- director of José Rivera's Another Word for Beauty, world premiere at the Goodman Theatre (2016)
- writer/director, Rimbaud in New York at the Brooklyn Academy of Music (2016)
- director of Michael Friedman and Bess Wohl's musical Pretty Filthy (2015)
- the Off-Broadway revival of The Belle of Amherst, starring Joely Richardson (2014)

With The Civilians:

- writer/director of The Great Immensity (2014), music by Michael Friedman, created in residence with the Princeton Environmental Institute and the Princeton Atelier
- co-writer and director of This Beautiful City, which premiered in 2009 to excellent reviews at the Humana Festival of New American Plays and then completed a critically acclaimed run at the Vineyard Theatre (Drama Desk, Drama League, Lortel nominations)
- co-writer and director of Brooklyn at Eye Level, produced at Brooklyn's Lyceum Theatre in 2008
- co-writer/director of Paris Commune produced in 2004 in The Public Theater's PublicLAB series
- writer/director of the long-running hit Gone Missing which toured for several years throughout the U.S. and the U.K., culminating in 2007 in a seven-month Off-Broadway run at Barrow Street Theater (New York Times’ Top 10 of 2007 list)
- writer/director (I Am) Nobody's Lunch (2006) (Fringe First award)
- director of the company's first show Canard, Canard, Goose? (2002)

Cosson has also directed The Civilians’ work at A.R.T., Actors Theatre of Louisville, La Jolla Playhouse, HBO's Aspen Comedy Festival, The Museum of Modern Art; London's Gate Theatre, and the Soho Theatre, among many others.

As a freelance director of new plays, musicals, and classics, Cosson's other directing credits include Ethel's Documerica (BAM Next Wave Festival); Dael Orlandersmith's Stoop Stories; Spring Awakening (Olney Theatre Center); Bus Stop (Kansas City Repertory Theatre); Anne Washburn’s A Devil at Noon (Humana Festival of New American Plays); Michael Friedman's Adventures in Reality (Lincoln Center Theater), and the U.S. premiere of Attempts on Her Life; and new plays at theaters including Hartford Stage, Soho Rep, O’Neill Conference, New Harmony Project, and others.

His plays have been published by Oberon Books in the UK, Dramatists Play Service, and an anthology of his plays with The Civilians was published by Playscripts, Inc.

== Plays ==
- 2018 The Abombinables, music/lyrics by Michael Friedman
- 2016 The Undertaking
- 2016 Rimbaud in New York, various composers
- 2015 The End and the Beginning
- 2014 The Great Immensity, music/lyrics by Michael Friedman
- 2012 Paris Commune with Michael Friedman
- 2010 In The Footprint, music/lyrics by Michael Friedman
- 2009 This Beautiful City, with Jim Lewis, interviews by the company, music/lyrics by Michael Friedman
- 2006 (I Am) Nobody's Lunch, interviews by company, music/lyrics by Michael Friedman
- 2003 Gone Missing, interviews by the company, music/lyrics by Michael Friedman
- 2001 Canard, Canard, Goose? head writer, company-devised, music/lyrics by Michael Friedman
- 1998 Fingered
