= Rabbit hole =

A rabbit hole is a rabbit burrow.

Rabbit hole or Rabbit Hole may also refer to:

== Arts and entertainment ==
=== Film, television and theatre ===
- Rabbit Hole (play), a 2005 play by David Lindsay-Abaire
- Rabbit Hole (2010 film), an American adaptation of the play
- Rabbit Hole (TV series), a 2023 American spy series
- Rabbit Hole Ensemble, a theatre company in Brooklyn, New York
- "The Rabbit Hole", a 2019 episode of Batwoman

=== Other media ===
- Rabbit Hole (podcast), a 2020 New York Times podcast
- "Rabbit Hole" (song), a 2023 song by Deco*27
- "Rabbit Hole", a 2016 song by Blink-182 from California

== Other uses ==
- Rabbit hole, an unknown or disorienting thing (evoking the animal burrow in Alice's Adventures in Wonderland)
- Psychedelic experience (more specific instance of the literary reference)
- Wiki rabbit hole, the reading pattern of a person browsing Wikipedia articles through their hyperlinks
- A brand of American Whiskey owned by Pernod Ricard

== See also ==
- Down the Rabbit Hole (disambiguation)
- Rabbithole Springs, a spring in the U.S. state of Nevada
