= The Civilians =

American investigative theatre company

- Formation: January 4‚ 2002
- Type: Theatre group
- Purpose: Documentary theater
- Location: Brooklyn, NY
- Artistic director: Steve Cosson
- Website: thecivilians.org

The Civilians is an investigative theatre company in New York City founded in 2002 by Artistic Director, Steve Cosson. The plays and musicals they produce aim to "blend the real and the theatrical" by utilizing interviews, research, residencies, and community collaborations to dive into specific real-world topics.

According to Variety Magazine, The Civilians "travels far and wide researching a piece around a given subject, conducting interviews and comparing notes along the way, sometimes for years."

== Company history ==
Artistic Director Steve Cosson founded the company in 2002 with a multi-disciplinary group of artists, including some fellow University of California-San Diego graduates. Inspiration was taken from the British Joint Stock Theatre Company, Cosson having studied under director and Joint Stock member Les Waters at UCSD. Cosson has said "I wanted to create a theater that would engage with larger social, cultural, and political realities through the eyes of real, ordinary people, or 'civilians.'" In keeping with this goal, the name of the company was derived from a vaudeville term for those not within the vaudeville community.

Since its founding in 2002, The Civilians' projects have been produced at venues throughout New York City, including The Public Theater, Joe's Pub, St. Ann's Warehouse, 59E59 Theaters, and the Vineyard Theatre, and at theaters nationally, including The Center Theatre Group (at the Mark Taper Forum), Studio Theatre, A.R.T., La Jolla Playhouse, HBO's U.S. Comedy Arts Festival, and Actors Theatre of Louisville. Works by the company have also toured nationally and internationally to universities, arts presenters, and festivals.

The Civilians made its UK debut with Gone Missing in 2004 at the Gate Theatre, and (I Am) Nobody's Lunch was a Fringe First Award winner at the 2006 Edinburgh Fringe Festival, leading to a London production at the Soho Theatre. The Civilians' commercial run of Gone Missing at the Barrow Street Theatre ran for seven months and was included in several Top 10 of 2007 lists in the New York press, including critic Charles Isherwood's list in The New York Times.

In addition to its productions, The Civilians' work has been published in a number of formats. Gone Missing was published by Dramatists Play Service in 2009, following its inclusion in the publication of (I Am) Nobody's Lunch by Oberon Books in 2007. In 2009, Playscripts, Inc. published an anthology of all of the Civilians' works to date, excluding This Beautiful City, which was still running at The Vineyard Theater. Additionally, an original cast recording of Gone Missing was released by Ghostlight Records in 2008.

Founding Associate Artist Michael Friedman (1975–2017) was the composer and lyricist for Canard, Canard, Goose?, Gone Missing, [I Am] Nobody's Lunch, This Beautiful City, The Great Immensity, In the Footprint, Pretty Filthy, Mr. Burns, a Post-Electric Play, Rimbaud in New York, The Abominables, and co-author of Paris Commune.

== Structure ==
According to The Civilians' website:

The artistic foundation of The Civilians is a group of Associate Artists including directors, writers, actors, designers, choreographers, and composers. Each year, the company invites several artists to join as new Associate Artists. The company realizes its projects through a network of collaborative partnerships. Many projects are developed with the support of partners including universities, institutional theaters and artist residency programs. Projects often tour to both performing arts presenters and regional theaters.

== Works ==
=== Canard, Canard, Goose? (2002) ===
Canard, Canard, Goose? was the company's first production, premiering in 2002 at HERE Arts Center in New York City. The play was devised and created by the company, directed by Steve Cosson, with music and lyrics by Michael Friedman. The play deals with "rumors of maltreated geese during the making of Fly Away Home, the sentimental 1996 Disney motion picture that featured Anna Paquin leading geese south in an ultra-light plane." According to Time Out: New York, "The middle part of the show includes funny but affectionate impersonations of the eccentric and lonely folks who live in that remote hamlet. After two days of interviews, however, the group discovers that Fly Away Home was actually filmed in Ontario. Songs and silly dances are interspersed among the members' increasingly desperate updates on their deteriorating investigation."

=== The Ladies (2004) ===
The Ladies was written by Anne Washburn and directed by Anne Kauffman, both Associate Artists of the company. The play presents the characters of Eva Peron, Imelda Marcos, Elena Ceausescu, and Jiang Qing, as well as the artists themselves. It premiered at Dixon Place in New York City in 2004.

=== Paris Commune (2004, 2008) ===
Paris Commune tells the story of the Parisian uprising of 1871, the first socialist rebellion in Europe. The piece was developed as a part of La Jolla Playhouse's Page-to-Stage program in 2004, and further expanded in 2008 as a part of the Public Lab Series Workshop at the Public Theater. The piece is unique among The Civilians' early repertoire in that it was not developed through first-person interviews with those directly affected by the topic of the play, but rather through extensive historical research into the actual Paris Commune that had its genesis in the 1871 rebellion. The play was written by Steve Cosson and all of the music was written or adapted by Michael Friedman.

=== (I am) Nobody's Lunch (2006) ===
(I Am) Nobody's Lunch premiered at 59E59 Theaters in New York City in 2006 and received its London premiere at the Soho Theatre later that same year. An earlier draft of the piece was first performed in 2004 as PS 122 in New York City. According to Charles Isherwood of The New York Times "How and why we come to believe what we believe is the large question being explored with a wink in this collage of material culled from interviews with an odd assortment of Americans, ranging from soldiers standing vigil at Grand Central Terminal to a fellow who believes his body is inhabited by a celestial being who has useful tips on dispelling the fog of fear that has enveloped the country since 9/11." The piece received a coveted Fringe First award at the 2006 Edinburgh Fringe Festival. (I am) Nobody's Lunch was written and directed by Steve Cosson based on interviews conducted by the cast, with music and lyrics by Michael Friedman.

=== Gone Missing (2007) ===
Gone Missing premiered in 2007 at the Barrow Street Theatre in New York City. It is composed of extensive interviews by the company, all focused on the idea of loss, in many of its myriad forms. According to The New York Times review of the production, "Underneath its wry surface lies a mournful acknowledgment of the transience of life's pleasures, symbolized here by any number of cherished possessions that somehow fell into a black hole, leaving behind an aching void in the shape of a bit of jewelry, a PalmPilot or a stuffed animal. . . . Even the most mundane and functional items can be a source of strange comfort, a talisman of achievement, a thing to cling to when life gets you down," Gone Missing was written and directed by Steve Cosson based on interviews conducted by the company, with music and lyrics written by Michael Friedman, and additional text from "Interview with Dr. Palinurus" by Peter Morris.

=== Shadow of Himself (2008) ===
Shadow of Himself was written in 2008 by playwright Neal Bell. He wrote the play by commission from The Civilians, with the support of The Public Theater and The Orchard Project, collaborating with the actors and taking inspiration from interviews done by the company. The piece opened at the Access Theatre in New York City in January 2009, produced by Rabbit Hole Ensemble. The play is a retelling of the Gilgamesh Epic.

=== This Beautiful City (2008) ===
This Beautiful City first premiered the Actors Theatre of Louisville Humana Festival of New American Plays in March 2008, followed by runs at Studio Theatre in Washington, D.C. and Center Theatre Group in Los Angeles, California, and a New York premiere at the Vineyard Theatre in winter 2009. The piece engaged with "the expansion of the Evangelical movement in Colorado Springs" as well as the growing gulf between the secular and Evangelical communities. In addition to illustrating the daily interactions between the members of the community of Colorado Springs, the play also brings to the stage the fall of New Life Church founder Ted Haggard, the scandal about whom broke while the Civilians were in Colorado Springs already actively researching for the play. The piece received nominations for Drama Desk, Drama League, and Lucille Lortel Awards. This Beautiful City was written by Steve Cosson and Jim Lewis from interviews conducted by Associate Artists Emily Ackerman, Marsha Stephanie Blake, Brad Heberlee, Brandon Miller, Stephen Plunkett, and Alison Weller, with music and lyrics by Michael Friedman, and directed by Steve Cosson.

=== Brooklyn at Eye Level (2008) ===
Brooklyn at Eye Level was the first phase of a creative investigation into the heart of neighborhood, community change, and development. The project was conceived in light of the Atlantic Yards Development Project and the quickly changing landscape of Brooklyn as a unique performance of theater, dance, and music created from interviews with the real-life players in the story of Brooklyn.

Brooklyn at Eye Level was produced by The Civilians in December 2008 at the Brooklyn Lyceum. It was directed by Steven Cosson. It is the first phase of a larger exploration of urban development in Brooklyn.

=== You Better Sit Down: Tales from my Parents' Divorce (2009) ===
Crafted from interviews between the cast and their own parents, You Better Sit Down is an account of the parents' marriages and their subsequent divorces. It was directed and co-written by Anne Kauffman, with additional writing credit for Janice Paran and David Barlow as well as the actor/writers Matthew Maher, Caitlin Miller, Jennifer R. Morris, and Robbie Collier Sublett.

The show was first performed at Galapagos Art Space in December 2009. The performances were filmed by Park Pictures, and the footage has been released in short clips with interactive content through The Civilians' partnership with WNYC.

=== In The Footprint (2010) ===
In The Footprint, a play with music, is the culmination of the investigative work begun for Brooklyn at Eye Level. It was directed by Steve Cosson, with a book by Cosson and Jocelyn Clarke and music & lyrics by Michael Friedman. It premiered at the Irondale Center in Fort Greene, Brooklyn, in November 2010, to critical acclaim. It had its Boston premiere in January 2011 at Emerson College's Paramount Center.

Civilians artists gathered material about the controversial Atlantic Yards development project for several years, interviewing new and old residents, community activists, developers, politicians, and others. By using the actual words of the players involved, In The Footprint aims to show all sides of this multifaceted issue and tries to examine how the conflicts erupted, where the process went wrong, what is at the heart of Brooklyn communities, and what can be learned from all parties in these debates.

In the Footprint appeared on several best of 2010 lists, including those of The New Yorker and Charles Isherwood of the New York Times.

=== Mr. Burns, a Post-Electric Play (2012) ===
"An exploration of how the pop culture of one era might evolve into the mythology of another; "a post-apocalyptic world comforted by The Simpsons." Written by Anne Washburn, music by Michael Friedman, and directed by Steve Cosson.

=== The Great Immensity (2014) ===
The Great Immensity is a play with music that addresses the topic of the environment and the future of our planet. The play explores the themes of climate change, deforestation, and extinction in two distinct locations: Barro Colorado Island located in the Panama Canal and the city of Churchill, Manitoba in arctic Canada. Drawing on interviews with botanists, paleontologists, climatologists, indigenous community leaders, wilderness guides, and trappers, The Great Immensity gives voice to people whose stories make the reality of present crisis tangible and viscerally felt.

The Great Immensity had two work-in-progress showings at the Berlind Theatre as part of The Civilians' cross-departmental residency at Princeton University with the Princeton Environmental Institute and the Princeton Atelier at the University's Lewis Center for the Arts on April 17, 2010. The Public Theater's New Work Now! Festival included a reading of The Great Immensity on May 12, 2010.

The Great Immensity premiered at the Kansas City Repertory Theatre in 2012, and had its New York premiere in April 2014 at The Public Theater. It was reviewed by Charles Isherwood for the New York Times.

=== Pretty Filthy (2015) ===
A musical about pornography. Associate artists in Las Vegas and the San Fernando Valley talked to directors, performers, and producers about the pornographic movie industry. The "docu-musical" investigates how people got into the industry, how stars rose to fame, and how technological advancements have affected the sustainability and commercial viability of the genre.

Pretty Filthy was developed through a commission from the Center Theatre Group in Los Angeles. Bess Wohl wrote the book, Michael Friedman wrote the music and lyrics, and Steven Cosson directed. Some of the interview material was performed in cabarets at Joe's Pub in New York and the Kirk Douglas Theatre in Los Angeles.

=== Another Word for Beauty (2016) ===
A musical about a beauty pageant, but it comes, via the inmates, from inside the women's prison El Buen Pastor in Bogota, Colombia. The show premiered at the Goodman Theatre, with music and lyrics by Héctor Buitrago, book by José Rivera, and the show was directed by Cosson.

=== Rimbaud in New York (2016) ===
Arthur Rimbaud's poems brought to life through song, "interview," and myth. Written and directed by artistic director Steve Cosson, based on poems by Rimbaud, translated by John Ashbery. Music by, among others, Michael Friedman, Joseph Keckler, and Grace McLean.

=== The Undertaking (2016) ===
"The documentary troupe the Civilians presents this piece exploring mortality and the concept of the land of the dead...." Written and directed by Steve Cosson.

=== The Abominables (2017) ===
"Minnesota's first hockey musical" that also features a yeti. The Civilians' first children's production, commissioned and developed through a partnership with the Children's Theatre Company. Written and directed by Steve Cosson. Music and lyrics by Michael Friedman (who died six days before the show premiered).

=== Paul Swan is Dead and Gone (2019) ===
A tribute to gay camp icon Paul Swan, written by his great grand niece, playwright Claire Kiechel. Directed by Steve Cosson, choreography by Dan Safer, music by Avi A. Amon.

=== Russian Troll Farm (2020) ===
Russian Troll Farm was written by playwright Sarah Gancher and presented digitally during the COVID-19 lockdown. The play, which was a 2020 New York Times Critics' Pick, explores evidence of Russian state-sponsored interference in the 2016 presidential election through the eyes of five imagined employees of the real-life Internet Research Agency office building in St. Petersburg.

=== Black Feminist Video Game (2021) ===
Black Feminist Video Game is a digitally streamed interactive video game play by Darrell Alejandro Holnes that was first presented by The Civilians and Oregon Shakespeare Festival in 2021. The play incorporates live performances streamed through Zoom, live video game footage, and audience chat interactivity.

=== Whisper House (2022) ===
Whisper House is a new musical created by Duncan Sheik and Kyle Jarrow. The show received its world premiere at The Old Globe Theater in San Diego in January 2010 and its New York premiere in March 2024 at 59E59 Theaters. Set in 1942, the musical centers a lighthouse owner, her nephew, her Japanese employee, and a pair of shipwrecked ghosts who haunt them as they deal with the increasing threats of WWII.

=== What You Are Now (2022) ===
What You Are Now by Sam Chanse received its world premiere performance in a co-production between The Civilians and Ensemble Studio Theater in April 2022. The play follows the story of a young researcher investigating new methods to heal the mind from traumatic memories.

=== The Unbelieving (2022) ===
The Unbelieving by Marin Gazzaniga is based on interviews conducted for the book Caught in the Pulpit: Leaving Belief Behind by Daniel C. Dennett and Linda LaScola and received its world premiere production in November 2022. The play centers current and former members of the clergy as they grapple with the reality of losing their religion. The play was selected as a New York Times Critic's Pick.

=== Artificial Flavors (2023) ===
Artificial Flavors is a theatrical production by The Civilians that explores the intersection of artificial intelligence and human creativity. The original production premiered Off-Broadway at 59E59 Theaters in October 2023 and was hosted by Artistic Director Steve Cosson. Artificial Flavors incorporates live AI-generated content that is performed on the spot, resulting in a unique performance each night. The production concept was originally presented as a cabaret performance titled "Make Me Feel (Mighty Real)" at New York Public Radio's The Greene Space, where The Civilians were artists in residence in 2023.

== Awards and recognition ==
The Civilians has received a number of accolades for their works. The company received The OBIE Grant in 2004, The Edinburgh Fringe Festival Fringe First Award in 2006 for (I am) Nobody's Lunch, and was nominated for Drama Desk, Drama League, and Lucille Lortel awards for This Beautiful City in 2009.

The company has been reviewed positively by such publications as Time Out: New York, The Village Voice, The New York Times, and many others.

== Publications ==
- (I am) Nobody's Lunch/Gone Missing (Oberon Modern Plays, 2007) ISBN 978-1-84002-693-1
- Gone Missing: Off-Broadway Premiere Recording (Ghostlight Records, 2008)
- The Civilians: An Anthology of Six Plays (Playscripts, Inc., 2009) ISBN 978-0-9819099-0-5

== List of Associate Artists ==
- Emily Ackerman
- Ernest Adzentoivich
- Jim Augustine
- Damian Baldet
- Sarah Beers
- Neal Bell
- Quincy Bernstine
- Marsha Stephanie Blake
- Catherine Bloch
- Andy Boroson
- Ian Brennan
- Lucrecia Briceño
- Kate Buddeke
- Aysan Çelik
- Andromache Chalfant
- Jocelyn Clarke
- Matthew Dellapina
- Terence Dale
- Maria Dizzia
- Alexander Dodge
- Marcus Doshi
- Thomas Dunn
- Michael Esper
- Gibson Frazier
- Lexy Fridell
- Michael Friedman
- Jordan Harrison
- Brad Heberlee
- Daoud Heidami
- Nina Hellman
- Richard Huntley
- Daniel Jenkins
- Takeshi Kata
- Abigail Katz
- Anne Kauffman
- Karinne Keithley
- Christina Kirk
- Alix Lambert
- Jim Lewis
- Trey Lyford
- Matthew Maher
- Melanie Marnich
- Brandon Miller
- Caitlin Miller
- Jennifer R. Morris
- Josh Neufeld
- Stephen Plunkett
- Michael Premo
- Shane Rettig
- KJ Sanchez
- Jenny Schwartz
- Jeanine Serralles
- Brian Sgambati
- Jeremy Shamos
- Robert Signom III
- Robbie Sublett
- Louisa Thompson
- Kenneth Travis
- Anne Washburn
- Les Waters
- Alison Weller
- Colleen Werthmann
- Sam Wright
