= Luba Mason =

American actress and singer

- Born: Lubica Anna Gregusova (Lubitza Gregus); Astoria, Queens, New York City
- Education: New York University (BFA); Circle in the Square Theatre School
- Occupations: Actress and singer
- Years active: 1987–present
- Spouse: Rubén Blades (m. 2006)
- Website: http://www.lubamason.com

Luba Mason is an American actress, singer, songwriter and dancer. She has starred on Broadway, Off-Broadway, regional theaters in plays and musicals and television and film. As a singer, she has performed in International Jazz and Music Festivals as well as major jazz and music clubs around the country. Mason has trademarked her own musical format called Mixtura, "a blend of different musical currents."

== Early life ==
Mason was born Lubica Anna Christina Gregusova to Rudolph and Ellen Gregus a first-generation American of Slovak descent. She grew up in Palisades, NY, graduating from Tappan Zee High School in Orangeburg, NY in 1979. At Tappan Zee High School she performed in many of the Drama Department's theatrical productions, including Gypsy (in the role of Louise), Kismet, Dracula, Don't Drink the Water, Anything Goes, and Cabaret. She studied classical piano for 12 years starting at the age of 5, trained classically in voice with teachers from The Juilliard School and Manhattan School of Music, and dance with Lee Theodore and The American Dance Machine. Mason also received a BFA in Drama from the NYU Tisch School of the Arts and Circle in the Square Theatre School. After graduating from NYU, she used the name 'Kim Freshwater' professionally for a few years.

== Career ==
=== Broadway ===
Mason's extensive Broadway career began in 1987, when she made her debut, billed as 'Kim Freshwater,' as the statuesque, leather-clad nightclub owner in the short-lived musical Late Nite Comic. This was followed by her appearance in Sid Caesar & Company in 1989. In 1991, she was part of the original Broadway cast of Tommy Tune's Tony Award-winning The Will Rogers Follies, first as the second Ziegfeld Follies girl from the left, then assuming understudy assignments for the leading lady "Betty Blake" and sassy featured role of "Ziegfeld's Favorite". Next came her break-through comedic role of Hedy LaRue in the first revival of How to Succeed in Business Without Really Trying opposite Matthew Broderick and directed by Des McAnuff. Significant roles followed as the mourning mother Mrs. Kresinsky in Paul Simon's The Capeman, the doomed Lucy Harris in Jekyll & Hyde replacing Linda Eder, and later playing the hardened Velma Kelly opposite Brooke Shields' Roxy Hart in Chicago, directed by Walter Bobbie. Mason originated the role of Mrs. Burke in the musical Girl from the North Country written and directed by Conor McPherson with music and lyrics by Bob Dylan on Broadway in 2020. Other roles include Joanna in Trevor Nunn's American premiere of Sunset Boulevard with Glenn Close at the Shubert Theatre in Los Angeles in 1993. Mason can be heard on Broadway cast recordings of The Will Rogers Follies, How To Succeed in Business..., The Capeman, The Stephen Schwartz Album and Girl from the North Country.

=== Singing ===
Her experience with Latin music and artists in The Capeman led to a love of Latin rhythms and Brazilian music. Mason, blessed with "...a celestial voice" (Los Angeles Times), was a guest vocalist on Rubén Blades’ double Grammy-winning cd Mundo in 2002 with her rendition of "Danny Boy". Her first cd Collage (2004) put a Latin flavor on some familiar standards and pop ballads. Luba Mason has been called "a powerfully emotional song interpreter...a much needed dose of uniqueness in an industry where bland pigeonholing is an art form in itself." (All Music Guide) and "...a voice with a brain behind it" (Time Out New York). Exploring Brazilian music further, she collaborated with Renato Neto and wrote or co-wrote most of the songs for her cool jazz/pop/Brazilian cd Krazy Love (2009), described as "a voice as big and rich as a star filled sky," (Jazz Times). Krazy Love also featured jazz artists Jimmy Haslip and Hubert Laws, and 12 time Grammy winner/11 time Latin Grammy winner Rubén Blades. In 2009 Mason, Haslip and Laws were invited to open for Wayne Shorter, Chucho Valdez and Danilo Perez at the Panama Jazz Festival and later Mason headlined Havana Cuba's 40th International Music Festival in 2011 produced by Nederlander Worldwide Entertainment, and Costa Rica's International Music Festival. In the U.S., she has performed shows at LA's famed Catalina Bar & Grill, Yoshi's in Oakland, the Blue Note in New York City., Blues Alley in DC, World Cafe in Philadelphia and the Regattabar in Boston. She has also headlined at Vibrato and the Cinegrill in L.A., Feinstein's, Birdland, B.B. Kings, Iridium and the Metropolitan Room in N.Y. Most recently Mason and her husband Rubén Blades performed together at Radio City Music Hall in Paul Simon's sold-out benefit concert for the Children's Health Fund's 25th Anniversary and in 2014 at Jazz at Lincoln Center with Wynton Marsalis and his band. In 2016 Mason released her third solo album Mixtura, with Rafael Rosa (guitar); Sara Caswell (violin); Felipe Fournier (vibraphone, percussion); Joel Mateo (drums), using a mixtura of styles. In 2020 she released Triangle, arranged with just voice, Joe Locke on vibes and James Genus on bass. In 2016 she performed at the "2016 Bratislava Jazz Days Festival" in Slovakia. She won the 2019 BISTRO AWARD for Outstanding Vocalist.

=== Mixtura ===
Mason has trademarked the name Mixtura – "a blend of different musical currents". It is a genre blend of jazz, pop, classical and world music styles. She performs an eclectic selection of material with arrangements in a broad range of musical genres mixed in new and exciting combinations. "Surround yourself with people who are great, and who will push you, and you can challenge yourself and learn," she says.

=== Other credits ===
Mason's film and television work includes Abuse, The Ten Commandments: The Musical, Law & Order, NYPD Blue, Another World, One Life to Live, New York Undercover, Now and Again, Raines, Person of Interest, and Forever. Mason's professional career began as a singer/dancer in Lee Theodore's American Dance Machine. She was a member for five years beginning the day after graduation from NYU's Tisch School of the Arts. Lee took Luba under her wing while the company toured Japan, Europe, the U.S. and later a limited engagement at New York's City Center hosted by Dick Cavett. Mason's regional theater work includes Lucky in the Rain at the Goodspeed Playhouse, A Class Act at the Pasadena Playhouse, Pippin at the Freud Playhouse, The Ten Commandments at the Kodak Theatre, and White Noise at the Royal George Theater. She performed in the BAM concert version of The Capeman in 2008, and also the Public Theater production of the show at the Delacorte Theater in 2010. Mason received the New York Musical Theatre Festival Award for Outstanding Individual Performance for her role in the 2013 presentation of Julian Po. In 2015, Mason collaborated in the premiere of Pretty Filthy, a new musical about the "other" Hollywood, produced by the award-winning theater company The Civilians, with music by Michael Friedman (Bloody Bloody Andrew Jackson) and book by Bess Wohl. Luba received nominations for Outstanding Featured Actress in a Musical for both the Lucille Lortel Awards and the Drama Desk Awards for her role. 2015 club dates include 54 Below, the Blue Note Jazz Festival at Subrosa NYC, and Jazz at Lincoln Center's Dizzy's Club Coca-Cola. Luba originated the role of Mrs. Burke in the U.S. debut of the musical Girl from the North Country written and directed by Conor McPherson with music and lyrics by Bob Dylan at The Public Theater in 2018. Luba received a nomination for Outstanding Featured Actress in a Musical for the Lucille Lortel Awards for the role.

== Personal life ==
Mason is married to Panamanian singer/actor/politician Rubén Blades, whom she met during the production of The Capeman. She has continued to work extensively in Panama donating her time and talents coaching musical theater students, giving master classes in both voice and acting and even assisted the former First Lady of Panama Vivian Fernández de Torrijos in working with women in prison.
