= Stephen Plunkett =

American actor (born 1981)

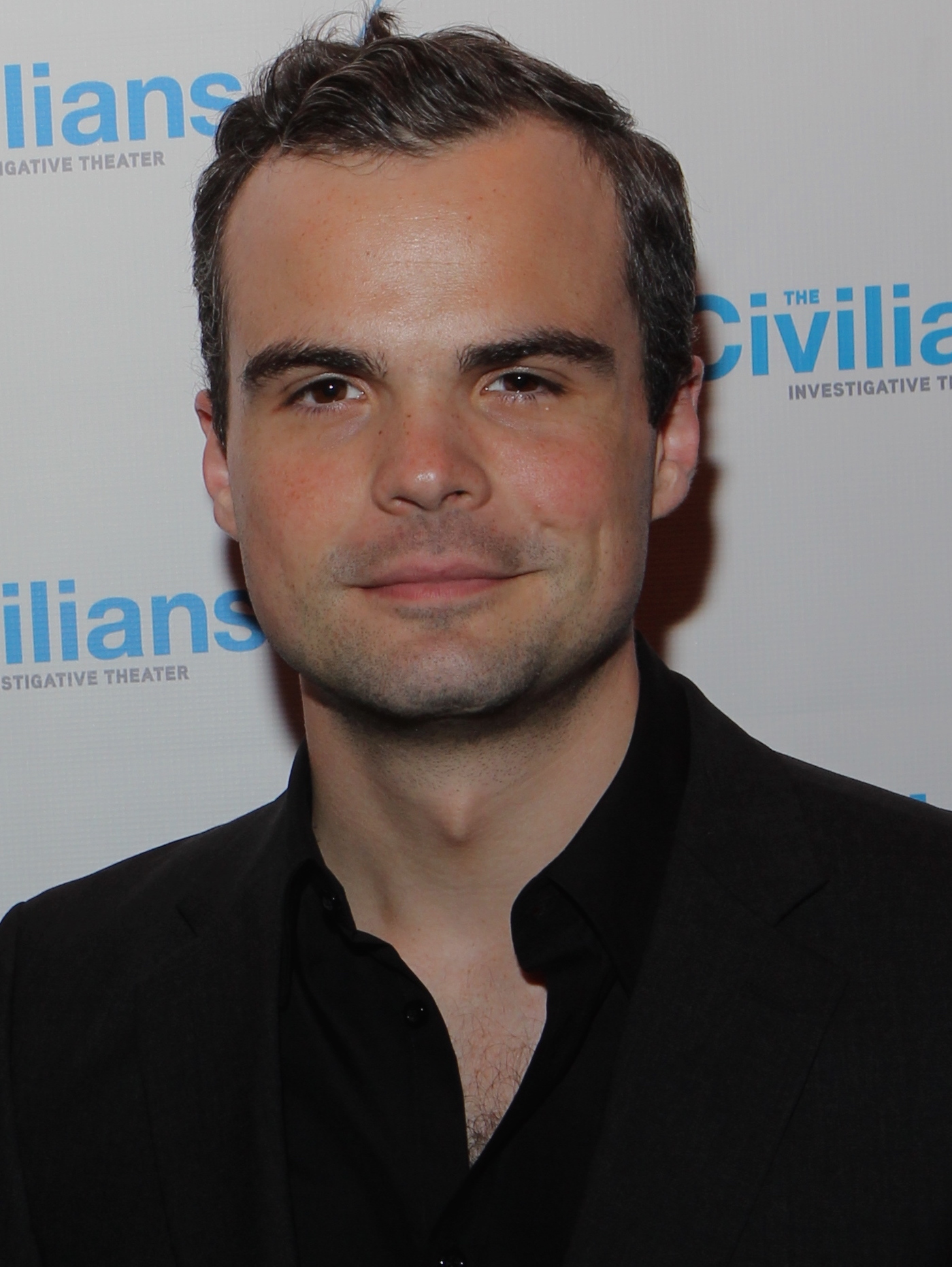
- Born: September 1, 1981 (age 44); Jacksonville, Texas, U.S.
- Education: University of Evansville (BFA); New York University (MFA)
- Occupation: Actor

Stephen Plunkett (born September 1, 1981) is an American actor. He is best known for his performances in the NBC series, Rise, and John Magary's The Mend, which premiered at the 2014 South by Southwest Film Festival.

Plunkett is also known for his performances in New York theater, which include roles in War Horse, The Orphans' Home Cycle, Gone Missing, This Beautiful City, On the Levee, London Wall, and Dada Woof Papa Hot.

== Early life ==
Plunkett was born on September 1, 1981, in Jacksonville, Texas. His father is a Presbyterian minister and his mother a special education teacher.

Plunkett attended the University of Evansville and received a Master of Fine Arts from the Tisch School of the Arts at New York University.

== Career ==
Plunkett moved to New York after graduating from college.

Plunkett is an associate artist of The Civilians.

In 2010, Plunkett was cast in Russell Harbaugh's short film Rolling on the Floor Laughing which was featured at the 2012 Sundance Film Festival.

In 2011, Plunkett made his Broadway debut in War Horse at the Vivian Beaumont Theater at Lincoln Center for the Performing Arts

In 2013, Plunkett was cast alongside Josh Lucas and Mickey Sumner in The Mend, which premiered at South By Southwest in March 2014.

In 2017, Plunkett was cast as Robert Saunders in Rise on NBC.

== Filmography ==
=== Film ===
Year	Title	Role
2011	Rolling on the Floor Laughing	Stephen
2014	The Mend	Alan
2014	Half Brother	Michael
2016	Vera	Renzo
2016	Eugenia and John	Investment Banker
2018	Back at the Staircase	Phillip
2019	Chained for Life	Max

=== Television ===
Year	Title	Role	Episodes
2008	Law & Order: Criminal Intent	Jones	1
2010	Mercy	Noah	1
2012	Elementary	Martin Rydell	1
2013	The Good Wife	Dr. Banks	1
2016	Person of Interest	Alex Duncan	1
2018	Rise	Robert Saunders	8
2018	Murphy Brown	Charles Lynn	1
2019	The Blacklist	Jonas Kruger	1
2019	Fosse/Verdon	Paul Grantner	2
2019	Bull	ADA Monroe	1
2022	FBI: International	Tomas Richter	1
2022	East New York	Det. Desmond Troy	3

== Stage Work ==
=== Broadway ===
Year	Title	Role	Theater
2011	War Horse	Lieutenant James Nicholls / Unteroffizier Klebb	Vivian Beaumont Theater

=== Off-Broadway ===
Year	Title	Role	Theater
2007	Gone Missing		Barrow Street Theatre
2009	This Beautiful City	TAG Pastor / Priest / Marcus Haggard	Vineyard Theatre
2009	The Orphans' Home Cycle Part I	Terrance Robedaux / Will Kidder	Signature Theatre Company
2009	The Orphans' Home Cycle Part II	Archie Gordon / Steve Tyler	Signature Theatre Company
2010	The Orphans' Home Cycle Part III	Will Kidder	Signature Theatre Company
2010	On the Levee	Foreman / L'Amour Mason	Duke on 42nd Street
2010	Now Circa Then	Gideon	Ars Nova
2014	London Wall	Mr. Brewer	Mint Theater
2015	Snow Orchid	Sebbie Lazarra	Lion Theater
2015	Dada Woof Papa Hot	Scott	Mitzi E. Newhouse Theatre

=== Awards ===
2010 Drama Desk Special Award
