= François Morel =

François Morel may refer to:

- François Morel (actor) (born 1959), French actor
- François Morel (composer) (1926-2018), Canadian composer
- François M. M. Morel (born 1944), French-American biogeochemist
