= Gone Missing =

Gone Missing may refer to:

- Gone Missing (musical), a 2003 musical by The Civilians
- "Gone missing", an episode of The Unit (season 3)
- "Gone Missing", a 2015 song by Shift K3Y
- Gone Missing (film), a 2013 American film starring Daphne Zuniga
