= (I Am) Nobody's Lunch =

2006 play

(I Am) Nobody's Lunch is a 2006 play with music produced by The Civilians, an investigative theater company in New York City. Based on interviews conducted in 2003, the play explores the compromised issues of trust and truth that arose between the American government and its people during the lead-up to the Iraq War. (I Am) Nobody's Lunch was written and directed by Steve Cosson from interviews by the company, with music and lyrics by Michael Friedman.

== Conception ==
(I Am) Nobody's Lunch grew from interviews with people from all over America about what they believe regarding their current government and public culture. When writing about the motivation to create such a work, writer and director Steve Cosson said

"If a democracy depends in part on there being some common understanding of what is actually taking place in the world, then we wanted to know if in fact if such a consensus existed, and if not, then just how are people parsing reality?"

== Process ==
(I Am) Nobody's Lunch is marked by The Civilians' characteristic journalistic approach to theater, in which the play's foundation is built from a series of individual interviews, usually conducted by the cast members themselves. These interviews are not recorded, and transcribed later from memory. The dialogue from the interviews is then woven verbatim into the script, producing a kind of theater that Brian Logan from The Guardian describes thus: "The Civilians co-mingle docudrama with cabaret, spinning their interviewees' responses into improbable, inquisitive song-and-soliloquy revues."

== The Play ==
(I Am) Nobody's Lunch takes on the question that was on the minds of many Americans as the Bush administration began to launch the Iraq War: Who, or what, do we believe? It presents a dynamic range of real-life perspectives from across the country, from an Arab-American cab driver to a staffer at the Department of Homeland Security, everyone in the phone book listed under the name Jessica Lynch, an elderly Jewish woman, and even an alien. According to Sam Marlowe, in his review of (I Am) Nobody's Lunch when it played at the SoHo Theater in London, the play "considers the impossibility of certainty in a world stuffed with lies." The scenes and monologues from Cosson's script are interspersed with composer Michael Friedman's musical numbers, producing a cabaret-like piece of theatre.

== Production history ==
An early version of the play opened in September 2004 and was produced by The Civilians and presented by Performance Space 122. (I Am) Nobody's Lunch had its official U.S. premiere by The Civilians at 59E59 Theaters, New York City, January 19, 2006. The play then received its London premiere by The Civilians at Soho Theatre on September 6, 2006, after playing an award-winning run at the Edinburgh Fringe Festival earlier that year. (I Am) Nobody's Lunch also toured along the East Coast during April 2006, playing shows at the Annenberg Center for the Performing Arts in Philadelphia, PA (April 19 – 23, 2006) and the American Repertory Theater in Cambridge, MA (April 25–30, 2006).

== Public response and recognition ==
(I Am) Nobody's Lunch garnered favorable reviews from such publications as The New York Times, The Boston Globe, and The Times. The play also won a coveted First Fringe award at the Edinburgh Fringe Festival in 2006 and was named as a Critic's Choice: Top Five Plays selection by The Evening Standard.

== Cast ==
U.S. premiere: Quincy Tyler Bernstine, Matt Dellapina, Brad Heberlee, Daoud Heidami, Caitlin Miller, Jennifer R. Morris, and Andy Boronson.

London premiere: Matt Dellapina, Daoud Heidami, Brandon Miller, Caitlin Miller, Lexy Fridell, and Andy Boroson on piano.
