= Mr. Burns, a Post-Electric Play =

Dark comedy play

- The poster for the original off-Broadway production at Playwrights Horizons
- Written by: Anne Washburn
- Genre: Black comedy

Premiere
- Date: May 2012
- Place: Woolly Mammoth Theatre, Washington, D.C.

Mr. Burns, a Post-Electric Play (also known as simply Mr. Burns) is an American black comedy play written by Anne Washburn, with music by Michael Friedman. The play depicts the evolution of the story from the Simpsons episode "Cape Feare" in the decades after an apocalyptic event.

It premiered in May 2012 at the Woolly Mammoth Theatre in Washington, D.C., and ran from August through October 2013 at Playwrights Horizons in New York City, commissioned and developed with the New York theater company The Civilians. It received polarized reviews and was nominated for a 2014 Drama League Award for Outstanding Production of a Broadway or Off-Broadway Play.

It was produced at the Almeida Theatre in London in 2014 by director Robert Icke, and in Adelaide and Sydney, Australia, in 2017 by director Imara Savage. The UK regional premiere was produced at Derby Theatre in 2023 by director Omar Khan.

== Plot ==
Shortly after an unspecified apocalypse, six survivors gather at a campfire. To distract themselves from mourning, they attempt to recount the plot of the Simpsons episode "Cape Feare"—itself a spoof of the 1962 film Cape Fear and its 1991 remake—as well as several other pieces of media.

Seven years later, the group has formed a travelling theatre company that specializes in performing Simpsons episodes. Live theatre is a major form of entertainment in the new society, with troupes fiercely competing to replicate pre-apocalyptic stories. Despite this goal, the group's rendition of "Cape Feare" differs from the real episode in many small ways. During a rehearsal, the group is attacked by armed robbers, with their fates unknown.

75 years after that, "Cape Feare" is performed as a musical in a theater dedicated to The Simpsons. The characters, plot and moral have changed into more serious and epic forms. For example, Mr. Burns has been combined with Sideshow Bob (the actual "Cape Feare" villain) and is now a supernatural avatar of death and destruction.

In the musical's story, Burns destroys Springfield by sabotaging the nuclear power plant. The Simpsons flee from the catastrophe onto a houseboat. Burns and his demonic henchmen Itchy and Scratchy sneak onto the boat and untie the mooring ropes, then begin killing the Simpsons one by one. Bart, the last survivor, almost surrenders out of despair. However, he receives encouragement from the ghosts of his family and duels Burns in a swordfight. Burns almost wins, but when the boat enters violent rapids, he is flung onto Bart's sword and dies. As Bart sings a finale song about hope for the future, the stage is lit up by bicycle-powered electric lights—the first appearance of electricity in the play.

== History ==
Mr. Burns, a Post-Electric Play was written by Anne Washburn with a score composed by Michael Friedman. For a long time, Washburn had been exploring what it would be like "to take a TV show and push it past the apocalypse and see what happened to it" and while she originally considered Friends, Cheers, and M*A*S*H, she ultimately settled on The Simpsons.

Working with The Civilians theater company, who had commissioned the play, Washburn held a workshop for a week in 2008 with actors Matthew Maher, Maria Dizzia, and Jennifer R. Morris to see how much of any episode of The Simpsons they could remember. Maher knew The Simpsons well and the group decided on the 1993 episode "Cape Feare", based on the 1991 film Cape Fear, itself a remake of a 1962 film of the same name which is based on the 1957 novel The Executioners. He helped Dizzia and Morris remember the episode, then the two of them went on to perform it for an audience without his help; Washburn subsequently utilized recordings of this process in writing her play's first act.

== Productions ==
=== 2012: Washington, D.C. ===
The play had its world premiere in May 2012 at Washington, D.C.'s Woolly Mammoth Theatre. It was commissioned by The Civilians and developed in partnership with them, Seattle Repertory Theatre, and Playwrights Horizons. It was directed by Steve Cosson who got confirmation from several lawyers that the play fell under the umbrella of fair use.

=== 2013: New York City ===
Cosson also directed the New York City production at Playwrights Horizons that premiered on September 15, 2013. Maher and Morris, who had not appeared in the Woolly Mammoth production, returned for the New York staging. At Playwrights, the show ran until October 20, 2013. Samuel French, Inc. published the show's script and licenses productions of the show.

=== U.S. casts ===
Character(s)	Original off-Broadway cast	Original D.C. cast
Quincy, Businesswoman, Bart 2	Quincy Tyler Bernstine	Erika Rose
Susannah, Lisa 1, Second F.B.I. Agent, Itchy	Susannah Flood	Jenna Sokolowski
Gibson, Loving Husband, Sideshow Bob, Homer 2	Gibson Frazier	Chris Genebach
Matt, Homer 1, Scratchy	Matthew Maher	Steve Rosen
Nedra, Edna Krabappel	Nedra McClyde	
Jenny, Marge	Jennifer R. Morris	Kimberly Gilbert
Colleen, First F.B.I. Agent, Lisa 2	Colleen Werthmann	Amy McWilliams
Sam, Bart 1, Mr. Burns	Sam Breslin Wright	James Sugg

=== 2014: London ===
Washburn continued to revise the play for its European premiere at the Almeida Theatre in London in Spring 2014, and a new draft was published by Oberon Books. It was directed by Robert Icke, who commissioned Orlando Gough to compose a new a cappella score for the third act. The London production was visually and emotionally darker than the New York one, especially in its third act which resembled Greek tragedy as much as The Simpsons.

It provoked an extremely divided reaction from British critics; ratings ranged from one to five stars.

Character(s)	Original London cast
Maria, Lisa	Annabel Scholey
Gibson, Itchy	Adrian der Gregorian
Matt, Homer	Demetri Goritsas
Quincy, Marge	Wunmi Mosaku
Colleen, Bart	Jenna Russell
Sam, Mr Burns	Michael Shaeffer
Nedra	Adey Grummet
Jenny, Scratchy	Justine Mitchell

=== 2017: Australia ===
A co-production between Sydney's Belvoir St Theatre and the State Theatre Company South Australia saw the play performed at Space Theatre in the Adelaide Festival Centre, Adelaide, in April–May 2017 and at the Belvoir in May–June 2017.

Mitchell Butel took the roles of Mr Burns and Gibson, while Paula Arundell, Esther Hannaford, Jude Henshall, Brent Hill, Ezra Juanta, and Jacqy Phillips making up the rest of the cast. The production was directed by Imara Savage. The play was mostly met with good reviews and Butel won a Helpmann Award for his performance.

== Reception ==
The New York Times ranked Mr. Burns: a post-electric play at #4 on its list "The Great Work Continues: The 25 Best American Plays Since Angels in America." Critic Laura Collins-Hughes wrote, "Not everyone loves this play; not everyone’s meant to. But for the rest of us, it’s the kind of bold, inventive show that sends you staggering out onto the street afterward, stunned and exhilarated, not sure quite what you’ve just experienced because you’ve never seen its like before."

In Time, Richard Zoglin characterized the reaction to the show as receiving "some rave reviews, a few equally passionate dissents and sellout crowds." Ben Brantley of The New York Times compared Mr. Burns to Giovanni Boccaccio's 14th-century book The Decameron in which a group of Italian youths have fled the Black Death to a villa where they begin to exchange stories. "At the end of Steve Cosson's vertiginous production, which opened on Sunday night at Playwrights Horizons, you’re likely to feel both exhausted and exhilarated from all the layers of time and thought you've traveled through", wrote Brantley. Reviewing for Vulture, Scott Brown found "Cape Feare" to be "a perfect palimpsest" and commended the ending musical number as "equal parts Brecht and Bart, Homer and the other Homer".

In his otherwise positive review, Brown noted that the play's "flabby middle act could use some tightening, to better dramatize Washburn’s talky deepthink." Marilyn Stasio wrote for Variety that the "piece loses sight of its humanity with an overproduced pop-rap-operetta in the underplotted second act". The Huffington Post's David Finkle felt that the play "could be contained in a 15-minute skit--if not quite a 140-character tweet" and that Washburn "stretches and stretches it through [its] three parts".

The play is mentioned in the 2015 The Simpsons episode "Let's Go Fly a Coot" as part of a list of recent post-apocalyptic films (despite the fact that it is not yet a film). In writer Mike Reiss's memoir about writing for the show, Springfield Confidential, he describes his disappointment with the play, saying that both it and the playwright failed because the play was what The Simpsons itself never was, "grim, pretentious and dull."

=== Awards ===
Year	Award	Subject	Result	Reference
2014	Drama League Award	Outstanding Production of a Broadway or Off-Broadway Play	Nominated	

== Analysis ==
Julie Grossman examined Mr. Burns as an instance of multilayered adaptation. She wrote that the show "challenges audiences to embrace the imaginative (if strange and alienating) scions, or adaptations, of cultural matter." In reference to characters in the play's second act bargaining for rights to and lines from other Simpsons episodes, she noted "That permissions and copyright have survived the apocalypse brings out the absurdity of owning the rights to artistic production and dialogue and the persistence of capitalism." Grossman differentiated Mr. Burns from Emily St. John Mandel's 2014 novel Station Eleven, which also examines storytelling in a postapocalyptic setting, in the types of catalysts for their respective apocalypse: a naturally occurring flu outbreak in Station Eleven versus an unnatural and greed-driven nuclear collapse in Mr. Burns. "Although the play's postmodern mash-up of television, film, and theater is highly entertaining, its powerful ethics resides in seeing capitalism and consumerism (symbolized by the greedy Simpsons character Mr. Burns) as the causes of civilization's decay."

== Film adaptation ==
In January 2026, filmmaker Boots Riley revealed he was working on turning Mr. Burns into a feature film.
