= Down the Rabbit Hole =

Down the Rabbit Hole may refer to:

== Literature ==
- Down the Rabbit Hole (novel), the first book in the Echo Falls mystery series, by Peter Abrahams
- Down the Rabbit Hole (memoir), by television personality and model Holly Madison
- Down the rabbit hole, an English language idiom, introduced by Lewis Carroll in the 1865 novel Alice's Adventures in Wonderland

== Television ==
- "Down the Rabbit Hole", the fifth episode of the fourth season of CSI:NY
- "Down the Rabbit Hole", the fifth episode of the thirteenth season of Chicago Fire
- "Down the Rabbit Hole" (Once Upon a Time in Wonderland), the first episode of Once Upon a Time in Wonderland
- "Down the Rabbit Hole", the fourteenth episode of the fourth season of The Vampire Diaries
- "Down the Rabbit Hole and Back Again", the third episode of anime series Inuyasha

== Other uses ==
- Down the Rabbit Hole (festival), annual music festival in the Netherlands
- "Down the Rabbit Hole", a song by Adam Lambert from the album For Your Entertainment
- "Down the Rabbit Hole", the first chapter of visual novel Wonderful Everyday

== See also ==
- Rabbit hole (disambiguation)
- What the Bleep Do We Know!?, released on DVD as What the Bleep! Down the Rabbit Hole - Quantum Edition
