= Casey Newton =

American technology journalist

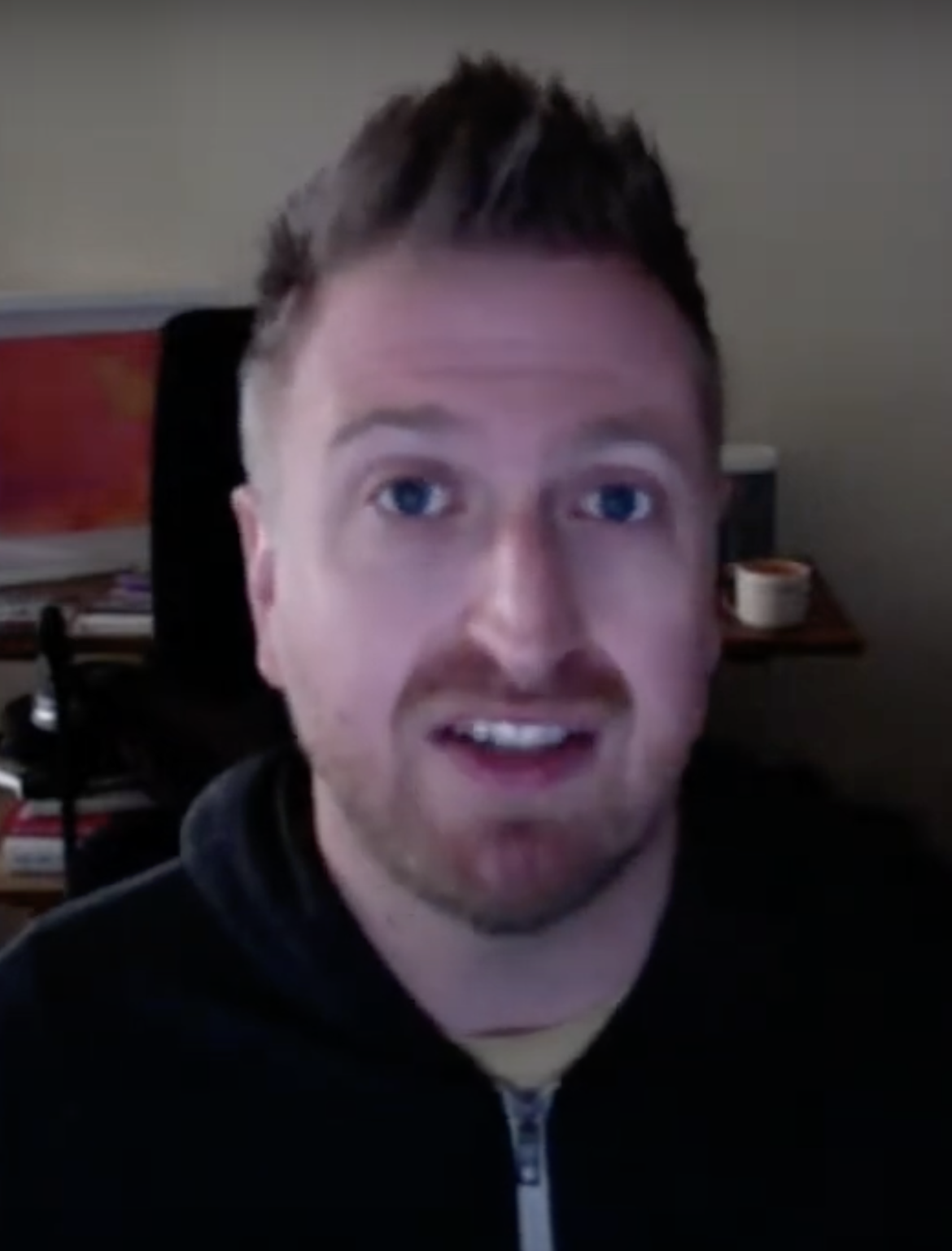
- Newton in 2021
- Born: June 19, 1980 (age 46); La Habra, California
- Education: B.S.J., Northwestern University
- Occupation: Journalist
- Website: cnewton.org

Casey Newton (born June 19, 1980) is an American technology journalist best known for creating the Platformer newsletter. He previously worked as a senior editor at The Verge.

== Career ==
Newton had been covering the Arizona State Legislature for The Arizona Republic, with an interest in technology as a hobby. Kristen Go, a former coworker at The Arizona Republic, invited him to work at the San Francisco Chronicle to cover tech companies and new technology. Later, he was a blogger and senior writer for CNET until 2013. Afterward, between 2013 and 2020, he covered Silicon Valley at The Verge and became a senior editor. During his time at The Verge, he wrote a daily newsletter called The Interface. His reporting on the effects of content moderation on workers (resulting in PTSD) has led to a contracting company cutting ties with Facebook.

== Platformer ==
In 2020, Newton left to publish his own newsletter, Platformer, on Substack. with the paid subscription costing US$10 per month. Substack incentivized authors with advances, which Newton turned down, but accepted healthcare stipends. As of January 2024, Platformer had 170,000 subscribers to the free edition. In January 2024, Newton decided to move Platformer off Substack to Ghost, in response to Substack's policies and handling of pro-Nazi publications on its platform.

Platformer initially focused on original reporting/scoops, news analysis and link roundups, but as of 2026 plans to focus more on original reporting to avoid competing with AI.

== Hard Fork ==
In late 2022, Newton began a weekly technology news podcast for the New York Times, called Hard Fork, co-hosting with Kevin Roose. In June 2026, Roose announced Hard Fork would end in August, and that he and Newton would "start a new show together, under our own shingle."

== Machine Gods ==
The new project, a 'video-first' evolution of their previous show, was announced in September 2026 aiming to provide deeper and nuanced insights into artificial intelligence. He and Roose hoped a partnership with NPR would maintain the broader reach and public service achieved with New York Times, despite being an independent venture. Machine Gods Media has a presence on YouTube and other social media. Machine Gods is expected to debut on 19 October.

== Personal life ==
Newton was born on June 19, 1980, and grew up in La Habra, California. He attended Sonora High School, where he served as a student board member and president of the debate club. He graduated from Northwestern University in 2002 with a Bachelor of Journalism.

He is gay and lives in San Francisco. In February of 2026, he announced on Hard Fork that he is engaged and that his fiancé works for Anthropic.
