= Saved (musical) =

Musical

- Music: Michael Friedman
- Lyrics: Michael Friedman
- Book: John Dempsey; Rinne Groff
- Basis: Film Saved!
- Productions: 2008 off-Broadway; 2010 Kansas City

Saved is a musical with music and lyrics by Michael Friedman and the book by John Dempsey and Rinne Groff. It is based on the 2004 film Saved!. It premiered off-Broadway at Playwrights Horizons in 2008.

== Productions ==
Saved premiered at Playwrights Horizons on June 3, 2008, and closed on June 22, 2008. Directed by Gary Griffin, the cast featured Celia Keenan-Bolger (Mary), John Dossett (Pastor Skip), and Julia Murney (Lillian). The choreography was by Sergio Trujillo, costumes by Jess Goldstein, lighting by Donald Holder, and sets by Scott Pask.

Time Out New York noted that Saved "runs on teen power — its cast features 13 young characters rocking out against two adult authority figures."

In 2009, Broadway In Chicago produced two workshops of '’Saved’’ directed by Gary Griffin. The cast was led by Northwestern University’s Laura Huizenga as Mary and featured other Chicago talent including Heidi Kettenring, Emily Thompson, Justin Berkobien, Jess Godwin, James Rank, Andrea Hochkeppel, and Jason Heymann.

The musical was produced by Kansas City Repertory, in Kansas City, Missouri, in September and October 2010, and directed by Griffin.

"The show's original creative team believed the show needed another opportunity to further its development. According to Griffin, ''Saved' is like many other successful musicals that do not reach their full potential in their first production. I believe we were only able to get a good first draft in New York, and it would be a shame to stop when we were just discovering the musical's strengths.'" The cast featured Sarah Gervais, Graham Rowat and Nick Spangler. The writers have continued to develop the musical, according to Playbill.

== Synopsis ==
At American Eagle Christian High School, Mary and her friend Hilary are seniors. Mary's boyfriend Dean tells her that he may be homosexual, and Mary has a religious vision. In her vision, she is advised to help him. However, her attempts at good deeds go awry, and she questions her faith and beliefs. The principal of the high school, Pastor Skip, and Mary's widowed mother Lillian are romantically involved.

== Musical numbers ==
Act One

- "In the Light of God" - Company
- "I'm Not That Kind of Girl" - Mary, Hilary Faye, Lana
- "Orlando" - Lillian
- "I Can't Help It" - Hilary Faye, The Christian Jewels
- "What's Wrong With Me?" - Dean, Mary, Company
- "Make It True" - Patrick, Company
- "Saved!" - Cassandra, Roland
- "What Am I Missing?" - Pastor Skip, Lillian, Mary, Patrick
- "Prayers" - Mary, Company

Act Two

- "Something Wrong" - Company
- "Changing" - Mary
- "Heaven" - Hilary Faye, Company
- "The Pastor's Son" - Patrick
- "I'm Not The Man I Thought I'd Be" - Pastor Skip, Patrick, Roland, Dean
- "Prayers (Reprise)" - Cassandra
- "How To" - Lillian, Mary
- "Prom" - The Christian Jewels, Company
- "Corithius" - Company

== Original cast ==
- Celia Keenan-Bolger - Mary
- Mary Faber - Hilary Faye
- Curtis Holbrook - Roland
- Van Hughes - Patrick
- Emily Walton - Tia
- Morgan Weed - Cassandra
- Aaron Tveit - Dean
- Juliana Ashley Hansen - Lana
- John Dossett - Pastor Skip
- Julia Murney - Lillian
- Josh Brekenridge - Shane
- Jason Michael Snow - Zac

== Awards and nominations ==
Lucille Lortel Award

- Outstanding Musical (nomination)
- Outstanding Choreographer (nomination)
