= Michael Friedman (composer) =

American Composer (1975 - 2017)

- Born: John Michael Friedman; September 24, 1975; Boston, Massachusetts, U.S.
- Died: September 9, 2017 (aged 41) New York City, U.S.
- Genre: Musical theatre
- Occupations: Composer; lyricist
- Years active: 2002–2017

John Michael Friedman (September 24, 1975 – September 9, 2017) was an American composer and lyricist. He was a Founding Associate Artist of theater company The Civilians.

His musical Bloody Bloody Andrew Jackson opened on Broadway in October 2010.

Friedman won a 2007 Obie Award for sustained excellence. Additionally, he received a MacDowell Fellowship, a Princeton Hodder Fellowship, a Meet The Composer Fellowship, and was a Barron Visiting Professor at The Princeton Environmental Institute in 2009. At the time of his death, he was the Artist in Residence and Director of the Public Forum at the Public Theater and was also the Artistic Director of City Center Encores! Off-Center.

== Background ==
Born in Boston, Friedman grew up in Philadelphia. He attended Germantown Friends School, after which he studied history and literature at Harvard College. While at Harvard, he studied under Bernard Rands, Mario Davidovsky, and Elizabeth Swados.

== Career ==
Friedman was most well known as the co-creator of the critically acclaimed musical Bloody Bloody Andrew Jackson which premiered in New York at the Public Theater and subsequently transferred to Broadway. Other credits include the musical Unknown Soldier, which premiered at the Williamstown Theatre Festival and had a critically acclaimed run at Playwright Horizons, Love’s Labour’s Lost, which premiered at the Delacorte Theater in Central Park and was nominated for a Drama Desk Award for Best Musical, Saved, In the Bubble, The Brand New Kid, God's Ear, The Blue Demon and This Beautiful City.

He worked with Itamar Moses on The Fortress of Solitude, an adaption based on the Jonathan Lethem book of the same name. It opened September 30, 2014 at The Public Theater.

In the months leading up to the 2016 U.S. Presidential Election, Michael traveled the country creating a series of songs based on interviews he conducted. Those songs became his “State of the Union Songbook,” which was presented by The New Yorker Radio Hour.

Michael was a founding Associate Artist of The Civilians, the acclaimed investigative theater company. His work with The Civilians included Gone Missing, In the Footprint, The Great Immensity, Paris Commune (co-written with Steve Cosson), (I Am) Nobody's Lunch, and This Beautiful City; as well as the score for Anne Washburn’s critically acclaimed Mr. Burns, a Post-Electric Play. His last collaboration with Civilians’ Artistic Director Cosson, The Abominables, opened at Children’s Theater Company in Minneapolis in September 2017.

His music has also been heard at the New York Shakespeare Festival, New York Theatre Workshop, Roundabout Theatre Company, Second Stage, Soho Repertory Theater, Signature Theatre, Theater for a New Audience, and The Acting Company. Regionally, his work has been featured at Hartford Stage, The Humana Festival of New American Plays, ART, Berkeley Rep, Dallas Theatre Center, Williamstown Theatre Festival, Portland Center Stage, and internationally at London's Soho and Gate Theatres and the Edinburgh Festival.

He was the dramaturg for the 2004 Broadway revival of A Raisin in the Sun, directed by Kenny Leon.

At the time of his death, he was writing a commissioned work on American history for the Oregon Shakespeare Festival and a musical about the adult film industry with Bess Wohl and The Civilians titled Pretty Filthy.

=== The Civilians ===
With The Civilians, Friedman was the composer and lyricist for Canard, Canard, Goose?, Gone Missing, [I Am] Nobody's Lunch, This Beautiful City, The Great Immensity, and In the Footprint, and co-author of Paris Commune. His work on Pretty Filthy can be seen in the theater company's premiere production of the new musical.

In partnership with Ghostlight Records, the Civilians will be releasing cast recordings of nine shows that Friedman wrote or co-wrote. The first three, The Great Immensity, This Beautiful City, and The Abominables were released on October 18, 2019. Recordings of Paris Commune and (I Am) Nobody's Lunch were released on August 14, 2020.

== Death and legacy ==
In July 2017, Friedman was diagnosed as HIV-positive, with the disease already advanced to a significant degree. He began taking medication and continued to work as he was able, but his health declined quickly, and in August, he developed acute respiratory distress syndrome, as a complication of HIV/AIDS; he was admitted to NYU Langone Health in Manhattan, where he died on September 9, 2017, aged 41.

In 2018, he received a star on the Playwrights’ Sidewalk at the Lucille Lortel Theater.

== Notable works ==
- Canard, Canard, Goose? (2002)
- Paris Commune (2004)
- (I Am) Nobody's Lunch (2006)
- Gone Missing (2007)
- This Beautiful City (2008)
- Saved (2008)
- Bloody Bloody Andrew Jackson (2008)
- In the Footprint (2010)
- Mr. Burns, a Post-Electric Play (2012) (Incidental music)
- The Fortress of Solitude (2012)
- Love’s Labour’s Lost (2013)
- Pretty Filthy (2015)
- Rimbauld in New York (2016) (with many others)
- The Abominables (2017)

== Awards and nominations ==
Year	Award	Category	Work	Result
2008	Lucille Lortel Award	Outstanding Musical	Saved	Nominated
2010	Drama Desk Award	Outstanding Music	Bloody Bloody Andrew Jackson	Nominated
2010	Drama League Awards	Distinguished Production of a Musical	Bloody Bloody Andrew Jackson	Nominated
2010	Outer Critics Circle Awards	Outstanding New Off-Broadway Musical	Bloody Bloody Andrew Jackson	Won
2010	Outer Critics Circle Awards	Outstanding New Score (Broadway or Off-Broadway)	Bloody Bloody Andrew Jackson	Nominated
2014	Drama Desk Award	Outstanding Musical	Love Labour's Lost	Nominated
2014	Drama Desk Award	Outstanding Lyrics	Love Labour's Lost	Nominated
2014	Drama League Award	Outstanding Production of a Broadway or Off-Broadway Play	Mr. Burns, a Post-Electric Play	Nominated
2015	Drama Desk Award	Outstanding Musical	Pretty Filthy	Nominated
2015	Drama Desk Award	Outstanding Music	The Fortress of Solitude	Nominated
2015	Drama Desk Award	Outstanding Lyrics	The Fortress of Solitude	Nominated
2015	Outer Critics Circle Award	Outstanding New Off-Broadway Musical	The Fortress of Solitude	Nominated
