= The Mend (film) =

- Directed by: John Magary
- Written by: John Magary
- Produced by: Myna Joseph; Michael Prall; Robert Fernandez; Dan Levinson; Michael Hacker; Susannah Hacker
- Starring: Josh Lucas; Stephen Plunkett; Mickey Sumner; Lucy Owen; Austin Pendleton
- Cinematography: Chris Teague
- Edited by: Joseph Krings
- Music by: Judd Greenstein; Michi Wiancko
- Production company: Moxie Pictures
- Release date: March 9, 2014 (SXSW)
- Running time: 111 minutes
- Country: United States
- Language: English

The Mend is an American comedy-drama film written and directed by John Magary. The film stars Josh Lucas, Stephen Plunkett, Mickey Sumner and Lucy Owen. It premiered at South by Southwest on March 9, 2014, and opened in selected theaters on August 21, 2015.

== Plot ==
The film opens to a seemingly domestic scene involving Mat (Josh Lucas), his girlfriend Andrea (Lucy Owen) and her son from a previous relationship. After a fiery breakup with his girlfriend, Mat is seen wandering the streets of New York with apparently nowhere to go. Meanwhile, Alan (Stephen Plunkett) and his girlfriend Farrah (Mickey Sumner) are caught up in conversation in the aftermath of an ill-fated sexual encounter, preparing for a house party in their small Harlem brownstone apartment. The guests include friends of Farrah from her job working at a New York modern dance company as well as Alan's co-workers from his job as a legal aid lawyer. In the midst of the party, as Farrah tends to guests, she spots Mat seated in the living room and Alan and Mat make eye contact linking the two seemingly separate story lines.

At the party, Alan informs Mat that he is about to leave the next morning with Farrah for a vacation to Quebec, where he intends to propose to his girlfriend. Later in the evening, Earl (Austin Pendleton), a friend of Mat and Alan's father, arrives at the party escorted by a significantly younger, attractive Korean filmmaker. Earl regales the party guests with stories of his adventures in the late 1970s along with Mat and Alan's father including a threesome sexual encounter. The party winds down early the next morning and Farrah awakens to realize that she and Alan are late for their flight. As Alan and Farrah hurry to the airport, Mat awakens in the empty apartment.

Expecting his brother to be gone for two weeks, Mat settles into the apartment making himself at home. Mat explores his new surroundings venturing briefly out into the neighborhood before retreating to his brother's apartment. After injuring his foot on the broken shards of a jar he had dropped earlier, summons his girlfriend Andrea and the two apparently reconcile as she tends to his injury. Andrea, who has been displaced from her apartment as a result of a bed bug infestation brings her son Ronnie (Cory Nichols) to Alan's apartment and the three of them set up house. Mat and Ronnie locate an abandoned television (Alan had previously not had a television in the apartment) on the street and set it up in the apartment shortly before Alan's apartment begins experiencing intermittent power outages.

Alan returns from his vacation alone and much earlier than expected to find his brother and several other guests sleeping in his apartment. Rather than confronting his unexpected guests, Alan passively accepts the presence of the unwanted guests. After Ronnie goes to stay with his father, Mat, Andrea and Alan spend a tumultuous evening together. The next day while walking through Riverside Park, Alan breaks down and confides in Andrea that Farrah had left him during their vacation and he had not been able to propose. Alan also reveals that he is very sad and angry although these attributes are often repressed. Mat grows frustrated by the deepening bond between Alan and Andrea and provokes a confrontation with Andrea that results in her angrily leaving the apartment. Alan restrains Mat who wants to continue berating Andrea as she leaves the apartment.

Later that evening, Alan ventures downtown where he wanders through the Feast of San Gennaro. On his way to meet Mat at a bar with some old friends, Alan gets involved in a fight with three rowdy men on the street. Alan arrives at the bar with a noticeable bruise on his face. The evening descends into drunken and drug-fueled debauchery. Mat and Alan traipse through St. Nicholas Park, stumbling on a film crew producing what appears to be a 19th-century period piece. The two brothers harass a member of the crew and steal his walkie-talkie before finally making it back to the apartment. Beginning to sober, Alan wonders aloud whether Farrah will return.

The next morning Mat and Alan begin to reach their respective boiling points. Unable to open a locked bathroom door, the brothers begin stabbing at the door with a kitchen knife before turning their aggression on each other. Alan various problems overflow and he briefly sees a visage of his infirmed father before confronting Mat. As Mat and Alan's confrontation is about the come to a head, the door to the apartment opens and Farrah returns. As she talks to Alan, Mat leaves the apartment seemingly without any destination. The film closes and we see that Alan and Farrah are continuing to live together several months later however their interactions appear icy and distant. The film ends with the various characters never having fully resolved the myriad issues in their complex lives that had seemed to be promised by the title of the film.

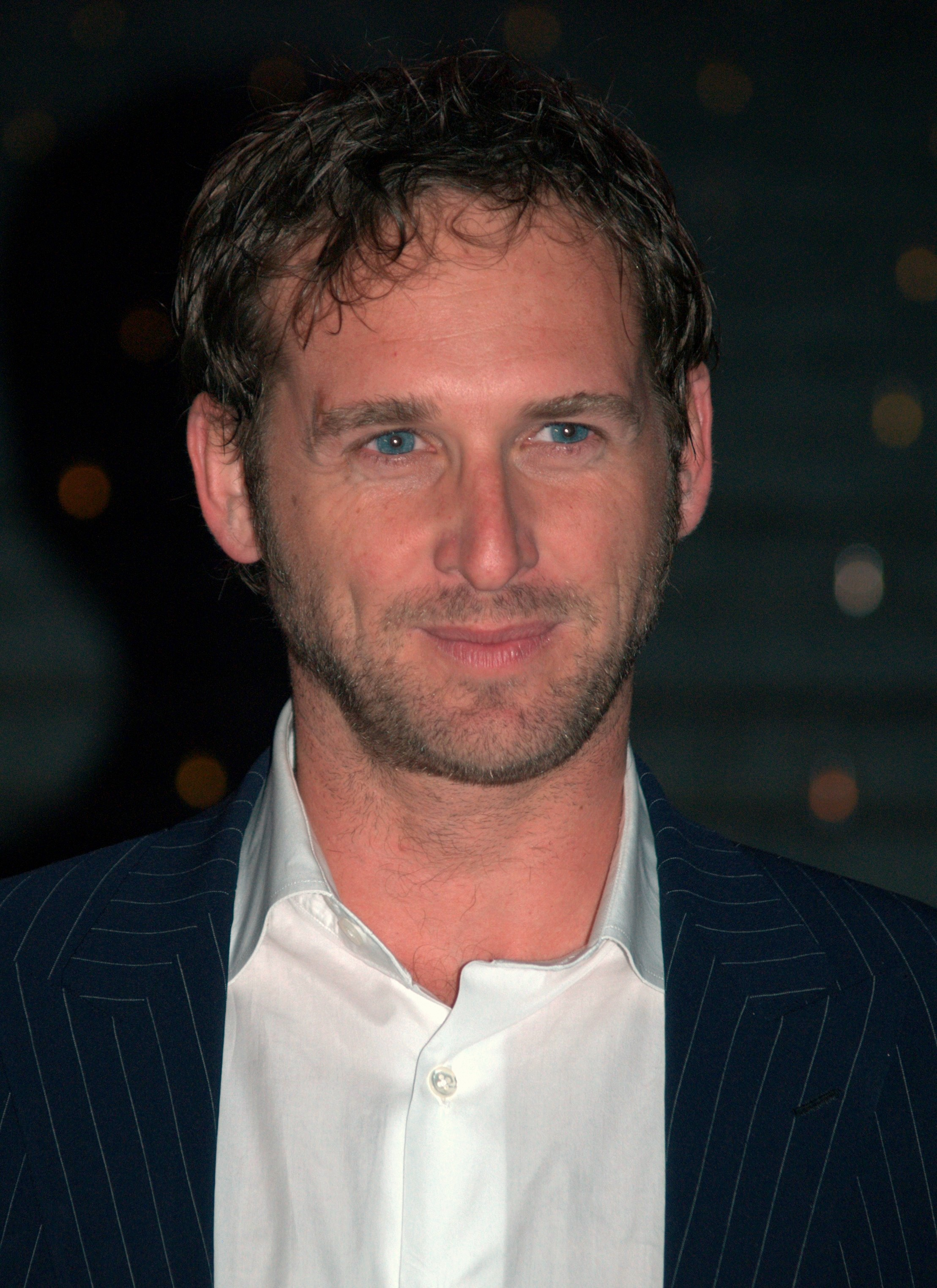
Josh Lucas, seen here in April 2009, was cast in the lead role of Mat in The Mend

== Cast ==
- Josh Lucas as Mat
- Stephen Plunkett as Alan
- Mickey Sumner as Farrah
- Lucy Owen as Andrea
- Cory Nichols as Ronnie
- Louisa Krause as Elinor
- Austin Pendleton as Earl
- Sarah Steele as Sarah
- Samantha Sherman as Jodi

== Production ==
Filming for The Mend was completed on location in New York City during October 2013.

The Mend marks the feature film directorial debut of John Magary. Magary had previously directed the 2008 short film The Second Line, which was an official selection at the Sundance Film Festival.

== Reception ==
The Mend was one of 8 films selected from among 1,324 submissions to premiere at the SXSW Film Festival in March 2014.

It has a score of 78% on Rotten Tomatoes and a score of 76 out of 100 on Metacritic. The film was profiled by Time as one of top 10 films at the 2014 SXSW Film Festival and received a series of favorable reviews from critics. The film's script is noted for its "good ear for conversational dialogue [and] a real knack for creating a lived-in vibe".

The Hollywood Reporter called the film "a convincing and refreshingly indirect examination of handed down emotional flaws" and noted that "Josh Lucas offers one of his strongest performances to date." Also held out for praise was the film's "edgy vibe enhanced by the string section performing Judd Greenstein and Michi Wiancko's modernist score."
