= Small Mouth Sounds =

2015 play by Bess Wohl

- Original language: English
- Written by: Bess Wohl
- Setting: Upstate New York; Present day

Premiere
- Date: March 23, 2015
- Place: Ars Nova (off-Broadway)

Small Mouth Sounds is a dramatic absurdist stage play written by American playwright Bess Wohl.

The play tells the story of six adults who run away from their hectic inner city life to a silent retreat in upstate New York. They then have to make peace with the silence of their own minds while trying to find ways to connect without words.

The play is unique in that there is very little dialogue and requires the actors to express their emotions and feelings physically rather than verbally.

== Production history ==
=== Ars Nova (2015) ===
The play premiered at Ars Nova, Off-Broadway in New York City on March 24, 2015. This production was directed by Rachel Chavkin.

=== Signature Theatre (2016) ===
The play returned Off-Broadway the following year, opening July 13, 2016 at the Romulus Linney Courtyard Stage at the Pershing Square Signature Center, with Chakvin as director and many returning cast. Marcia Debonis was nominated for a Drama League Award for her performance. Wohl received the John Gassner Award for Best New Play from the Outer Critics Circle Awards.

=== National Tour (2017) ===
The play went on tour in 2017, opening at the Long Wharf Theatre on August 29, 2017 and continuing to play in San Francisco, Santa Monica, Dallas, Miami, and Philadelphia.

=== Chicago (2018) ===
The play had its premiere production in Chicago beginning October 18, 2018 at A Red Orchid Theatre, directed by Shade Murray. This production was nominated for two Jeff Awards for Best Sound Design and Best Ensemble.

=== Toronto (2022) ===
The play had its Canadian premiere in Toronto beginning April 8, 2022 at The Red Sandcastle Theatre, directed by Olivia Daniels.

=== Broadway (2027) ===
The play will premiere on Broadway in 2027 at the Ethel Barrymore Theatre, directed by Joe Mantello. Previews are set to begin February 10, with an opening date set for March 11. The production will be produced by Scott Rudin.

== Original casts ==
Character	Ars Nova (2015)	Signature (2016)	Tour (2017)	Chicago (2018)	Toronto (2022)	Broadway (2027)
Judy	Sakina Jaffrey	Quincy Tyler Bernstine	Cherene Snow	Cynthia Hines	Merril Matthews	Sarah Paulson
Joan	Marcia Debonis	Marcia Debonis	Socorro Santiago	Jennifer Engstrom	Ashlie White	Julia Roberts
Alicia	Jessica Almasy	Zoë Winters	Brenna Palughi	Heather Chrisler	Sidney Klips	Greta Lee
Jan	Erik Lochtefeld	Max Baker	Connor Barrett	Lawrence Grimm	Nicholas Koy Santillo	Martin Freeman
Ned	Brad Heberlee	Brad Heberlee	Ben Beckley	Levi Holloway	Jack Everett	Paul Rudd
Rodney	Babak Tafti	Babak Tafti	Edward Chin-Lyn	Travis A. Knight	Ziye Hu	Isaac Powell
The Teacher / A Voice	JoJo Gonzalez	JoJo Gonzalez	Orville Mendoza	Meighan Gerachis	Ryan Perera	
