= Bess Wohl =

American dramatist

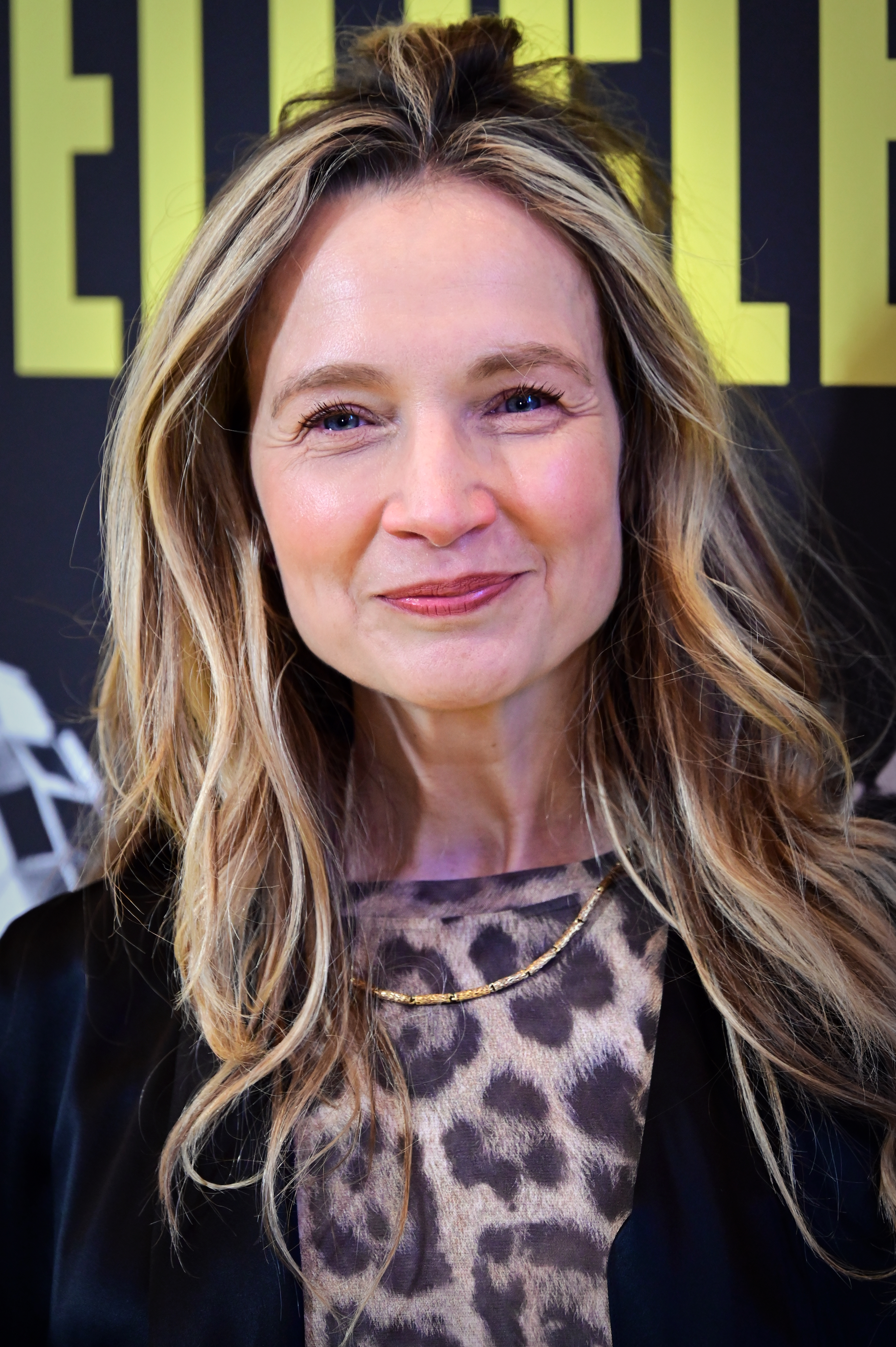
- Wohl in 2026
- Education: Harvard University (BA); Yale University (MFA)
- Occupations: Playwright; screenwriter; actress
- Awards: Pulitzer Prize for Drama; Tony Award for Best Play

Bess Wohl is an American playwright, screenwriter, and actress whose plays include Grand Horizons, Small Mouth Sounds, Liberation, and the book for the musical Pretty Filthy with composer/lyricist Michael Friedman and The Civilians. For Grand Horizons, Wohl was nominated for the 2020 Tony Award for Best Play. Her play Liberation was awarded the 2026 Pulitzer Prize for Drama and the 2026 Tony Award for Best Play.

== Early life ==
Wohl grew up in Brooklyn, New York, where she developed a love of theater. She went to Harvard College for an BA in English, and then went to the Yale School of Drama for an MFA in acting. While at Yale, she created the play Cats Talk Back, which went on to the New York International Fringe Festival, where it won Best Overall Production. She describes her heritage as Jewish, Mormon, and Irish Catholic.

== Career ==
Wohl's plays have been produced in numerous venues in New York City and around the United States.

Her play, Barcelona premiered in 2012 at the Contemporary American Theater Festival, before transferring to Los Angeles at the Geffen Playhouse, starring Betty Gilpin and Carlos Leal. In 2024, it made its West End debut in a production starring Lily Collins and Álvaro Morte.

Pretty Filthy, which ran Off-Broadway from January 2015 to March 1, 2015, was nominated for the 2015 Lucille Lortel Award, Outstanding Musical, and the 2015 Drama Desk Award, Outstanding Musical. Bess also won the 2015 Sam Norkin Special Drama Desk Award for “establishing herself as an important voice in New York theater, and having a breakthrough year.”

Small Mouth Sounds premiered Off-Broadway at Ars Nova in 2015 to wide critical acclaim. The play also was produced in 2016 at the Off-Broadway Signature Theatre and has been performed in a US national tour in 2017. Wohl won the Outer Critics Circle John Gassner Award, presented for an American play, preferably by a new playwright for Small Mouth Sounds in 2017.

Wohl's Grand Horizons began previews on Broadway at the Hayes Theater, presented by Second Stage Theater on December 23, 2019 and opened on January 23, 2020. This play marked her Broadway debut. Grand Horizons premiered at the Williamstown Theatre Festival in July 2019, directed by Leigh Silverman. The play is co-commissioned by Williamstown Theatre Festival and Second Stage Theater. Grand Horizons was nominated for the 2020 Tony Award for Best Play.

Her play Camp Siegfried opened at The Old Vic theatre in London in September 2021.

She then wrote the play, Liberation, which explores the second-wave feminism movement in the 1970s in Ohio. Wohl said she was inspired to write the play by her mother, Lisa Cronin Wohl, who worked at Ms. magazine during her youth. The play opened to acclaim, with the New York Times calling it "gutting and inventive," and it was nominated for the 2025 Drama Desk Award for Outstanding Play and won the 2025 Outer Critics Circle Award for Outstanding New Off-Broadway Play. The play transferred to Broadway in fall of 2025 at the James Earl Jones Theatre, as Wohl's second Broadway credit.

== Credits ==
Year	Title	Role	Venue	Ref.
2004	Chinese Friends	Alegra	Off-Broadway, Playwrights Horizons	
2014	American Hero	Playwright	Off-Broadway, Second Stage Theatre	
2015	Pretty Filthy	Book	Off-Broadway, Abrons Arts Center	
2015	Small Mouth Sounds	Playwright	Off-Broadway, Ars Nova	
2016	Small Mouth Sounds	Playwright	Off-Broadway, Signature Theatre Company	
2017	Small Mouth Sounds	Playwright	U.S. National Tour	
2019	Continuity	Playwright	Off-Broadway, Manhattan Theatre Club	
2019	Make Believe	Playwright	Off-Broadway, Second Stage Theatre	
2019	Grand Horizons	Playwright	Regional, Williamstown Theatre Festival	
2020	Grand Horizons	Playwright	Broadway, Hayes Theater	
2021	Camp Siegfried	Playwright	West End, The Old Vic Theatre	
2024	Barcelona	Playwright	West End, Duke of York's Theatre	
2025	Liberation	Playwright	Off-Broadway, Laura Pels Theatre	
2025	Liberation	Playwright	Broadway, James Earl Jones Theatre	
2027	Liberation	Playwright	West End, TBA	

== Honors and awards ==
Year	Award	Category	Work	Result	Ref.
2015	Drama Desk Award	Sam Norkin Off-Broadway Award	American Hero, Pretty Filthy and Small Mouth Sounds	Won	
2017	Outer Critics Circle Awards	John Gassner Playwright Award	Small Mouth Sounds	Won	
2020	Tony Award	Best Play	Grand Horizons	Nominated	
2020	Drama League Award	Outstanding Production of a Play	Grand Horizons	Nominated	
2020	Outer Critics Circle Award	Outstanding New Off-Broadway Play	Make Believe	Nominated	
2022	Evening Standard Theatre Awards	Promising Playwright		Nominated	
2025	Drama Desk Award	Outstanding Play	Liberation	Nominated	
2025	Outer Critics Circle Awards	Outstanding New Off-Broadway Play	Liberation	Won	
2025	Drama League Award	Outstanding Production of a Play	Liberation	Nominated	
2026	Drama League Award	Outstanding Production of a Play	Liberation	Won	
2026	Tony Award	Best Play	Liberation	Won	
2026	Pulitzer Prize	Pulitzer Prize for Drama	Liberation	Won	
