= Kevin Roose =

Technology columnist and author

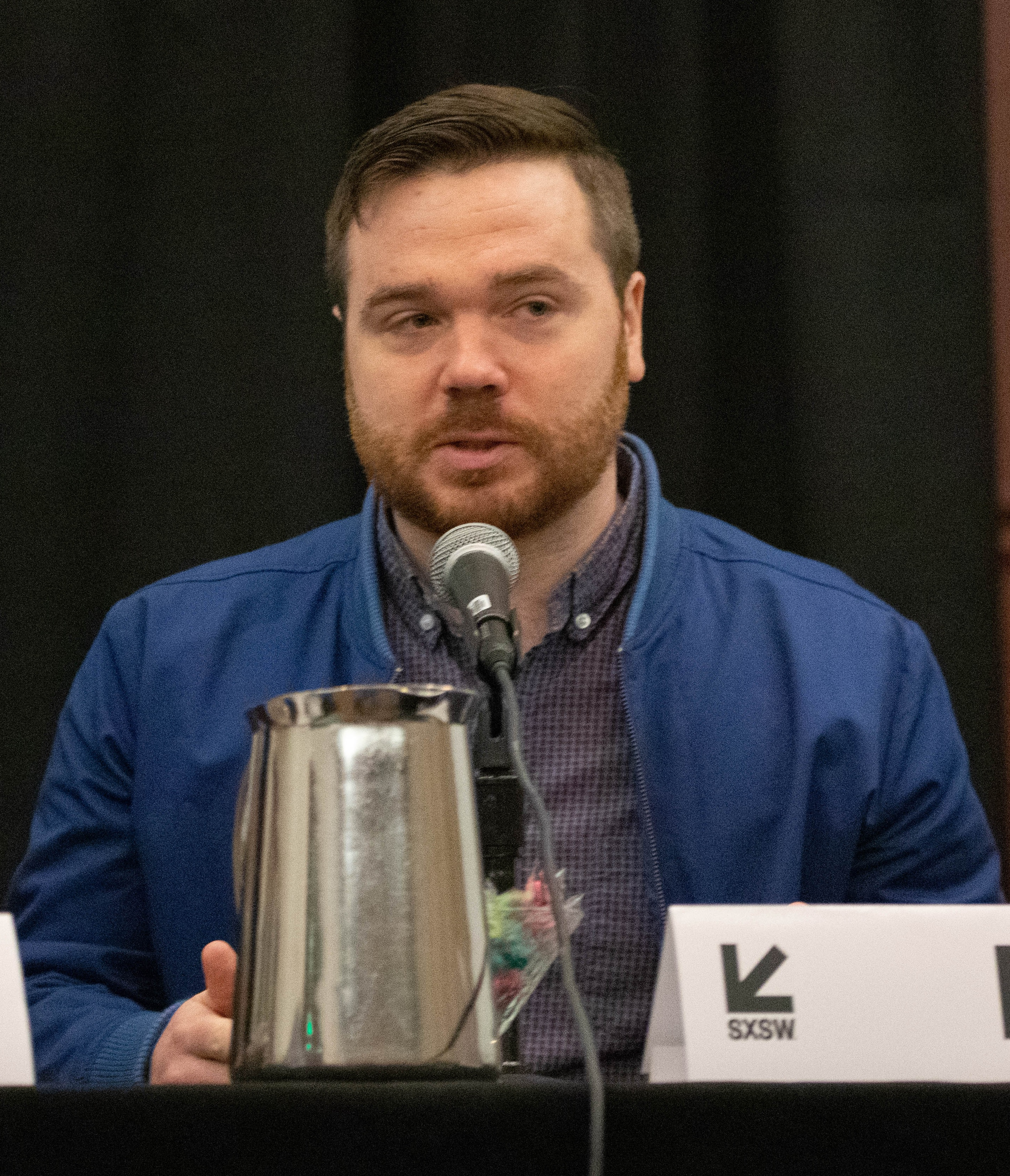
- Roose at South by Southwest 2019
- Born: 1987 or 1988 (age 38–39)
- Education: Brown University
- Occupations: Writer, journalist
- Notable credit: The New York Times
- Website: www.kevinroose.com

Kevin Burns Roose is a San Francisco-based American author and journalist. From 2017 to 2026, he worked for The New York Times as a technology columnist and co-host of the Hard Fork podcast with Casey Newton. In 2026, Roose and Newton announced a new show, Machine Gods.

Roose is the author of four books. Roose was included on the 2015 Forbes 30 Under 30 list.

== Life and career ==
Roose grew up in Ohio. His father is a lawyer and his mother was an administrator at Oberlin College. Roose is a graduate of Westtown School and Brown University. He worked as news director at Fusion.

In June 2017, he rejoined The New York Times. His column, "The Shift", focused on the intersection of technology, business, and culture.

Roose and three of his New York Times colleagues earned the 2018 Gerald Loeb Award for Breaking News with their story on Uber.

On March 24, 2021, Roose published a column in The New York Times announcing an auction for the column itself to be distributed as an NFT, or non-fungible token, with proceeds going to The New York Times's Neediest Cases Fund. The column sold the following day for $560,000. Immediately after the sale, Roose commented on Twitter, "I'm just staring at my screen laughing uncontrollably".

Roose was given early access to Bing's ChatGPT-based chatbot and encountered a second personality of the chatbot named "Sydney". He has also written about his experiences with "vibe coding" to generate software without writing code.

He was the co-host of The New York Times podcast Hard Fork with Casey Newton between 2022 and 2026. Three months after announcing their departure from Hard Fork in June 2026, Roose and Newton announced a new independent video-first show, "Machine Gods" in partnership with NPR.

== Writing ==
Roose wrote The Unlikely Disciple while undercover at Liberty University, aiming to explore the culture of life at a fundamentalist evangelical university. Roose, raised in a secular and liberal environment, wanted to better understand conservative Christian culture.

Roose's second book, Young Money, follows the beginning of the career of eight financial analysts on Wall Street. It focuses on the difficult and strenuous work environments and what makes the financial industry different after the 2008 financial crisis.

Roose's third book, Futureproof: 9 Rules in the Age of Automation, examines how people and organisations can survive in the machine age. To survive, he believes in the need "to focus on the more human skills that machines can't replace."

Roose's fourth book, published in 2026, is titled The AGI Chronicles: The Inside Story of the Race to Create an Artificial Superintelligence.

== Other work ==
In 2020, Kevin Roose hosted Rabbit Hole, an eight-part podcast from The New York Times "examining how the internet is changing us".

From 2022 to June 2026, Roose co-hosted with Casey Newton the New York Times podcast Hard Fork. After leaving the New York Times, Roose and Newton announced their new show Machine Gods distributed by NPR. It will be a video-first, twice-weekly show that debuts on YouTube, the NPR app, and podcast RSS, and later, to the NPR Member station radio network in early 2027.
