= Pretty Filthy =

2015 Off-Broadway musical

- 2015 Off-Broadway production poster
- Music: Michael Friedman
- Lyrics: Michael Friedman
- Book: Bess Wohl
- Productions: 2015 Off-Broadway

Pretty Filthy is a 2015 musical with a book by Bess Wohl and music and lyrics by Michael Friedman developed with director Steve Cosson. The musical is produced by American "investigative" theater company The Civilians. The show is based on The Civilians' visit to the San Fernando Valley, also known as "the Hollywood of the adult film industry." The musical focuses on the private and professional lives of either real-life adult film stars or composite characters based on various people, with each actor playing multiple roles.

== Plot ==
Described as a "porn docu-musical," the show follows several vignettes of adult film stars, focusing extensively on Becky, a young woman just beginning in the industry. She moves to Los Angeles, where she gets a manager and changes her name to Taylor St. Ives. Throughout her experience, she brings along her boyfriend Bobby, who himself becomes an adult film star, and meets veteran star Georgina Congress, exploring the challenges of the industry in forming relationships, gender parity and the evolution since its inception.

== Production history ==
Originally commissioned by Center Theatre Group in Los Angeles, the show premiered Off-Broadway at The Playhouse in the Abrons Arts Center and ran from January 31 to March 1, 2015. The production was directed by co-conceiver Steve Cosson and starred Alyse Alan Louis as Becky/Taylor St. Ives, Marrick Smith as Bobby/Dick Everhard/Peter North, and Lulu Fall, Luba Mason, Maria-Christina Oliveras, Steve Rosen and Nick Harding in various roles.

The show received positive reviews, with Variety praising Cosson's "even-handed direction" and the characters as "enjoyable" and "endearing." The Hollywood Reporter called the show "pretty filthy. But it’s also pretty damn fun" with some criticism for the show's benevolence toward heavier issues the characters would face.

== Cast and characters ==
Character	Off-Broadway 2015
Jimmy Wood, Fredo and others	John Behlmann
Brown Sugar, Sunny Leone, and others	Lulu Fall
Becky/Taylor St. Ives	Alyse Alan Louis
Georgina Congress	Luba Mason
Shy Love, Sunny Lane, Holly, Carrie, and others	Maria-Christina Oliveras
Sam Spiegel, Oscar, and others	Steve Rosen
Bobby/Dick Everhard, Peter North/Matt Ramsey	Marrick Smith
Jared Zirilli	Nick Harding

== Musical numbers ==
- Names — Full Company
- What If I Like It — Becky/Taylor and Company
- Impossible Girls — Sam Spiegel
- Porn Capitalism — Carrie and Brown Sugar
- The First Video Stars — Georgina Congress
- Squirting 101 — Fredo
- Becky & Bobby & Taylor & Dick — Becky/Taylor and Bobby/Dick
- Waiting for Wood — Male Company
- Porn House — Full Company
- Fuck the World — Peter North/Matt Ramsey
- Applesauce — Holly and Oscar
- Beautiful — Georgina Congress
- Pretty/Filthy — Becky/Taylor and Company

== Recording ==
The original cast recording was released on November 18, 2016 by Ghostlight Records.

== Awards and nominations ==
=== 2015 Off-Broadway production ===
Year	Award Ceremony	Category	Nominee	Result	Ref.
2015
2015	Drama Desk Awards	Outstanding Musical		Nominated	
2015	Drama Desk Awards	Outstanding Featured Actress in a Musical	Luba Mason	Nominated	
2015	Lucille Lortel Awards	Outstanding Musical		Nominated	
2015	Lucille Lortel Awards	Outstanding Featured Actor in a Musical	Steve Rosen	Nominated	
2015	Lucille Lortel Awards	Outstanding Featured Actress in a Musical	Luba Mason	Nominated	
