= Rabbit Hole (podcast) =

Podcast by the New York Times

Rabbit Hole is a podcast produced by The New York Times and hosted by Kevin Roose that discusses internet radicalization.

== Background ==
Each episode is about 30 minutes in length and is hosted by Kevin Roose and Andy Mills. The show has a total of eight episodes. The production team included Andy Mills, Julia Longoria, Larissa Anderson, Sindhu Gnanasambandan, and Wendy Dorr. The podcast was released during the COVID-19 pandemic, when people were quarantining and spending an increased amount of time on the internet. YouTube's content recommendation algorithm is designed to keep the user engaged for as long as possible, which Roose calls the "rabbit hole effect". The podcast features interviews with a variety of people involved with YouTube and the "rabbit hole effect". For instance, in episode four, Roose interviews Susan Wojcicki—the CEO of YouTube. The podcast was created after multiple shootings that were tied to online radicalization, such as the Christchurch mosque shootings. The first three episodes of the show focus on Caleb Cain and how his YouTube search history shifted from politically moderate videos to far-right conspiracy theories. Cain started by watching video game commentary, then Joe Rogan, and then began watching further right figures like Stefan Molyneux. Vanity Fair named the show one of the seven podcasts that defined the 2020s. Both Teen Vogue and The Atlantic included the show on their lists of the best podcasts of 2020.
