= Les Waters =

British theatre director

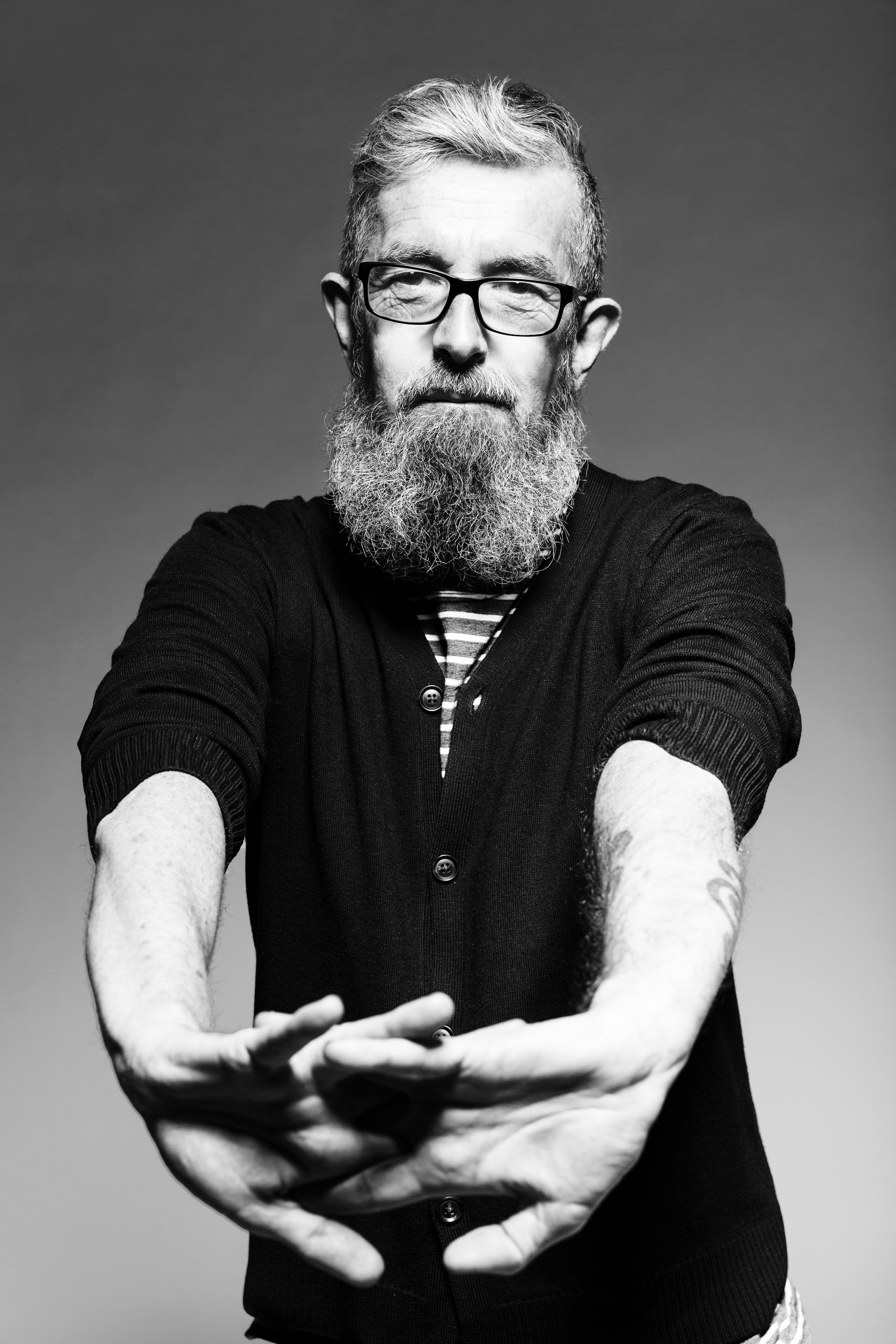
- Les Waters in 2015
- Born: Leslie Waters; April 1952 (age 74); Cleethorpes, England
- Occupation: Theatre director

Leslie Waters (born April 1952) is a British theatre director based in New York City. Waters was the Artistic Director of the Actors Theatre of Louisville from 2012 to 2018. He has directed plays Off-Broadway and also at Berkeley Repertory Theatre and Actors Theatre.

He was born in Cleethorpes, England.

== Career ==
In his native England, Waters worked with the Bristol Old Vic, Hampstead Theatre Club, Joint Stock Theatre Company, National Theatre, Royal Court Theatre and Traverse Theatre Club.

From 1995 to 2003, Waters led the M.F.A. directing program at UC San Diego.

He served as associate artistic director of Berkeley Repertory Theatre from 2003 to 2011. His productions at Berkeley Rep include the world premieres of Chuck Mee's Fêtes de la Nuit, Jordan Harrison's Finn in the Underworld, Sarah Ruhl's In the Next Room (or The Vibrator Play) and Adele Edling Shank's To the Lighthouse; the American premiere of Will Eno'sTragedy: a tragedy; the West Coast premiere of Sarah Ruhl's Eurydice; and extended runs of The Glass Menagerie, The Pillowman, The Lieutenant of Inishmore, and Yellowman.

From 2012-2018, he served as the Artistic Director of the Actors Theatre of Louisville. At Actors Theatre, Waters’ directing credits included the world premieres of Mark Schultz's "Evocation to Visible Appearance", Anne Washburn's and Dave Malloy's "Little Bunny Foo Foo", Jorge Ignacio Cortiñas’ Recent Alien Abductions, Sarah Ruhl’s For Peter Pan on her 70th birthday, Chuck Mee’s The Glory of the World, Naomi Iizuka’s At the Vanishing Point, Lucas Hnath’s The Christians, and Will Eno’s Gnit. Additional directing credits at Actors Theatre include Macbeth, Luna Gale, Our Town, Girlfriend and Long Day’s Journey into Night. Les Waters’ directing debut with Actors Theatre was at the 2000 Humana Festival of New American Plays, where he directed the world premiere of Chuck Mee’s Big Love. In 2002 Waters and Mee received the Obie Award Special Citation for Big Love.

His New York credits include directing for BAM, Classic Stage Company, the Connelly Theatre, Manhattan Theatre Club, Playwrights Horizons, The Public Theater/New York Shakespeare Festival, Second Stage Theatre, Signature Theatre Company, Clubbed Thumb and Soho Rep. Elsewhere in America, he has directed for A Contemporary Theatre, American Conservatory Theater, American Repertory Theatre, Arena Stage, the Guthrie Theater, La Jolla Playhouse, the Mark Taper Forum, Steppenwolf Theatre Company, Goodman Theatre and Yale Repertory Theatre.

Since 2018, Waters has been a freelance director based in New York.

== Honors ==
- In the last 10 years, his shows have ranked among the year’s best in The New Yorker, The New York Times, Time Out New York, Time Magazine, The Guardian and USA Today.
- He won an Obie Award in 2002 for Big Love, staging its premiere at the Humana Festival.
- Drama-Logue Award
- Edinburgh Fringe First Award
- KPBS Patte
- Several awards from critics’ circles in the Bay Area, Connecticut and Tokyo.
