= Quincy Tyler Bernstine =

American actress and audiobook narrator

- Education: Brown University (BA); University of California, San Diego (MFA)
- Occupations: Actress; audiobook narrator
- Awards: Obie Award for Distinguished Performance by an Actress (2019)

Quincy Tyler Bernstine is an American actress and audiobook narrator. In 2019, she won the Obie Award for Sustained Excellence of Performance for her work in Off-Broadway theatre.

== Education ==
Bernstine has a Bachelor of Arts degree from Brown University and Master of Fine Arts from the University of California, San Diego.

== Filmography ==
=== Film ===
Year	Title	Role	Note
2008	Rachel Getting Married	12Step Receptionist	
2008	Life in Flight	Cali	
2012	Red Hook Summer	Hazel	
2014	Da Sweet Blood of Jesus	Usherette / Sister Hazel	
2014	Hungry Hearts	Nurse	
2014	While We're Young	Pepper	
2014	Ned Rifle	Mary	
2014	Still Alice	Nursing Home Administrator	
2016	Manchester by the Sea	Marianne (3rd Tenant)	
2017	Easy Living	Liz	
2021	Marys Seacole	Mary	Filmed production
2021	The Tender Bar	Sidney's Mom	
2022	Allswell in New York	Sandra	
2022	White Noise	Evacuee with Theory	

=== Television ===
Year	Title	Role	Note
2004	Chappelle's Show	Brenda Johnson / Rounds	Episode: "I Know Black People & When Keeping It Real Goes Wrong"
2005	Law & Order: Criminal Intent	Pam Gaffney	Episode: "Sex Club"
2007	HBO Voyeur Project		Miniseries
2007	Law & Order: Special Victims Unit	Sheri Simkins	Episode: "Alternate"
2009	Great Performances	Josephine Baker	Episode: "Harlem in Montmartre: A Paris Jazz Story"
2014	The Leftovers	Dr. Singley	Episode: "The Garveys at Their Best"
2014	Madam Secretary	Pam Foster	Episode: "Just Another Normal Day"
2014	The Strain	Brea	Episode: "Loved Ones"
2015	Blue Bloods	Faith Turner	2 episodes: "The Art of War" and "New Rules"
2015	Cooperation	Barta	Episode #1.1
2015	Elementary	Tamara	Episode: "All My Exes Live in Essex"
2015	The Good Wife	Dr. Callie Fisher	Episode: "Restraint"
2016	The Blacklist	Adoption Agent	2 episodes: "Lady Ambrosia (No. 77)" and "Alistair Pitt (No. 103)"
2017–2020	Power	Tameika Robinson / Tameika Washington	17 episodes
2019	The Code	Lt. Col. Skylar Maddox	2 episodes: "Secret Squirrel" and "1st Civ Div"
2019	High Maintenance	Wheeler	Episode: "Fingerbutt"
2019	Modern Love	Sylvia	2 episodes
2019–2020	Ray Donovan	Detective Perry	10 episodes
2020–2023	Power Book II: Ghost	Tameika Washington	13 episodes
2022	The Equalizer	Rolanda	Episode: "Legacy"
2022	Evil	Sheila Gibson	Episode: "The Demon of the End"
2022–2023	Julia	Madeline Anderson / Documentarian	2 episodes
2023	Grease: Rise of the Pink Ladies	Mrs. Robertson	2 episodes
2025	And Just Like That...	Grace	3 episodes
2025	Devil in Disguise: John Wayne Gacy	Dr. Healy	Episode: "Billy"; uncredited
2026	Furious	Nora Washington	

=== Podcasts ===
Year	Title	Role	Note
2021	Marvel's Wastelanders: Old Man Star-Lord	The Collector / Taneleer Tivan	3 episodes

=== Theatre ===
- Matt & Ben (2004) as Ben
- A Small, Melodramatic Story (2006) as O
- (I am) Nobody’s Lunch (2006) as Performer
- The Misanthrope (2007) as Éliante
- In the Next Room (or The Vibrator Play) (2009) as Elizabeth
- Ruined (2010) as Salima
- Family Week (2010) as Rickey
- born bad (2011) as Sister #1
- Red-Handed Otter (2012) as Estelle
- We Are Proud to Present a Presentation… (2012) as Black Woman
- Mr. Burns (2013) as Quincy
- Neva (2013) as Masha
- Grand Concourse (2014) as Shelly
- 10 out of 12 (2015) as Stage Manager
- The Nether (2015) as Detective Morris
- Peer Gynt (2016) as Solveig
- Small Mouth Sounds (2016) as Judy
- As You Like It (2017) as Celia
- Our Lady of 121st Street (2018) as Inez
- The Amateurs (2018) as Hollis
- Marys Seacole (2019) as Mary
- Evanston Salt Costs Climbing (2022) as Maiworm
- Doubt: A Parable (2024) as Mrs. Muller
- Well, I'll Let You Go (2025, 2026) as Maggie

== Awards and honors ==
Year	Award	Category	Title	Result	Ref.
2009	Audelco Awards	Supporting Actress	Ruined	Won	
2009	Clarence Derwent Award		Ruined	Won	
2009	Obie Award	Distinguished Performance by an Actress	Ruined	Won	
2011	Earphones Award		Pick-Up Game: A Full Day of Full Court	Won	
2011	Earphones Award		Looking Like Me	Won	
2012	Audie Award	Young Listeners' Title	Looking Like Me	Finalist	
2012	Audie Award	Young Adult Title	Pick-Up Game: A Full Day of Full Court	Finalist	
2013	Lucille Lortel Award	Outstanding Lead Actress in a Play	Neva	Nominated	
2015	Lilly Award in Acting			Won	
2015	Lucille Lortel Award	Outstanding Lead Actress in a Play	Grand Concourse	Nominated	
2018	Lucille Lortel Award	Outstanding Lead Actress in a Play	The Amateurs	Nominated	
2018	Lucille Lortel Award	Outstanding Featured Actress in a Play	As You Like It	Nominated	
2019	Lucille Lortel Award	Outstanding Lead Actress in a Play	Marys Seacole	Won	
2019	Lucille Lortel Award	Outstanding Featured Actress in a Play	Our Lady of 121st Street	Nominated	
2019	Obie Award	Sustained Excellence of Performance		Won	
2019	AudioFile	Best of Fiction, Poetry & Drama	Red at the Bone	Finalist	
2019	Earphones Award		Red at the Bone	Won	
2020	Audie Award	Literary Fiction or Classics	Red at the Bone	Nominated	
2020	Listen List		Red at the Bone	Finalist	
2024	Tony Award	Best Featured Actress in a Play	Doubt: A Parable	Nominated	
2026	Drama Desk Award	Outstanding Lead Performance in a Play	Well, I'll Let You Go	Nominated	
2026	Outer Critics Circle Award	Outstanding Lead Performer in an Off-Broadway Play	Well, I'll Let You Go	Won	
2026	Dorian Award	Outstanding Lead Performance in an Off-Broadway Production	Well, I'll Let You Go	Won	
