= Michael A. Celia =

American civil engineer

Michael A. Celia is an American retired civil engineer.

A native of Eaton, Pennsylvania, Celia graduated from Lafayette College before completing two masters degrees, a PhD, and postdoctoral research at Princeton University. Celia began his teaching career at the Massachusetts Institute of Technology, then returned to Princeton in 1989 at the invitation of Eric Franklin Wood. Celia chaired the Department of Civil and Environmental Engineering from 2005 to 2011, was elected a fellow of the American Association for the Advancement of Science in 2008, a member of the United States National Academy of Engineering in 2018, and became Theodora Shelton Pitney Professor of Environmental Studies before retiring with emeritus status in 2025.
