= François M. M. Morel =

French biogeochemist (born 1944)

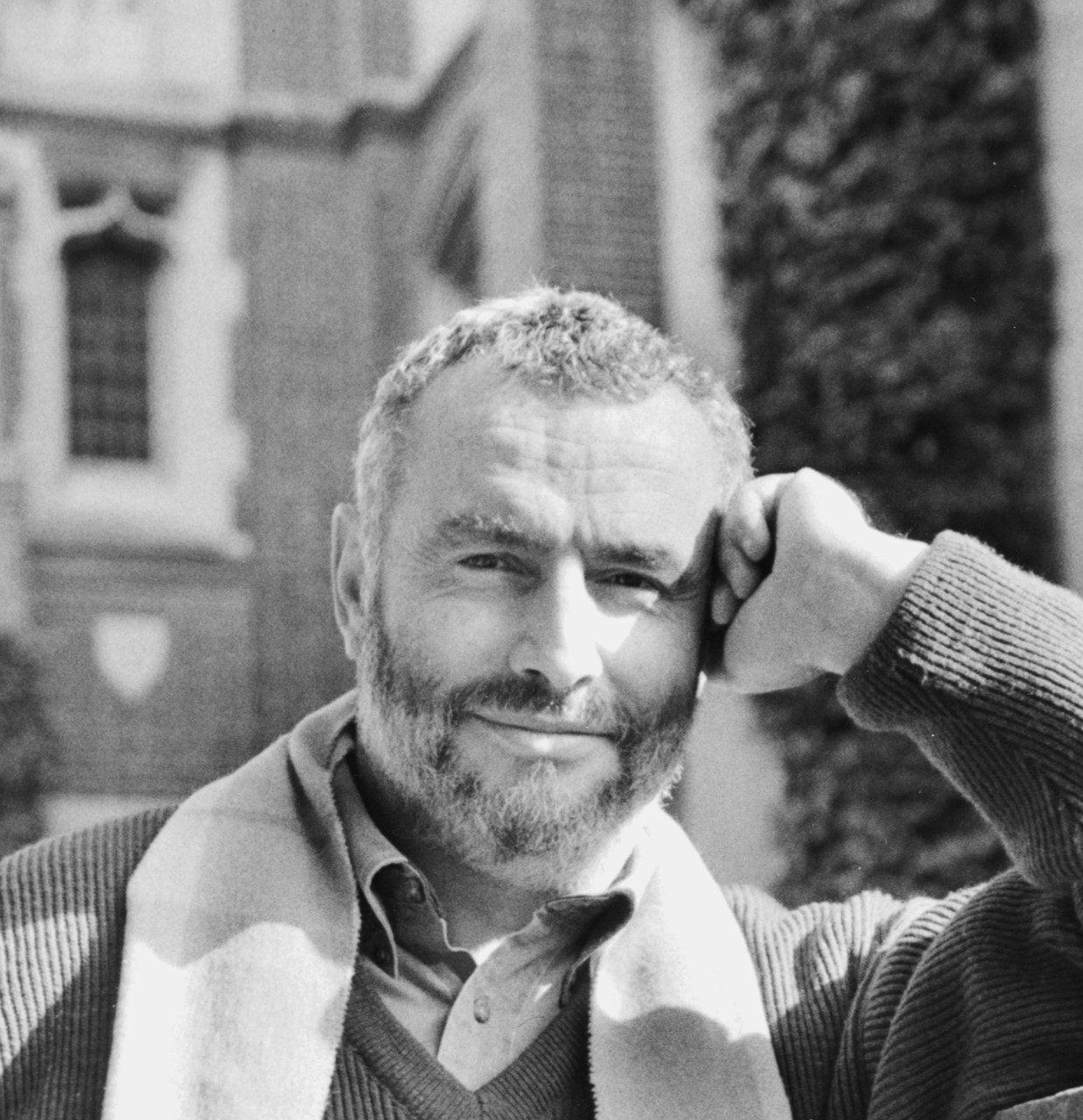
- Born: 11 October 1944 (age 82); Versailles, France
- Education: University of Grenoble, France; California Institute of Technology
- Scientific career
- Fields: Biogeochemistry
- Workplaces: Massachusetts Institute of Technology; Princeton University

François M. M. Morel (born 11 October 1944) is a French-American biogeochemist. He is known for his research on ocean acidification, mercury pollution, the only known cadmium metalloenzyme, and the interactions between trace metals and microorganisms.

== Early life and education ==
Morel grew up in Versailles, France. Morel attended the University of Grenoble, France and earned his B.S. in Applied Mathematics in 1966. He went on to earn his Diplôme d’Ingénieur the next year in 1967. In 1971, Morel obtained a Ph.D. in Engineering Sciences from California Institute of Technology.

== Research and career ==
From 1973 to 1994, Morel was a faculty member of the Massachusetts Institute of Technology's Department of Civil and Environmental Engineering, and, from 1994 to 2018, he was a professor in Princeton University's Department of Geosciences. His research and that of his students and postdoctoral researchers dealt the interactions between the chemical composition of natural waters and aquatic microorganisms. The development of computational methods to quantify the reactions among the many chemical species in aquatic systems provided the means to study quantitatively the interactions between microbes and chemical elements and compounds present in natural waters, with a focus on essential metals that are required for the growth of phytoplankton. This work encompassed the cycling and methylation of mercury, the contributions of metals to the nitrogen cycle, the use of cadmium by marine microalgae, the uptake mechanisms of iron and zinc by plankton, and the effects of ocean acidification on microorganisms.

=== REDEQL ===
As a postdoctoral fellow in Environmental Engineering Sciences from 1971 to 1973, Morel collaborated with James (Jim) J. Morgan to produce the computer program REDEQL (where RED stands for "redox" and EQL stands for "equilibrium"), which computed complex chemical equilibria in natural waters and man-made chemical systems. Morel and Morgan's creation of REDEQL was supported by the United States Environmental Protection Agency and was widely adopted and built upon.

=== Ocean acidification ===
In 2009, Morel chaired the Committee on the Development of an Integrated Science Strategy for Ocean Acidification Monitoring, Research, and Impacts Assessment. This committee published the report Ocean Acidification: A National Strategy to Meet the Challenges of a Changing Ocean, which detailed the unprecedented acidifying of the ocean's pH due to anthropogenic carbon dioxide emissions, the potential adverse impacts on marine organisms dependent on calcium carbonate, and the need for more information and international cooperation.

=== Appointments ===
Morel founded and directed the Center for Environmental BioInorganic Chemistry from 1998 to 2007. From 1998 to 2004 and from 2014 to 2017, Morel served as the director of Princeton Environmental Institute, which was later renamed to the High Meadows Environmental Institute in 2020.

=== Retirement ===
Morel retired in 2018.

== Awards and honors ==
- 1987 Paul V. Roberts/Association of Environmental Engineering & Science Professors Outstanding Doctoral Dissertation Award Advisor
- 1994 Association of Environmental Engineering & Science Professors Outstanding Publication Award Recipient
- 2000 Geochemical Society Fellow Honor Recipient
- 2001 Guggenheim Fellowship Recipient
- 2001 Geochemical Society C.C. Patterson Award Recipient
- 2005 American Geophysical Union Maurice Ewing Medal Recipient
- 2005 Elected Fellow of the American Geophysical Union
- 2009 Caltech Distinguished Alumni Award Recipient
- 2009 Elected Member of the National Academy of Sciences
- 2009 European Association of Geochemistry H.C. Urey Award Recipient
- 2010 Eni Award Recipient
- 2011 American Chemical Society Award for Creative Advances in Environmental Science and Technology Recipient
- 2011 Elected Member of the Istituto Veneto di Scienze, Lettere ed Arti
- 2012 Carnegie Mellon University Dickson Prize Recipient

== Selected publications ==
- Xu Y., L.Feng, P.D. Jeffrey, Y.G. Shi and F. M. M Morel, Structure and metal exchange in the cadmium carbonic anhydrase of marine diatoms. Nature, 452: 56–61 (2008). 10.1038/nature06636
- Hopkinson, B.M., C.L. Dupont, A.E. Allen and F. M. M. Morel. Efficiency of the CO2 concentrating mechanism of diatoms. PNAS, 108 (10) 3830–3837. (2011)
- Shaked, Y., A.B. Kustka and F. M. M. Morel. A general kinetic model for iron acquisition by eukaryotic phytoplankton. Limnology & Oceanography, 50(3): 872–882 (2005).
- Schaefer, J.K., and F. M. M. Morel. High methylation rates of mercury bound to cysteine by Geobacter sulfurreducens. Nature Geoscience. (2009)
- Shi, D., Y. Xu, B.M. Hopkinson, and F. M. M. Morel. Effect of ocean acidification on iron availability to marine phytoplankton. Science 327: 676–679 (2010)
- Price, N.M., B.A. Ahner and F. M. M. Morel. The Equatorial Pacific Ocean: grazer-controlled phytoplankton populations in an iron-limited ecosystem. Limnology & Oceanography, 39: 520–534 (1994).
- Farley, K.J., D.A. Dzombak and F. M. M. Morel. A surface precipitation model for the sorption of cations on metal oxides. J. Coll. Inter. Sci. 106:1 (1985).
- Waite, T.D. and F. M. M. Morel. Photoreductive dissolution of colloidal iron oxide: Effect of citrate. J. Coll. Inter. Sci. 102:1 (1984).
- Kraepiel, A.M.L., K. Keller, and F. M. M. Morel. A model for metal adsorption on clays. J.Colloid and Interface Science, 210: 43–54 (1999).
- Price, N.M., B.A. Ahner and F. M. M. Morel. The Equatorial Pacific Ocean: grazer-controlled phytoplankton populations in an iron-limited ecosystem. Limnology & Oceanography, 39: 520–534 (1994).
