= Rabbithole Springs =

Coordinates: 40°45′29″N 118°45′25″W

Rabbithole Springs is a spring in the U.S. state of Nevada.

Rabbithole Springs was named from the numerous wild rabbits which once congregated there. Variant names were "Rabbit Hole Spring", "Rabbit Hole Springs", "Rabbit Spring", "Rabbit Springs", and "Rabbithole Spring".
