= Gone Missing (musical) =

- Off-Broadway Premiere Recording (art by Josh Neufeld)
- Music: Michael Friedman
- Lyrics: Michael Friedman
- Book: Steve Cosson
- Basis: Interviews conducted by Damian Baldet; Trey Lyford; Jennifer Morris; Brian Sgambati; Alison Weller; Colleen Werthmann; Quincy Tyler Bernstein; Matthew Francis

Gone Missing is a 2003 musical by The Civilians, an investigative theater company in New York City. This piece of musical theatre is composed of interviews conducted by the company on the subject of loss. The play engages with individuals who have lost everything from jewelry to technology to a black Gucci pump, investigating both how things get lost, and how the impact of that loss can extend far beyond the meaning of the object itself. Gone Missing was written and directed by Steve Cosson from interviews by the company, with music and lyrics by Michael Friedman, with additional text for “Interview with Dr. Palinurus” by Peter Morris. Gone Missing made its Canadian premiere on May 12, 2011 by Southpointe Academy in British Columbia.

== Conception ==
Gone Missing began with interviews about things that were lost and never found. The show does not answer any questions or purport theories about loss but rather presents a wide variety of human stories and emotions through this specific type of common experience. When writing about what impact he wanted to have with Gone Missing, stage director and writer Steve Cosson said

“I wanted to learn if the mechanics of loss and grief were significantly different in other people. Or do we instead all just have different names and objects tagged to the various holes in hearts, with the nature of the holes themselves being more or less the same? And is there a way that we as a society remember lost things can tell us something about how we live now? Could these holes somehow make a map of absences that would describe the territory that encompasses both ‘all there is’ and ‘all that might have been?’”

== Process ==
The Civilians use documentary methods to create theater pieces. Like many of The Civilians' productions, Gone Missing is based on interviews with individuals conducted by the cast. The company did not record the interviews, and the actors did not write them down until after the interview was over. Indeed, Dan Balcazo notes in his Theatermania review of "Gone Missing", "Certain sections appear to be verbatim transcripts of interviews, while others seem more fictionalized, or at the very least exaggerated for comic effect". This variegated effect is a trademark of The Civilians' style which incorporates the subjective, the ambiguous, and the unexpected.

== The Play ==
Gone Missing uses the transcripts from the interviews as verbatim dialogue. The bits of dialog are juxtaposed to bring out similarities and highlight differences in the things people lose and how they deal with them. For example, several interviewees talk about rings that they have lost, and these excerpts woven together in one scene. Other voices included are that of a pet psychic, a Disposeaphobic, a social worker, and a police man who finds lost body parts. Other topics that the overarching subject raises include that of Atlantis, and how it was considered by Plato to be a kind of lost paradise, and Sigmund Freud's theory about subconscious intentional misplacing of objects.

== Production history ==
Gone Missing had its world premiere at The Belt Theatre in New York City in October 2003. The piece then moved to The Gate Theatre, London, England in the spring of 2004, after which it traveled to St. Ann's Warehouse in New York City in 2005 and The Actors Theatre of Louisville in Kentucky in 2006. Gone Missing then returned to New York City and had its Off Broadway premiere on June 24, 2007 at The Barrow Street Theatre. The Barrow Street production was produced by Scott Morfee and Tom Wirtshafter. Gone Missing has also toured to several presenting institutions throughout the East Coast. Gone Missing's Canadian premiere was performed by Southpointe Academy in 2011.

In early 2012, Hope College's (Holland, Mich.) production of "Gone Missing" was selected for the Kennedy Center American College Theatre Festival Region 3. The show premiered and closed on January 6, 2012 to two near-capacity auditoriums at the Colwell Playhouse Theatre at the University of Illinois-Champaign-Urbana. The production was directed by Dr. Daina Robins, theatre professor at Hope College. The production received high praise from two American College Theatre Festival responders and highlighted such things as choreography (Skye Edwards) and dialect work.

== Public response and recognition ==
In addition to favorable reviews in such publications as The New York Times and Variety, Gone Missing was included in numerous “best of” lists in 2007, including Charles Isherwood's Top Ten of 2007 list and Joe Dziemianowicz of The New York Daily News’ “Hot or Not” column for 2007. The popularity of the show led to an extension beyond its original run of six weeks, finally closing on January 6 of 2008.

== Cast ==
World Premiere: Damian Baldet, Maria Dizzia, Michael Esper, Trey Lyford, Jennifer R. Morris, Alison Weller

Off-Broadway Premiere: Emily Ackerman, Damian Baldet, Jennifer R. Morris, Stephen Plunkett, Robbie Collier Sublett, Colleen Werthmann

Hope College: Skye Edwards, Jesse Swatling-Holcomb, Christine Worden, Molly Coyle, Kelsey Cratty, Erik Durham, Aiden deJong, Jenny Tremblay, Bradley Hamilton, Kaija vonWebsky, Katie Colburn, Jackie Richards

== Song list ==
- Things I Have Lost
- Gone Missing
- The Only Thing Missing
- La Bodega
- Hide & Seek
- I Gave It Away
- Ich Traumt Du Kamst An Mich
- Lost Horizon
- Etch A Sketch
- Stars
- "Lost Horizon"
