= Rabbit Hole Ensemble =

Not-for-profit, Off-off Broadway theatre company

- Address: Brooklyn, New York; United States
- Type: Off-Broadway

Website
- rabbitholeensemble.com

Rabbit Hole Ensemble is a Brooklyn, New York, United States based, not-for-profit, Off-off Broadway theatre company. Under the artistic direction of Edward Elefterion, the ensemble has produced seven original works throughout Brooklyn and Manhattan.

The ensemble uses stories, told simply and theatrically, without much technology.

== Aesthetic ==
“If it isn't absolutely necessary, get rid of it.”

Rabbit Hole eschews technology in favor of the imaginations of performers and audience. Productions are stripped-down affairs in which the actors create everything onstage, often providing music and sound effects, as well as lighting with hand-held clip lights. Sets, costumes, and props are as simple as possible. By depending on the actors to communicate everything, the ensemble develops a relationship with audience members, who complete the onstage images in their own imaginations.

== Techniques ==
The company's emphasis on a minimalist aesthetic results in works that are light on technical spectacle, creating the world of the play largely through actor-generated movement and sound. In The Siblings, an early RH production, this concept worked hand-in-hand with the existentialist material. The play had the feel of a work from the Theatre of the Absurd, focusing on a lack of meaning in a cruel, godless universe, but without that genre's suspension of a linear narrative. The Transformation of Dr. Jekyll, on the other hand, maintained many of the existential questions while taking the approach of a collage-style work, using everything from traditional dramatic conflict to puppetry in order to convey the story.

The focus of Rabbit Hole's four successive works based on Bram Stoker's novel, Dracula, and F.W. Murnau's silent film, Nosferatu, was a consideration of storytelling. In these productions, the company created and developed storytelling techniques that utilized the ensemble as a composer of atmosphere. Actor-produced lighting and sound created the impression of such settings as ships’ holds and forests (without the use of set pieces), and the characterization of non-human entities such as horses to fog created environments which supported the action of the productions.

The production, A Rope in the Abyss, was both realistic and surrealistic simultaneously, with the characters of the play based in a world with a fourth wall. Like the work of Grotowski, the impulse behind the production was to use the false reality of the theatre to face its audience with the intense, and often grim, realities of the world in which they live.

The company's 2008 production, Big Thick Rod, addressed the theme of exploitation. The play contains a combination of linguistic and slapstick humor, much in the vein of the Theatre of the Ridiculous plays of Charles Ludlam. Big Thick Rod, by Resident Playwright Stanton Wood, premiered in the New York International Fringe Festival, in August 2008. In 2009. Rabbit Hole Ensemble presented Shadow of Himself, by Obie Award-winning playwright Neal Bell. Stanton Wood's Candide Americana will be presented at FringeNYC in August, 2009.

== Support ==
Rabbit Hole Ensemble is a 501(c)(3) non-profit company that relies on donations from supporters. The company is a member of the Alliance of Resident Theatres/New York, and receives production assistance from The Puffin Foundation, Brooklyn Arts Council, The Nancy Quinn Fund, The Edith Lutyens and Norman Bel Geddes Foundation, New York Theatre Workshop, New York University, Urban Stages, and Sun Microsystems.

== Works ==
- 2005 – The Transformation of Dr. Jekyll (also 2006; New York International Fringe Festival)
- 2006 – The Siblings (Midtown International Theatre Festival)
- 2006 – Nosferatu: Part I
- 2007 – The Land of the Undead
- 2007 – Nosferatu: The Morning of My Death (Midtown International Theatre Festival)
- 2007 – The Night of Nosferatu (picked up from its Manhattan run by Wellfleet Harbor Actors Theatre; Wellfleet, MA)
- 2008 – A Rope in the Abyss
- 2008 - Big Thick Rod (picked up from its FringeNYC run by The Access Theater Spotlight Series)
- 2009 - Shadow of Himself (by Obie-winner Neal Bell)
- 2009 - Candide Americana

== Awards and honors ==
- 2008 - Outstanding Direction: Edward Elefterion, New York Innovative Theatre Award
- 2008 - Outstanding Lighting Design: Kevin Hardy, New York Innovative Theatre Award

For The Night of Nosferatu

- 2008 - Nominated, New York Innovative Theatre Awards:

Outstanding Overall Production of a Play
Outstanding Full Length Script: Stanton Wood
Outstanding Featured Actress: Tatiana Gomberg
Outstanding Ensemble: Danny Ashkenasi, Matt W. Cody, Paul Daily, Tatiana Gomberg, Emily Hartford, Ned Massey

For The Night of Nosferatu

- 2007 – “Top 10 of 2007,” Popshifter.com: The Night of Nosferatu
- 2007 – “Best Cape Theatre 2007,” Cape Cod Times: The Night of Nosferatu
- 2006 – Outstanding Direction: Edward Elefterion, Midtown International Theatre Festival “Best of the Fest Award”

For Nosferatu: The Morning of My Death

- 2006 – Nominated, Midtown International Theatre Festival “Best of the Fest Awards”

Outstanding Overall Production of a New Play
Outstanding Ensemble: Danny Ashkenasi, Matt W. Cody, Paul Daily, Emily Hartford, Jenna Kalinowski, David Miceli
Outstanding Lead Actress: Jenna Kalinowski
Outstanding Lighting Design: Edward Elefterion

For Nosferatu: The Morning of My Death

== Community ==
In the spring of 2008, Rabbit Hole Ensemble founded an initiative to bring theatre to underserved communities. With the original production, A Rope in the Abyss, as its cornerstone, the project brought free performances to sites throughout Brooklyn, NY, including homeless shelters, assisted living facilities, and hospitals. A Rope in the Abyss, a new play about neuroscience, brain injury, and the tenuous nature of identity, was presented in partnership with the Brain Injury Association of New York State. The project brought together hundreds of Brooklyn residents across five neighborhoods, and will be continued annually, with a new show each year, as part of Rabbit Hole Ensemble's season.
