= This Beautiful City (play) =

- Off-Broadway poster art
- Music: Michael Friedman
- Lyrics: Michael Friedman
- Book: Steve Cosson and Jim Lewis
- Premiere: March 2008: Humana Festival of New American Plays; Actors Theatre of Louisville; Louisville, Kentucky
- Productions: 2009 Off-Broadway

This Beautiful City is a play with music by the investigative theatre company The Civilians. The play engages with "the expansion of the Evangelical movement in Colorado Springs" and the gulf between the Evangelical and secular communities in the region, against the background of the Ted Haggard sex scandal. It was written by Steve Cosson and Jim Lewis from interviews conducted by Associate Artists Emily Ackerman, Marsha Stephanie Blake, Brad Heberlee, Brandon Miller, Stephen Plunkett, and Alison Weller, with music and lyrics by Michael Friedman, and directed by Steve Cosson. The play first opened in March 2008 at the Actors Theatre of Louisville Humana Festival of New American Plays, followed by successful runs at Studio Theatre in Washington, D.C., and the Center Theatre Group in Los Angeles, California. The piece premiered in New York City in the winter of 2009 at the Vineyard Theatre. This Beautiful City was nominated for Drama Desk, Drama League, and Lucille Lortel Awards

== Conception ==
When asked why he had become interested in this topic, Artistic Director Steve Cosson said "one of the things I wanted to do was to go work on a subject that was very different from us in our company and one of the first ideas was to do something about conservative Christianity. After the 2004 election, the subject seemed more and more important and our company had grown and had more resources, so it seemed like the time had come… And there's no better place to do this project than Colorado Springs because of New Life, Ted and his relationship to politics, his presidency of the NAE during the Bush Presidency … Three of us came out in June and went to New Life and I think the first time we really sort of got it, like "Oh! this really seems to be the center of America right now. I mean, you're in the middle of this church with 7,000 people and the minister is talking about his relationship to George Bush and Ariel Sharon and other world leaders. I think the world we come from knows that the evangelical movement is this big influential thing in politics, but they don't really have an understanding of the scope of it or what it means, or what that kind of Christianity really means, or what it is beyond its political effect on the national elections. And other than that they find it kind of scary and freaky."

== Format ==
Rather than focusing on a specific narrative, This Beautiful City instead endeavors to illuminate the thoughts of the "dozens of characters—conservative Christians, secular progressives, city employees and a Celtic Wiccan—all vying to describe the place of religion in their community." A narrative structure is built around the discovery and progression of the Ted Haggard scandal, the news of which broke during the research period for the show.

== New York performance history ==
This Beautiful City had its New York premiere at the Vineyard Theatre, with previews beginning on February 3, 2009, opening on February 22, 2009, and running to March 15, 2009. At one notable performance, Ted Haggard, whose homosexual relationship and methamphetamine scandal was depicted in the play, was a member of the audience along with his wife, Gayle, and filmmaker Alexandra Pelosi and her husband.

== Awards ==
- 2009 Lucille Lortel Award Nomination for Outstanding Musical
- 2009 Drama League Award Nomination for Distinguished Production of a Musical
- 2009 Henry Hewes Design Award Nominations for Scenic Design (Neil Patel) and Lighting Design (David Weiner)
- 2011 Richmond Theater Critics Circle Award Nominations for Best Musical, Best Director, Best Musical Director, Best Supporting Actor, Best Supporting Actress (2), Best Ensemble (Richmond Triangle Players)
