= High Meadows Environmental Institute =

Research institute at Princeton University

- Founded: 1994 (32 years ago)
- Type: Think tank
- Purpose: Environment, Climate change
- Location: Princeton, New Jersey
- Region served: Global
- Director: Gabriel Vecchi
- Parent organization: Princeton University
- Website: environment.princeton.edu
- Formerly called: Princeton Environmental Institute

High Meadows Environmental Institute (HMEI, formerly the Princeton Environmental Institute, PEI) at Princeton University in Princeton, New Jersey is an interdisciplinary center for environmental research that studies effects of and solutions to climate change and other environmental threats. The International Center for Climate Governance named the Princeton Environmental Institute the second-highest climate change think tank in the global category for 2012, following the Belfer Center for Science and International Affairs.

The High Meadows Environmental Institute is an interdisciplinary center for environmental research that includes over 120 researchers from 29 departments. Researchers study the causes and impacts of climate change and other key environmental issues involving energy, food, water, and biodiversity. Long-term projects include the Carbon Mitigation Initiative, the Center for Biocomplexity, and the Integrated Ground Water Modeling Center. Grand Challenges and other initiatives focus on climate change and infectious disease, food and the environment, ecohydrology, urban resilience, and sustainable development.

== History ==
The Princeton Environmental Institute was founded in 1994 as part of a broader initiative led by university president Harold T. Shapiro, to make Princeton a center for addressing global environmental challenges. Shapiro met with Tom Barron, Robert H. Socolow and Henry S. Horn in 1992 to discuss the university's possible direction. Shapiro then formed a faculty committee which recommended the creation of the Princeton Environmental Institute. In December 1995, the Institute moved into the newly-renovated Guyot Hall.

The founding director of the institute in 1994 was Simon Levin. François M. M. Morel held the position of Director twice, first between 1998 and 2004. Ignacio Rodríguez-Iturbe, who served as acting director of the institute in 2002, founded the field of ecohydrology. Stephen W. Pacala was Acting Director of the Princeton Environmental Institute from 2005 to 2006, and Director from 2006 to 2014. François M. M. Morel returned for a second time as Director from 2014-2017. The Director of the institute from 2017-2021 was Michael A. Celia, the Theodora Shelton Pitney Professor of Environmental Studies and professor of civil and environmental engineering at Princeton. As of July 2021, the Director became Gabriel Vecchi.

In 2000, the institute established the Carbon Mitigation Initiative (CMI) in partnership with BP. The Carbon Mitigation Initiative has identified eight major carbon mitigation strategies or "wedges" for reducing human-based carbon emissions.

In 2014, with funding from the National Science Foundation (NSF), the institute established the Southern Ocean Carbon and Climate Observations and Modeling project (SOCCOM), to study the Southern Ocean's role in climate regulation.

In 2019, the institute received $2.5 million in federal funding to study resilience and sustainability in urban food systems.

In 2020, the Institute received a gift to create the Thomas A. and Currie C. Barron Family Biodiversity Research Challenge Fund to support research on the preservation of species and ecosystems.

The Princeton Environmental Institute was renamed as the High Meadows Environmental Institute, following a gift from Judy and Carl Ferenbach III's High Meadows Foundation in 2020. The High Meadows Environmental Institute (HMEI) is projected to move to a new building at Princeton in early 2025.
