= Anne Washburn =

American playwright

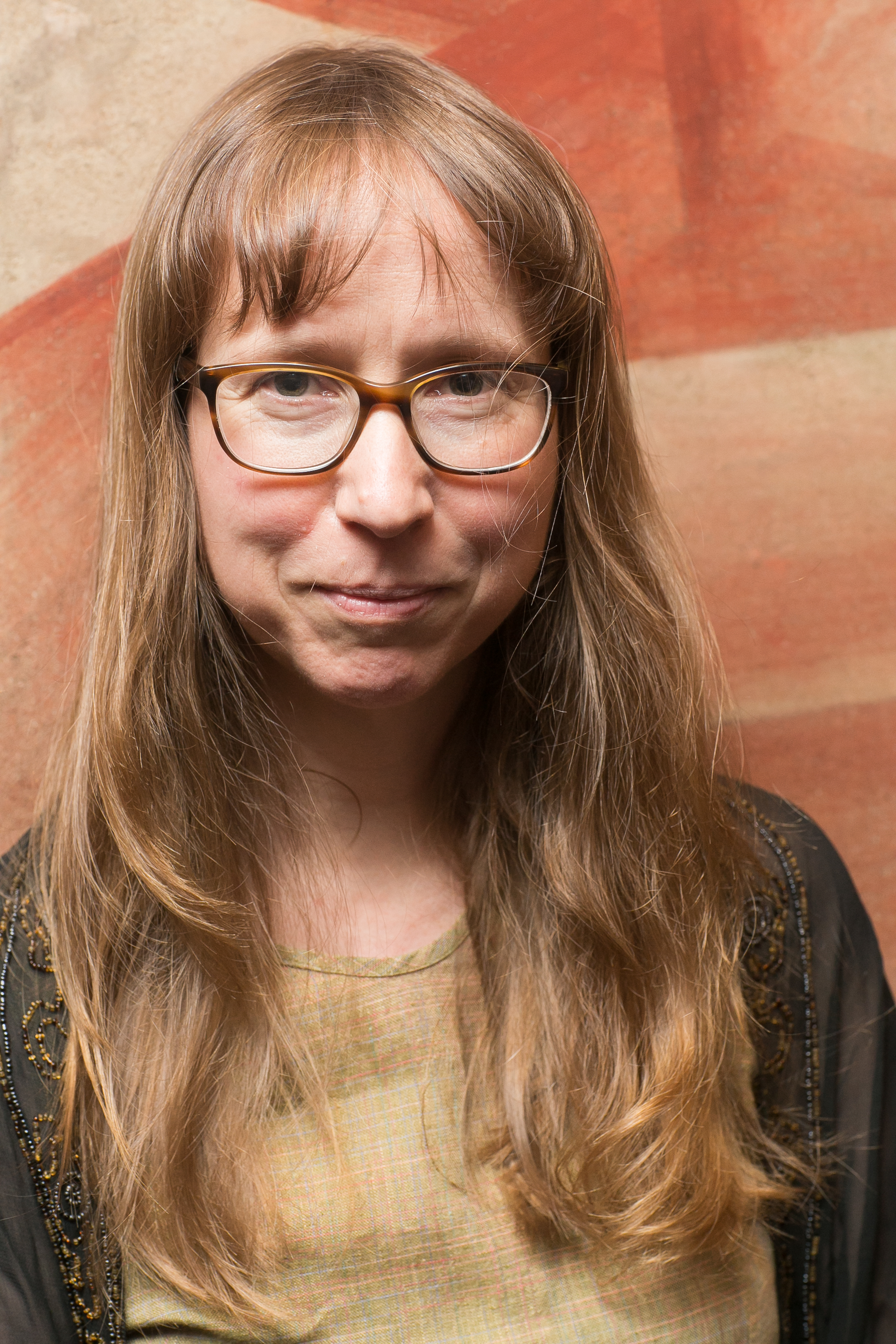
- Born: 1969 (age 56–57); Berkeley, California, U.S.
- Education: Reed College (BA); New York University (MFA)
- Occupation: Playwright
- Spouse: Gordon Dahlquist
- Writing career
- Notable work: Mr. Burns, a Post-Electric Play
- Notable awards: Guggenheim Fellowship (2007); Whiting Award (2015); PEN/Laura Pels Theater Award (2015); Susan Smith Blackburn Prize, Finalist (2020)

Anne Washburn is an American playwright.

== Life ==
Washburn graduated from Reed College and from New York University, with an M.F.A.

Her plays have been produced in New York City by Cherry Lane Theatre, Clubbed Thumb, The Civilians, Vineyard Theatre, Dixon Place, and Soho Repertory Theatre—and elsewhere by American Repertory Theater, Woolly Mammoth Theatre Company, New Jersey's Two River Theater Company, Washington DC's Studio Theater, and London's Gate Theatre and Almeida Theatre.

Her 2012 play Mr. Burns, a Post-Electric Play received a Drama League Award nomination for Outstanding Production and was praised by The New York Times as "downright brilliant." Her play A Devil at Noon was featured at the 2011 Humana Festival of New American Plays and the play Sleep Rock Thy Brain—written with Rinne Groff and Lucas Hnath—was featured at the 2013 Festival. In 2015, 10 Out of 12 played at the Soho Rep theater.

Washburn is a member of 13P, an associated artist with The Civilians and New Georges, and an alumna of New Dramatists. Her work has been published in American Theatre magazine.

== Awards and honors ==
- 2007 Guggenheim fellowship
- 2015 Whiting Award
- 2015 PEN/Laura Pels Theater Award, American Playwright in Mid-Career
- 2016 Herb Alpert Award in the Arts in Theatre

== Plays ==
- 2026 Anon
- 2025 The Burning Cauldron of Fiery Fire
- 2019 Shipwreck
- 2018 Little Bunny Foo Foo
- 2017 The Twilight Zone
- 2016 Antlia Pneumatica
- 2015 Iphigenia in Aulis, a transadaptation, based on Euripides' Iphigenia in Aulis
- 2015 10 Out of 12
- 2012 Mr. Burns, a Post-Electric Play
- 2011 A Devil at Noon
- 2010 The Small
- 2010 Orestes, a transadaptation, based on Euripides' Orestes
- 2008 October/November
- 2006 I Have Loved Strangers
- 2004 The Internationalist
- 2004 The Ladies
- 2003 Apparition
- 2001 The Communist Dracula Pageant
- 1999 Everything Not Forbidden Is Permitted (Or Vice Versa)
- 1998 Refreshment of the Spirit
