= Humana Festival of New American Plays =

Theater festival in Kentucky (1976–2021)

- Genre: Theatre festival
- Locations: Actors Theatre of Louisville; Louisville, Kentucky
- Years active: 1976–2021
- Founded: 1976
- Founder: Jon Jory
- Patron: Humana Foundation
- Organiser: Actors Theatre of Louisville
- Website: actorstheatre.org/humana-festival-of-new-american-plays/

The Humana Festival of New American Plays was an influential festival celebrating the contemporary American playwright. Produced annually at the Actors Theatre of Louisville, the festival showcased new theatrical works and drew producers, critics, playwrights, and theatre lovers from around the world. The festival was founded in 1976 by Jon Jory, then the Producing Director of Actors Theatre. Since 1979 The Humana Festival was sponsored by the Humana Foundation which is the philanthropic arm of Humana. The festival shut down permanently in 2022; the final festival took place in 2021.

== History ==
The Actors Theater of Louisville hosted the first Festival of New American Plays in March 1977. It was founded by the former artistic director of the Actors Theater, Jon Jory. The Gin Game by D.L. Coburn, one of the plays presented that year, went on to open on Broadway later that year and would win the Pulitzer Prize for Drama in 1978. The 1978 festival line up included Marsha Norman's Getting Out, and in 1979, Crimes of the Heart by Beth Henley. It was also the first year that the festival was sponsored by the Humana Festival.

Over the 400 plays (short pieces, ten-minute plays, one-acts, and full-lengths) the festival has produced, many have gone on to win several awards. Dinner With Friends by Donald Margulies, Coburn's The Gin Game, and Henley's Crimes of the Heart have all won the Pulitzer Prize for Drama. Keely and Du by Jane Martin, Becky Shaw by Gina Gionfriddo, and Omnium-Gatherum by Alexandra Gersten-Vassilaros and Theresa Rebeck have all been finalists for the prize.

Lucas Hnath's The Christians, Appropriate by Branden Jacobs-Jenkins, Big Love by Charles Mee, Slavs! by Tony Kushner, My Left Breast by Susan Miller, Marisol by José Rivera and One Flea Spare by Naomi Wallace have all won Obie Awards.

How to Say Goodbye by Mary Gallagher, My Sister in this House by Wendy Kesselman, A Narrow Bed by Ellen McLaughlin, My Left Breast by Susan Miller and One Flea Spare by Naomi Wallace have won the Susan Smith Blackburn Prize, and nine other plays produced at the festival have been finalists.

2 by Romulus Linney, Dinner with Friends by Donald Margulies, Getting Out by Marsha Norman, and Jane Martin's Talking With…, Keely and Du, Jack and Jill, and Anton in Show Business have won the Steinberg/American Theatre Critics Association New Play Award, and Dinner with Friends by Donald Margulies, Big Love by Charles Mee, After Ashley by Gina Gionfriddo, Great Falls by Lee Blessing, Edith Can Shoot Things and Hit Them by A.Rey Pamatmat, and Lucas Hnath's Death Tax and The Christians have won Steinberg/American Theatre Critics Association New Play Award Citations.

Jeff Augustin's and Peter Sinn Nachtrieb' s plays, Cry Old Kingdom and BOB: A Life in Five Acts respectively, have won the Barrie and Bernice Stavis Award, given by the National Theatre Conference to outstanding emerging playwrights.

The festival came to an end when the Humana Foundation withdrew its funding.

== List of plays produced ==
List of plays from 1976 to 2008

2008

- Great Falls by Lee Blessing
- Becky Shaw by Gina Gionfriddo
- This Beautiful City by Steven Cosson and Jim Lewis, with music and lyrics by Michael Friedman
- the break/s by Marc Bamuthi Joseph
- All Hail Hurricane Gordo by Carly Mensch
- Neighborhood 3: Requisition of Doom by Jennifer Haley
- Game On by Zakiyyah Alexander, Rolin Jones, Alice Tuan, Daryl Watson, Marisa Wegrzyn and Ken Weitzman, with music and lyrics by Jon Spurney
- Tongue, Tied by M. Thomas Cooper
- Dead Right by Elaine Jarvik
- In Paris You Will Find Many Baguettes but Only One True Love by Michael Lew
- One Short Sleepe by Naomi Wallace

2007

- 365 Days/365 Plays by Suzan-Lori Parks
- The As If Body Loop by Ken Weitzman
- Batch: An American Bachelor/Ette Party Spectacle, conceived by Whit MacLaughlin & Alice Tuan With Text by Alice Tuan Created by New Paradise Laboratories
- Clarisse and Larmon by Deb Margolin
- Dark Play or Stories for Boys by Carlos Murillo
- I Am Not Batman by Marco Ramirez
- Mr. and Mrs. by Julie Marie Myatt
- The Open Road Anthology by Constance Congdon, Kia Corthron, Michael John Garcés, Rolin Jones, A. Rey Pamatmat, Kathryn Walat with music by GrooveLily
- Strike-Slip by Naomi Iizuka
- The Unseen by Craig Wright
- When Something Wonderful Ends by Sherry Kramer

2006

- Act a Lady by Jordan Harrison
- Hotel Cassiopeia by Charles L. Mee, produced in association with the SITI Company
- Listeners by Jane Martin
- Low's Journey: Mediations Trilogy, pt. I by Rha Goddess, a co-production of Divine Dime, Ltd. and Made in da Shade
- Natural Selection by Eric Coble
- Neon Mirage by Liz Duffy Adams, Dan Dietz, Rick Hip-Flores, Julie Jensen, Lisa Kron, Tracey Scott Wilson & Chay Yew
- Six Years by Sharr White
- The Scene by Theresa Rebeck
- Sovereignty by Rolin Jones
- Three Guys and a Brenda by Adam Bock

2005

- Dream of Jeanie-by-the-Door by David Valdes Greenwood
- Goody Fucking Two Shoes by Jennifer Maisel
- Hazzard County by Allison Moore
- Johannes, Pyotr & Marge by Jeffrey Essmann
- Long Dream in Summer by Saïd Sayrafiezadeh
- Memory House by Kathleen Tolan
- Moot the Messenger by Kia Corthron
- A Nervous Smile by John Belluso
- Pure Confidence by Carlyle Brown
- The Shaker Chair by Adam Bock
- Uncle Sam's Satiric Spectacular: On Democracy and Other Fictions, Featuring Patriotism Acts and Blue Songs from a Red State by Greg Allen, Sheila Callaghan, Bridget Carpenter, Eric Coble, Richard Dresser, Michael Friedman and Hilly Hicks

2004

- After Ashley by Gina Gionfriddo
- At the Vanishing Point by Naomi Iizuka
- A Bone Close to My Brain by Dan Dietz
- Foul Territory by Craig Wright
- Kid-Simple by Jordan Harrison
- Kuwait by Vincent Delaney
- The Ruby Sunrise by Rinne Groff
- Sans-Culottes in the Promised Land by Kirsten Greenidge
- The Spot by Steven Dietz
- Tallgrass Gothic by Melanie Marnich
- Fast and Loose: An Ethical Collaboration by José Cruz González, Kirsten Greenidge, Julie Marie Myatt and John Walch

2003

- The Faculty Room by Bridget Carpenter
- Fit for Feet by Jordan Harrison
- The Lively Lad songs by Quincy Long, music by Michael Silversher
- Omnium Gatherum by Alexandra Gersten-Vassilaros and Theresa Rebeck
- Orange Lemon Egg Canary: A Trick In Four Acts by Rinne Groff
- The Roads That Lead Here by Lee Blessing
- The Second Death of Priscilla by Russell Davis
- Slide Glide the Slippery Slope by Kia Corthron
- Trash Anthem by Dan Dietz
- Trepidation Nation: A Phobic Anthology by Keith Josef Adkins, Stephen Belber, Hilary Bell, Glen Berger, Sheila Callaghan, Bridget Carpenter, Cusi Cram, Richard Dresser, Erik Ehn, Gina Gionfriddo, Kirsten Greenidge, Michael Hollinger, Warren Leight, Julie Marie Myatt, Victoria Stewart, and James Still
- Rhythmicity by UNIVERSES (Steven Sapp; Mildred Ruiz-Sapp; Gamal Abdel Chasten; and special guest collaborators: Reg.e.ganes; Willie Perdomo; Rha Goddess; Reggie Cabico)

2002

- A.M. Sunday by Jerome Hairston
- Bake Off by Sheri Wilner
- Classyass by Caleen Sinnette Jennings
- Finer Noble Gases by Adam Rapp
- Limonade Tous Les Jours by Charles L. Mee
- The Mystery of Attraction by Marlane Meyer
- Nightswim by Julia Jordan
- Rembrandt's Gift by Tina Howe
- Score conceived and directed by Anne Bogart, adapted by Jocelyn Clarke
- Snapshot: A Dramatic Anthology by Tanya Barfield, Lee Blessing, Julie Jensen, Honor Molloy, Sunil Kuruvilla, David Lindsay-Abaire, Michael Bigelow Dixon & Val Smith, Victor Lodato, Quincy Long, Deb Margolin, Allison Moore, Lynn Nottage, Dan O'Brien, Annie Weisman, Craig Wright, and Chay Yew
- The Technology Project
- Voice Properties (On A First Date After a Full Year of Februarys) by John Belluso
- F.E.T.C.H. by Alice Tuan
- Virtual Mediation #1 by Sarah Ruhl

2001

- bobrauschenbergamerica by Charles L. Mee
- Description Beggared; or the Allegory of WHITENESS by Mac Wellman, music by Michael Roth
- Flaming Guins of the Purple Sage by Jane Martin
- Quake by Melanie Marnich
- Heaven and Hell (On Earth): A Divine Comedy by Robert Alexander, Jenny Lyn Bader, Elizabeth Dewberry, Deborah Lynn Frockt, Rebecca Gilman, Keith Glover, Hilly Hicks Jr., Karen Hines, Michael Kassin, Jane Martin, William Mastrosimone, Guillermo Reyes, Sarah Schulman, Richard Strand, Alice Tuan & Elizabeth Wong
- When The Sea Drowns in Sand (retitled: Havana is Waiting) by Eduardo Machado
- Wonderful World by Richard Dresser
- Chad Curtiss, Lost Again by Arthur Kopit

The Phone Plays

- Subliminable by Greg Allen (The Neo-Futurists, Chicago)
- Hype-R-Connectivity by Andy Bayiates (The Neo-Futurists, Chicago)
- Call Waiting by Rachel Claff (The Neo-Futurists, Chicago)
- Owls by Erin Courtney (Clubbed Thumb, New York)
- Message Sent by Sterling Houston (Jump-Start Performance Co., San Antonio)
- Click by Brighde Mullins (Thick Description, San Francisco)
- Somebody Call 911 by Jennifer L. Nelson (African Continuum Theatre Company, Washington, D.C.)

2000

- Anton in Show Business by Jane Martin
- Arabian Nights by David Ives
- Big Love by Charles L. Mee
- The Divine Fallacy by Tina Howe
- No. 11 (Blue and White) by Alexandra Cunningham
- Standard Time by Naomi Wallace
- TAPE by Stephen Belber
- Touch by Toni Press-Coffman
- War of the Worlds by Naomi Iizuka

Phone Plays

- Beside Every Good Man by Regina Taylor
- Lovers of Long Red Hair by José Rivera
- The Reprimand by Jane Anderson
- Show Business by Jeffrey Hatcher
- Trespassion by Mark O'Donnell

1999

- Aloha, Say the Pretty Girls by Naomi Iizuka
- Cabin Pressure by Anne Bogart & The SITI Company
- What Are You Afraid Of? by Richard Dresser
- The Cockfighter by Frank Manley, adapted by Vincent Murphy
- God's Man in Texas by David Rambo
- The T(ext) Shirt Project
- Y2K (retitled: BecauseHeCan) by Arthur Kopit
- Life Under 30 — A Bill of 10-Minute Plays
  - Slop-Culture by Robb Badlam
  - The Blue Room by Courtney Baron
  - Dancing With a Devil by Brooke Berman
  - Forty Minute Finish by Jerome Hairston
  - Mpls., St. Paul by Julia Jordan
  - Drive Angry by Matt Pelfrey
  - Labor Day by Sheri Wilner
  - Just Be Frank by Caroline Williams

1998

- Acorn by David Graziano
- Dinner With Friends by Donald Margulies
- Let the Big Dog Eat by Elizabeth Wong
- Like Totally Weird by William Mastrosimone
- Meow by Val Smith
- Mr. Bundy by Jane Martin
- Resident Alien by Stuart Spencer
- Ti Jean Blues, adapted from the works of Jack Kerouac by JoAnne Akalaitis
- The Trestle at Pope Lick Creek by Naomi Wallace

1997

- Gun-Shy by Richard Dresser
- Icarus by Edwin Sanchez
- In Her Sight by Carol K. Mack
- Lighting Up the Two-Year Old by Benjie Aerenson
- Misreadings by Neena Beber
- Polaroid Stories by Naomi Iizuka
- Private Eyes by Steven Dietz
- Stars by Romulus Linney
- Waterbabies by Adam LeFevre

1996

- The Batting Cage by Joan Ackermann
- Chilean Holiday by Guillermo Reyes
- Contract With Jackie by Jimmy Breslin
- Flesh and Blood by Elizabeth Dewberry
- Going, Going, Gone by Anne Bogart & the SITI Company
- Jack and Jill by Jane Martin
- Missing/Kissing by John Patrick Shanley
- One Flea Spare by Naomi Wallace
- Reverse Transcription: Six Playwrights Bury a Seventh by Tony Kushner
- Trying to Find Chinatown by David Henry Hwang
- What I Meant Was by Craig Lucas

1995

- Below the Belt by Richard Dresser
- Beast on the Moon by Richard Kalinoski
- Between the Lines by Regina Taylor
- Cloud Tectonics by José Rivera
- Head On by Elizabeth Dewberry
- Helen at Risk by Dana Yeaton
- July 7, 1994 by Donald Margulies
- Middle-Aged White Guys by Jane Martin
- Tough Choices for the New Century: A Seminar for Responsible Living by Jane Anderson
- Trudy Blue by Marsha Norman
- Your Obituary is a Dance by Benard Cummings

1994

- 1969 by Tina Landau
- Betty the Yeti by Jon Klein
- Julie Johnson by Wendy Hammond
- The Last Time We Saw Her by Jane Anderson
- My Left Breast by Susan Miller
- Slavs! (Thinking About the Longstanding Problems of Virtue and Happiness) by Tony Kushner
- Shotgun by Romulus Linney
- Stones and Bones by Marion McClinton
- The Survivor: A Cambodian Odyssey by Jon Lipsky
- Trip's Cinch by Phyllis Nagy

1993

- Deadly Virtues by Brian Jucha
- The ice Fishing Play by Kevin Kling
- Keely and Du by Jane Martin
- Poof! by Lynn Nottage
- Shooting Simone by Lynne Kaufman
- Stanton's Garage by Joan Ackermann
- Tape by José Rivera
- What We Do With it by Bruce MacDonald
- Watermelon Rinds by Regina Taylor

1992

- Bondage by David Henry Hwang
- The Carving of Mount Rushmore by John Conklin
- D. Boone (retitled: Loving Daniel Boone) by Marsha Norman
- Devotees in the Garden of Love by Suzan-Lori Parks
- Eukiah by Lanford Wilson
- Evelyn and the Polka King by John Olive
- Hyaena by Ross MacLean
- Lynette at 3 A.M. by Jane Anderson
- Marisol by José Rivera
- Old Lady's Guide to Survival by Mayo Simon
- Procedure by Joyce Carol Oates

1991

- Cementville by Jane Martin
- The Death of Zukasky by Richard Strand
- Down the Road by Lee Blessing
- In the Eye of the Hurricane by Eduardo Machado
- Night-Side by Shem Bitterman
- Out the Window by Neal Bell
- A Passenger Train of Sixty-One Coaches by Paul Walker
- A Piece of My Heart by Shirley Lauro
- What She Found There by John Glore

1990

- 2 by Romulus Linney
- Infinity's House by Ellen McLaughlin
- The Pink Studio by Jane Anderson
- The Swan by Elizabeth Egloff
- Vital Signs by Jane Martin
- Zara Spook and Other Lures by Joan Ackermann
- In Darkest America by Joyce Carol Oates

1989

- Autumn Elegy by Charlene Redick
- Blood Issue by Harry Crews
- Bone-the-Fish by Arthur Kopit
- The Bug by Richard Strand
- God's Country by Steven Dietz
- Incident at San Bajo by Brad Korbesmeyer
- Stained Glass by William F. Buckley, Jr.
- Tales of the Lost Formicans by Constance Congdon

1988

- Alone at the Beach by Richard Dresser
- Channels by Judith Fein
- Lloyd's Prayer by Kevin Kling
- The Metaphor by Murphy Guyer
- The Queen of the Leaky Roof Circuit by Jimmy Breslin
- Sarah and Abraham by Marsha Norman
- Whereabouts Unknown by Barbara Damashek

1987

- Deadfall by Grace McKeaney
- Digging Inby Julie Crutcher and Vaughn McBride
- Elaine's Daughter by Mayo Simon
- Glimmerglass by Jonathan Bolt
- Gringo Planet by Frederick Bailey
- T Bone N Weasel by Jon Klein
- Water Hole by Kendrew Lascelles

Shorts

- Chemical Reactions by Andy Foster
- Fun by Howard Korder
- The Love Talker by Deborah Pryor

1986

- Astronauts by Claudia Reilly
- How to Say Goodbye by Mary Gallagher
- No Mercy by Constance Congdon
- The Shaper by John Steppling
- Smitty's News by Conrad Bishop and Elizabeth Fuller
- Some Things You Need to Know Before the World Ends: A Final Evening with the Illuminati by Larry Larson and Levi Lee
- To Culebra by Jonathan Bolt
- Transports: two one-act plays:
  - 21A by Kevin Kling
  - How Gertrude Stormed the Philosopher's Club by Martin Epstein

1985

- Available Light by Heather McDonald
- Days and Nights Within by Ellen McLaughlin
- Ride the Dark Horse by J.F. O'Keefe
- Tent Meeting by Larry Larson, Levi Lee & Rebecca Wackler
- Two Masters by Frank Manley
- The Very Last Lover of the River Cane by James McLure
- War of the Roses (now titled Riches) by Lee Blessing

Shorts

- Advice to the Players by Bruce Bonafede
- The American Century by Murphy Guyer
- The Black Branch by Gary Leon Hill with Jo Hill
- The Root of Chaos by Douglas Soderberg

1984

- 007 Crossfire by Ken Jenkins
- Courtship by Horton Foote
- Danny and the Deep Blue Sea by John Patrick Shanley
- Execution of Justice by Emily Mann
- Husbandry by Patrick Tovatt
- Independence by Lee Blessing
- Lemons by Kent Broadhurst
- The Octette Bridge Club by P.J. Barry
- The Undoing by William Mastrosimone

1983

- Courage by John Pielmeier
- Eden Court by Murphy Guyer
- Food From Trash by Gary Leon Hill
- In a Northern Landscape by Timothy Mason
- Neutral Countries by Barbara Field
- Sandcastles by Adele Edling Shank
- Thanksgiving by James McLure
- A Weekend Near Madison by Kathleen Tolan
- Fathers and Daughters: two one-act plays:
  - A Tantalizing by William Mastrosimone
  - The Value of Names by Jeffrey Sweet

Shorts

- Bartok as Dog by Patrick Tovatt
- The Habitual Acceptance of the Near Enough by Kent Broadhurst
- Partners by Dave Higgins

1982

- Clara's Play by John Olive
- A Different Moon by Ara Watson
- Full Hookup by Conrad Bishop and Elizabeth Fuller
- The Grapes of Wrath by Terrence Shank
- The Informer by Thomas Murphy
- Oldtimers Game by Lee Blessing
- Talking With... by Jane Martin

Shorts

- The Eye of the Beholder by Kent Broadhurst
- The New Girl by Vaughn McBride
- The Groves of Academe by Mark Stein

Solo: a compendium of one-person plays:

- Sidekick by Jim Beaver
- The Survivalist by Robert Schenkkan
- The Subject Animal by Larry Atlas
- Rupert's Birthday by Ken Jenkins
- Slow Drag Mama by Isabel Monk and Dare Clubb
- Butterfly, Marguerite, Norma ... and Irma Jean by Trish Johnson

1981

- The Autobiography of a Pearl Diver by Martin Epstein
- Extremities by William Mastrosimone
- A Full Length Portrait of America by Paul D'Andrea
- My Sister in this House by Wendy Kesselman
- Future Tense by David Kranes
- Swop by Ken Jenkins
- Early Times: a compendium of short plays:
  - The Asshole Murder Case by Stuart Hample
  - Chapter Twelve — The Frog by John Pielmeier
  - Propinquity by Claudia Johnson
  - Quadrangle by Jon Jory
  - Spades by Jim Beaver
  - Twirler by Jane Martin

Shorts

- Chocolate Cake by Mary Gallagher
- Chug by Ken Jenkins
- Final Placement by Ara Watson

1980

- Agnes of God by John Pielmeier
- Doctors and Diseases by Peter Ekstrom
- The Coal Diamond by Shirley Lauro
- Nothing Immediate by Shirley Lauro
- Remington by Ray Aranha
- Sunset/Sunrise by Adele Edling Shank
- They're Coming to Make it Brighter by Kent Broadhurst
- Today a Little Extra by Michael Kassin
- Watermelon Boats by Wendy MacLaughlin
- Weekends Like Other People by David Blomquist
- The American Project: a compendium of short plays:
  - American Welcome by Brian Friel
  - The Drummer by Athol Fugard
  - The Golden Accord by Wole Soyinka
  - Hooray for Hollywood by John Byrne
  - San Salvador by Keith Dewhurst:
  - The Side of the Road by Gordon Dryland
  - Star Quality by Carol Bolt
  - Switching by Brian Clark
  - Tall Girls Have Everything by Stewart Parker
  - Vicki Madison Clocks Out by Alexander Buzo

1979

- Crimes of the Heart by Beth Henley
- Circus Valentine by Marsha Norman
- Find Me by Olwen Wymark
- Holidays: a compendium of short plays:
  - Bar Play by Lanford Wilson
  - Fireworks by Megan Terry
  - The Great Labor Day Classic by Israel Horovitz
  - I Can't Find it Anywhere by Oliver Hailey
  - Independence Day by Tom Eyen
  - In Fireworks Lie Secret Codes by John Guare
  - Juneteenth by Preston Jones
  - Merry Christmas by Marsha Norman
  - New Year's by Ray Aranha
  - Redeemer by Douglas Turner Ward
  - Lone Star by James McLure
  - Matrimonium by Peter Ekstrom

1978

- The Louisville Zoo by Anonymous Authors
- An Independent Woman by Daniel Stein
- Getting Out by Marsha Norman
- Does Anybody Here Do the Peabody? by Enid Rudd
- The Bridgehead by Frederick Bailey

1977

- The Gin Game by Donald L. Coburn
- Indulgences in the Louisville Harem by John Orlock

2009

- Ameriville by UNIVERSES (Steven Sapp; Mildred Ruiz-Sapp; Gamal Abdel Chasten; William Ruiz a.k.a.- NINJA)
- Slasher by Allison Moore
- Absalom by Zoe Kazan
- The Hard Weather Boating Party by Naomi Wallace
- Under Construction by Charles L. Mee, produced in association with the SITI Company
- Wild Blessings: A Celebration of Wendell Berry adapted for the stage by Marc Masterson and Adrien-Alice Hansel, original music by Malcolm Dalglish
- Brink! by Lydia R. Diamond, Kristoffer Diaz, Greg Kotis, Deborah Zoe Laufer, Peter Sinn Nachtrieb and Deborah Stein
- On the Porch One Crisp Spring Morning by Alex Dremann
- 3:59am: a drag race for two actors by Marco Ramirez
- Roanoke by Michael Lew, music and lyrics by Matt Schatz

2010

- Let Bygones Be by Gamal Abdel Chasten
- HEIST! conceived and created by Sean Daniels and Deborah Stein, written by Deborah Stein
- Lobster Boy by Dan Dietz
- Ground by Lisa Dillman
- Fissures (lost and found) by Steve Epp, Cory Hinkle, Dominic Orlando, Dominique Serrand, Deborah Stein and Victoria Stewart
- Post Wave Spectacular by Diana Grisanti
- An Examination of the Whole Playwright/Actor Relationship Presented As Some Kind of Cop Show Parody by Greg Kotis
- Sirens by Deborah Zoe Laufer
- The Method Gun created by Rude Mechs, written by Kirk Lynn
- The Cherry Sisters Revisited by Dan O'Brien with original music by Michael Friedman
- Phoenix by Scott Organ.

2011

- Mr. Smitten by Laura Eason
- Maple and Vine by Jordan Harrison
- Hygiene by Gregory Hischak
- Chicago, Sudan by Marc Bamuthi Joseph
- Elemeno Pea by Molly Smith Metzler
- BOB by Peter Sinn Nachtrieb
- Edith Can Shoot Things and Hit Them by A. Rey Pamatmat
- The Edge of Our Bodies by Adam Rapp
- A Devil at Noon by Anne Washburn
- The End by Dan Dietz, Jennifer Haley, Allison Moore, A. Rey Pamatmat, and Marco Ramirez.

2012

- Eat Your Heart Out by Courtney Baron
- How We Got On by Idris Goodwin
- Death Tax by Lucas Hnath
- Michael von Siebenburg Melts Through the Floorboards by Greg Kotis
- The Veri**on Play by Lisa Kron
- The Hour of Feeling by Mona Mansour
- Oh, Gastronomy! by Michael Golamco, Carson Kreitzer, Steve Moulds, Tanya Saracho, and Matt Schatz

The Ten-Minute Plays:

- The Dungeons and the Dragons by Kyle John Schmidt
- Hero Dad by Laura Jacqmin
- The Ballad of 423 and 424 by Nicholas C. Pappas

2013

- The Delling Shore by Sam Marks
- Appropriate by Branden Jacobs-Jenkins
- Cry Old Kingdom by Jeff Augustin
- Gnit by Will Eno
- O Guru Guru Guru, or why I don't want to go to yoga class with you by Mallery Avidon
- Sleep Rock Thy Brain by Rinne Groff, Lucas Hnath, and Anne Washburn

The Ten-Minute Plays:

- Halfway by Emily Schwend
- 27 Ways I Didn't Say "Hi" to Laurence Fishburne by Jonathan Josephson
- Two Conversations Overheard on Airplanes by Sarah Ruhl

2014

- Partners by Dorothy Fortenberry
- The Christians by Lucas Hnath
- The Grown-Up by Jordan Harrison
- brownsville song (b-side for tray) by Kimber Lee
- Steel Hammer created by SITI Company, music and lyrics by Julia Wolfe, original text by Kia Corthron, Will Power, Carl Hancock Rux and Regina Taylor
- Remix 38 by Jackie Sibblies Drury, Idris Goodwin, Basil Kreimendahl, Justin Kuritzkes and Amelia Roper

The Ten-Minute Plays:

- Winter Games by Rachel Bonds
- Some Prepared Remarks (A History in Speech) by Jason Gray Platt
- Poor Shem by Gregory Hischak

2015

- The Roommate by Jen Silverman
- Dot by Colman Domingo
- I Will Be Gone by Erin Courtney
- The Glory of the World by Charles L. Mee
- I Promised Myself to Live Faster, conceived and created by Pig Iron Theatre Company, text by Gregory S. Moss and Pig Iron Theatre Company
- That High Lonesome Sound, by Jeff Augustin, Diana Grisanti, Cory Hinkle, and Charise Castro

The Ten-Minute Plays:

- Rules of Comedy by Patricia Cotter
- So Unnatural a Level by Gary Winter
- Joshua Consumed an Unfortunate Pear by Steve Yockey

2016

- Residence by Laura Jacqmin
- For Peter Pan on Her 70th Birthday by Sarah Ruhl
- This Random World by Steven Dietz
- Wellesley Girl by Brendan Pelsue
- Cardboard Piano by Hansol Jung
- Wondrous Strange by Martyna Majok, Meg Miroshnik, Jiehae Park, and Jen Silverman

The Ten-Minute Plays:

- Coffee Break by Tasha Gordon-Solmon
- This Quintessence of Dust by Cory Hinkle
- Trudy, Carolyn, Martha, and Regina Travel to Outer Space and Have a Pretty Terrible Time There by James Kennedy

== See also ==
- List of attractions and events in the Louisville metropolitan area
- Performing arts in Louisville, Kentucky
