= Mildred Ruiz-Sapp =

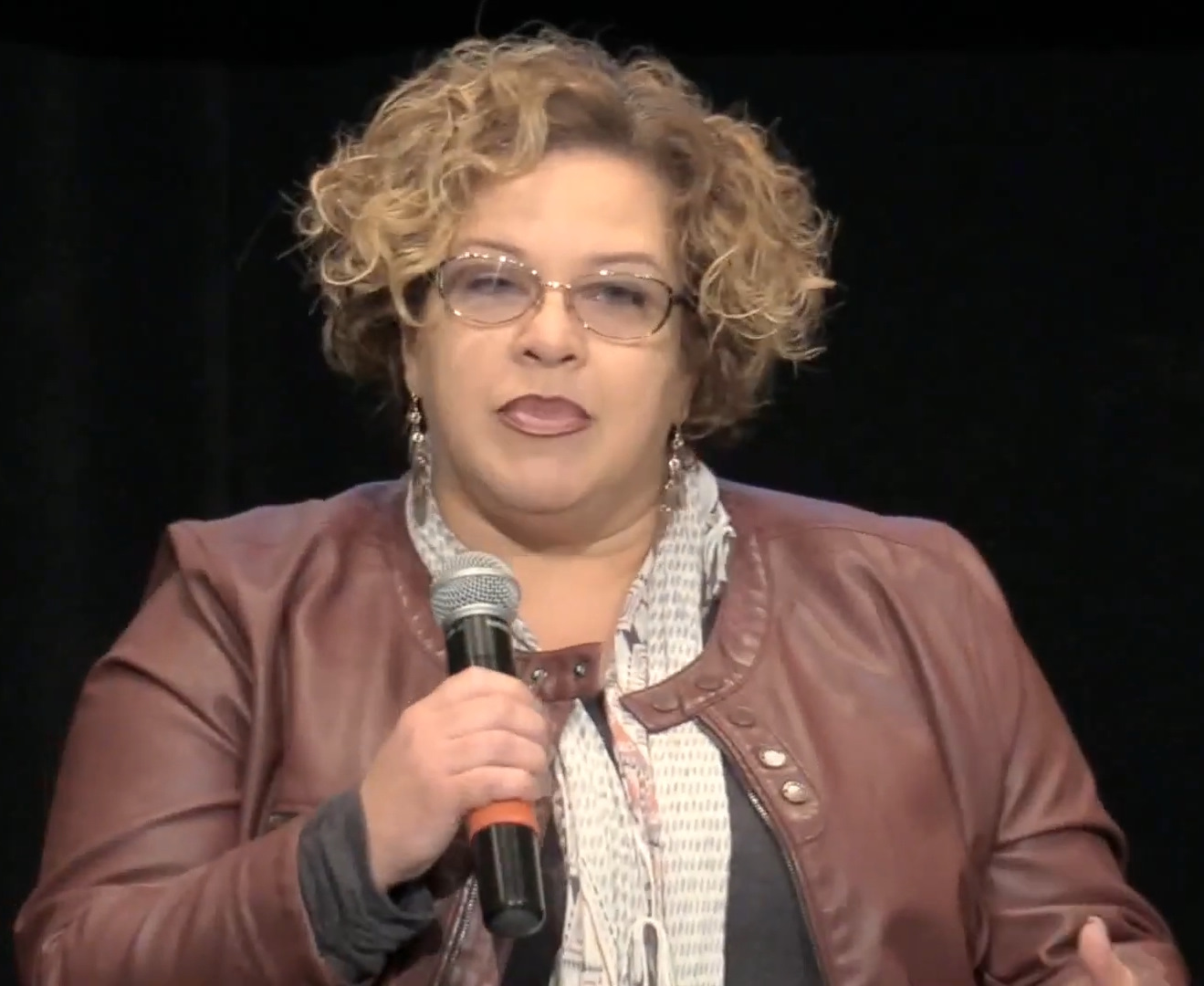
- Mildred Ruiz-Sapp at the Oregon Shakespeare Festival, September 2019
- Born: New York City, New York, U.S.
- Occupations: Poet, playwright and actor

Mildred Ruiz-Sapp is an American poet, playwright, actor, singer, songwriter, and filmmaker. Born and raised on New York's Lower East Side (Alphabet City), she co-founded THE POINT Community Development Corporation (Hunts Point) in 1993 and Universes (poetic theatre ensemble) in collaboration with Steven Sapp in 1996.

== Education and Career ==
Ruiz-Sapp earned her BA in Literature from Bard College in 1989 and is the co-founder and core member of Universes, a national ensemble theater company. Founded in The Bronx, New York, in 1995, Universes brings together a diverse group of multi-disciplined writers and performers of color who fuse theater, poetry, dance, jazz, hip hop, politics, blues, and Spanish boleros to create stage works. The group, originally formed as a poetry collective performing slam poetry at clubs and cafés in Manhattan's Lower East Side, began with members Ruiz-Sapp, her brother, William Ruiz, Gamal Chasten, and Steven Sapp.

The group created the production titled Ameriville, a response to how America responded in the aftermath of Hurricane Katrina. It premiered at the Actors Theater at Louisville’s Humana Festival in 2009. Universes aimed to present the United States as a united community, rather than a fractured society divided by divergent customs and beliefs. Ameriville was one of the few opportunities granted to Latina playwrights at the time, with Ruiz-Sapp playing a pivotal role in representing women playwrights of color.

In 2025, Ruiz-Sapp co-directed Tipi Tales from The Stoop, a project that explores family history and generational trauma. In collaboration with Murielle Borst-Tarrant, the production tells the story of a young girl growing up in the only Native family in a Mafia-run Brooklyn neighborhood, embarking on a quest to preserve cultural traditions.

== Theater Credits Include ==
- Purgatory
- Another I Dies Slowly
- Live From the Edge
- Slanguage
- Blue Suite
- Ameriville
- Rhythmicity: Flipping The Script
- One Shot In Lotus Position
- The Ride
- The Denver Project
- UniSon

== Television Credits Include ==
Film: Stay until Tomorrow by Laura Collela
Television: HBO's Def Poetry Jam (Season 4- Episode 9 (with UNIVERSES))

== Awards/Affiliations ==
2008 Jazz at Lincoln Center Rhythm Road Tour
2008 Theatre Communications Group (TCG) – Peter Zeisler Award
2002–2004 and 1999–2001 Theatre Communications Group (TCG) National Theater Artist Residency Program Award
2002 BRIO Awards (Bronx Recognizes Its Own-Singing) from The Bronx Council on the Arts;
1999 OBIE Award Grant (The Point CDC & Live From Theater Theater)
1999 Bessie Awards (The Point CDC)
1998 Union Square Award recipient
Co-Founder of The Point CDC
New York Theatre Workshop Usual Suspect
Board Member: National Performance Network
Former Board member: Network of Ensemble Theaters

== Additional Reading ==
- Universes: The Big Bang - Plays, Poetry and Process. United States: Theatre Communications Group, Incorporated, 2008.
- “Slanguage.” The Fire this Time: African-American Plays for the 21st Century. United Kingdom: Theatre Communications Group, 2004.
