= Snapshot (play) =

2002 stage play

- First edition cover
- Original language: English
- Written by: Tanya Barfield; Lee Blessing; Michael Bigelow Dixon; Julie Jensen; Sunil Kuruvilla; David Lindsay-Abaire; Victor Lodato; Quincy Long; Deb Margolin; Honor Molloy; Allison Moore; Lynn Nottage; Dan O'Brien; Val Smith; Annie Weisman; Craig Wright; Chay Yew
- Series: Humana Festival of New American Plays
- Subject: Monuments, patriotism, democracy
- Genre: Drama, comedy

Premiere
- Date: 3 March 2002
- Place: Actors Theatre of Louisville; Louisville, Kentucky

Snapshot is a dramatic anthology of sixteen individual short plays and monologues that collectively comprise a full-length stage play.

Snapshot includes A Quick Tour of the Monument by Craig Wright; Monument by Honor Molloy; Scene at Mount Rushmore by Quincy Long; Tyler Poked Taylor by Lee Blessing; Rock Scissors Paper by Deb Margolin; Little Pezidents by Michael Bigelow Dixon and Val Smith; Defacing Patriotic Property by Tanya Barfield; Her First Screen Test by Dan O'Brien; Thrift of the Magi by Annie Weisman; Night Out by Sunil Kuruvilla; Here and Now by Chay Yew; The Great Father by Victor Lodato; American Klepto by Allison Moore; Becoming American by Lynn Nottage; History Lesson by David Lindsay-Abaire; Bomb Squad by Craig Wright; and On Lincoln's Head by Julie Jensen.

Originally commissioned by the Actors Theatre of Louisville, the play premiered as part of the 26th annual Humana Festival of New American Plays, which ran from March 3 – April 13, 2002. Snapshot was subsequently published by Playscripts Inc., an has been licensed for production over 100 times at theatres and universities across the United States, Canada, and India.

== Plot ==
According to Snapshot's editor, Tanya Palmer:

"A photograph captures and documents a single moment in time and space -- a snapshot of history, of a reality bounded by the photo's frame. But what lies outside, beyond, behind the photograph? And what stories, memories, or associations does an image of place inspire? In this multi-writer project from Actors Theatre of Louisville, a diverse assortment of talented playwrights encounter and transform Mount Rushmore, South Dakota, 1969, a compelling image of the monument by renowned photographer Lee Friedlander. Their thought-provoking scenes and monologues range from delightful comedy to utterly serious tragedy, each approaching the photo's themes through a new lens."

A Quick Tour of the Monument by Craig Wright

An introduction to Mt. Rushmore from a slightly perplexed tour guide.

Monument by Honor Molloy

Two emergency telephone operators handle a terrifying series of calls on Tuesday morning, September 11, 2001.

Scene at Mount Rushmore by Quincy Long

In this beautiful, humorous family drama, brothers Bobby and Did contemplate stone-faced presidents and their momma's memory.

Tyler Poked Taylor by Lee Blessing

In his annual ritual at the foot of Mt. Rushmore, an 18-year-old reveals his erotic presidential fantasies.

Rock Scissors Paper by Deb Margolin

An teenager tells the tale of her drug-dealing brother, her ill-fated family vacation, and her mother's inability to turn around and face facts.

Little Pezidents by Michael Bigelow Dixon and Val Smith

Dave and Karen are stranded in the middle of nowhere, with nothing but some Pez dispensers to take their minds off their totaled car and relationship.

Defacing Patriotic Property by Tanya Barfield

A man approaches a plastic surgeon with an unusual request.

Her First Screen Test by Dan O'Brien

A young vaudeville actress prepares for her first photo shoot.

Thrift of the Magi by Annie Weisman

Trey and Tina search for the perfect ironic-retro-tourist-vintage-party clothes, only to discover each other's secret sacrifices.

Night Out by Sunil Kuruvilla

The morning after an extramarital liaison, two lovers scramble desperately to find the man's keys and hide the evidence from the woman's husband.

Here and Now by Chay Yew

A couple in their twilight years relives an entire relationship, full of youth, possibility, secrets, disappointments, and enduring connection.

The Great Father by Victor Lodato

A young man and woman in a psychiatric ward confront the violence lurking in history and in their own pasts.

American Klepto by Allison Moore

A woman goes to great lengths to defend her theft of a federally-protected piece of petrified wood.

Becoming American by Lynn Nottage

A phone-support instructor teaches his Ghanaian recruits how become American for the two or three minutes that it takes to solve the problems of a U.S. caller.

History Lesson by David Lindsay-Abaire

It is Maggie's last day as a park ranger, and she has an arsenal of made-up historical facts to unload on her helpless listeners.

Bomb Squad by Craig Wright

A ranger is powerless to stop a man determined to defuse the "conceptual land mine" that is Mt. Rushmore, all in song...

On Lincoln's Head by Julie Jensen

Aggrieved over her lost father, Babe is throwing firecrackers off the top of Lincoln's head. Annette, a ranger, is the only one crazy enough to stop her.

== Production history ==
=== World premiere ===
Snapshot had its world premiere at the Actors Theatre of Louisville in Louisville, Kentucky as part of the 26th annual Humana Festival of New American Plays, which ran from March 3 – April 13, 2002. The production was directed by Russell Vandenbroucke, and featured a 22-person ensemble of Colette Beauvais, Joey Belmaggio, Matt Bridges, Camilla Busnovetsky, Ellie Clark, Ryan Clardy, Kristi Funk, Amy Gillroy, Jake Goodman, Christopher Illing, Barbara Lanciers, Anthony Luciano, Alan Malone, Stacy Mayer, Elisa Morrison, Melanie Rademaker, Dave Secor, Donovan Sherman, Collin Sullivan, Kate Umstatter, Lindsey White, and Tom Wooldridge. The creative team included Paul Owen (scenic design), John White (costume design), Tony Penna (lighting design), Colbert Davis (sound design), Doc Manning (props), Sarah Hodges (stage manager), Amy Wegener (dramaturg), and Tanya Palmer (dramaturg).

=== Canadian premiere ===
Snapshot had its Canadian premiere at the William Davis Centre in Vancouver, British Columbia on May 20, 2004.

=== Indian premiere ===
Snapshot had its Indian premiere at Dramatist Anonymous in Ghaziabad, India on March 1, 2010.

== Critical reception ==
Snapshot received considerable critical praise upon its release. In a review for Booklist, Jack Helbig noted,

"Louisville's annual Humana Festival is famous as a showcase for new plays and playwrights. The 2002 festival included new works by such big guns as Anne Bogart, Tina Howe, Julia Jordan, Charles L. Mee, and Adam Rapp, while emerging playwrights were relegated to Humana's National Ten-Minute Play Contest. This collection manifests positive and negative sides of Humana's success. The best plays here--Howe's witty, polished fantasy, Rembrandt's Gift, and Charles L. Mee's literate comedy about a young woman entangled with an older man, Limonade Tous Les Jours--may be the best new full-length plays produced in America last year. But the results of the National Ten-Minute Play Contest are not included, which means the only truly new voices and risky writing appears in the interesting but gimmicky Snapshot. Like The Phone Plays of previous years, Snapshot consists of the contributions of playwrights well-known and not, this time in response to a Lee Friedlander photograph of tourists looking at Mount Rushmore. Of these, Honor Molloy's moving meditation on 9/11 is most haunting."

In a review for Duluth News Tribune, V. Paul Virtucio noted "Disturbingly funny and thought-provoking ... This is a play that encourages questioning conventional wisdom. You cannot show up expecting to be entertained without doing a little bit of brain work. And how better to start that off than to challenge the ideals encased in stone and superficially embraced by the millions of visitors to Mount Rushmore."

In a review for American Theatre, Andy Propst offered similar praise, writing ""In many ways, the photograph, as central to each play, helped to produce an intriguing fractal view of the country."

Backstage praised Snapshot as "A terrific collection of perspectives -- both directly and indirectly inspired by the photo, ranging from serious to sassy..."

== Publication ==
Snapshot was first published by Smith & Kraus in the anthology Humana Festival 2002: The Complete Plays on January 1, 2003.

The play was subsequently published and licensed internationally by Playscripts Inc. on August 13, 2003.
