= What Happens Later =

2023 film directed by Meg Ryan

- Theatrical release poster
- Directed by: Meg Ryan
- Screenplay by: Steven Dietz; Kirk Lynn; Meg Ryan
- Based on: Shooting Star by Steven Dietz
- Produced by: Jonathan Duffy; Kelly Williams; Laura D. Smith Ireland; Kristin Mann
- Starring: Meg Ryan; David Duchovny; Hal Liggett
- Cinematography: Bartosz Nalazek
- Edited by: Jason Gourson
- Music by: David Boman
- Production companies: Prowess Pictures; Ten Acre Films
- Distributed by: Bleecker Street
- Release date: November 3, 2023
- Running time: 104 minutes
- Country: United States
- Language: English
- Budget: $3 million
- Box office: $3.5 million

What Happens Later is a 2023 American romantic comedy film directed by Meg Ryan, written by Ryan, Steven Dietz and Kirk Lynn, and starring Ryan and David Duchovny.

Exes Willa and Bill bump into each other at a small airport, when their flights get delayed due to a snowstorm, then spend the night at the airport reliving their past.

The film was released by Bleecker Street on November 3, 2023. It received mixed reviews from critics and grossed $3 million.

== Plot ==
At a regional airport on Leap Day, ex-lovers Wilhelmina "Willa" Davis and William "Bill" Davis run into each other and make small talk during their layovers.

Willa and Bill are about to get on their respective connecting flights; Willa is on her way to Boston, and Bill is on his way to Austin. However, a storm, later identified as a bomb cyclone, causes flights at the airport to be delayed, leaving Willa and Bill to reconnect. Bill is married to Beth-Anne, with whom he has their 15-year-old daughter Rose, but Bill says he and his wife are “going through a thing.” Rose also wishes to be a dancer, which worries Bill. Meanwhile, Willa plans to visit her friend Ginny, who is splitting up with her husband.

While Willa and Bill reminisce about their past relationship, it is revealed that she suffered a miscarriage while they were together. After he left, she had a little girl with a man who disappeared as soon as he found out she was pregnant. Willa later gave her daughter up for adoption; she was able to find the perfect parents, but does not know where her daughter is now.

Bill mentions that he saw Willa a year prior while she was changing planes in Dallas. He did not say anything to her, as she looked lost. Bill obtains a hotel voucher but is unable to reserve a room as there are no vacancies.

It is announced that Willa's flight to Boston is now boarding, but she ends up giving up her seat for a family. Willa tries to give Bill her ticket after upgrading to first class so he will not miss Rose's recital, as both of them are “W. Davis”, but he refuses. Willa mentions that Beth-Anne called earlier, while he was grabbing coffee, to say that Rose prefers to stay with her instead for a few weeks. Bill then takes the ticket, only for all flights to be suspended suddenly.

Rose calls Bill, who encourages her to try her best at dancing, as earlier he had told her she would not make it as a professional dancer, saddening her. Willa tells Bill that she is actually going to Boston to meet her daughter Maggie, who had just turned 20 so had called her as she would like to meet. Earlier, Willa, using Bill's phone, texted Maggie, saying that she was not going to come. Maggie then replied, telling Willa to just try. Initially, this was seen as Willa texting Ginny.

The next day, all outbound flights are then announced to be departing shortly. Willa gifts Bill her rainstick, and Bill gives Willa an old card, saying that he has written his number on the back. They then kiss before leaving to board their respective flights.

Willa turns Bill's card over to discover that he only wrote "just try." She and Bill exchange final gestures through the windows of their planes, which are side by side on the tarmac. He tries to sign his phone number to Willa, only for their flights to depart as the contrails from the planes form a heart.

== Cast ==
- Meg Ryan as Willa
- David Duchovny as Bill
- Hal Liggett as airport voice

== Production ==
Meg Ryan first announced the film was in development in a May 2022 Instagram post. It is Ryan's second feature film as director, after 2015's Ithaca, and also her first film as an actor since Ithaca.

The film is based on Steven Dietz's 2008 play Shooting Star. It is produced by Jonathan Duffy, Kelly Williams, Laura D. Smith, and Kristin Mann.

Principal photography began on October 26, 2022, in Bentonville, Arkansas and at Northwest Arkansas National Airport.

== Release ==
What Happens Later was originally scheduled to be released in theaters on October 13, 2023, but was moved to November 3 to avoid competition with the Taylor Swift concert film Taylor Swift: The Eras Tour.

== Reception ==
=== Box office ===
In North America, the film made $601,372 from 1,492 theaters in its first day, and went on to make $1.5 million from its opening weekend, finishing in ninth.

=== Critical response ===
On the review aggregator website Rotten Tomatoes, 51% of 73 critics' reviews are positive, with an average rating of 5.2/10. The website's consensus reads: "A pair of beloved stars and a refreshingly mature take on rom-com tropes are almost enough to overcome What Happens Later's increasingly cloying execution." Metacritic, which uses a weighted average, assigned the film a score of 59 out of 100, based on 21 critics, indicating "mixed or average" reviews. Audiences polled by PostTrak gave it a 43% overall positive score, with 25% saying they would definitely recommend the film.
