= UniSon =

Musical by UNIVERSES Theater

UNISON is a musical by UNIVERSES Theater (Mildred Ruiz-Sapp, Steven Sapp, William Ruiz), originally inspired by the poetry of August Wilson among others; commissioned and premiering at the Oregon Shakespeare Festival a.k.a. OSF (2017).

UniSon was commissioned by the Oregon Shakespeare Festival (OSF) and premiered at OSF in April 2017. Robert O'Hara directed. His design team included Choreographer, Byron Easley; Scenic Designer, Christopher Acebo; Lighting Designer, Alex Jainchill; Video Designer, Kaitlyn Pietras; Composers, UNIVERSES with Broken Chord and Toshi Reagon. Dramaturgy by Joan Herrington.

== Production cast and design team ==
Oregon Shakespeare Festival

- Original Cast: Steven Sapp, Asia Mark, Christiana Clark, William Ruiz, Kevin Kenerly, Rodney Gardiner, Mildred Ruiz-Sapp, Yvette Clark, Johnathan Luke Stevens].
- Artistic Team: UNIVERSES - Steven Sapp, Mildred Ruiz-Sapp, William Ruiz (Playwrights); Robert O'Hara (director); Byron Easley (Choreographer); Universes with Broken Chord and Toshi Reagon (Composers); Christopher Acebo (Scenic Design); Alex Jainchill (Lighting Design); Kaitlyn Pietras (Video Designer); Dede M. Ayite (Costume Designer).
