= Julie Jensen =

Julie Jensen may refer to:

- Julie Jensen (handballer) (born 1996), Danish handball player
- Julie Brendengen Jensen (born 1990), Norwegian freestyle skier
- Julie Kepp Jensen (born 2000), Danish swimmer
- Julie Trustrup Jensen (born 1994), Danish footballer
- Julie Jensen McDonald (1929–2013), American author
- Murder of Julie Jensen, in 1996
