= Lonely Planet (disambiguation) =

Lonely Planet is a travel guide book publisher.

Lonely Planet may also refer to:

- Lonely Planet (film), 2024 American romantic drama film
- Lonely Planet (play), two character play
- "Lonely Planet" (song), performed by Dorians representing Armenia in the Eurovision Song Contest 2013
- "Lonely Planet", Rachel Platten song on her 2016 album Wildfire
- "Lonely Planet", The The song on the 1993 album Dusk.
- Lonely Planet or Globe Trekker, travel television series
