= Party People =

Party People may refer to:

- People who love to party
- Party People (album), a 2005 album by Maki Nomiya
- "Party People" (Parliament song), a 1979 song by Parliament
- "Party People" (Nelly song), a 2008 song by Nelly featuring Fergie
- "Party People (Ignite the World)", a 2011 song by Erika Jayne
- "Party People", a 2010 song by N.E.R.D from the album Nothing
- "Party People", a 2012 song by Florida Georgia Line from the album Here's to the Good Times
- "Party People", a 2012 remix of Edita Piekha's song "Nash Sosed" by DJs Gary Caos and Rico Bernasconi
- Party People (TV series), a South Korean television program
- Party People (play), a 2012 play by UNIVERSES Theater Ensemble
- The Party People, a retail party supply chain based in Australia
