= Trying to Find Chinatown =

Play written by David Henry Hwang

- Original language: English
- Written by: David Henry Hwang

Premiere
- Date: March 29, 1996
- Place: Actors Theatre of Louisville

Trying to Find Chinatown is a 1996 play by American playwright David Henry Hwang. It deals with issues of racial identity by pitting an Asian street musician against a Caucasian man who claims Asian American heritage.

The Caucasian man is on his way to the house his recently deceased father was born in, which he claims is Chinatown. The violinist is angered by the white man's insistence he's Asian, not knowing that the white man was adopted by Asian-American parents.

The play premiered as part of the Actors Theatre of Louisville's Humana Festival on March 29, 1996. It was directed by Paul McCrane.

It is published as the titular play in the collection Trying to Find Chinatown: The Selected Plays by Theatre Communications Group and as one title in a dual acting edition with Hwang's Bondage published by Dramatists Play Service.
