= Hazzard County =

Hazzard County may refer to:

- Hazzard County, Georgia, a fictional county in the TV series The Dukes of Hazzard
- Hazzard County (play), a 2005 comedy-drama
