= Universes (theatre ensemble) =

General Information
- Name: UNIVERSES
- Type: Poetic Musical Theater Ensemble
- Year Founded: 1995
- Members: Steven Sapp; Mildred Ruiz-Sapp; Gamal Abdel Chasten; William Ruiz (a.k.a. Ninja)
- Location: New York City, New York, United States (Bronx, NY & Lower East Side - L.E.S)
- Website: www.universesonstage.com/

Universes (stylized UNIVERSES) is a New York-based American ensemble company of multi-disciplined writers and performers who fuse poetry, theater, jazz, hip hop, politics, down home blues and Spanish boleros to create what has been described as moving, challenging and entertaining theatrical works. The group, with four core members, breaks traditional theatrical bounds to create its own brand of theater.

Founded in New York in 1995, the members of Universes came together in the urban poetry scene of the late 1990s. Through sessions at the New York Theatre Workshop they have developed from a revue format to mounting fully fledged theater pieces. They have performed at venues throughout the United States and toured extensively world-wide.

== History ==
In early 1995, while collaborating at The POINT CDC and frequenting the NuYorican Poets Cafe, a group of poets decided to perform together, something which had happened before on separate occasions but with different players. This night it would be Steven Sapp, Flaco Navaja, Caridad de la Luz and Hector Luis Rivera (Mildred was present but performed a song separately that night). In planning for this performance, the group decided that they should give themselves a name. They went through several ideas for several hours and at the end of the night gave up and decided to use the last name given by Hector Luis Rivera, "UNIVERSES from the BronxSide". The poets each read poems in tandem but managed to link them in subject matter. After that "one night only" performance, Hector continued his work with The Welfare Poets and the rest of the group, including Mildred, decided to evolve the company incorporating music and theater. Paul Jonathan Thompson (Trumpet) joined the company soon after as did Angel Rodriguez (Percussion). The company was featured at WORD LIFE (Irvin Plaza) on February 8, 1997. Introduced by Felipe Luciano (formerly of the Young Lords Party) the company opened the show.

After this, some of company members then traveled to Poland within a larger group of actors from THE POINT's Live from The Edge Theater under the leadership of Steven and Mildred to collaborate in a production of Alfred Jarry's UBU under the direction of Steven Sapp in collaboration with Teatre Ploski. Caridad de la Luz began to pursue her solo career soon thereafter. On March 22, 1997, Universes from the Bronxside was invited to perform at a fundraiser event at El Puente (Brooklyn, NY) called Lemon+Aid to help Lemon Andersen, who was then imprisoned, after his release. Steven, Mildred, Flaco & Caridad and Paul performed that night. Once Lemon was released and saw the fundraiser video tape, he visited UNIVERSES at The Point to meet them. Soon thereafter, Lemon joined the company and after seeing some of the theatrical performances Steven and Mildred had created at Bard College in 1989 (namely, "Purgatory") he was on board with the idea that the company should shift into a more theatrical ensemble.

Universes was creating 10–15 minute vignettes which incorporated Poetry, Music, Theater and movement. As the company grew in name recognition, Lemon, who was from brooklyn, asked if the company could drop "from the Bronxside", The company agreed, in an effort to be more inclusive and more "universal". After that, UNIVERSES invited Gamal Abdel Chasten to join the company. Gamal was also a poet in the NYC scene and complimented UNIVERSES storytelling and musical styles. Lois Griffith of The NuYorican Poets Cafe invited UNIVERSES for a dull evening of work. Before then, Universes would only perform 10–15 vignettes at venues. This would be the first of UNIVERSES' full-length works. It had no title, and included some of the companies already polished pieces and some new works. Universes then decided that they would work on their 1st play ... "The Ride".

Universes members all grew up in housing projects in New York City and starting performing poetry in the "thriving spoken-word scene" of the late 1990s, namely, The NuYorican Poets Cafe. Based out of The Bronx, NY, the company was born and raised of the artistic environment created by Steven Sapp and Mildred Ruiz, also co-founders of THE POINT Community Development Corporation (Hunts Point) in 1993. The company was founded by Steven Sapp and Mildred Ruiz-Sapp and currently consists of four core members: Steven Sapp, Mildred Ruiz-Sapp, Gamal Abdel Chasten and William Ruiz (a.k.a. Ninja).

The company's work transitioned from a revue format to fully fledged theatrical pieces under the direction of Jo Bonney at the New York Theatre Workshop, where they presented their first major show, Slanguage in 2001. Originally written and performed by UNIVERSES (Steven, Mildred, Gamal, Flaco Navaja and Lemon Andersen, Slanguage evolved from a work entitled U, first presented at Performance Space 122 in 1999, and then was developed via workshops and performances at the Mark Taper Forum, Los Angeles, and New World Theatre at the University of Massachusetts Amherst. This was followed by Rhythmicity: Flipping the Script, created in collaboration with UNIVERSES (Steven, Mildred, Gamal), Reg.e.gaines, Rha Goddess, Willie Perdomo and Regie Cabico, featured at the Actors Theater of Louisville’s Humana Festival of New American Plays in 2003; Steven Sapp and Mildred Ruiz-Sapp’s "Eyewitness Blues" directed by Talvin Wilks at New York Theatre Workshop (later redeveloped as "Blue Suite" under the direction of Chay Yew for Gala Hispanic Theater and The Goodman Theatre; and Gamal Chasten's The Last Word, premièred at Performance Space 122.

In 2008, Universes toured to Morocco, Tunisia, Turkey, Romania, the Netherlands and the United Kingdom as part of the United States Department of State's “Rhythm Road: American Music Abroad” program through Jazz at Lincoln Center, performing a variety of pieces including New Orleans, Mahalia, Freedom Suite, Don't Front and Junior Calling. UNIVERSES premièred Ameriville (Created by: Steven, Mildred, Gamal and Ninja (William Ruiz)), a work examining the United States through the aftermath of Hurricane Katrina at the Actors Theater of Louisville’s Humana Festival of New American Plays in 2009 and toured with it throughout America.

The Oregon Shakespeare Festival commissioned the company to produce new works for their "American Revolutions: U.S. History Cycle" project. Party People premiered at the festival in 2012. UniSon, inspired by and using excerpts of August Wilson's unpublished poetry, premiered in 2017.

In 2019 Universes' anthology, entitled The Big Bang: Plays, Poetry and Process will be published by Theatre Communications Group (TCG Books).

== Members ==
Mildred Ruiz-Sapp, married to fellow member Steven Sapp, is also elder sister to William "Ninja" Ruiz. The three, plus Gamal Abdel Chasten, make up the current core four of the group. However, as described by Ruiz-Sapp, the nature of UNIVERSES allows members to come and go as works with their schedules.

Past collaborating members of UNIVERSES include (in order of appearance): Flaco Navaja, Caridad de la Luz, Paul J. Thompson, Angel Rodriguez, Lemon Andersen, Carlos Pimentel, Antoine Drey, Maurice Turner.

== Reception ==
The group has been generally well received by critics in the United States and further afield, although with some reservations. The Boston Herald, said of Slanguage that it "crackles with passion and street-smart humor. It's a linguistic fireworks display, and it's difficult not to be swept along with its percussive momentum and dazzling wordplay." The New York Times said, "Here, out of the mouths and clapping hands and dancing feet of five multitalented performers known collectively as Universes, comes the poetry of the city, minted in the urban furnace where the flint of real life strikes the sparks of creation from concrete pavement and steel tracks."

The New Orleans Times-Picayune said of Ameriville, "In urban planning terms, "Ameriville" is a high-density block. Under the direction of Chay Yew, a torrent of characters, words, movement and song issued from William "Ninja" Ruiz, Gamal Chasten, Steven Sapp and Mildred "Mils" Ruiz-Sapp. Their execution dazzled on multiple levels for 90 nonstop minutes. But the emotional payout was inconsistent, especially after the setting shifted from New Orleans." The Denver Post suggested that most "effective are the scenes that are more personal than didactic, honest, first-person stories that address the underlying issues in a more tangential way: a man wonders who will carry on the traditions of the Carnival krewes, who will be the "Little Chiefs" if everyone goes away. A man in a barber shop reminisces about his mother's anger over a bad haircut. A Mardi Gras partyer sits on a curb trying to hold down the numerous hurricane cocktails he's consumed. It is these small, genuine moments from everyone's lives that paint the picture best."

== Works ==
- UniSon
- Party People
- Spring Training (Igor Stravinsky)
- Ameriville
- Blue Suite
- Rhythmicity: Flipping The Script
- The Denver Project
- The Last Word
- One Shot In Lotus Position
- Eyewitness Blues (Which later became BLUE SUITE)
- Slanguage
- Live From The Edge
- The Ride
