= Dracula (1996 play) =

Play by Steven Dietz

- Original language: English
- Written by: Steven Dietz
- Based on: Dracula by Bram Stoker
- Characters: Count Dracula; Jonathan Harker; Mina Harker; Abraham Van Helsing; Lucy Westenra; Dr. John Seward; Renfield; Brides of Dracula
- Genre: Horror
- Setting: England, Transylvania

Dracula is an adaptation, first published in 1996, by American playwright Steven Dietz of Bram Stoker's 1897 novel by the same name. Though it has never run on Broadway, the author lists it among his most financially successful works, and it is frequently performed near Halloween in regional and community theaters. Closely following the plot of the novel, the play chronicles Count Dracula's journey to England, his stalking of two young women, and his pursuit and eventual defeat by the heroines' suitors and their associates.

== History ==
=== Style and fidelity ===
While all of Stoker's major plot points are present in Dietz's adaptation, they are not presented in the same order. While the novel presents its various journal entries and letters in roughly chronological order, Jonathan Harker's initial trip to Transylvania and his stay in Dracula's castle are presented as flashbacks in the play.

Dietz' version is not campy, though the character Renfield is used to provide some comic relief. Dietz emulates Stoker's use of language, and incorporates fragments of Stoker's original dialog, both in and out of its original context.

The only major characters not appearing on-stage are two of Lucy Westenra's three suitors, Quincey Morris and Arthur Holmwood. Both are mentioned in dialog between Lucy and Mina, however, and the remaining suitor, Dr. John Seward, sometimes serves as a composite character of three.

=== Deviations from the novel ===
- Renfield serves as a narrator, delivering a prologue and epilogue.
- There are only two Brides (called "Vixens") scripted, though the number cast in individual productions varies.
- Dracula's voyage is described, rather than staged, in a conversation between Seward and Dracula, who is posing as Harker.

== Synopsis ==
=== Act 1 ===
The first section of the play follows Lucy Westenra's search for love while she listens to her best friend, Mina Murray, describe her passion for her fiancé, Jonathan Harker. Lucy eventually falls for a psychologist named Dr. John Seward. Seward has an obsession with two things: finding love and unlocking the mind of a madman. His focus during the attempts of the latter is on a man featuring symptoms of psychosis named Renfield. During Seward and Lucy's romantic choices and life pursuits, Mina corresponds with her own lover, who has gone on a business trip selling land to a Count Dracula in the Carpathian Mountains of Transylvania. They exchange letters for some time, until eventually Harker's letters quit coming.

Shortly after this, Mina notices that her friend, Lucy, begins sleepwalking and acting very ill. Knowing that he has medical training, Mina sends for Dr. Seward to come and diagnose Lucy's sickness. Seward is unable to see what might be ailing Lucy, but notices what appears to be a blood mark from a kiss on her neck. Disturbed, he sends for his old professor, Abraham Van Helsing, who teaches philosophy and researches unexplainable and supernatural illnesses. At first, Van Helsing is hesitant to come, but Seward reminds him that he once saved his life. Van Helsing arrives and recognizes the marks on Lucy's neck as Vampire bites, but keeps the information to himself, not thinking the group will believe in Vampires. Van Helsing gives Lucy a blood-transfusion in order to keep the Vampiric attributes within her from taking over.

While Lucy is recovering from serious diarrhea, Harker returns home, and is seemingly insane after an unknown experience in the Carpathian Mountains. Harker is held inside Seward's asylum until he can retain some of his sanity. Mina finds her fiancé's journal after he is taken away. She and Van Helsing read it together... it reveals Harker's experience with the Count Dracula, who has attempted to steal Harker's identity and is either headed to or already in London (where the group lives). Act I of the play ends with intersecting lines from present time and flashbacks to Transylvania between Van Helsing, Renfield, Mina, Harker, and Dracula - the last of whom declares the final line, "I am bound for England!", foreshadowing his menacing journey.

=== Act 2 ===
Seward returns to go visit Lucy, where she attempts to seduce him (allowing her Vampiric side to take over). He closes his eyes for a kiss, during which Lucy planned to drain him of blood, but Van Helsing enters the room, using a crucifix to "kill" her. In an attempt to explain why he had attacked Lucy, Van Helsing must expose his theory of Vampirism as a disease taking over Lucy's body. This disease would have had to have been spread to her by another Vampire, probably one with a permanent form of the affliction.

Harker, Seward, and Van Helsing go to Lucy's grave after hearing of the disappearance of several small boys. They find that Lucy's vampire side is still alive. After a struggle, the sun comes up, forcing Lucy into her coffin, where Van Helsing impales her with a stake and cuts off her head. When killing Lucy, a Bible carried by the men caught on fire, forming the word "Carfax" in reference to an abbey adjoining Seward's asylum. The men rush back to see if anyone had been allowed to enter the abbey and harm Mina. She appears safe, but Van Helsing recognizes changes in her personality, implying to him that she too has had contact with the Count Dracula of whom Harker had spoken of in his journal.

Van Helsing and Harker sweep the abbey, sanctifying the soil of every coffin they find with holy water. After returning to see Mina, she collapses on her bed, and Van Helsing begins a blood transfusion between her and Harker (to save her). During the transfusion, Seward is notified that Renfield has escaped. Van Helsing and Seward leave to go find the madman, and Harker stays with Mina to complete the blood transfusion. While Harker is still giving blood, Renfield enters the room, leading Dracula inside as well. The count kills Renfield (for he had served his purpose) and knocks Harker unconscious. Dracula then forces Mina to drink his blood, increasing her Vampiric attributes. Once again, though, Van Helsing arrives in time to save Dracula's victim. Using a crucifix, Van Helsing drives the count away.

The group in London decides to hypnotize Mina in order to allow her Vampiric side to give up Dracula's location. Van Helsing, Seward, Harker, and Mina then track Dracula back to his castle in Transylvania, to which he has fled. There, while the sun is up, the group tries to impale Dracula in his coffin, but are delayed by Dracula's Vixens and Mina (who has now allowed herself to be completely consumed by the Vampire within). The sun sets and Dracula rises to defeat his foes. He kisses Mina, but knowing that Dracula could not be in the presence of anything belonging to God, her human side keeps a piece of holy bread in her mouth... thus causing him to retreat to his coffin, where Van Helsing drives a stake into his heart. After Dracula's death, anyone once infected with his form of Vampirism no longer feels the effects of the disease.

Finally, the play ends with Van Helsing urging himself, the other characters, and the audience to remain vigilant and keep watch for evil in world around them... to know that it exists, and to be ready to defeat it.

Curtain call is made during a final monologue given by Renfield. End show.

=== Characterization and contrasts ===
As within Bram Stoker's novel, Steven Dietz' version of Dracula draws several interesting contrasts between the antagonist and the other characters of the plot (specifically Van Helsing). At the beginning of the play, Count Dracula is very old and has little control over his body or his life. He is isolated in the Carpathian Mountains with few resources left at his disposal to quench the thirst of his Vampiric disease.... and without fresh blood to restrengthen his faculties, he grows weaker and older every day. He is in a very monstrous sort of state. Whereas on the other hand, Professor Van Helsing seems to be very proper and in control of his life and his intellect. The professor appears to have aged very well and not show his advanced years in his physique. However, as the play progresses, the two seem to reverse positions. Van Helsing, in his obsession with hunting Dracula (for unknown, savage reasons), seems to lose his temper more easily, have less control over his attacks on the count, and lose the trust of those around him. It is implied that his age sets in more and he loses control of his mind and his life during his hunt for Dracula. Much in the opposite route, Dracula seems to take control of his life and assets (moving to London where he can drain people of blood). He also grows much younger as the play moves forward. Because of this, though Dracula dies in the second act of the play, his dark purpose "wins" in the end. Van Helsing and the others must forever be haunted by the knowledge that Vampires exist and must constantly be on guard against evil. Their lives are no longer their own because they must devote themselves to protecting people against dark forces. Dracula, though, regains control of his life and his youth... and in the end was released from the tragedy of his Vampiric illness (through his death), making his death of no punishment at all for the deeds he had done.

It is implied that those who have evil purposes will sometimes be the ones who suffer no consequences in real life, but those who do suffer in life may have better things to look forward to after death.

== Critical response ==
Critical reception of this version of Dracula has been mixed, with some praising Dietz's faithfulness to the source material (compared to the campy adaptations or those which have taken liberties with plot and characters). Others note that the rapid scene changes and jumbled sequence of events (Harker's initial trip to Transylvania is presented as a series of flashbacks throughout the play) are difficult to follow, and the florid language seems stilted.

A newly updated revision is to be produced as a world premiere at ACT Theatre in Seattle in October, 2019.
