= One Flea Spare =

- Written by: Naomi Wallace
- Original language: English
- Genre: Drama

Premiere
- Date premiered: 18 October 1995
- Place premiered: Bush Theatre, London

One Flea Spare, by Naomi Wallace, is a play set in plague-ravaged 17th Century London.

== Synopsis ==
A wealthy couple is preparing to flee their home when a mysterious sailor and a young girl appear sneaking into their boarded up house. Now, quarantined together for 28 days, the only thing these strangers fear more than the Plague is each other. Definitions of morality are up for grabs and survival takes many forms in this dark, fiercely intense & humorous play. The play deals with the clash of cultural, social, and sexual boundaries.

The play is published by Broadway Play Publishing Inc.

The title is derived from the poem The Flea by John Donne.

== Productions ==
London (1995)

One Flea Spare premièred in London at the Bush Theatre on 18 October 1995.

Louisville, Kentucky (1996)

It had its American premiere in Louisville, Kentucky, at the Humana Festival of New American Plays on 27 February 1996.

New York (1996)

The play opened in New York at The Public Theater on 9 March 1997 and won the OBIE Award for best play; it also won the 1996 Susan Smith Blackburn Prize, the 1996 Joseph Kesselring Prize and the 1996 Fellowship of Southern Writers Drama Award.

=== New York cast ===
- Dianne Wiest as Mrs. Darcy Snelgrave
- Mischa Barton as Morse
- Bill Camp as Bunce
- Jon De Vries as Mr. William Snelgrave
- Paul Kandel as Kabe

France

In 2009 One Flea Spare was incorporated into the permanent répertoire of the French National Theater, the Comédie-Française. Wallace is the only living American playwright to enter the répertoire. Only two American Playwrights have ever been added to La Comédie's repertoire in 300 years: the other being Tennessee Williams. The play was translated into French by Dominique Hollier.

The Czech Republic

In 2011 One Flea Spare was incorporated into the permanent répertoire of Komorní scéna Aréna in Ostrava. It was translated by Andrea Hoffmannová and directed by Peter Gábor. Cast: Jan Fišar (William Snelgrave), Alena Sasínová-Polarczyk (Darcy Snelgrave), Josef Kaluža (Bunce), Zuzana Truplová (Morse), Marek Cisovský (Kabe).

== Publication ==
One Flea Spare is published in an acting edition by Broadway Play Publishing Inc.
