= God's Country (play) =

1988 play by Steven Dietz

God's Country is a 1988 play written by American playwright Steven Dietz and first produced by ACT Theatre in Seattle. It covers the events around the 1984 murder of Alan Berg, a Jewish radio talk show host, by the white supremacist group The Order. The play had been produced over 200 times by 1998.

== Plot ==
The play uses nonlinear narrative strands following three people:

- Alan Berg, a Jewish talk show host who was murdered by members of The Order
- Robert Jay Mathews, the founder of The Order
- Denver Parmenter, a former member of The Order who became a prosecutor's witness in the federal trial against members of the Order

The frame of the play is a trial from real life of ten members of The Order on racketeering charges. Much of the dialogue of the play comes through documents like court transcripts and statements from Order members. A series of fictional vignettes rounds out the play.

== Production ==
God's Country, written by Steven Dietz, was first produced by ACT Theatre in Seattle. As of 1998, the play had been produced over 200 times.

== Reception ==
Many critics thought the play was important to understand supremacist extremism in the United States following events such as the 1995 Oklahoma City bombing. A review in The News & Observer in 2010 said that the production was a "chilling reminder of the results of unchecked hatred."

The play's reliance on primary sources and documents meant that the characters "speak mostly their own words," which some critics appreciated. However, some critics desired a deeper investigation into the motivations and beliefs of The Order. According to the Seattle Post-Intelligencer: "[…The play] retains an observer's distance that, at this remove, fails to satisfy. We know what they believe. How do they believe it? Dietz seems as lost as the rest of us." The Chicago Reader said "God’s Country never offers a convincing psychological portrait of the people it puts center stage."

The Los Angeles Times and The News & Observer wrote that the play tried to give too much information in facts and dates, confusing the audience. The play's format where scenes change quickly and actors change characters also added to confusion.

Many critics praised the interlude scenes, calling them powerful, eerie, and gripping.
