= Private Eyes (play) =

1996 play by Steven Dietz

Private Eyes is a 1996 drama by Steven Dietz about deception and broken trust, labeled by the author as a "comedy of suspicion", as the story is brought in multiple layers and the audience is repeatedly tricked to believe that the current situation is real. Some critics - though not Dietz himself - consider it an homage to Tom Stoppard's 1982 The Real Thing, a play which features some similar themes and techniques.

== Story ==
Husband and wife Matthew and Lisa are rehearsing a two- or perhaps three-person play. The British director Adrian uses his position of power to instantly seduce the "strikingly beautiful" Lisa and for a month or so Matthew desperately tries to deny their brazenly open affair or fantasizes about revenge. Then, Adrian's wife Cory tracks him down and Lisa turns out to be just another notch on his belt, after which all go their separate ways. In the brief final scene, Lisa approaches Matthew many years later, both declaring to have thought about only each other ever since.

This simple storyline is hidden in multiple, often conflicting layers, leaving the audience with doubts what part to believe (and some may even doubt the outline above). Like the beginning of Stoppard's play, the first scene is revealed to be the play the couple is rehearsing, with the additional twist that this play-in-a-play is about an audition and an affair between a director and an actress. The entire first half turns out to be a wistful version of how Matthew would have liked to expose the affair of his wife, as told to his therapist Frank (whose role can be played by a man or woman).

Frank sometimes speaks to the audience, coming to its rescue in especially confusing situations, and presenting him/herself as the only one it can really trust. However, perhaps he/she is not a real character but merely a metaphorical tool to reveal the internal struggles of both Matthew and Lisa (who also has taken Frank as her therapist), an idea enhanced by Frank's last narration that turns out to be an audition for Matthew.

In the second act, we get a retelling of the events (by Matthew to Frank) from the beginning of the affair. This still non-linear process deteriorates slowly into several nightmarish scenes with Lisa letting her husband leave the rehearsal room (so Adrian can make love to her) or Matthew getting scolded by his wife and Adrian after being forced to watch them in bed. Comedic relief is provided by the appearance of Cory, who initially introduces herself as a "private eye" for Adrian's suspecting wife. Her violent revenge may also just be a fantasy as we're told that the bullet she fired "only" grazed Adrian's heart and he took a flight back to England, presumably to continue his predatory ways.

Although each layer by itself is deceptively plausible, the play takes several turns that make events in previous layers and sometimes even the overall story impossible. Examples of the latter are Frank's final audition and Cory featuring in Matthew's first account to Frank as an unlikely accomplice in his fantasized revenge before he meets her in a higher layer of the story. Such "plot holes" could be considered nods to Stoppard's play and the theater of the absurd. Dietz's use of comedic moments throughout the play, like the characters' unnatural wittiness, absurd but cathartic turns of events, and unexpectedly banal plays on words like Frank and "private Dick" has been suggested to be "because only a comedy can make us realize the truths we are not fond of".

== Theme ==
Dietz described the origin of this play as "a scene in which two lovers fail to speak the truth. And, like a lie, the play grew. It began to go to greater and greater lengths to keep its own deceit afloat. It took my sense of structure for a ride and built a web of such complexity that clarity (a/k/a `truth') was rendered virtually impossible."

The theme of deception pervades the play at all levels. Besides the deception of the double adultery, each character takes several opportunities to deceive the other, be it in fantasy or for real. Matthew and Lisa also suffer from self-deception, as he refuses to believe the unpleasant turn of events, holding on to things, while everyone else is changing their lives, and she convinces herself that all this doesn't have to hurt Matthew. Dietz's breaking of several conventional rules of the theater of course repeatedly deceives the audience in believing each new version of reality. This, perhaps intentionally, can leave some members of the audience feel betrayed at the end, feeling used as a dupe for a magician's bag of tricks.

== Title ==
Dietz had started to write the play as early as 1990 with the title The Usual Suspects. This version had a stage reading by the Arizona Theatre Company in 1992. In 1995, Christopher McQuarrie wrote a hit movie with that title, and Dietz "begrudgingly" changed his title.

== Performances ==
"Private Eyes" was first performed in March 1996 by the Arizona Theatre Company. It gained wide recognition when it was presented as part of the 1997 Humana Festival of New American Plays, a widely attended yearly event at the Actors Theatre of Louisville. Though it never had a Broadway appearance, it has been Dietz's most commercially successful play.
