= Larry Atlas =

American dramatist

Larry Atlas (born 1948 Cleveland, Ohio) is the author of eight produced plays, and the novel South Eight. He is best known for the award-winning play Yield of the Long Bond, which premiered at the Matrix Theatre in Los Angeles starring Ian McShane and Byron Jennings. He directed the second production of this play at NY Stage and Film with Jennings, David Strathairn, and Kyra Sedgwick. Also noteworthy is Total Abandon, which was produced on Broadway starring Richard Dreyfuss and John Heard.

The other produced plays are Sonnetteer, Sweet Talker, Subject Animal and Permanent.

== Education ==
Atlas attended Bennington College, and has taught at Vassar, Hunter and Bennington.

== Book author and screenwriter ==
He is the author of the novel South Eight (Webatuck Press, 2022). As a screenwriter Atlas has worked on almost two dozen Hollywood studio projects, including Sleepless in Seattle.

== Actor and television appearances ==
A former actor, he appeared in numerous plays in New York and regionally, and in principal or lead roles in such films as King of America, Cruising, Firstborn, The Children's War, and Indio. Appearances on television included Kate and Allie, Another World, Out of the Darkness, Police Brass and many others.

== Video ==
Atlas was instrumental in inventing the first method for creating fully hyperlinked video, and wrote and directed the first movie employing this technology, "The Onyx Project," starring David Strathairn, released in Fall of 2006.

== Personal life ==
He lives in upstate New York with his wife, Ann.
