= Steven Dietz =

American playwright and theatre director

Steven Dietz (born June 23, 1958) is an American playwright, theatre director, and teacher. Dietz has written over 40 plays and adaptations, including God's Country, Lonely Planet, and Bloomsday. Dietz taught in the MFA Playwriting and Directing programs at the University of Texas at Austin from 2006 to 2018.

== Life and career ==
Steven Dietz was born in Denver. He attended Kennedy High School and studied theatre arts at the University of Northern Colorado. After his studies, he moved to Minneapolis and worked as a writer and a director of new plays at The Playwrights' Center and other local theaters. His first play was Brothers and Sisters in 1981. Dietz moved to Seattle in 1991.

From 2006 to 2018, Dietz was faculty at the University of Texas at Austin in the Department of Theatre and Dance. At UT/Austin, Dietz created an annual new play showcase, as well as co-created a new MFA Directing program. Among his students were Luke Leonard, George Brant, Martin Zimmerman, and Abe Koogler.

Dietz is described as a versatile and prodigious playwright: Robert Faires wrote in 2008, "His output is prodigious, some 30 plays in 25 years, and at a point when other playwrights might be winding down, he still steadily generates a couple of plays a year." Dietz's plays are frequently produced in regional theaters.

Dietz's play *Shooting Star* was adapted by Dietz, Kirk Lynn, and Meg Ryan for the film What Happens Later.

== Awards ==
Dietz is the recipient of the PEN Center USA Award in Drama (for Lonely Planet in 1994); a grant from the Kennedy Center Fund for New American Plays (Fiction and Still Life With Iris); and the 2007 Edgar Allan Poe Award for Best (Mystery) Play (Sherlock Holmes: The Final Adventure). He was awarded a New Play citation in 2016 from the American Theatre Critics Association for Bloomsday.

According to the Theatre Communications Group, Dietz was in the top 20 most produced playwrights in the 2019–2020 season (with nine productions) and the 2024–2025 season (with eight productions).

== Personal life ==
As of 2018, Dietz is married to fellow playwright Allison Gregory. They live in both Seattle and Austin, Texas.

== Works ==
=== Original plays (by year of first production) ===
- Brothers and Sisters (1981)
- Railroad Tales (1983)
- Random Acts (1983)
- Wanderlust (1984)
- More Fun Than Bowling (1986)
- Painting It Red (1986) (music by Gary Rue and Leslie Ball)
- Burning Desire (1987) (short play)
- Foolin' Around with Infinity (1987)
- Ten November (1987) (music by Eric Bain Peltoniemi)
- God's Country (1988) (Revised: 2021)
- Happenstance (1989) (music by Eric Bain Peltoniemi)
- After You (1990) (short play)
- Halcyon Days (1991)
- To The Nines (1991) (short play)
- Trust (1992)
- Lonely Planet (1993)
- Handing Down the Names (1994)
- The Nina Variations (1996) (variations on the last scene of Chekhov's The Seagull)
- Private Eyes (1996)
- Still Life with Iris (1997)
- Rocket Man (1998)
- Fiction (2002)
- Left to Right (2002) (short)
- Inventing van Gogh (2004)
- Last of the Boys (2004)
- The Spot (2004) (short)
- September Call-Up (2006) (short)
- Yankee Tavern (2007)
- Shooting Star (2008)
- Becky's New Car (2008)
- Rancho Mirage (2012)
- Mad Beat Hip & Gone (2013)
- On Clover Road (2015)
- Bloomsday (2015)
- This Random World (2016)
- Drive All Night (2018) (short)
- The Great Beyond (2019)
- The Ghost of Splinter Cove (2019)
- How a Boy Falls (2020)

=== Plays adapted from other sources ===
- The Rememberer (1994) (from the unpublished memoirs of Joyce Simmons Cheeka)
- Silence (1995) (from Shusaku Endo's novel)
- Dracula (1996) (from Bram Stoker)
- Force of Nature (1999) (after Elective Affinities by Goethe)
- Go, Dog. Go! (2003) (from the children's book) – a musical adaptation co-written with his wife, Allison Gregory.
- Over The Moon (2003) (after "The Small Bachelor" by P.G. Wodehouse)
- Paragon Springs (2004) (from "An Enemy of the People" by Ibsen)
- Honus & Me (2005) (from Dan Gutman)
- Sherlock Holmes: The Final Adventure (2006) (from William Gillette and Arthur Conan Doyle)
- Jackie & Me (2013) (from Dan Gutman)
- American la Ronde (2017) (from Arthur Schnitzler's 1900 play, Reigen or La Ronde)
- Dracula: Mina's Quest (2019) (from Bram Stoker)
- Murder on the Links (2023) (from Agatha Christie)
- Gaslight (2023) (from Patrick Hamilton)
- Peril in the Alps (2024) (from Agatha Christie)

=== Screenplays ===
- What Happens Later (2023) (from Shooting Star)
