= Sunil Kuruvilla =

Canadian playwright

Sunil Kuruvilla is a Canadian playwright from Waterloo, Ontario. He is most noted for his play Rice Boy, which was a shortlisted finalist for the Governor General's Award for English-language drama at the 2003 Governor General's Awards.

Educated at Wilfrid Laurier University, the University of Windsor and Yale University, he first emerged as a playwright in the early 1990s when he won a Shaw Festival competition with his play Fight of the Century. His plays Bulldogs and Firetrucks (1994) and Ears to Glass, Glass to Ground (1996) were both selected for the prestigious Vancouver New Play Festival.

Rice Boy was first staged by the Yale Repertory Theatre in 2000 while Kuruvilla was a student there, and received a production in Los Angeles by The Actors' Gang in 2001. In 2001, his play Fighting Words was staged by Toronto's Factory Theatre, and his play Minus 1 was staged at the Toronto Fringe Festival. In 2002, his play Snapshot was staged in Louisville, Kentucky.

Rice Boy was produced by Canadian Stage in 2003, and was a Governor General's Award nominee that year following its publication by Playwrights Canada Press.

In 2009, Rice Boy was staged by the Stratford Festival, the festival's first-ever production of a play about the immigrant experience. At that time, Kuruvilla was named one of Wilfrid Laurier University's . top 100 graduates in the university's 100 year history. Since then, he has become a television writer and college professor.
