= Marisol (play) =

Play written by José Rivera

- Written by: José Rivera
- Original language: English
- Setting: New York City. The present. Winter.

Premiere
- Date premiered: March 13, 1992
- Place premiered: Humana Festival of New American Plays, Louisville, Kentucky

Marisol is a play in two acts written by the Puerto Rican playwright José Rivera. The work earned Rivera a 1993 Obie Award for playwriting.

== Synopsis ==
Marisol Perez, a young Puerto Rican woman, is a copy editor for a Manhattan publisher. Although she has elevated herself into the white collar class, she continues to live alone in the dangerous Bronx neighborhood of her childhood. As the play begins, Marisol narrowly escapes a vicious attack by a golf club-wielding madman while traveling home on the subway. Later that evening Marisol is visited by her guardian angel who informs her that she can no longer serve as Marisol's protector because she has been called to join the revolution already in progress against an old and senile God who is dying and "taking the rest of the universe with him." The war in heaven spills over into New York City, reducing it to a smoldering urban wasteland where giant fires send noxious smoke to darken the skies, where the moon has not been seen in months, where the food has been turned to salt, and water no longer seeks its level. Alone, without her protector, Marisol begins a nightmare journey into this new war zone where she is attacked by a man with an ice cream cone demanding back pay for his extra work on the movie Taxi Driver. Marisol finds herself on the streets, homeless, where her many encounters include a woman beaten for exceeding her credit limit and a homeless burn victim in a wheelchair looking for his lost skin. With the apocalypse well under way, the angels have traded in their wings for Uzis and wear leather motorcycle jackets and fatigues. As the action builds to a crescendo, the masses of homeless and displaced people join the angels in the war to save the universe.

== Dramaturgy ==
Some find Rivera's play to follow not only in the tradition of magical realism but also of the Theatre of the Absurd as defined by Martin Esslin. There are clearly elements of the likes of Eugène Ionesco, Samuel Beckett, and French playwright Jean Genet, especially. Genet's The Balcony seems to have greatly influenced much of Rivera's tone and narrative structure.
