= Bob: A Life in Five Acts =

2012 play by Peter Sinn Nachtrieb

Bob: A Life in Five Acts is a play written by actor and playwright Peter Sinn Nachtrieb. The play was the winner of the 2010 Barrie and Bernice Stavis Award from the National Theatre Conference. It follows the life and adventures of Bob, a man certain of his destiny for greatness, as he struggles to find his purpose. Divided into five acts, each section of the play corresponds with a period in Bob's life. In 2012, it was published by Dramatists Play Service, Inc.

== Plot ==
=== Act One ===
“How Bob is born, abandoned, discovers his dream, and almost dies.” Bob's birth mother, Helen, unaware that she is pregnant, goes into labor at a White Castle, leaving Bob on the bathroom floor. Bob is subsequently discovered by Jeanine, an infertile waitress who received fortune cookie that she would be the mother to “a great man,” decides to raise the child as her own. Determined to fulfill the prophecy, Jeanine educates Bob by raising him in her Chevy Malibu as she drives around the country, stopping at notable points where American legends achieved their greatness. Just as Bob decides that his dream is to be immortalized on a plaque, Jeanine dies on the steps of the Art Institute of Chicago and begs Bob to burn her body. Bob does so, only to be questioned by a policeman named Connor, Jeanine's ex-boyfriend. Upon realizing the body is Jeanine's, Connor gives Bob a wedding ring intended for Jeanine and leaves. Then, a manic Helen appears and steals all of Bob's belongings, including his pants – unaware that he is her son. Bob then falls into the back of a truck and travels across the country, unconscious.

=== Act Two ===
“How Bob does not die, comes of age at a rest stop, pursues his dream, falls in love and has his heart broken.” Bob awakes on the ground of the William Borroughs Memorial Rest Stop in Mound City, Missouri. His many encounters with passersby inspire him to find his purpose, hoping to be immortalized on a plaque for his dedication to taking care of the rest stop. He enters puberty and falls in love with a socialite named Amelia. Amelia, who is also trying to find her sense of purpose by accomplishing a list of wild tasks prior to her arranged wedding, decides to stay with Bob for a couple weeks. However, she ultimately decides to leave him in order to accomplish her dream - most especially filling a jar with water from the Pacific Ocean - on her own. Unbeknownst to Bob, she does so at the cost of her life, and dies on a raft in the Pacific Ocean. Bob is heartbroken at his breakup, but determined to find his own call to greatness as well.

=== Act Three ===
“How Bob journeys across America, tries to do everything on his list, fails, meets an important man, and turns his back on everything he believes.” Act three begins as four waitresses use Bob for sex, revolting him. He fails to accomplish any of the ideas on his list, leading him to homelessness and to seek shelter on a box car. There, he encounters a washed-up circus animal trainer named Gunther Roy. After a series of flashbacks, Gunther relates how he ended up in the box car. He tricked an aspiring animal trainer into sleeping with him, abandoned her, and caused her to be blacklisted for every respectable animal training job. The woman later calls Gunther to tell him that his act resulted in a baby boy which she left in a White Castle restaurant, and casts a curse on him, causing Gunther Roy to be unable to train ever again. Back on the boxcar, the two men realize that the woman was Bob's mother, Helen, and that they are father and son. Immediately after realizing this, an angry pack of wolves approaches the boxcar, and Gunther jumps into the pack so that he can save his son. Bob, broken after so many losses, curses America and decides to live a selfish life.

=== Act Four ===
“How Bob has a turn of luck, becomes a new man, achieves a false dream, meets an important woman, and is redeemed.” As revealed through his interaction with a girl scout named Vera, Bob wandered through the desert until he found “The Martin Luther Casino.” He then bet the only item he had - Connor's ring - on a game of roulette. After an uncanny streak of luck, he made a fortune and became the owner of the casino, investing in stocks and living lavishly, though unhappily. However, Bob's interaction with Vera unsettles him and he decides to try to find his purpose once again. After 5 years of work, Bob carves his face into a block of granite in order to place it on Mount Rushmore, along with a plaque. After those who witness the monument are thoroughly underwhelmed, Bob sulks by his plaque when Helen appears with her trained wolf Sven, and reveals herself to be his mother at the same time that Bob realizes that she stole his pants outside of Chicago. Helen tells the story of her grievous life and how she married Connor, and then asks Bob if he is, in fact, a great man. Unimpressed with his whiny answer, Helen inspires Bob to live his life valiantly just before dying in his arms.

=== Act Five ===
“The rest.” Chorus members reveal that Bob achieved legendary status, after his former butler Tony wrote a book about Bob that Oprah Winfrey loved. Many characters reappear to speak about how Bob changed their lives. However, Bob seemed to have disappeared. Only one person - a tourist named Leo - is known to have seen Bob again. At a terrible rest top in Mexico, Bob reveals to Leo that he found Amelia's jar of water floating by the shore. Then, Bob convinces Leo to pay to see Bob's great act: a flea circus that tells his life story, concluding with the sentiment “I am not alone.”

== Style ==
Bob is notable for several stylistic decisions. First, the role of the chorus is vital. The cast is suggested to be 3 men and 2 women, but there are dozens of characters. Therefore, every actor, except for Bob, assumes many narrative and character roles. Furthermore, between every act is either a song or a dance. Peter Sinn Nachtrieb did not specify what these songs or dances should be, instead leaving them open to interpretation. Productions of Bob employ this freedom through everything from singing popular music or turning the production into a musical. Finally, the script is unique in how it uses comedy, referentiality, and Americana camp in order to address darker themes of death and obsession with legacy.

== Productions ==
- Developed with the support of the Playwrights Foundation, San Francisco.
- World Premiere March 2011 at The Humana Festival for New American Plays at Actors Theatre of Louisville
- NewScripts Reading at SCR October, 2009
- 'Rough' reading at Playwrights Foundation, SF January 2010
- Out Loud reading at Ars Nova, New York City May 2010
- Bob was commissioned by South Coast Repertory.
- More productions at B Street Theatre, Sacramento; Aurora Theatre, Georgia; Geva Theatre, NY; A.R.T. Institute Cambridge, MA, Duke University and others
