= Becky Shaw =

2008 play written by Gina Gionfriddo

- 2026 Broadway revival Playbill cover
- Original language: English
- Written by: Gina Gionfriddo
- Characters: Becky Shaw; Susan; Suzanna; Max; Andrew
- Genre: Comedy

Premiere
- Date: 2008
- Place: Humana Festival of New American Plays

Becky Shaw is a play written by Gina Gionfriddo. The play premiered at the Humana Festival of New American Plays, Kentucky, in 2008 and opened Off-Broadway in 2008. The play was a finalist for the 2009 Pulitzer Prize for Drama.

== Plot ==
The name of the play is a reference to Thackeray's title character Becky Sharp in his 1847–48 novel Vanity Fair. The play follows a disastrous blind date gone wrong between the titular character, Becky Shaw, and a man named Max. The date is set up by Max's long-time friend and one-time romantic partner Suzanna and her partner, Andrew, which leads to chaotic results.

== Productions ==
The play had its world premiere at the Humana Festival of New American Plays in Louisville, Kentucky, on February 29, 2008. The play was commissioned by the Actors Theatre of Louisville after the success of Gionfriddo's last play, After Ashley, at the 2004 Humana Festival. Directed by Peter Dubois, the cast featured Annie Parisse. Charles Isherwood reviewed the play for The New York Times, writing: "The new play marks an impressive stride for a writer with a saw-toothed wit and a seductive interest in exploring the rewards and responsibilities of emotional interdependence...Becky Shaw is a thoroughly enjoyable play, suspenseful, witty and infused with an unsettling sense of the potential for psychic disaster inherent in almost any close relationship."

After the play opened to critical acclaim at the Humana Festival, its Off-Broadway debut at Second Stage Theater's Tony Kiser Theater in the winter of 2008–09 was announced. Performances began at Second Stage on December 16, 2008, in previews, officially opening on January 8, 2009. This production saw the return of director Peter DuBois along with original cast members Annie Parisse (as Becky Shaw) and David Wilson Barnes. The cast featured Emily Bergl, Kelly Bishop, and Thomas Sadoski. Kelly Bishop was cast as Susan, a woman with MS who hooks up with a man much younger than herself, and quite disreputable. Susan, a domineering woman, also has quite a dysfunctional relationship with her daughter Suzanna (Emily Bergl) in the play. Due to positive reception and strong box office numbers, performances were extended through March 15, 2009.

Director Peter DuBois and Gionfriddo met at Brown University in the 1990s, and DuBois directed her thesis production (U.S. Drag) there; he has also directed her play Rapture, Blister, Burn.

=== Regional and international ===
The Wilma Theatre in Philadelphia, Pennsylvania produced the play from December 30, 2009, to February 7, 2010, directed by Anne Kauffman.

The Australian premiere was produced by Echelon Productions at the Melbourne Theatre Company's Lawler Studio opening on October 27, 2010. The production was directed by Indira Carmichael and starred Daniel Frederiksen, Amanda Levy, Alex Papps, Kate Atkinson and Judith Roberts. The play received its British premiere Off West End at the Almeida Theatre from January 13 (previews)/20 to March 5, 2011; with Barnes reprising Max, and Daisy Haggard as Becky, Anna Madeley as Suzanna.

The San Francisco Playhouse produced the play from January 24 to March 10, 2012. It was directed by Amy Glazer.

=== 2026 Broadway production ===
As part of Second Stage Theater's 2025–2026 season, Becky Shaw made its Broadway debut at the Hayes Theater with previews beginning on March 18, 2026, and regular performances beginning April 8, 2026. The production, directed by Trip Cullman, starred Madeline Brewer as Becky Shaw, Linda Emond as Susan, Lauren Patten as Suzanna, Alden Ehrenreich as Max and Patrick Ball as Andrew.

The production received positive reviews, with praise for the show's relevance and Ehrenreich and Emond's performances. The New York Times positively reviewed the play, noting it had "aged fittingly for where we find ourselves" with specific praise for Ehrenreich's "show-stopping" performance. Variety similarly praised the production, singling out Ehrenreich's performance as "astonishing", along with lauding Cullman's direction and Emond's performance. The production was nominated for Best Revival of a Play and Best Featured Actor in a Play (Ehrenreich) at the 79th Annual Tony Awards, with Ehrenreich being awarded his first Tony win.

== Original cast and characters ==
Character	World premiere (2008)	Off-Broadway (2009)	Broadway (2026)
Becky Shaw	Annie Parisse	Annie Parisse	Madeline Brewer
Susan Slater	Janis Dardaris	Kelly Bishop	Linda Emond
Suzanna Slater	Mia Barron	Emily Bergl	Lauren Patten
Max Garrett	David Wilson Barnes	David Wilson Barnes	Alden Ehrenreich
Andrew Porter	Davis Duffield	Thomas Sadoski	Patrick Ball

== Awards and nominations ==
=== 2009 Off-Broadway production ===
Year	Award	Category	Nominee	Result	Ref.
2009	Pulitzer Prize for Drama		Gina Gionfriddo	Nominated	
2009	Outer Critics Circle Award	Outstanding New Off-Broadway Play		Nominated	
2009	Outer Critics Circle Award	John Gassner Award	Gina Gionfriddo	Won	
2009	Lucille Lortel Award	Outstanding Play		Nominated	
2009	Lucille Lortel Award	Outstanding Lead Actress in a Play	Annie Parisse	Nominated	
2009	Lucille Lortel Award	Outstanding Featured Actor in a Play	Thomas Sadoski	Nominated	
2009	Drama Desk Award	Outstanding Play		Nominated	

=== 2026 Broadway revival ===
Year	Award	Category	Nominee	Result	Ref.
2026	Drama Desk Award	Outstanding Revival of a Play		Nominated	
2026	Drama Desk Award	Outstanding Featured Performance in a Play	Alden Ehrenreich	Won	
2026	Drama Desk Award	Outstanding Featured Performance in a Play	Linda Emond	Nominated	
2026	Drama Desk Award	Outstanding Direction of a Play	Trip Cullman	Nominated	
2026	Drama League Awards	Outstanding Revival of a Play		Nominated	
2026	Drama League Awards	Outstanding Direction of a Play	Trip Cullman	Nominated	
2026	Drama League Awards	Distinguished Performance	Alden Ehrenreich	Nominated	
2026	Outer Critics Circle Award	Outstanding Revival of a Play		Nominated	
2026	Outer Critics Circle Award	Outstanding Direction of Play	Trip Cullman	Nominated	
2026	New York Drama Critics' Circle Awards	Best Individual Performance	Alden Ehrenreich	Won	
2026	Tony Awards	Best Revival of a Play		Nominated	
2026	Tony Awards	Best Featured Actor in a Play	Alden Ehrenreich	Won	
2026	Dorian Award	Outstanding Broadway Play Revival		Nominated	
2026	Dorian Award	Outstanding Featured Performance in a Broadway Play	Alden Ehrenreich	Won	
2026	Dorian Award	Outstanding Featured Performance in a Broadway Play	Linda Emond	Nominated	
