= The POINT Community Development Corporation =

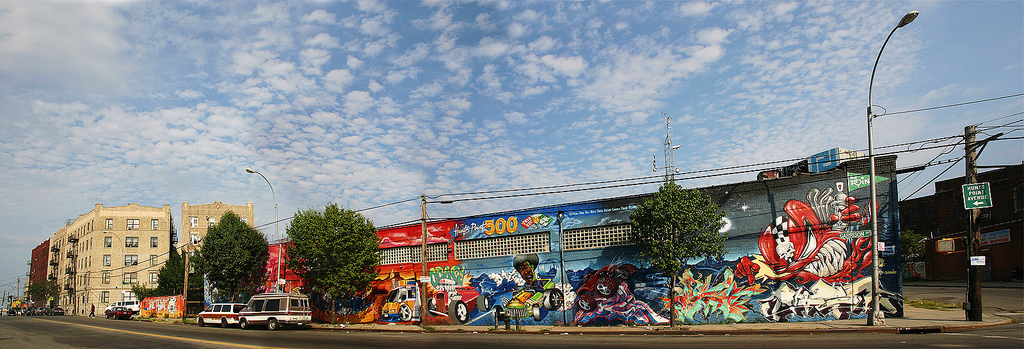
- The POINT Community Development Corporation's headquarters in Hunts Point, The Bronx
- Abbreviation: The POINT CDC
- Named after: Hunts Point, Bronx
- Formation: 1993; 33 years ago
- Founders: Maria Torres, Paul Lipson, Mildred Ruiz-Sapp & Steven Sapp
- Type: Community Development Corporation
- Legal status: 501(c)(3)
- Headquarters: 940 Garrison Avenue, Bronx, NY 10474-5335
- Location: The Bronx, New York City
- Services: youth development theater group, After-school activities, media arts,
- President: Maria Torres
- Executive Managing Director: Danny R. Peralta
- Expenses: $1,139,696 (2015)
- Website: thepoint.org

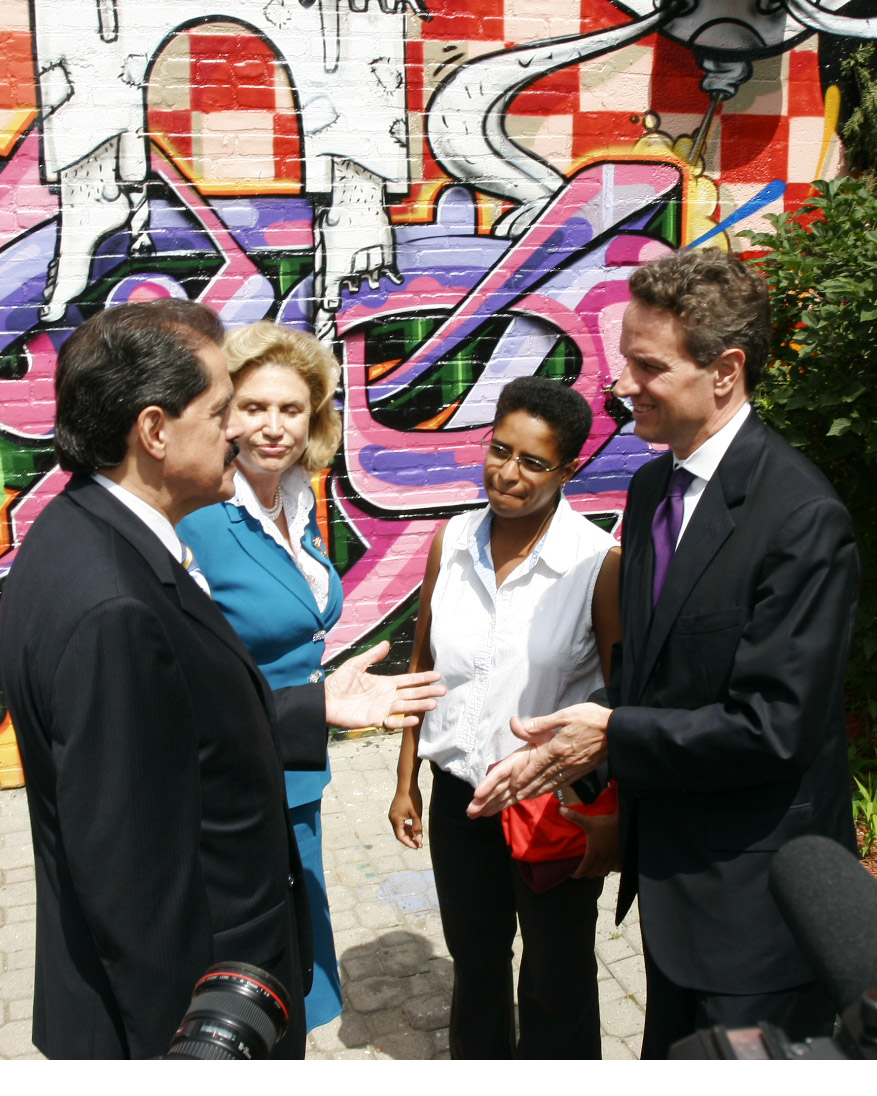
Congress members José E. Serrano (NY-16), Carolyn Maloney (NY-14), The Point CDC President Maria Torres, and Treasury Secretary Tim Geithner.

The POINT Community Development Corporation is a non-profit community development corporation dedicated to youth development, culture, and the economic revitalization of the Hunts Point neighborhood of the South Bronx, from which it takes its name. The mission of The POINT CDC is to encourage the arts, local enterprise, responsible ecology, and self-investment in the Hunts Point community. The organization was founded in 1993 by Steven Sapp, Maria Torres, Paul Lipson, and Mildred Ruiz-Sapp.

The POINT CDC is located in a former bagel factory and provides performance art space, visual art galleries, after-school programs, summer camps, circus classes, and community improvement programs.

During Majora Carter's time as a staff member, The POINT CDC was instrumental in the creation of Hunts Point Riverside Park.

The Corporation partners with other organizations such as

- The Bronx borough based ticket distributions for the New York Shakespeare Festival.
- Cirque du Soleil's outreach arm - Cirque du Monde, to provide performances and circus related workshops.
- New York City Parks Department - Creation of Concrete Plant Park transfer of South Brother Island to the New York City Parks Department, and the creation of the South Bronx Greenway.
- Bronx River Alliance - various initiatives supporting the Bronx River Greenway including the creation of pedestrian and bike bridges between Starlight Park and Concrete Plant Park.

The POINT CDC's motto is defined as its "theory of change": "People in the community create the community in which they want to live."

== Awards and honors ==
The POINT CDC has received the following awards and grants:

- 1999 OBIE Award Grant
- 1999 Bessie Awards Special Achievement/Citations

== See also ==
- Universes (theatre ensemble) - founded by two founders of The POINT CDC
- Martine Fougeron - presented photography of the South Bronx Trades at the POINT CDC.
- South Brother Island - The POINT CDC was involved in the transfer of the South Brother Island to the New York City Parks Department in 2007.
