= Steven Sapp =

- Born: Bronx, NY
- Occupation: Poet / Playwright / Actor / Director
- Website: universesonstage.com

Steven Sapp (born and raised in the South Bronx, New York) co-founded The POINT Community Development Corporation (Hunts Point) in 1993 and Universes (poetic theatre ensemble) in 1995, both in collaboration with Mildred Ruiz-Sapp.

== Theater credits ==
- Purgatory
- Another I Dies Slowly
- Live From the Edge
- Slanguage
- Blue Suite
- Ameriville
- Rhythmicity: Flipping The Script
- One Shot In Lotus Position
- The Ride
- The Denver Project
- Spring Training
- Party People
- UniSon

Playwright/Actor - AMERIVILLE (Director Chay Yew); The Denver Project (Curious Theater-Director Dee Covington); One Shot in Lotus Position (The War Anthology-Curious Theater-Director Bonnie Metzger); BLUE SUITE (Director-Chay Yew, previously Eyewitness Blues-NY Theatre Workshop-Director Talvin Wilks); RHYTHMICITY (Humana Festival); SLANGUAGE (NY Theater Workshop-Director Jo Bonney); Director - The Ride (playwright/Actor/Director); The Architecture of Loss (Assistant Director to Chay Yew); Will Powers’ The Seven (Director-The Univ. of Iowa); Alfred Jarry's UBU: Enchained (Director-Teatre Polski, Poland).

== Television credits ==
- HBO's Bored to Death
- HBO's Def Poetry Jam (Season 4- Episode 9, with UNIVERSES)

== Awards/Affiliations ==
- 2008 Jazz at Lincoln Center Rhythm Road Tour
- 2008 TCG - Theatre Communications Group - Peter Zeisler Award
- 2002 TCG - Theatre Communications Group - National Directors Award
- 2002-2004 and 1999-2001 TCG - Theatre Communications Group, National Theater Artist Residency Program Award
- 1999 OBIE Award Grant (The Point CDC & Live From Theater Theater)
- 1999 Bessie Awards (The Point CDC)
- 1998 and 2002 BRIO Awards (Bronx Recognizes its own-Performance) from the Bronx Council on the Arts
- 1998 Union Square Award recipient
- Van Lier Fellowship w/ New Dramatists
- Co-Founder of The Point CDC
- New York Theatre Workshop - Usual Suspect
- Bard College, BA 1989

Publications:

- UNIVERSES - THE BIG BANG (2010 release, TCG Books)
- SLANGUAGE in The Fire This Time (TCG).
