= Dramanon =

Indian theatre group

Dramatist Anonymous (Dramanon)
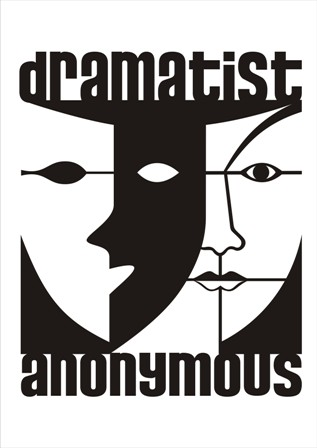

Comedy career
- Years active: 2001–present
- Medium: Theatre
- Website: http://www.dramanontheatre.com

Dramanon (short for Dramatist Anonymous) is an English language theatre group that operates out of three cities in India: Manipal, Bangalore and Hyderabad. Dramanon was founded in 1991 at Manipal Institute of Technology (MIT), Manipal. Additional chapters were formed in Bangalore, and Hyderabad.

Dramanon Bangalore has staged productions that include The Original Last Wish Baby, Pizzazz , Alarms and Excursions, Sic, and Elling.

Dramanon Hyderabad productions have included 6, Dramanon's first original play which comprises six short stories. Dramanon Hyderabad performed in the Samahaara Hyderabad Theatre and Short Film Festival 2010.

Dramanon as a group also conducts workshops for the community as well as for the corporate companies with customized training modules.
