= Party People (play) =

2009 play by UNIVERSES Theater Ensemble

Party People is a play conceived/written/composed by UNIVERSES Theater Ensemble and directed by Liesl Tommy, with instrumentation and sound design by Broken Chord and choreography by Millicent Johnny. It was originally commissioned by the Oregon Shakespeare Festival in 2009 and premiered at the festival in 2012. The production was then produced at Berkeley Repertory Theatre in 2014 and later at The Public Theater (NY) in 2016. It is an original work inspired by the revolutionary movements of the sixties and seventies, namely the Black Panther Party and The Young Lords.
