= Lonely Planet (play) =

Play written by Steven Dietz

Lonely Planet is a two character play written by Steven Dietz. The play tells the story of Jody and Carl, two gay men who live in an American city. The play was written during the midst of the AIDS epidemic, which is the central focus of the story. Ultimately the play sends the message that one should pay attention to the world around them and realize its problems rather than ignore it. The play heavily references the Eugène Ionesco comedy The Chairs.

== Plot ==
Jody, a gay man, owns a small map store on the oldest street in an American city, and is seemingly worldly and knowledgeable. Carl, another gay man is a frequent visitor to the store, is a friend of Jody, and seems to lie a lot about his life and occupation. Despite this, the two seemingly know very little about each other. The play begins with Jody explaining how he found a chair placed in his store one day, without notice, by Carl. Pretty soon, the store is littered with chairs, and after some argument between the two, it is revealed that every chair was owned by someone they knew in their community, who had died from the epidemic.

It becomes apparent that Jody hasn't left his store for months on end, rarely going outside and rather having things brought to him. Carl has placed the chairs in his store in hopes that Jody will realize that there are things going on in their community, and as a member Jody must bear witness and help the problem, rather than shun the world.

It is also revealed that Carl helps empty the residences of those taken by the epidemic, and can't stand to see the chairs abandoned and alone. Rather, he takes them to Jody's shop which is the biggest room he knows of. Carl succeeds in getting Jody to leave when he goes and gets tested for the first time. This leads to him taking a week off from the shop to see the world he abandoned and by the end finding out that he tested negative. However, a few months later, Carl's own chair appears in the shop and it becomes apparent that he will soon succumb to the disease. Now Carl has become the one who needs security, and Jody must pick up where Carl left off.

== Characters ==
Jody, a man in his forties.

Carl, a man in his early thirties.

== Themes ==
Lonely Planet, despite its quips and comedy is ultimately a play about mourning and being forgotten: Jody struggles to cope with how much physical space Carl's mourning takes up and Carl struggles with how much space his mourning take up in his mind. He finds it impossible to do anything but mourn, when so many people he knows are dying, he has to pay attention. Jody's mourning is just as present but less visible, but over the course of the work we see that it is paralyzing him. He cannot leave his shop without being confronted by the death of his community and so he makes the only choice he feels he can: he doesn't leave. There are also multiple discussions in the work of what happens when society abandons the dead and refuses to see them.

== Performances ==
Lonely Planet premiered at Northlight Theatre (with Russell Vandenbroucke as Artistic Director) in Evanston, Illinois in January 1993. Jody and Carl were played by William Brown and Phil Ridarelli, respectively. The play was also performed later that year in July by A Contemporary Theatre in Seattle, Washington, in February 1994 by The Barrow Group in New York City and the following year in June 1995 by Circle Repertory Company. Most recently it has been revived as an off-Broadway production by Keen Company, closing in November 2017. In this iteration of the work, Arnie Burton and Matt McGrath played Jody and Carl, respectively.

== Critical reception ==
The most recent revival of the play by New York City's Keen Company was positively reviewed by several newspapers. Reviewers praised Burton and McGrath's performances, saying they brought life and humour to the piece and carried the nuance and weight of the play well, results in an emotional touch that "sneaks up on you to devastating effect."

"But Mr. Dietz has something besides humor in mind (even if there is plenty of it) and that something — the weight of grief, the paralyzing fear of illness — emerges over the course of the show, like a photograph coming into focus in a dark room."

"Lonely Planet debuted in 1994, at the height of the AIDS crisis; its depiction of the plague years still hits hard. And it's hard to imagine a better cast than the stars of this revival, directed by Jonathan Silverstein for Keen Company. As the two characters spar with each other, mostly through inspired put-downs and bon mots, McGrath expertly parries Burton’s superlative sardonic takes. They duel as though their lives depended on it—which they ultimately might."
