= Naomi Wallace =

American playwright, screenwriter and poet (born 1960)

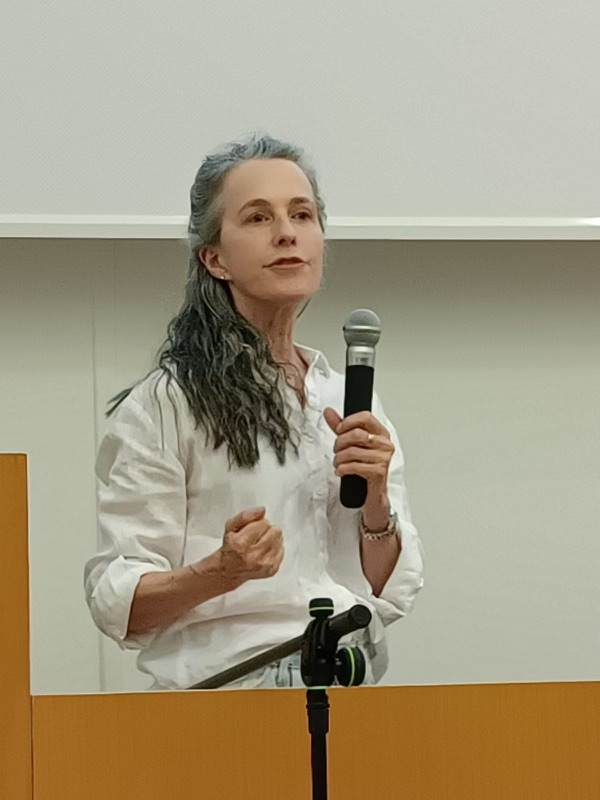
- Wallace at the University of Athens
- Born: 1960 (age 65–66); Prospect, Kentucky, U.S.
- Education: Hampshire College (BA); University of Iowa (MFA)
- Occupations: Playwright and screenwriter
- Partner: Bruce McLeod
- Children: 3
- Writing career
- Notable work: One Flea Spare
- Notable awards: Notable awards include the MacArthur Fellowship & Obie Award
- Website: naomiwallace.com

Naomi Wallace (born 1960) is an American playwright, screenwriter and poet from Kentucky. She is widely known for her plays, and has received numerous distinguished awards for her work.

== Biography ==
Naomi Wallace was born in Prospect, Kentucky, to Henry F. Wallace, a farmer, photojournalist and correspondent for Time and Life magazines, and Sonja de Vries, a Dutch justice and human rights worker.

Wallace obtained a Bachelor of Arts degree from Hampshire College. She then received two master's degrees from the University of Iowa. Currently, she divides her time between Kentucky and the Yorkshire Dales in Northern England (UK), where she lives with her partner, Bruce McLeod.

Wallace has taught English literature, poetry and play writing at Yale University, UCLA, Illinois State University, Merrimack College, American University of Cairo, Vrije Universiteit Amsterdam and other institutions. In 2024 Wallace lectured at the National and Kapodistrian University of Athens and the Aristotle University of Thessaloniki.

She has been called "a dedicated advocate for justice and human rights in the U.S. and abroad, and Palestinian rights in the Middle East," and her writing described as "muscular, devastating, and unwavering".

American Theater writes of her work, “Naomi Wallace speaks to, and for, the body as eloquently as any American writer since Walt Whitman.”

== Activism ==
In the mid-2000s, Wallace was briefly detained by the United States Department of Homeland Security after defying the ban on travel to Cuba.

In August 2016, Wallace was one of the Freedom Riders with the Women's Boat to Gaza.

She has also worked with women in the criminal justice system, and is a member of Showing up for Racial Justice.

Wallace is a member of Jewish Voice for Peace.

== Publications ==
Wallace's plays are published in the U.S. by Broadway Play Publishing Inc., Theatre Communications Group, Faber and Faber in the UK, and éditions Théâtrales in France. Wallace's work has been produced in the United States, the United Kingdom, Europe, and the Middle East.

== Awards ==
Wallace's work has received the Susan Smith Blackburn Prize twice, the Joseph Kesselring Prize, the Fellowship of Southern Writers Drama Award, and an Obie Award. She is also a recipient of the MacArthur Fellowship, and a National Endowment for the Arts development grant.

In 1993, Wallace won first price in the Chester H. Jones National Poetry Competition with the work "Meat Strike".

In 2009, One Flea Spare was incorporated into the permanent répertoire of the French National Theatre, the Comédie-Française, and produced there in 2012. Only two American playwrights have ever been added to La Comédie's repertoire in 300 years: the other being Tennessee Williams. The play was translated into French by Dominique Hollier.

In 2012, Wallace was a recipient of the Horton Foote Prize for most promising new American play.

In 2013, she was awarded the inaugural Windham–Campbell Literature Prize established at Yale University.

In 2015, Wallace received an Arts and Letters Award in Literature from the American Academy of Arts and Letters.

In 2025, Wallace was inducted into the Kentucky Writer's Hall of Fame.

In 2025, Troisième Bureau created the annual Naomi Wallace Award in Grenoble, France.

== Work ==
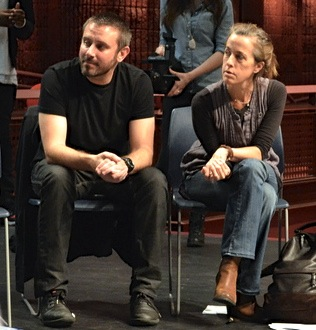
Jeremy Scahill and Naomi Wallace giving a writing workshop in New Haven, Connecticut.

=== Plays ===
- In The Heart of America
- One Flea Spare
- The Inland Sea
- Slaughter City
- The Trestle at Pope Lick Creek
- The Girl Who Fell Through a Hole in Her Jumper (with Bruce E. J. McLeod; licensed under the title The Girl Who Fell Through a Hole in Her Sweater in the United States)
- The War Boys
- Things of Dry Hours
- Birdy (an adaptation of William Wharton's novel)
- The Fever Chart: Three Visions of the Middle East
- Twenty One Positions: A Cartographic Dream of the Middle East (with Lisa Schlesinger and Abdelfattah Abusrour)
- The Hard Weather Boating Party
- One Short Sleepe
- And I and Silence
- The Liquid Plain
- Night is a Room
- Barrel Wave
- The Return of Benjamin Lay (produced at the Finborough Theatre with Marcus Rediker)
- The Breach
- Returning to Haifa (with Ismail Khalidi (writer))
- Guernica, Gaza (with Ismail Khalidi (writer))

=== Anthologies ===
- Inside/Outside: Six Plays from Palestine and the Diaspora
- Double Exposure: Plays of the Jewish and Palestinian Diasporas

=== Essays ===
- "Trump-ocalypse Now? Theater in the Age of Trump"
- "Radical Vision and Form" (interview)
- "Let the Right One In: On resistance, hospitality and new writing for the American stage"

=== Poetry ===
- To Dance A Stony Field (Peterloo Poets Press).

=== Films ===
- Lawn Dogs
- The War Boys, co-written with Bruce E. J. McLeod
- Flying Blind, co-written with Bruce E. J. McLeod

=== Other ===
- "In the Fields of Aceldama" in Best of The Fest, ed. Phil Setren. 1998, Aurora Metro Books.
