= Onyx Project =

The Onyx project is a venture aimed to create an interactive computer movie in nonlinear form. Viewers decide what they see in the beginning, middle and end of the movie, and is similar to Choose Your Own Adventure books, where the reader was given choices of how the story should progress.
