= Bondage (play) =

1992 play by David Henry Hwang

- Original language: English
- Written by: David Henry Hwang

Premiere
- Date: March 1, 1992
- Place: Actors Theatre of Louisville

Bondage is a 1992 play by American playwright David Henry Hwang. It deals with issues of race and racial stereotypes by placing a fully disguised man and woman in an S & M parlor engaging in sexual raceplay.

The play premiered as part of the Actors Theatre of Louisville's Humana Festival on March 1, 1992. It was shown in tandem with Suzan-Lori Parks' short play Devotees in the Garden of Love under the title Rites of Mating. It was directed by Oskar Eustis and featured B. D. Wong and Hwang's wife Kathryn Layng.

Bondage is published as part of Trying to Find Chinatown: The Selected Plays by Theatre Communications Group. and also in an acting edition published by Dramatists Play Service.
