= Gina Gionfriddo =

American playwright and television writer

- Born: 1969 or 1970 (age 56–57); Washington, D.C., U.S.
- Education: Barnard College (BA); Brown University (MFA)
- Occupations: Playwright; screenwriter
- Notable work: Becky Shaw (2008)

Gina Gionfriddo (born 1969 or 1970) is an American playwright and television writer. Her plays Becky Shaw and Rapture, Blister, Burn were finalists for the 2009 and 2013 Pulitzer Prize for Drama, respectively. She has written for the television series Law & Order, Law & Order: Criminal Intent, FBI: Most Wanted, The Alienist, and House of Cards.

== Biography ==
Gionfriddo grew up in Washington, D.C., where she attended Georgetown Day School. She received a Bachelor of Arts degree from Barnard College in 1991 and a Master of Fine Arts from Brown University in 1997. At Brown, she studied with playwright Paula Vogel.

In addition to writing her own material, she has also taught playwriting at Brown University, Providence College, and Rhode Island College.

She has lived in Providence, Rhode Island and currently resides in New York City, where she is a single mother.

== Work ==
Gionfriddo has written for both the stage and for television. She tends to write dark comedies of topics that occasionally touch on the abuse of women and often features male protagonists. U.S. Drag features a series of assaults, After Ashley features rape and murder, and Becky Shaw has a robbery at gunpoint.

=== Television ===
Gionfriddo was a writer for the television series Law & Order. René Balcer, the head writer and executive producer of Law & Order, hired her after he read her play After Ashley. Balcer said: “She really has an ear for the dialogue of everyday Americans and the quirkiness of everyday Americans... the kind of people you see being interviewed on Nancy Grace.”

=== Stage ===
Gionfriddo received the Susan Smith Blackburn Prize in 2002 for her play U.S. Drag (in a tie with Susan Miller), the 2002 Helen Merrill Award for Emerging Playwrights, and a 2005 Guggenheim Fellowship. Director Peter DuBois and Gionfriddo met at Brown University in the 1990s, and DuBois directed her thesis production (U.S. Drag) there. He has directed her plays Rapture, Blister, Burn, Becky Shaw, and Can You Forgive Her?

U. S. Drag was presented by the Connecticut Repertory Theatre Playwrights' Lab in Storrs, Connecticut in July 1998 in a workshop, directed by Anna Shapiro. The play was next produced by Clubbed Thumb at the HERE Arts Center, New York City in June 2001. The play was directed by Pam MacKinnon. It was produced off-Broadway from February 23, 2008, to March 16, 2008, by the stageFARM at the Beckett Theatre, directed by Trip Cullman.

Gionfriddo's play After Ashley received the 2005 Obie Award for Performance for Kieran Culkin.

Becky Shaw, which premiered off-Broadway in 2008, was a finalist for the 2009 Pulitzer Prize for Drama. The play was revived on Broadway at the Helen Hayes Theatre in 2026, starring Madeline Brewer, Lauren Patten, Patrick Ball, Alden Ehrenreich and Linda Emond. The production was nominated for the 2026 Tony Award for Best Revival of a Play.

Gionfriddo's play Rapture, Blister, Burn premiered off-Broadway at Playwrights Horizons in June 2012. The original off-Broadway cast, which featured Amy Brenneman and Lee Tergesen, performed the play at the Geffen Playhouse in Los Angeles in August 2013. The play was a finalist for the 2013 Pulitzer Prize for Drama.

Can You Forgive Her? premiered in Boston at the Huntington Theatre in March 2016. It was directed by Peter Dubois.

Gionfriddo's play The Silence of the Lambs, based on Thomas Harris's novel of the same name will make its world premiere at Curve, Leicester in August 2026 before touring the UK and Ireland.

== Plays ==
- Safe (2000) (short)
- Guinevere (2001)
- U.S. Drag (2001) (Originally produced by Clubbed Thumb)
- After Ashley (2004)
- Squalor (2007) (short)
- Becky Shaw (2008)
- Rapture, Blister, Burn (2012)
- Can You Forgive Her? (2016)
- The Silence of the Lambs (2026)

== Television ==
- House of Cards (2013)
- Law & Order (Episodes: "Betrayal", "Driven", "Executioner", "Bogeyman", "Lost Boys")
- Law & Order: Criminal Intent (Episodes: "Country Crossover", "Masquerade", "Vacancy", "Dollhouse", "Prisoner", "Beast", "Bombshell")
- Cold Case (Episode: "Schadenfreude")
- Law & Order True Crime (Episodes 3 and 6, season 1)
- The Alienist (Episodes 3 and 4, season 1)

== Awards and nominations ==
Year	Award	Category	Work	Result	Ref.
2005	Outer Critics Circle Award	John Gassner Award	After Ashley	Nominated	
2009	Pulitzer Prize for Drama		Becky Shaw	Nominated	
2009	Outer Critics Circle Award	John Gassner Award	Becky Shaw	Won	
2009	Drama Desk Award	Outstanding Play	Becky Shaw	Nominated	
2013	Pulitzer Prize for Drama		Rapture, Blister, Burn	Nominated	
2026	Tony Award	Best Revival of a Play	Becky Shaw	Nominated	
