= Hazzard County (play) =

Hazzard County is a full-length comedy-drama, written by Allison Moore, which premiered in 2005 at the Humana Festival of New American Plays.

The story centers on a young widowed mother and a visit she receives from a big city television producer. Interspersed with recollections of Bo, Luke, and Daisy, the play takes a deep look at southern "Good Ole Boy" culture and its popularization through the lens of American mass media

== Characters ==
- Ruth - Widow, almost 30. White.
- Quinn - Ruth's son, eight
- Quintin - Ruth's daughter, eight
- Camille - Ruth's Cousin, older, hardened.
- Blake - 30 -35, TV producer from Los Angeles, of indeterminate heritage

=== The Monologues ===
Note: The following characters are sometimes played by Quinn and Quintin.

- Chad - young, white, from an outer-ring suburb of Atlanta, GA.
- Jessica - 20's white, from Manitoba, Canada.
- Tim - 40's, white, professional from Kansas City
- Martin - 30's-50's, white, Ivy League professor
- Jeffery - 30's, white, urban professional, native of South Carolina, transplanted to Providence, RI
- Cherilynne - 60's, white, gracious southern lady.

== Setting ==
A rural town in Kentucky, present day.

== Synopsis ==
Ruth, a young widow has recently been thrown out of her home. She is unable (or unwilling) to access the trust fund set up after her husband's (Michael) death. The story of her husband's murder comes out after meeting Blake, a producer from LA. Blake sees this as the story that will help him break into the bigtime - "The story of a young woman, doing the right thing under impossible circumstances." However the story becomes less clear cut as more information about the murder is revealed. The killers were black, the money in the trust fund may have come from white supremacist groups, and Michael was flying a Confederate flag on his truck the night he was shot. The question is raised - "Whose civil rights were violated first?" as we follow Ruth, her children, and the rest of the cast down a memory lane speckled with stereotypes.

== Themes ==
This play is based on a true story. In 1995, Michael Westerman was shot in his truck near Guthrie, Kentucky. He was, at the time, flying a Confederate flag on the back of his truck. Later, he was declared a martyr by the Sons of Confederate Veterans - "First man to die under the flag in 130 years." When asked about the flag, the shooter responded "I thought it was just the 'Dukes of Hazzard' sign."
