= William Ruiz =

- Born: Bronx, NY
- Occupation: Poet/Playwright/Actor
- Website: www.universesonstage.com

William Ruiz is a playwright, poet, and actor from the Bronx. Born and raised on the Lower East Side of Manhattan, William (a.k.a. Ninja) is a core member of the theater ensemble Universes.

== Theater Credits Include ==
- Ti-Jean Blues
- Waiting for Gordo
- Slanguage
- Ameriville
- Party People
- UniSon

== Awards/Affiliations ==
2008 Jazz at Lincoln Center Rhythm Road Tour;
Bard College, BA ’98.
Publications: UNIVERSES-THE BIG BANG (2017 release- TCG Books);
