= Julie Jensen McDonald =

American author and educator

- Born: Julie Jensen; June 22, 1929; Near Fiscus, Iowa, US
- Died: November 25, 2013 (aged 84); Pleasant Valley, Iowa, US
- Occupation(s): Author, educator

Julie Jensen McDonald (June 22, 1929 – November 25, 2013) was an American author and educator. Her works include novels and a book about small towns in Iowa and Illinois. She won multiple awards for her work.

== Personal life and early career ==
McDonald was born on June 22, 1929, and was born a mile away from Fiscus, Iowa, on a farm. After her father Alfred Jensen died in a tractor accident, McDonald and her mother Myrtle moved to Harlan, Iowa, where she attended elementary school. She became interested in writing as a child and her mother would read McDonald's stories. In sixth grade, McDonald wrote a school play titled "The Whispering Mummy" and its reception encouraged McDonald to write another play. The second play was not as well received as the first one so McDonald decided to write poetry instead. After writing poetry for a few years, McDonald decided to become a journalist. McDonald was unable to join her high school newspaper, but she became an unpaid apprentice at a weekly newspaper. She attended the University of Iowa for journalism and graduated with a bachelor's degree. For one year, McDonald was the woman's editor for the Rockford Register Star in Rockford, Illinois. In the 1950s, McDonald acted for two productions by the Quad City Music Guild. On May 16, 1952, she married Elliott R. McDonald and they first had a daughter named Beth. When Beth was a few weeks old and they were living in Washington, D.C., McDonald decided to write fiction. They later had a son named Elliot Jr.

== Later career and organizations ==
McDonald sold her first story titled The Birthday Cake to a Sunday school paper for US$6.50. The magazine Redbook bought two novels from her titled The Wives and Man Running. McDonald said that the first novel that Redbook bought "paid for a bright yellow convertible, trip to Europe, carpeting and central air for her home." She wrote a romance novel, but refused to say the title of it despite receiving royalties and fan letters. Her first paperback novel Amelie's Story was published in 1970 through Simon & Schuster. The book was followed by the sequel Petra. After writing about small towns for the newspaper Quad-City Times, she wrote a 1977 book titled Pathway to the Present in 50 Iowa and Illinois Communities. She wrote a 1980 biography about Ruth Buxton Sayre. McDonald taught writing to students in elementary and high school. She also taught journalism and fiction writing at St. Ambrose University. Her career spanned over 30 books and short stories. McDonald has won the Quad City Writer of the Year, the Johnson Brigham Award, the Friends of American Writers Award, the Isabel Bloom Award for the Arts, the Davenport Public Library's Authors' Achievement Award, and the David R. Collins Literary Achievement Award. In 2012, McDonald retired after writing for the Rock Island Argus.

Governor Robert D. Ray appointed McDonald as the chairperson of the Iowa Arts Council in 1969 and she served until 1973. She was a Davenport Art Museum trustee and later part of the committee for the Figge Art Museum. McDonald worked for the Midwest Writer's Center as its director. She played the clarinet in the Bettendorf Park Band for more than 40 years. McDonald was also part of the Penwomen, the Danish Sisterhood, the Scottish American Society, among others.

== Death ==
McDonald died on November 25, 2013, in the Iowa township Pleasant Valley.
