= Chay Yew =

American dramatist

- 谢耀
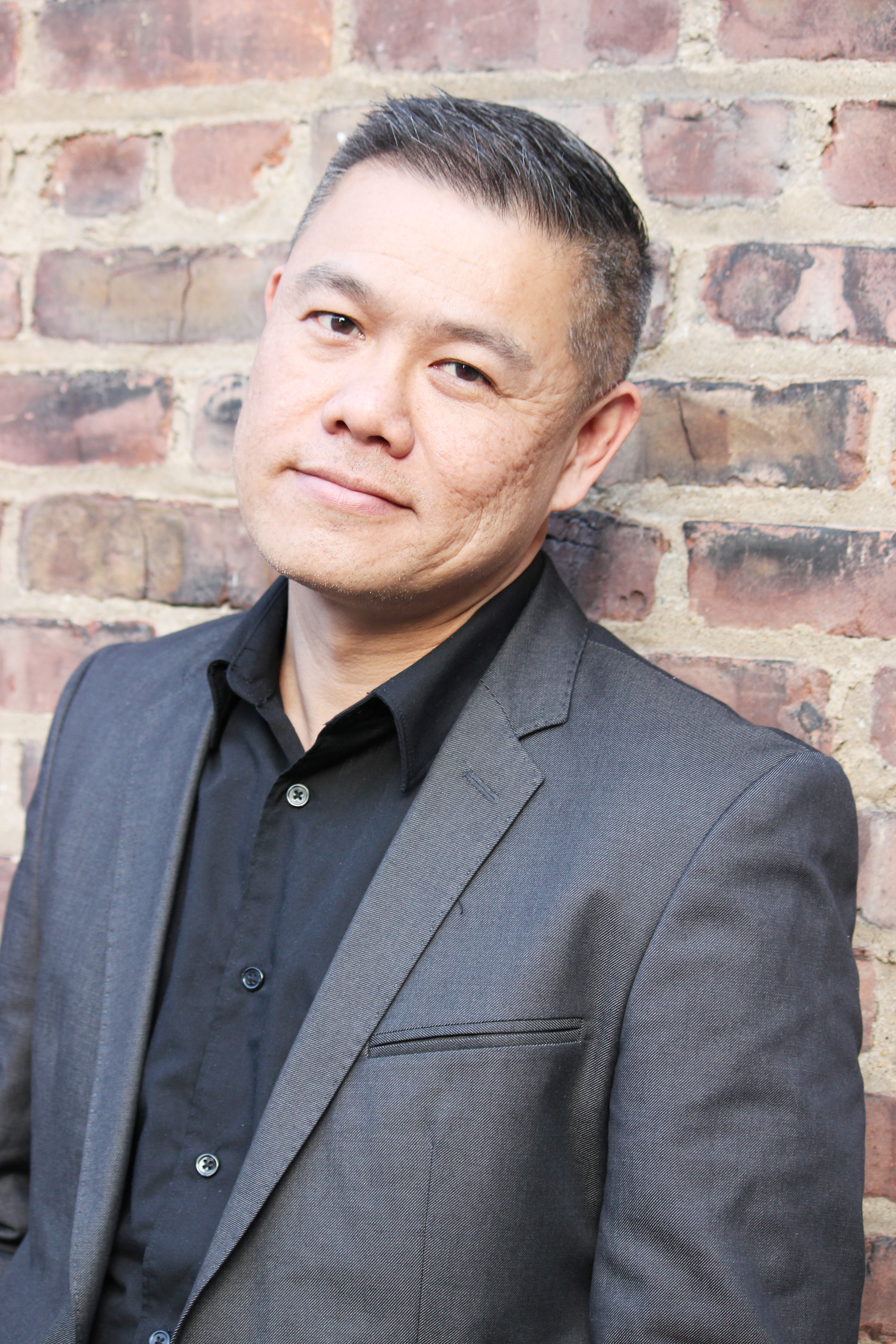
- Yew in 2011
- Born: 22 April 1971 (age 55); Singapore
- Education: Boston University; Pepperdine University
- Known for: Theatre, Performing Arts
- Notable work: Porcelain, A Language of Their Own, A Beautiful Country, Red, Wonderland
- Awards: Obie Award for Direction, 2024 Doris Duke Artist, and Boston University’s Dean’s Arts & Humanities Award

Chay Yew (simplified Chinese: 谢耀; traditional Chinese: 謝耀; pinyin: Xiè Yào) is a playwright and stage director who was born in Singapore. He was artistic director of the Victory Gardens Theater in Chicago from 2011 to 2020.

== Career ==
Chay Yew's breakthrough work came from his early plays Porcelain and A Language of Their Own, which, along with Wonderland, make up what Yew calls the Whitelands Trilogy. Other plays include As if He Hears; Red; A Beautiful Country; Question 27, Question 28; A Distant Shore; Vivien and the Shadows; and Visible Cities. His adaptations include A Winter People (based on Anton Chekhov's The Cherry Orchard); Federico García Lorca's The House of Bernarda Alba.; Ibsen's Dollhouse; and The House of Baluyot, after Aeschylus' Oresteia.

In 1989, the government in Singapore banned his first play As If He Hears because the gay character acted "too sympathetic and too straight-looking". Yew's plays appear in numerous anthologies, and two collections of his plays have been published by Grove Press. Yew also edited an anthology of contemporary Asian American plays, "Version 3.0", for Theatre Communications Group Publications.

His plays have been produced by many theaters, including the New York Shakespeare Festival/Public Theater in New York City, Mark Taper Forum, Manhattan Theatre Club, Wilma Theatre, Long Wharf Theatre, La Jolla Playhouse, Intiman Theatre, Portland Center Stage, East West Players, Cornerstone Theatre Company, amongst others. Overseas, his work has been produced by the Royal Court Theatre (London, UK); Fattore K and Napoli Teatro Festival (Naples, Italy); La Mama (Melbourne, Australia); Shanghai Dramatic Arts Center (Shanghai, China); Four Arts (Kuala Lumpur, Malaysia); and Wild Rice, Singapore Repertory Theatre, Toy Factory, Checkpoint Theatre, and TheatreWorks (Singapore).

For his plays, he is the recipient of the London Fringe Award for Best Playwright and Best Play, George and Elisabeth Marton Playwriting Award, GLAAD Media Award, APGF Community Visibility Award, Made in America Award, AEA/SAG/AFTRA 2004 Diversity Honor, and Robert Chesley Award; he has also received grants from the Rockefeller MAP, McKnight Foundation and the TCG/Pew National Residency Program.

As a director, his New York production credits include the Public Theater, New York Theatre Workshop, Signature Theatre, Playwrights Horizons, New York City Center Encores!, The Flea, Rattlestick, Playwrights Realm, Audible Theatre, Ensemble Studio Theatre, National Asian American Theatre Company, Gala Hispanic Theatre, and Ma Yi Theatre. Regionally and internationally, he has directed for American Conservatory Theater, Kennedy Center, Long Wharf Theatre, Center Theatre Group, East West Players, Actors Theatre of Louisville, Goodman Theatre, Oregon Shakespeare Festival, Goodspeed Opera, Portland Center Stage, La Jolla Playhouse, Empty Space, Berkeley Rep, Seattle Rep, Singapore Repertory Theatre, Cornerstone Theatre Company, Huntington Theatre, South Coast Repertory Theatre, and Smithsonian Institution.

He also directed the world premieres of David Henry Hwang's and Osvaldo Golijov's Ainadamar at the Tanglewood Festival of Contemporary Music and Rob Zuidam's Rage D'Amors (Tanglewood); and the New York premiere of Huang Ruo's and David Henry Hwang's An American Soldier at Perelman Performing Arts Center.

His productions and plays have included such actors as Sandra Oh, Chita Rivera, Daniel Dae Kim, Ruthie Ann Miles, Raúl Castillo, Joel de la Fuente, Tsai Chin, Amy Hill, Dennis Dun, Tamlyn Tomita, Ali Ahn, Monica Raymund, BD Wong, Margaret Cho, William Jackson Harper, Raymond Lee, Garrett Wang, amongst others.

Yew has directed numerous world premiere productions by other writers, including Lauren Yee’s Cambodian Rock Band; Marcus Gardley’s Gospel of Lovingkindness at Victory Gardens and black odyssey at Denver Center Theatre; Lucas Hnath’s Hillary and Clinton at Victory Gardens; Naomi Iizuka's Strike-Slip at Actors Theatre of Louisville/Humana Festival and Citizen 13559 at the Kennedy Center; Luis Alfaro’s Oedipus el Rey and Mojada at the Public Theater; and Julia Cho's Durango at the Public Theater and Long Wharf Theatre.

In 2006, Yew participated in The Collision Project at The Alliance Theatre in Atlanta, Georgia. He wrote a documentary play 17 based on the actual lives of Atlanta’s racially diverse teenagers.

Chay Yew was the Artistic Director of Victory Gardens Theater in Chicago from 2011 to 2020. During his tenure, out of 43 productions, 18 plays received world premieres of which two went to Broadway, four were produced off-Broadway at the Public, Soho Rep, and Signature Theatre, while others were presented regionally, and abroad at Donmar Warehouse and Bush Theatre in London. For his leadership, he was awarded the Iris Award for Outstanding Commitment to Connecting Chicago Communities and the Arts, and the Impact Award for Bold and Inclusive Artistic Leadership.

For direction, Chay Yew is the recipient of the DramaLogue Award, 2020 Craig Noel Award; and OBIE Award for Direction. In 2022, Yew was featured in the book 50 Key Figures in Queer US Theatre, with a profile written by theatre scholar Dan Bacalzo.

Yew was also the Founder and Director of the Mark Taper Forum's Asian Theatre Workshop for ten years. An alumnus of New Dramatists, he has served on the Executive Board of the Stage Directors and Choreographers Society, Theatre Communications Group, Chicago’s Department of Cultural Affairs and Special Events’ Cultural Advisory Council, the League of Chicago Theatres, and the Executive Board of the Consortium of Asian American Theatre and Artists.

In 2024, Yew was the recipient of the Doris Duke Foundation Artist Award, and Boston University’s Dean’s Arts & Humanities Award.

== Selected plays ==
- As if He Hears (1988)
- Porcelain (1992)
- A Language of Their Own (1995)
- Half Lives (1996)
- Red (1998)
- A Beautiful Country (1998)
- Wonderland (1999), a revision of Half Lives
- Scissors (2000), short play, part of The Square, a series of shorts conceived by Yew for the Mark Taper Forum
- The House of Bernarda Alba (2000, adaptation of Federico García Lorca)
- Here and Now (2002), short play segment of Snapshot
- A Winter People (2002, adaptation of Anton Chekhov's The Cherry Orchard)
- A Distant Shore (2005)
- The Long Season (2005)
- Question 27, Question 28 (2006)
- Visible Cities (2011)
- Dollhouse (2021)
- The House of Baluyot (2023)

== Other References ==
- Interview with Chay Yew
- Chay Yew:Porcelain
- Review: The House of Bernarda Alba
