= Gamal Abdel Chasten =

American poet

- Born: New York City, United States of America
- Occupations: Poet, playwright and actor
- Website: http://www.universesonstage.com/

Gamal Abdel Chasten was born and raised on the Lower East Side of Manhattan, Gamal is a core member of Universes, a poetic theatre ensemble.

== Theater credits ==
- The Last Word
- God took away his Poem
- The Ride
- Slanguage
- Ameriville

== Awards/affiliations ==
- 2008 Jazz at Lincoln Center Rhythm Road Tour;
- Publications: UNIVERSES-THE BIG BANG (2010 release- TCG Books);
