= Kirk Lynn =

American dramatist

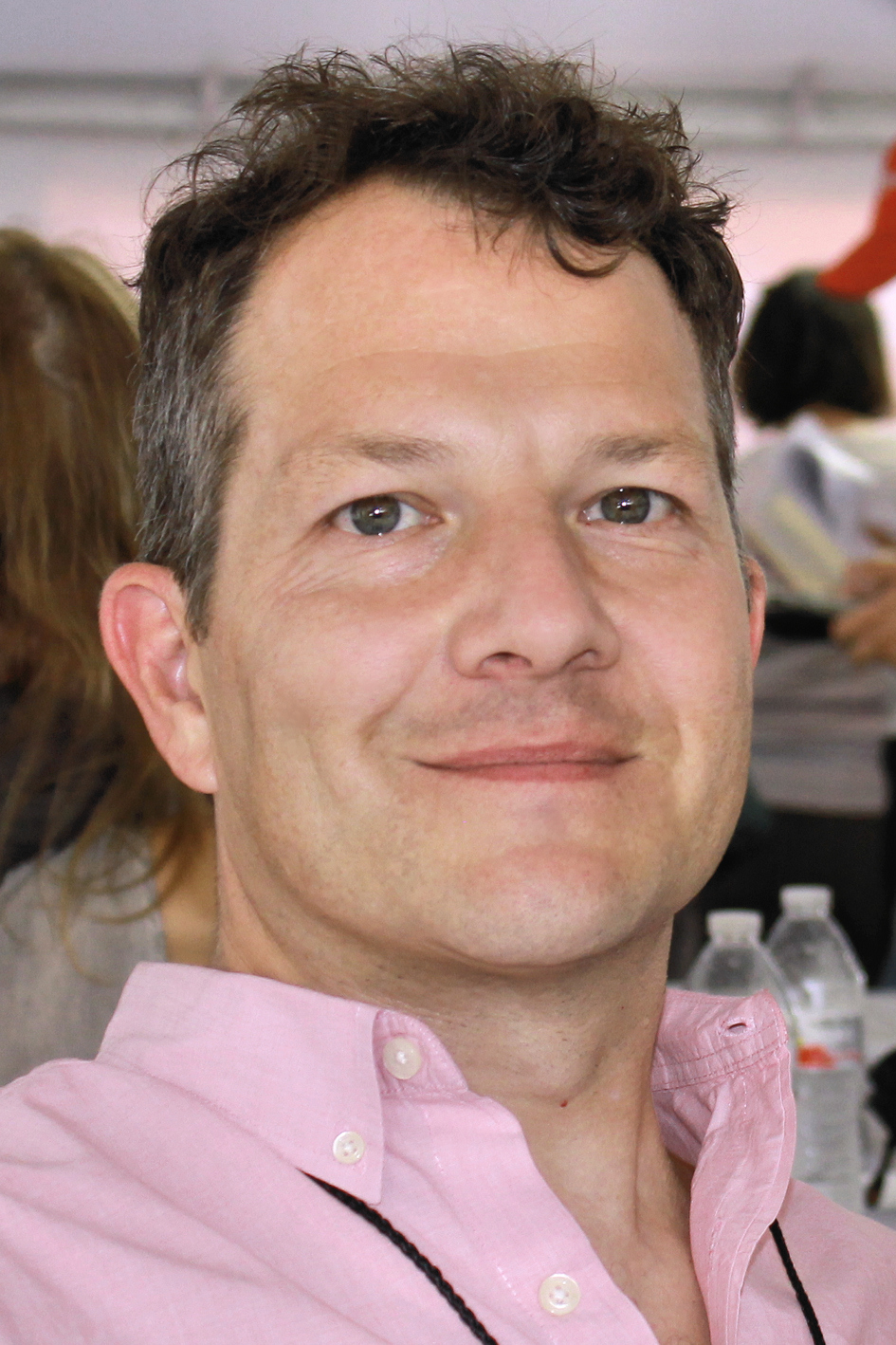
- Lynn at the 2015 Texas Book Festival
- Born: May 8, 1972 (age 54)
- Occupations: Playwright, novelist

Kirk Lynn (born May 8, 1972) is an American playwright and novelist who lives in Austin, Texas.

He is one of the founders of Rude Mechanicals theater company and has been worked with them since 1996. He published his first novel, Rules for Werewolves, in 2015.

In 2011, he was named one of the United States Artists Jeanne and Michael Klein Fellows in the category of Theater Arts.

Lynn is head of Playwriting and Directing in the Department of Theatre and Dance at the University of Texas at Austin. His playwriting work has included reworking a number of Shakespeare productions, as well as finishing The Emporium, which was a play by Thornton Wilder which was previously considered lost.
