= List of works about Thomas Merton =

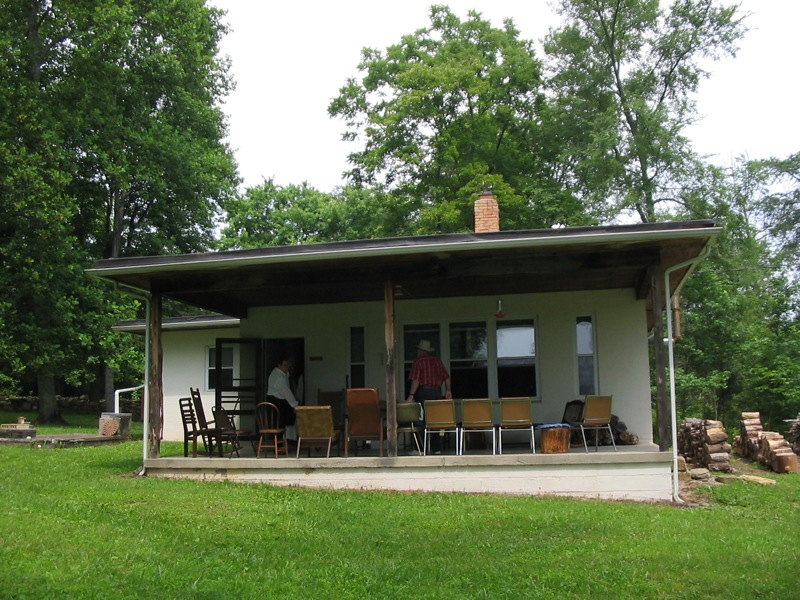
Thomas Merton's hermitage at The Abbey of Our Lady of Gethsemani

The following is a list of works about Thomas Merton, publications about Thomas Merton, the Trappist monk from Abbey of Gethsemani. The bibliography is organized into categories. A separate list of works by Thomas Merton is also available.

== Art criticism ==
- Griffin, John H. (1970). Hidden Wholeness: The Visual World of Thomas Merton. Houghton Mifflin. OCLC 98751.
- Hamric, Roy. Seeing Through the Window: The Photography of Thomas Merton. OCLC 76805335.
- Labrie, Ross (1979). The Art of Thomas Merton. Texas Christian University Press. ISBN 0-912646-48-9. OCLC 4665316.
- Lipsey, Roger (2006). Angelic Mistakes: The Art of Thomas Merton. New Seeds. ISBN 1-59030-313-X. OCLC 62093054.
- Merton, Thomas (1982). Thomas Merton's New Mexico photographs. ISBN 0-89013-140-6. OCLC 57417029.
- Owensboro Museum of Fine Art (Ky.) (1989). An Easter Anthology : Owensboro Museum of Fine Art, Owensboro, Kentucky, February 26 to April 9, 1989. Owensboro Museum of Fine Art (Ky.). OCLC 21956905.
- Patnaik, Deba Prasad; Merton, Thomas (1980). Geography of Holiness: The Photography of Thomas Merton. Pilgrim Press. ISBN 0-8298-0401-3. OCLC 6487426.
- Pearson, Paul M. A Wide Open Lens: The Photography of Thomas Merton. OCLC 182519056.
- Pearson, Paul M. (2003). The Paradox of Place: Thomas Merton's Photography. Thomas Merton Center. ISBN 0-9638927-7-0. OCLC 53103770.
- Richter, Philip J. (2006). Late developer: Thomas Merton's discovery of photography as a medium for his contemplative vision. OCLC 76262354.
- Stuart, Angus (2006). Seeing and Not Seeing what Merton Saw. OCLC 76811310.
- Yew, Hongchang (1999). Thomas Merton's Journey with Art: A Study of Thomas Merton's Spiritual Aesthetics (Thesis). Drew University. OCLC 43759260.

== Articles ==
- Barbour, John (2005). "The Ethics of Intercultural Travel: Thomas Merton's Asian Pilgrimage and Orientalism". Biography (University of Hawai'i Press). 28 (1). Project Muse. ISSN 0162-4962. OCLC 90680834.
- St. John, Donald (2002). "Technological Culture And Contemplative Ecology In Thomas Merton's Conjectures Of A Guilty Bystander". World Views: Environment, Culture, Religion. 6 (2). Brill Academic Publishers. ISSN 1363-5247. OCLC 90477719.
- Thompson, Phillip M. (2004). "Thomas Merton And Leo Szilard: The Parallel Paths Of A Monk And A Nuclear Physicist". Zygon: Journal of Religion & Science. 39 (4). Blackwell Publishing: 979–986. doi:10.1111/j.1467-9744.2004.00632.x. ISSN 0591-2385. OCLC 89017755.

== Biographies ==
- Baker, James Thomas (1971). Thomas Merton: Social Critic, A Study. University Press of Kentucky. ISBN 0-8131-1238-9. OCLC 181084.
- Bryant, Jennifer Fisher (1997). Thomas Merton: Poet, Prophet, Priest. Eerdmans Books for Young Readers. ISBN 0-8028-5140-1. OCLC 34651313.
- Collins, David R. (1981). Thomas Merton: Monk with a Mission. St. Anthony Messenger Press. ISBN 0-912228-99-7. OCLC 10517182.
- Crompton, Samuel Willard (2004). Thomas Merton (Spiritual Leaders and Thinkers). Facts on File, Inc. ISBN 0-7910-7862-0. OCLC 54079784.
- Cunningham, Lawrence (1999). Thomas Merton and the Monastic Vision. Wm. B. Eerdmans Publishing. ISBN 0-8028-0222-2. OCLC 41482315.
- Forest, James H. (1991). Living with Wisdom: A Life of Thomas Merton. Orbis Books. ISBN 0-88344-755-X. OCLC 23971380.
- Furlong, Monica (1980). Merton: A Biography. Harper & Row. ISBN 0-06-063079-5. OCLC 6278157.
- Griffin, John H.; Bonazzi, Robert (1993). Follow the Ecstasy:The Hermitage Years of Thomas Merton. Orbis Books. ISBN 0-88344-847-5. OCLC 26975461.
- Hart, Patrick (1983). Thomas Merton, Monk: A Monastic Tribute. Cistercian Publications. ISBN 0-87907-752-2. OCLC 10405051.
- Higgins, Michael W. (1998). Heretic Blood: The Spiritual Geography of Thomas Merton. Stoddart Publishing. ISBN 0-7737-6153-5. OCLC 49780133.
- Inchausti, Robert (1998). Thomas Merton's American Prophecy. State University of New York Press. ISBN 0-7914-3636-5. OCLC 36923048.
- Kountz, Peter (1991). Thomas Merton as Writer and Monk: A Cultural Study, 1915-1951. Carlson Publishing. ISBN 0-926019-48-1. OCLC 24174429.
- Lawlor, Patrick T.; Merton, Thomas (1990). Thomas Merton: The Poet and the Contemplative Life. Columbia University Libraries. ISBN 0-9607862-2-8. OCLC 22544443.
- Malits, Elena (1980). The Solitary Explorer: Thomas Merton's Transforming Journey. Harper & Row. ISBN 0-06-065411-2. OCLC 6304300.
- McInery, Dennis Q. (1974). Thomas Merton: The Man and His Work. Cistercian Publications. ISBN 0-87907-827-8. OCLC 858734.
- Mott, Michael (1984). The Seven Mountains of Thomas Merton. Houghton Mifflin. ISBN 0-395-31324-4. OCLC 60169902.
- Padovano, Anthony T. (1982). The Human Journey: Thomas Merton, Symbol of a Century. Doubleday. ISBN 0-385-17879-4. OCLC 7653365.
- Pennington, M. Basil (1987). Thomas Merton, Brother Monk: The Quest for True Freedom. Harper & Row. ISBN 0-06-066497-5. OCLC 15486537.
- Rice, Edward E. (1970). The Man in the Sycamore Tree. Doubleday. ISBN 0-15-656960-4. OCLC 11316510.
- Seitz, Ron (1993). Song For Nobody: A Memory Vision Of Thomas Merton. Triumph Books. ISBN 0-89243-486-4. OCLC 27186465.
- Seitz, Ron (1995). Thomas Merton. White Fields Press. ISBN 0-89243-486-4. OCLC 33953933.
- Shannon, William Henry (1992). Silent Lamp: The Thomas Merton Story. The Crossroad Publishing Company. ISBN 0-8245-1281-2. OCLC 29781979.
- Shannon, William H.; Bochen, Christine M.; O'Connell, Patrick F. (2002). The Thomas Merton Encyclopedia. Orbis Books. ISBN 1-57075-426-8. OCLC 48871712.
- Shannon, William H. (2005). Thomas Merton: An Introduction. St. Anthony Messenger Press. ISBN 0-86716-710-6. OCLC 61115434.
- Shaw, Jeffrey M. (2014). Illusions of Freedom: Thomas Merton and Jacques Ellul on Technology and the Human Condition. Wipf & Stock. ISBN 978-1625640581.
- Sussman, Cornelia; Sussman, Irving (1976). Thomas Merton: The Daring Young Man on the Flying Belltower. Macmillan. ISBN 0-02-788630-1. OCLC 1859733.
- Theodore, Antony (1993). Thomas Merton's Mystical Quest for Union with God. Ventura Verlaghaus. ISBN 978-38-809676-3-2. OCLC 30320691.
- Wilkes, Paul (1984). Merton: By Those Who Knew Him Best. Harper & Row. ISBN 0-06-069416-5. OCLC 11029419.
- Woodcock, George (1978). Thomas Merton, Monk and Poet: A Critical Study. Farrar, Straus, Giroux. ISBN 0-374-27635-8. OCLC 4407338.

== Correspondence ==
- Bochen, Christine M. (1993). The Courage for Truth: The Letters of Thomas Merton to Writers (The Thomas Merton Letters Series, 4). Farrar, Straus, Giroux. ISBN 0-374-13055-8. OCLC 77116996.
- Biddle, Arthur W. (2001). When Prophecy Still Had a Voice: The Letters of Thomas Merton and Robert Lax. University Press of Kentucky. ISBN 0-8131-2168-X. OCLC 43287636.
- Cooper, David D. (1997). Thomas Merton and James Laughlin: Selected Letters. W. W. Norton & Company. ISBN 0-393-04069-0. OCLC 185747161.
- Daggy, Robert E. (1993). The Road to Joy: The Letters of Thomas Merton to New and Old Friends. Harvest Books. ISBN 0-15-677818-1. OCLC 26858205.
- Daggy, Robert E. (1988). Encounter: Thomas Merton & D.T. Suzuki. Larkspur Press. OCLC 19401691.
- Greene, Jonathan (2004). On the Banks of Monks Pond: The Thomas Merton/Jonathan Greene Correspondence. Broadstone Books. ISBN 0-9721144-2-4. OCLC 61169350.
- Faggen, Robert (1997). Striving Towards Being: The Letters of Thomas Merton and Czeslaw Milosz. Farrar, Straus and Giroux. ISBN 0-374-27100-3. OCLC 34943219.
- Hart, Patrick (1993). The School Of Charity: The Letters Of Thomas Merton On Religious Renewal And Spiritual Direction. Harvest Books. ISBN 0-15-679515-9. OCLC 26858206.
- Hart, Patrick (2002). Survival or Prophecy?: The Letters of Thomas Merton and Jean LeClercq. Farrar, Straus and Giroux. ISBN 0-374-27206-9. OCLC 48943144.
- Lax, Robert; Merton, Thomas (1994). A Catch of Anti-Letters. Sheed & Ward. ISBN 1-55612-712-X. OCLC 29754342.
- Kinsella, Nivard (1991). A Smooth and Fancy Typewriter: Letters of Thomas Merton. OCLC 48887975.
- Merton, Thomas (1983). Letters from Tom: A Selection of Letters from Father Thomas Merton, Monk of Gethsemani, to W.H. Ferry, 1961-1968. Fort Hill Press. OCLC 10478421.
- Shannon, William H. (1993). The Hidden Ground of Love: The Letters of Thomas Merton on Religious Experience and Social Concerns. Harcourt. ISBN 0-15-640141-X. OCLC 26858207.
- Shannon, William H. (1994). Witness to Freedom: The Letters of Thomas Merton in Times of Crisis (The Thomas Merton Letters Series, 5). Farrar, Straus, Giroux. ISBN 0-374-29191-8. OCLC 30594669.
- Tardiff, Mary (1995). At Home in the World: The Letters of Thomas Merton and Rosemary Radford Ruether. Orbis Books. ISBN 1-57075-015-7. OCLC 32166902.

== Devotions and meditations ==
- Bailey, Raymond (1987). Thomas Merton on Mysticism. Doubleday. ISBN 0-385-07173-6. OCLC 1253997.
- De Waal, Esther; Henri J.M. Nouwen (1992). A Seven Day Journey With Thomas Merton. Servant Publications. ISBN 0-89283-789-6. OCLC 27725306.
- Haase, Albert (1993). Swimming in the Sun: Discovering the Lord's Prayer with Francis of Assisi and Thomas Merton. St. Anthony Messenger Press. ISBN 0-86716-193-0. OCLC 28947557.
- McDonnell, Thomas P.; Merton, Thomas (1983). Blaze of Recognition: Through the Year with Thomas Merton: Daily Meditations. Doubleday. ISBN 0-385-08683-0. OCLC 9488700.
- Merton, Thomas (1998). Mornings with Thomas Merton: Readings and Reflections. Saint Anthony Messenger Press & Franciscan Communications. ISBN 1-56955-009-3. OCLC 37890554.
- Padovano, Anthony T. (1984). Contemplation and Compassion: Thomas Merton's Vision. Peter Pauper Press. ISBN 0-88088-104-6. OCLC 11098583.
- Padovano, Anthony T. (1996). A Retreat with Thomas Merton: Becoming Who We Are. St. Anthony Messenger Press. ISBN 0-86716-229-5. OCLC 34596183.

== Journals and newsletters ==
- "The Merton Annual: Studies in Thomas Merton Religion Culture Literature and Social Concerns". The Merton Annual. New York: AMS Press. ISSN 0894-4857. OCLC 16115406.
- Contemplation & Action: Newsletter of the Thomas Merton Center Foundation. Louisville, KY: Thomas Merton Center Foundation. OCLC 51324840.
- "The Merton Seasonal of Bellarmine College". The Merton Seasonal. Louisville, Ky: Thomas Merton Studies Center, Bellarmine College. ISSN 0899-4927. OCLC 11015570.
- "The Merton Journal". The Merton Journal. Southampton, United Kingdom: Centre for Contemporary Theology, Dept. of Theology, LSU for The Thomas Merton Society of Great Britain and Ireland. OCLC 33100443.

== Literary criticism ==
- Bowden, Lisa (1987). Passion and Paradox: Sacramental Metaphor in Thomas Merton. Honors thesis (Millsaps College). OCLC 17336297.
- Campbell, Susan Margaret (1954). The Poetry of Thomas Merton: A Study in Theory, Influences, and Form. Stanford University. OCLC 67162373.
- Cooper, David D. (1989). Thomas Merton's Art of Denial: The Evolution of a Radical Humanist. University of Georgia Press. ISBN 0-8203-1094-8. OCLC 18051209.
- Grayston, Donald; Higgins, Michael W. (1983). Thomas Merton: Pilgrim in Process. Griffin House. ISBN 0-88760-109-X. OCLC 11371377.
- Grayston, Donald (1985). Thomas Merton, the Development of a Spiritual Theologian. E. Mellen Press. ISBN 0-88946-758-7. OCLC 11519661.
- Higgins, John J. (1971). Merton's Theology of Prayer. Cistercian Publications. OCLC 561888.
- Labrie, Ross (2001). Thomas Merton and the Inclusive Imagination. University of Missouri Press. ISBN 0-8262-6279-1. OCLC 56479767.
- Lentfoehr, Sister Thérèse (1979). Words and Silence: On the Poetry of Thomas Merton. New Directions Publishing. ISBN 0-8112-0712-9. OCLC 4494682.
- Kramer, Victor (1987). Thomas Merton, Monk and Artist (Cistercian Studies Series). Cistercian Publications. ISBN 0-87907-602-X. OCLC 15366064.
- Nouwen, Henri J.M. (1972). Pray to Live: Thomas Merton: a Contemplative Critic. Fides Publishing. ISBN 0-8190-0580-0. OCLC 488271.
- O'Hara, Dennis Patrick (1999). Merton, Berry, & Eco-theology (Teilhard studies). American Teilhard Association for the Future of Man. ISBN 0-89012-080-3. OCLC 42465303.
- Smock, Frederick (2007). Pax Intrantibus: A Meditation on the Poetry of Thomas Merton. Broadstone Books. ISBN 978-0-9721144-6-2. OCLC 132691960.
- Waldron, Robert G. (2002). Walking with Thomas Merton: Discovering His Poetry, Essays, and Journals. Paulist Press. ISBN 0-8091-4058-6. OCLC 47869085.
- Voigt, Robert J. (1972). Thomas Merton: A Different Drummer. Liguori Publications. OCLC 481464.

== Miscellaneous ==
- Baker, James Thomas (1976). Under the Sign of the Waterbearer: A Life of Thomas Merton (A Play). Love Street Books. ISBN 0-915216-15-9. OCLC 3892014.
- Bamberger, John Eudes (2005). Thomas Merton: Prophet of Renewal. Cistercian Publications. ISBN 0-87907-010-2. OCLC 59712350.
- Capps, Walter H.; Merton, Thomas. Thomas Merton: Preview of the Asian Journey. The Crossroad Publishing Company. ISBN 0-8245-0951-X. OCLC 19589894.
- Dart, Ron (2005). Thomas Merton and the Beats of the North Cascades. Prospect Press. ISBN 1-894440-04-8. OCLC 69184396.
- Del Prete, Thomas (1990). Thomas Merton and the Education of the Whole Person. Religious Education Press. ISBN 0-89135-074-8. OCLC 20453932.
- De Waal, Esther (2002). Merton's gaze: the vision of a multi-faceted man. OCLC 51513411.
- Griffin, John H. (1981). The Hermitage Journals: A Diary Kept While Working on the Biography of Thomas Merton. Andrews and McMeel. ISBN 0-8362-3909-1. OCLC 7773188.
- Gunn, Robert Jingen (2000). Journeys Into Emptiness: Dogen, Merton, Jung and the Quest for Transformation. Paulist Press. ISBN 0-8091-3933-2. OCLC 43657026.
- Herron, Fred (2005). No Abiding Place: Thomas Merton And The Search For God. University Press of America. ISBN 0-7618-3135-5. OCLC 58044739.
- Inchausti, Robert; Merton, Thomas (2007). Echoing Silence: Thomas Merton on the Vocation of Writing. New Seeds. ISBN 978-1-59030-348-1. OCLC 71369064.
- King, Robert Harlan (2001). Thomas Merton and Thich Nhat Hanh: Engaged Spirituality in an Age of Globalization. Continuum International Publishing. ISBN 0-8264-1340-4. OCLC 47081263.
- Harnden, Philip (2003). Journeys of Simplicity: Traveling Light with Thomas Merton, Basho, Edward Abbey, Annie Dillard, & Others. SkyLight Paths Publishing. ISBN 1-893361-76-4. OCLC 50767827.
- Lane, Belden C. (1999). Merton as Zen Clown. OCLC 48699386.
- Lee, Cyrus (1994). Thomas Merton and Chinese Wisdom. Sino-American Institute. OCLC 33490648.
- Lipski, Andrew (1983). Thomas Merton and Asia: His Quest for Utopia. Cistercian Publications. ISBN 0-87907-874-X. OCLC 9557440.
- King, Peter (1995). Dark Night Spirituality. SPCK Publishing. ISBN 0-281-04884-3. OCLC 33950060.
- McDonnell, Thomas P. (1974). A Thomas Merton Reader. Image Books. ISBN 0-385-03292-7. OCLC 897842.
- Meatyard, Ralph Eugene (1991). Father Louie: Photographs of Thomas Merton. Timken Publishers. ISBN 0-943221-10-2. OCLC 22662907.
- Montaldo, Jonathan (1996). Entering the Silence: Becoming a Monk & Writer. HarperSanFrancisco. ISBN 0-06-065476-7. OCLC 32699480.
- O'Connell, Patrick F. (2003). The Vision of Thomas Merton. Ave Maria Press. ISBN 0-87793-991-8. OCLC 51984941.
- Palmer, Parker J. (1979). In the Belly of a Paradox: A Celebration of Contradictions in the Thought of Thomas Merton. Pendle Hill Publications. ISBN 0-87574-224-6. OCLC 4916532.
- Pearson, Paul M. (2003). Thomas Merton Archivist: Preserving His Own Memory. OCLC 52640195.
- Pearson, Paul M. (1996). The Whale And The Ivy: Journey And Stability In The Life And Writing Of Thomas Merton. OCLC 54961443.
- Pearson, Paul (2001). From Clairvaux and Pleasant Hill to Mount Olivet: Thomas Merton's Geography of Place. OCLC 54961400.
- Pearson, Paul M. (2007). A Meeting of Angels: Thomas Merton and the Shakers. OCLC 190861089.
- Pennington, M. Basil; Mulhearn, Timothy (1984). Getting It All Together: The Heritage of Thomas Merton. Michael Glazier. ISBN 0-89453-380-0. OCLC 11507590.
- Pennington, M. Basil (1988). Toward an Integrated Humanity: Thomas Merton's Journey. Cistercian Publications. ISBN 0-87907-603-8. OCLC 16093567.
- Shaffer, Timothy J. (2008). "A (Not So) Secret Son of Francis:Thomas Merton’s Franciscan Lens for Seeing Heaven and Earth." The Merton Annual 21: 67–90. ISBN 978-1891785351 OCLC 926181210
- Shaffer, Timothy Joseph. (2006). A secret son of Francis: the Franciscan influence in the thought and writings of Thomas Merton. OCLC 75959955
- Shaffer, Timothy Joseph (2007). Thomas Merton's Franciscan Spirituality. The Cord. OCLC 144609048.
- Thurston, Bonnie Bowman (2007). Merton & Buddhism: Wisdom, Emptiness and Everyday Mind. Fons Vita. ISBN 978-1-887752-84-8. OCLC 123165638.
- Turley, Hugh; Martin, David (2018). The Martyrdom of Thomas Merton: An Investigation. McCabe Publishing. ISBN 978-1548077389. OCLC 1028239516.
- Twomey, Gerald Sean (1978). Thomas Merton, Prophet in the Belly of a Paradox. Paulist Press. ISBN 0-8091-0268-4. OCLC 4834690.
- "Thomas Merton Series". Fons Vitae. Archived from the original on 2008-12-25.

== Poetry ==
- Seitz, Ron (1985). The Gethsemani Poems: From Within The Walls Of The Abbey Of Gethsemani, The Monastery At Trappist, Kentucky, Home Of Thomas Merton, Monk & Poet. Larkspur Press. OCLC 13198250.
- Seitz, Ron (1985). Signature: In Memory of Thomas Merton. Necessity Press. OCLC 70993302.
- Seitz, Ron (1988). Monks Pond, Old Hermit, Hai!: A Haiku Homage To Thomas Merton. Larkspur Press. OCLC 20079731.

== Reference books ==
- Breit, Marquita; Daggy, Robert E. (1986). Thomas Merton: A Comprehensive Bibliography. Garland Publishing. ISBN 0-8240-8920-0. OCLC 13008234.
- Burton, Patricia (2008). More Than Silence: A Bibliography of Thomas Merton. Scarecrow Press. ISBN 978-0-8108-6095-7. OCLC 191732307.
- Dell Isola, Frank (1975). Thomas Merton:A Bibliography. Kent State University Press. ISBN 0-87338-156-4. OCLC 1167581.

== Selected writings ==
- Bochen, Christine; Merton, Thomas (2000). Thomas Merton: Essential Writings (Spiritual Masters Series). Orbis Books. ISBN 1-57075-331-8. OCLC 45263907.
- Carr, Anne E. (1988). A search for wisdom and spirit: Thomas Merton's theology of the self. University of Notre Dame Press. ISBN 0-268-01727-1. OCLC 16682869.
- Cunningham, Lawrence; Merton; Thomas (1992). Thomas Merton, Spiritual Master: The Essential Writings. Paulist Press. ISBN 0-8091-3314-8. OCLC 25509178.
- Deignan, Kathleen; Merton, Thomas (2007). A Book of Hours. Sorin Books. ISBN 978-1-933495-05-7.
- Deignan, Kathleen; Merton, Thomas; Berry, Thomas; Giuliani, John (2003). When the Trees Say Nothing: Writings on Nature. Sorin Books. ISBN 1-893732-60-6. OCLC 50684614.
- Leclercq, Jean; Merton, Thomas (1980). Thomas Merton on St. Bernard (Cistercian Fathers Series). Cistercian Publications. ISBN 0-87907-809-X. OCLC 5941522.
- Merton Institute for Contemplative Living, The; Montaldo, Jonathan; Merton, Thomas (2007). Thomas Merton: In My Own Words. Liguori Publications. ISBN 978-0-7648-1671-0. OCLC 165957235.
- Perigo, Grace; Adam of Perseigne; Thomas Merton (1976). Letters of Adam of Perseigne (Cistercian Fathers Series, No 21). Cistercian Publications. ISBN 0-87907-621-6. OCLC 3017543.
- Porter, J.S.; Merton, Thomas (1988). The Thomas Merton Poems: A Caravan of Poems. Moonstone Press. ISBN 0-920259-19-7. OCLC 18378641.
- Powaski, Ronald E.; Merton, Thomas (1988). Thomas Merton on Nuclear Weapons. Loyola University Press. ISBN 0-8294-0586-0. OCLC 16981789.
- Shannon, William H. (1997). Something of a Rebel: Thomas Merton, His Life and Works, An Introduction. St. Anthony Messenger Press. ISBN 0-86716-272-4. OCLC 37738204.
- Shannon, William H. (1981). Thomas Merton's Dark Path: The Inner Experience of a Contemplative. Farrar, Straus, Giroux. ISBN 0-374-27636-6. OCLC 7172254.

== Audio ==
- Betz, Margaret; et al. (1995). Merton and Art. Sounds True. OCLC 54436007.
- Bochen, Christine M.; Jonathan Montaldo; Raymond Wilkie (1993). Merton and Stability. Sounds True Recordings. OCLC 31218292.
- Bochen, Christine M.; et al. (1995). Editing the Merton Letters. Sounds True Recordings. OCLC 54434778.
- Bochen, Christine M.; Suzanne Zeurcher (1999). Merton and the Feminine: Re-reading Merton's Relationship with "M". International Thomas Merton Society. OCLC 44040099.
- Bochen, Christine M. (1998). Love and Solitude: The Journals of Thomas Merton. Chautauqua Institution. ISBN 1-4193-5481-7. OCLC 40325703.
- Bourgeault, Cynthia (2006). On Thomas Merton. The Contemplative Society. OCLC 86074696.
- Carroll, James (2002). Thomas Merton and Judaism. Thomas Merton Foundation. OCLC 49713047.
- Deignan, Kathleen (2009). A Book of Hours: At Prayer with Thomas Merton. Schola Ministries. ASIN B002J04NYI.
- Finley, James (2002). Thomas Merton's Path to the Palace of Nowhere: The Essential Guide to the Contemplative Teachings of Thomas Merton. Sounds True. ISBN 1-56455-938-6. OCLC 49631328.
- Hogan, Christine Jensen (1994). The Contemplative, the Artist, and the Child. Veranda Communications. OCLC 54482405.
- O'Connell, Patrick F. (2001). The Spirituality of Thomas Merton. Éist. OCLC 73696520.
- O'Connell, Patrick F.; Lynne Szabo (1999). Merton the Poet. International Thomas Merton Society. OCLC 54396906.
- O'Connell, Patrick F.; Arthur W Biddle; Edward R Heidt (1991). Merton & His Writings. National Catholic Reporter Pub. Co.; Credence Cassettes [distributor]. OCLC 24842161.
- O'Connell, Patrick F. The Paschal Heart of Merton's Spirituality. OCLC 57313687.
- Padovano, Anthony T. (1979). Thomas Merton's Spirituality. Arena Lettres. OCLC 20087191.
- Padovano, Anthony T. (1982). Thomas Merton, A Life For Our Times. National Catholic Reporter Pub. Co. OCLC 8445686.
- Seitz, Ron (1993). The Poetry of Merton: A Reading. Sounds True Recordings. OCLC 31218228.
- Seitz, Ron (1996). Thomas Merton the Man. New Dimensions Foundation. OCLC 57313683.
- Seitz, Ron; et al. (2006). Remembering Thomas Merton: The Man, the Mystic, the Social Activist. New Dimensions Media. ISBN 0-7813-0751-1. OCLC 82930412.
- Shannon, William H. (1993). Thomas Merton and American Catholic Culture. St. Bernard's Institute. OCLC 28515279.
- Shannon, William H. (1993). Solitude, way to reality reflections on Merton's "Philosophy of solitude". Colorado Springs, CO: Sounds True Recordings. OCLC 31198086.
- Shannon, William H.; Gruber, Albion (1978). Thomas Merton collection dedication December 10, 1978. Rochester, NY: Nazareth College. OCLC 9687925.
- Shannon, William H. (1998). Seven Story Mountain fifty years later. Chautauqua, NY: Chautauqua Institution. OCLC 40325521.
- Toms, Michael; Kelly, Timothy; O'Callaghan, Tommie; Kelty, Matthew; Quenon, Paul; Seitz, Ron (2001). Thomas Merton remembered with Thomas Merton special. New Dimensions Foundation. OCLC 57313682.
- University of Kentucky. Dept. of English; University of Kentucky. Dept. of University Extension (1985). Thomas Merton. University of Kentucky. OCLC 12886188.

== Video ==
- A Taste of Gethsemani: Trappist Monks Remember Merton. Bellarmine College. 1996. OCLC 37149964.
- Merton's Last Day. Ikonographics. OCLC 18299208.
- The Merton Project: The Biography of Thomas Merton. The Reeves Teletape. 1984. OCLC 12597835.
- Thomas Merton: Seeder of Radical Action. Credence Communications. 2001. OCLC 50015478.
- Aprile, Dianne; Ford, John H.; Greene, Jonathan; Richardson, Jane Marie; Seitz, Ron; Sisto, Richard (2001). Kentucky Friends Remember Thomas Merton. Thomas Merton Center Foundation. OCLC 48846840.
- Atkinson, Morgan C. (2002). Time in the Garden Life at the Abbey of Gethsemani. Duckworks, Inc. OCLC 50300868.
- Atkinson, Morgan C. (2003). Gethsemani. Duckworks, Inc. OCLC 51008987.
- Bochen, Christine; Mary Luke Tobin; Tommie O'Callaghan; Myriam Dardenne; Madelyn Meatyard; Margaret Brennan (1998). Women Who Knew Merton. Thomas Merton Center Foundation. OCLC 42775041.
- Colgate Rochester Divinity School (1993). Thomas Merton: Shaping the American Peace Movement. OCLC 28454308.
- Colgate Rochester Divinity School (1993). Thomas Merton's Impact on Re-shaping American Catholic Spirituality. OCLC 28454269.
- Collins, Patrick; Cottrell, Harold (1994). Thomas Merton: Man, Monk, & Myth, A Spiritual Concert. Compari. OCLC 48167453.
- Di Benedetto, Romeo (1997). Legacy of Thomas Merton. El Paso Community College. OCLC 37564433.
- Fisher, Douglas; Toone, Carmela; Dewey, Dennis (1997). An Introduction to Thomas Merton. Fisher Productions. OCLC 38986794.
- Glynn, Audrey Laurine (1984). Merton: A Film Biography of Thomas Merton. First Run Features. OCLC 20127408.
- Kaplan, Edward K.; Magid, Shaul; Schachter, Zalman M. (2002). Thomas Merton and Renewal, Christian and Jewish: an interview with Rabbi Zalman Schachter-Shalomi. Thomas Merton Center Foundation. OCLC 49296033.
- Kelty, Matthew (2003). A Portrait of Thomas Merton. Gethsemani Abbey. OCLC 124508561.
- Moriarty, Michael (2007). Winter Rain: Six Images of Thomas Merton. Paulist Press. OCLC 11861247.
- Nazareth College of Rochester (1983). Thomas Merton Symposium. OCLC 15926433.
- Nazareth College of Rochester (1988). Thomas Merton: A Voice for Today. OCLC 19248320.
- The Seven Storey Mountain: A Conversion Story. Nazareth College of Rochester. 1988. OCLC 19248362.
- Nazareth College of Rochester (2000). Poetry of Thomas Merton. Nazareth College of Rochester. OCLC 73693676.
- Nazareth College of Rochester (2000). Thomas Merton's Vision of the Kingdom. OCLC 53067346.
- Thurston, Bonnie; Talbott, Harold (2000). The (almost) final days of Thomas Merton: A Conversation with Harold Talbott. Thomas Merton Center Foundation. OCLC 47287256.
- Von Hildebrand, Alice. The Tragedy of Thomas Merton. Keep the Faith. OCLC 18590605.
