= Ends and Means =

1937 book of essays by Aldous Huxley

- First edition
- Author: Aldous Huxley
- Publisher: Chatto & Windus
- Publication date: 1937

Ends and Means (an Enquiry Into the Nature of Ideals and Into the Methods Employed for Their Realization) is a book of essays written by Aldous Huxley. Published in 1937, the book contains tracts on war, religion, nationalism and ethics, and was cited as a major influence on Thomas Merton in his autobiography, The Seven Storey Mountain.

The first American edition was published concurrently in 1937 under publisher Harper & Brothers Publishers, New York and London.
