= Big Love (play) =

Play written by Charles L. Mee

Big Love is a play by American playwright Charles L. Mee. Based on Aeschylus's The Suppliants, it is about fifty brides who flee to a manor in Italy to avoid marrying their fifty cousins. The play takes the plot of the original Greek play into modern times, including such details as having the grooms ambush the brides by helicopter. While the brides and grooms wait for their wedding day, the characters raise issues of gender politics, love, and domestic violence. The first production of the play was directed by Les Waters at the Actor's Theatre of Louisville in 2000.

In a 2003 interview with Open Stages newsletter, Mee said, "[I wanted to go back to what some people thought was one of the earliest plays of the Western World, which is The Suppliant Women, and see how that would look today. See if it still spoke to the moment, and of course it does. It’s all about refugees and gender wars and men and women trying to find what will get them through the rubble of dysfunctional relationships, and anger and rage and heartache. ...You know, unlike so much drama on television, where there’s a small misunderstanding at the top of the hour that you know is going to be resolved before the final commercial break. The Greeks start with matricide, fratricide..." A detailed interview about Mee's adaptations of Greek tragedy in general, and Big Love in particular, can be found in "Charles Mee's '(Re)Making of Greek Tragedy" by Erin B. Mee.

== Characters ==
- Thyona: Bride, stereotype of the angry feminist. Hatches the plot to kill the grooms on their wedding night. Betrothed to Constantine.
- Olympia: Bride, polar opposite of Thyona. Stereotype of the love-lorn woman who only wants a man to take care of her. Betrothed to Oed.
- Lydia: Bride, middle ground between her two sisters. Betrothed to Nikos and the only bride who does not kill her husband.
- Constantine: Groom, the ultimate misogynist.
- Oed: Groom, not very bright.
- Nikos: Groom, longs for a real connection with his bride.
- Piero: Owner of the Italian manor providing sanctuary to the brides.
- Bella: Old woman, mother of Piero. Has thirteen sons.
- Giuliano: Grandson of Bella. Gay, sometimes depicted as transgender or wearing a half-tuxedo/half-gown costume.
- Leo and Eleanor: Wedding guests who provide hope and comic relief
