= James Finley (author) =

American author, clinical psychologist and former Trappist monk

- Born: May 30, 1943 (age 83); Akron, Ohio
- Occupations: author, clinical psychologist
- Writing career
- Period: 1978–present
- Genre: Spirituality
- Subject: Christian mysticism
- Notable work: Merton's Palace of Nowhere
- Website: James Finley at the Center for Action and Contemplation

James Finley (born May 30, 1943) is an American author, clinical psychologist and former Trappist monk at the Abbey of Gethsemani, under the spiritual direction of Thomas Merton.

Finley is the author of several popular books on spirituality and Christian mysticism including Merton's Palace of Nowhere, The Contemplative Heart, and Christian Meditation: Experiencing the Presence of God. Along with founder Richard Rohr, he is a core faculty member at the Center for Action and Contemplation (CAC) in Albuquerque, New Mexico. In addition to hosting online and in-person retreats, Finley is the host of the podcast, Turning to the Mystics, which explores the teachings of medieval Catholic mystics such as Meister Eckhart, Julian of Norwich, Teresa of Avila, and John of the Cross.

== Life ==
Finley was born in Akron, Ohio on May 30, 1943. He experienced childhood trauma since his father was an alcoholic, often violent towards him and his mother. In the midst of this chaos, Finley was impressed by his mother's Roman Catholic faith and immersed himself in it. At age 14, he discovered a book by Thomas Merton called The Sign of Jonas, and felt called to the monastic life. Finley entered the Trappist order at the Abbey of Gethsemane "the day after graduation" from high school in 1961. His monastic name was Br. Mary Einbar, and Merton became his novice director in 1962. In addition to Christian mysticism, Finley learned from Merton about the Buddhist, Hindu, and Islamic mystical traditions. He remained at the monastery until January 1967, when he left abruptly after being sexually abused by one of the monks.

After leaving the monastery, Finley pursued bachelor's and master's degrees in English education and taught at a number of Catholic schools in the Cleveland, Ohio area. During this time, he wrote Merton's Palace of Nowhere and was first invited to lead retreats on Thomas Merton and contemplative spirituality. At one of these retreats, he was persuaded to pursue a Ph.D. in psychology at Fuller Theological Seminary. He integrated his psychological knowledge into his spiritual teaching and writing, and worked as a therapist in private practice with his wife for thirty years. He worked as a therapist Monday-Wednesday, wrote Thursday-Friday, and gave a retreat somewhere in the United States or Canada about once a month.

Today, Finley is a core faculty member at the Living School at the Center for Action and Contemplation in New Mexico along with Richard Rohr, Brian McLaren, Cynthia Bourgeault and Dr. Barbara Holmes. He continues to write, lead retreats, teach online courses and hosts a podcast called Turning to the Mystics. His memoir, The Healing Path was published in 2022.

== Published works ==
=== Books ===
- Merton's Palace of Nowhere, foreword by Henri Nouwen (1978, new edition 2018, Ave Maria Press), ISBN 9781594713170
- The Awakening Call: Fostering Intimacy With God (1984, Ave Maria Press), ISBN 9780877932789
- The Contemplative Heart (2000, Sorin Books), ISBN 9781893732100
- Christian Meditation: Experiencing the Presence of God (2003, HarperCollins; new editions 2005, 2009), ISBN 9780060750640
- The Healing Path: A Memoir and Invitation (2022, Orbis Books), ISBN 9781608339723

=== Audio programs ===
- Meditation for Christians: Entering the Mind of Christ (2003, SoundsTrue), ISBN 9781591791218
- Thomas Merton’s Path to the Palace of Nowhere (2004, SoundsTrue)
- Jesus and Buddha: Paths to Awakening, with Richard Rohr (2008, Center for Action and Contemplation)
- Transforming Trauma: A Seven Step Process for Spiritual Healing, with Caroline Myss (2009, SoundsTrue)
- Meister Eckhart's Living Wisdom: Indestructible Joy and the Path of Letting Go (2014, SoundsTrue)
