= Original Child Bomb =

- Directed by: Carey McKenzie (as Carey Schonegevel)
- Written by: Carey McKenzie
- Release date: 2004
- Running time: 57 minutes
- Language: English

Original Child Bomb is a 2004 documentary about the aftermath of the atomic bombings of Hiroshima and Nagasaki. The film premiered at the 2004 Tribeca Film Festival and was aired on many stations on August 6, 2005, the 60th anniversary of the bombings. The title of the film was inspired by Thomas Merton's poem of the same name, which is quoted throughout the film.

The documentary employs color footage that had previously been labeled top secret by the US government. The 2005 airing of Original Child Bomb was the most extensive exposure to date of this footage in the United States. It had been filmed by both the United States military and Japanese camera crews.

Original Child Bomb was directed by Carey McKenzie and produced by Holly Becker.

== Synopsis ==
Original Child Bomb begins with a recreation of the dropping of Little Boy from the perspective of Hiroshima's residents. It is joined with both historical and contemporary footage and overlaid with various voice-overs. The documentary moves on to offer the accounts of several Japanese witnesses of the atomic bombing destruction.

I saw so many corpses drifting in the water ... countless bodies came floating ... I couldn't bear to look. People without heads ... people without arms ... people with their guts hanging out ... without eyes ...

— Tale of Japanese survivor as subtitled in Original Child Bomb

The final part of the documentary consists of interviews with American students in a modern classroom setting. Much of the film is presented in a montage style.

== Title ==
The title of the film comes from Thomas Merton's poem of the same name, Original Child Bomb. The phrase "original child bomb" was derived from the Japanese term for the atom bomb, genshi bakudan. Genshi, which means "atom," contains root characters which, when rendered individually, can be taken to mean "original" and "child." Merton's poem claims, as does the documentary, that the Japanese called the weapon the "original child bomb" because the bomb was the first of its kind. It is unlikely, however, that native Japanese speakers would have translated genshi as such, or that the phrase "original child bomb" was ever used by the Japanese. This translation originates in John Hersey's "Hiroshima," a report drawn from his interviews with survivors of the Hiroshima bombing. He wrote, "The weapon was referred to in this word-of-mouth report as genshi bakudan - the root characters of which can be translated as 'original child bomb.'"

== Awards ==
At the 2004 AFI-Discovery Channel Silverdocs Documentary Festival, Original Child Bomb won the Sterling Award along with Death in Gaza. Grand Jury Prize winner at Bologna Human Rights Nights 2004.
