= Ronald E. Powaski =

American historian and teacher (1943–2019)

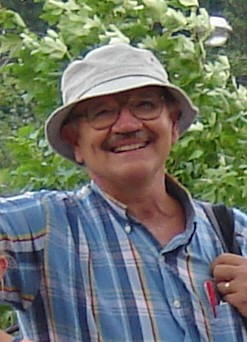
- Dr. Ronald Powaski (1943-2019)
- Born: June 15, 1943
- Died: November 2019 (aged 76)

Academic background
- Education: John Carroll University; Case Western Reserve University
- Thesis: Great Britain and the Manchurian crisis, 1931-1933 (1972)

Academic work
- Discipline: Historian
- Sub-discipline: American historian, 20th-century foreign policy
- Institutions: Euclid Senior High School; Cleveland State University; John Carroll University; Ashland University

Ronald E. Powaski (June 15, 1943 – November 2019) was an American historian and teacher. He taught American history in high schools and colleges in Ohio and wrote on the 20th century foreign policies of the United States and Europe.

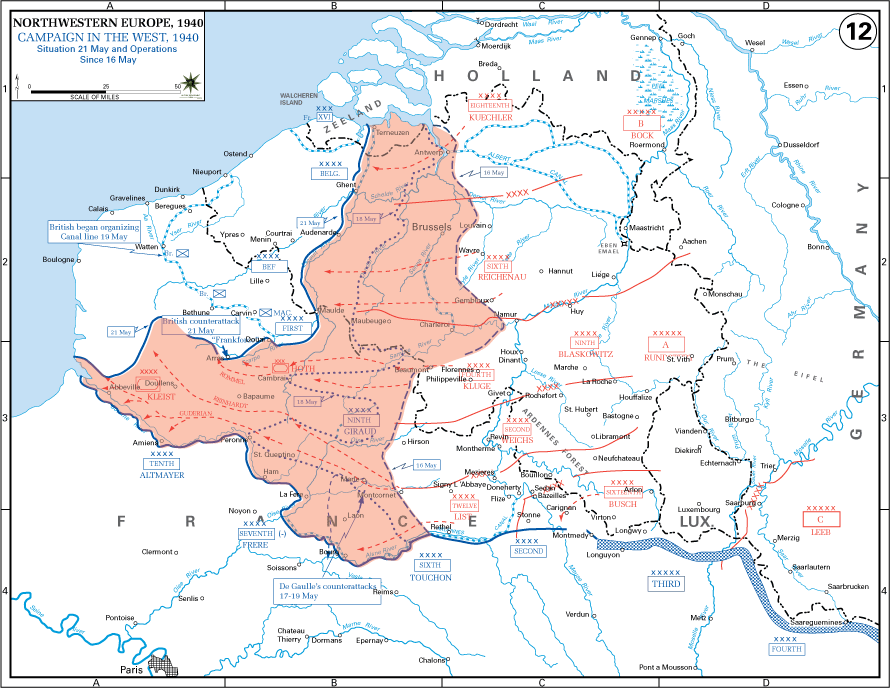
Ronald E. Powaski wrote a book on the blitzkrieg campaign of the German military in World War II.

== Biography ==
=== Early life and education ===
Ronald Powaski graduated from Cathedral Latin High School in 1960. He earned Bachelor of Arts and Master of Arts degrees in history from John Carroll University in 1964 and 1966 and his PhD from Case Western Reserve University in Cleveland in 1972 with a dissertation entitled "Great Britain and the Manchurian crisis, 1931-1933".

=== Career ===
Powaski taught history at Euclid Senior High School in Euclid, Ohio. He also taught at Cleveland State University, John Carroll University, and Ashland University.

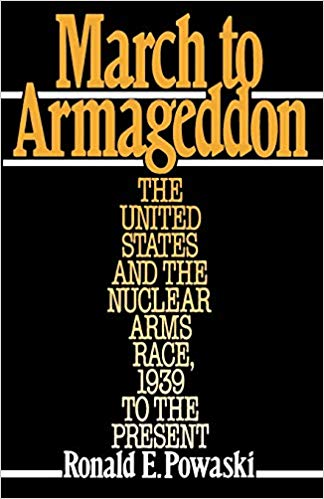
Cover of March to Armageddon

In 1989 he published March to Armageddon: The United States and the Nuclear Arms Race, 1939 to the Present. In the next two decades, he published 11 books covering the nuclear arms race, the creation of NATO, World War II, presidential statecraft, and presidential foreign policies.

== Books ==
- Powaski, Ronald Edward (1972). Great Britain and the Manchurian crisis, 1931-1933 (PhD). Case Western Reserve University.
- Powaski, Ronald E. (1987). March to Armageddon: the United States and the nuclear arms race, 1939 to the present. Oxford University Press US. ISBN 978-0-19-504411-9.
- Powaski, Ronald E.; Merton, Thomas (1988). Thomas Merton on Nuclear Weapons. Loyola University Press. ISBN 0-8294-0586-0.
- Powaski, Ronald E. (1991). Toward an entangling alliance: American isolationism, internationalism, and Europe, 1901–1950. Greenwood Publishing Group. ISBN 978-0-313-27274-5.
- Powaski, Ronald E. (1998). The Cold War: The United States and the Soviet Union, 1917-1991. Oxford University Press. ISBN 978-0-19-507850-3.
- Powaski, Ronald E. (2003). Return to Armageddon: The United States and the Nuclear Arms Race, 1981-1999. Oxford University Press. ISBN 978-0-19-516098-7.
- Powaski, Ronald E. (2008). Lightning War: Blitzkrieg in the West, 1940. Book Sales, Inc. ISBN 978-0-7858-2097-0.
- Powaski, Ronald E. (2017). American presidential statecraft: During the Cold War and after. Palgrave MacMillan. doi:10.1007/978-3-319-50454-4. ISBN 978-3-319-50453-7.

== Commentaries ==
- Powaski, Ronald E. (April 8, 2002). "End the cold war for good". The Christian Science Monitor.
- Powaski, Ronald E. "Bush's Nuclear Folly." America 189, no. 3 (August 4, 2003): 7. Education Research Complete, EBSCOhost (accessed March 30, 2010).
