= Charles L. Mee =

American dramatist (born 1938)

- Born: Charles Louis Mee Jr. September 15, 1938 (age 88); Evanston, Illinois, U.S.
- Education: Harvard University (BA)
- Spouse: Michi Barall
- Children: 5, Erin, Chaz, Sarah, Alice, Josie
- Relatives: Charles Louis Mee Sr. (father); Sarah Elizabeth (Lowe) Mee (mother)
- Writing career
- Notable awards: Obie Award
- Website: Official website

Charles Louis Mee Jr. (born September 15, 1938) is an American playwright, historian and author known for his collage-like style of playwriting, which makes use of radical reconstructions of found texts. He is also a Special Lecturer of theater at Columbia University.

== Early life and career ==
Charles L. Mee was born in Evanston, Illinois, the son of Charles Louis Mee Sr. and his wife Sarah Elizabeth (Lowe) Mee. He grew up in Barrington, Illinois, after the family moved there from Evanston. Mee contracted polio at the age of fourteen. His memoir A Nearly Normal Life (1999) tells how that event informed the rest of his life.

After graduating from Harvard University in 1960, Mee moved to Greenwich Village and became a part of the Off-Off-Broadway scene. Between 1962 and 1964, his plays were presented at venues that included La MaMa E.T.C., Caffe Cino, Theatre Genesis, and the Ontological-Hysteric Theater.

In 1961 Mee began work at American Heritage publishing company and eventually became the editor of the hardback bi-monthly Horizon: A Magazine of the Arts. He was also the Advising Editor and then Contributing Editor of Tulane Drama Review – now called TDR and published from New York University – until 1964 and its Associate Editor from 1964 to 1965.

== Literary career ==
To support himself and his family, Mee turned from writing plays to writing books in 1965. Lorenzo De'Medici and the Renaissance, the first of his many nonfiction books, was published in 1969 by HarperCollins Juvenile Books. At the same time, he increasingly became caught up in anti-Vietnam War politics, campaigning for anti-war congressional candidates and writing anti-war polemics. He did not return to writing for the theater for 20 years.

In the 1970s, he became the co-founder and chairman of The National Committee on the Presidency, a grassroots organization which called for the impeachment of Richard Nixon. His political activism led to his writing of political histories for the general public.

His Meeting at Potsdam (1975), about the 1945 Potsdam Conference, was chosen as a main selection of the Literary Guild, and was adapted for both film and television by David Susskind. He wrote other books on summit diplomacy, international power sharing, and American history, including The End of Order: Versailles 1919 (1980); The Marshall Plan: The Launching of Pax Americana (1987), and The Genius of the People (1987), about the 1787 Constitutional Convention. Playing God: Seven Fateful Moments When Great Men Met to Change the World (1993) was Mee's final published work of history.

A Visit to Haldeman and Other States of Mind (1976) was described as "part autobiographical meditation, part elegiac crank letter to the American Republic, part confession and part essay on democratic politics" in a review by Time. Greil Marcus, in 2002, said that it was one of the best books he had read about American patriotism. In 2017, Dwight Garner in his New York Times "American Beauties" column, about "undersung American books of the past 75 years," described the work as "[o]ne of the finest and least-known books about Richard M. Nixon's presidency and the shrinking American soul".

== Playwriting career ==
Mee returned to playwriting in 1985. His libretto for choreographer Martha Clarke's Vienna: Lusthaus was his first produced script since his Off-Off Broadway days. In 2002 Mee revised about a third of his Vienna: Lusthaus script. It was reprised as Vienna: Lusthaus (Revisited). Clarke and Mee collaborated again in Belle Époque (2004). For years he continued working his day job as the editor-in-chief at consumer health publisher Rebus, Inc. and writing books.

Mee's daughter, Erin B. Mee, also became involved in theater. In 1988 she was invited to direct a production at HOME for Contemporary Theatre and Art in SoHo. She chose to premiere her father's play, The Imperialists at the Club Cave Canem (1988), which received positive reviews from The Village Voice and The New York Times. The play was picked up by Joseph Papp for a run at The Public Theater. In 2000 Erin B. Mee staged another production of The Imperialists at the Club Cave Canem at The Market Theatre in Cambridge, Massachusetts, which she updated with the dramaturg for this production.

Another Person is a Foreign Country (1991) was the first of Mee's many collaborations with the director Anne Bogart. The En Garde Arts site-specific performance took place in the courtyard of the decrepit Towers Nursing Home in New York City.

In 1992 his Orestes was directed by Robert Woodruff at the University of California, San Diego and by Anne Bogart at the Saratoga International Theater Institute (SITI). In the summer of 1992, Tina Landau directed an En Garde Arts production as Orestes 2.0 on an abandoned pier on the Hudson River in Manhattan.

This play was the first of ten plays for which Mee used the Greek texts as a base and added new fragments of text; he then would "throw the scaffolding away and call whatever remained the script." In 1996, his The Constitutional Convention: A Sequel, was produced by Clubbed Thumb.

In 2001 Erin B. Mee staged the premiere of her father's First Love at New York Theatre Workshop. He had written it specifically for her to direct, and it starred Ruth Maleczech and Fred Neumann of Mabou Mines. Erin Mee staged a second production in 2002 at the Magic Theatre in San Francisco with Joan Mankin and Robert Parnell.

In other plays, Mee explores twentieth-century American history and culture through the points-of-view of contemporary visual artists in: bobrauschenbergamerica (Robert Rauschenberg), Hotel Cassiopeia (Joseph Cornell), soot and spit (the musical) (James Castle), and Under Construction (Jason Rhoades and Norman Rockwell).

His comedies and romances include Summertime, First Love, True Love, Big Love, Wintertime, Fetes de la Nuit, A Perfect Wedding, and Fire Island. As source material, Mee would use Greek tragedy, Shakespeare, Molière, Anton Chekhov, René Magritte paintings, Bollywood musicals, and his own writing.

He is the only resident playwright of the theatre ensemble SITI Company, for whom he wrote Orestes, bobrauschenbergamerica, Hotel Cassiopeia, Under Construction, and soot and spit (the musical). Mee was the Signature Theatre Playwright-in-Residence for the 2007–2008 season.

In 2008, Shakespeare and Renaissance scholar Stephen Greenblatt collaborated with Mee to write Cardenio. It premiered at American Repertory Theater (A.R.T.) in 2008.

In 2014 Mee co-wrote This Is Not A Theatre Company's Pool Play. Audiences sat at the edge of the pool with their feet in the water for an exploration of America's long, joyful, and complicated relationship with the swimming pool. The production included synchronized swimming, an existential boatman, musical numbers, and a snarky fish, along with stories about segregated pools, and a meditation on pollution.

Sarah Lucie of Show Business Weekly said:

The entirety of the play is well executed, featuring a strong ensemble that has absolutely no fear of diving into whatever quirky material is presented to them. Their playfulness is contagious, ultimately creating an uplifting theatrical experience that leaves the audience joyous and refreshed—and maybe a little wet. Pool Play, while undeniably light-hearted, manages to communicate some profound and political themes to those who choose to pay attention.

Theatre is Easy wrote:

Pool Play ... is definitely worth the trip ... The entire ensemble showed moments of skill, wit, and brevity far beyond their years. Erin B. Mee does a superb job directing this young group of artists to create a cohesive look at our fascination with the water, entertaining and engaging the audience along the way.

In fall 2015 Mee co-wrote Versailles 2015, a site-specific play for a New York City apartment, conceived and directed by Erin B. Mee. New York Theatre Review noted that "Versailles 2015 is over far too quickly. It is an hors d'oeuvre plate of scenes that collectively ... have a message about elitism and the vanity of apathy ... Brief and poignant, Versailles 2015 will linger in your mind long after you see it." Courtney Escoyne of Thoughts from a Ballet Nerd wrote: "Versailles 2015 is a meditation upon privilege…It blurred the lines between audience and performer, ignored entirely the idea of a fourth wall, and managed to fit in some wonderfully crafted dialogue." Finally, Stephen Kaplan of Theatre Is Easy said: "Delightful and provocative ... Amidst the countless atrocities that confront us every day, at our core we are all struggling to find the naked honesty in our own lives ... Versailles 2015 allows us the time to contemplate this in its characters and in ourselves."

Mee's play The Glory of The World about Thomas Merton, a noted Trappist monk and activist, was directed by Les Waters at the Actors Theatre of Louisville in the spring of 2015. It transferred to the Brooklyn Academy of Music in February 2016, with support from philanthropist Roy Cockrum.

Mee teaches playwriting at the Columbia University School of the Arts.

== Style and method of writing ==
On Mee's website, the (re)making project, he says "There is no such thing as an original play." and that his plays are "composed in the way that Max Ernst made his Fatagaga pieces toward the end of World War I: texts have often been taken from, or inspired by, other texts." An interview with Mee about his work by Erin B. Mee, along with a manifesto and other material, was published in TDR 46:3 (T175).

== Use of the Internet ==
Mee began using the internet as a textual source for composing his pieces in the early 1990s. He first began making his own work freely available by posting three of his plays on Carnegie Mellon's humanities gopher/ftp/telnet English Server in the mid-1990s. By 1996, with the help of his friend Tom Damrauer, the (re)making project, a web site with his full scripts was launched. It contained an invitation for people to "do freely whatever they want with them." He is the first and only playwright to make such a large body of theatre work available on the internet.

This was not viewed by Mee as a challenge to the current copyright law or a vehicle to raise issues of intellectual property. It was done as a populist gesture towards his utopian vision of a free and democratic internet. In 1996 he said "I'm attracted to the idea of things being owned in common." It also represented "Mee's Golden Rule: of do unto my writing as I have done unto the writing of others."

National Public Radio called Mee the "Public-Domain Playwright" in 2000 and credited him with touching "a raw cultural nerve" by making his work freely available.

Writer Jonathan Lethem credited Mee as one of the inspirations for his "Promiscuous Project" in which he made a selection of his stories available for filmmakers or dramatists to adapt at a dollar apiece.

In an explanation about the (re)making project on his current website, Mee says that his plays are protected by copyright if they are "essentially or substantially performed" as he has composed them. He continues, however, to invite others to freely pillage his texts to make their own work, without any attribution to him.

== Patronage ==
In 1998, Mee's friend, former chairman of Morgan Stanley and philanthropist Richard B. Fisher and his wife, Jeanne Donovan Fisher, offered to provide Mee with enough money to support himself. The rare arrangement imposed no stipulations or conditions upon Mee or his writing nor did it specify how long the relationship would last. Although Richard B. Fisher died in 2004, Jeanne Donovan Fisher continues to support Mee and his work. The Fishers patronage has been hailed as one "without parallel or precedent in American theatrical philanthropy."

Sometime in 2013, concurrent with the launch of a redesigned website, the language regarding patronage changed to the past tense: "Charles Mee's work has been made possible by the support of Richard B. Fisher and Jeanne Donovan Fisher." It is now possible to directly support the project.

== Awards ==
Among other awards, Charles Mee is the recipient of an Award of Merit Medal in drama from the American Academy of Arts and Letters, two Obie Awards, for Vienna: Lusthaus (1986) with Martha Clarke, and Big Love (2002), PEN/Laura Pels Theater Award for a playwright in mid-career, and the Fisher Award given by the Brooklyn Academy of Music.

== Selected books ==
- Lorenzo De'Medici and the Renaissance. HarperCollins Children's Books. 1969.
- White Robe, Black Robe. G.P. Putnam. 1972.
- Meeting at Potsdam. New York: M. Evans & Co. 1975. ISBN 9780871311672.
- A Visit to Haldeman and Other States of Mind. M. Evans & Co. 1976.
- Seizure. M. Evans & Co. 1977. ISBN 9780871312549.
- The Ohio Gang. M. Evans & Co. 1980.
- The End of Order: Versailles 1919. Dutton. 1980. ISBN 9780525098102.
- The Marshall Plan. Simon and Schuster. 1984.
- Genius of the People. HarperCollins. 1988.
- Rembrandt's Portrait: A Biography. Simon & Schuster. 1990.
- Playing God: Seven Fateful Moments When Great Men Met to Change the World. Simon and Schuster. 1993.
- History Plays. Johns Hopkins University Press. 1998. (collection consisting of Vienna Lusthaus, The War to End War, The Investigation of the Murder in El Salvador, Orestes, The Trojan Women a Love Story, Time to Burn)
- A Nearly Normal Life. Little, Brown and Co. 1999. ISBN 9780316558525.

== Plays ==
(Note: Charles Mee's complete scripts are freely available on his web site, the (re)making project. Dates listed are provided by Scott T. Cummings. They do not reflect when the work was actually written. Mee often writes the plays a year or more before they are produced. The play categories are Mee's own. He also makes his unproduced (undated) plays available on the (re)making project.)

- Solos
  - The House of Cards (originally produced under the title
    of Chiang Kai Chek (premiered 1996)
  - Life is a Dream (originally produced under the title
    of My House is Collapsing Toward One Side) (premiered 1996)
  - Salome (premiered 2003)
- Duets
  - First Love (premiered 2001)
  - Limonade Tous les Jours (premiered 2002)
- The Trilogy: Imperial Dreams
  - I. Iphigenia 2.0 (premiered 2007)
  - II. Trojan Women: A Love Story (premiered 1994)
  - III. Orestes 2.0 (premiered 1992)
- Other Tragedies and History Plays
  - Agamemnon 2.0 (premiered 1994)
  - The Bacchae 2.1 (premiered 1993)
  - The Constitutional Convention: A Sequel (premiered 1996)
  - Full Circle (premiered 1998)
  - Bedtime Stories (originally produced under the title
    of The Imperialists at the Club Cave Canem (premiered 1988)
  - The Investigation (originally produced under the title
    of The Investigation of the Murder in El Salvador) (premiered 1989)
  - Time to Burn (premiered 1997)
  - True Love (premiered 2001)
  - The War to End War (premiered 1993)
- Fragments
  - Gone (premiered 2007)
  - Requiem for the Dead (workshopped 2003)
- The Lives of the Artists
  - bobrauschenbergamerica (premiered 2001)
  - Hotel Cassiopeia (premiered 2006)
  - Picasso's Masterpiece
  - Self Portrait
  - soot and spit
  - Under Construction (premiered 2009)
- Comedies and Romances
  - Big Love (premiered 2000)
  - Fetes de la Nuit (premiered 2005)
  - Fire Island (premiered 2008)
  - A Perfect Wedding (premiered 2004)
  - Paradise Park (premiered 2008)
  - Summertime (premiered 2000)
  - Wintertime (premiered 2005)
  - Cardenio (written with Stephen Greenblatt) (premiered 2008)
- Dance Theatre Pieces
  - American Document (premiered 2010)
  - Another Person Is a Foreign Country (premiered 1991)
  - Belle Époque (premiered 2004)
  - Café le Monde
  - Daily Life Everlasting
  - Eterniday
  - The Four Seasons
  - Heaven on Earth (workshopped 2009)
  - The Life Of George Washington
  - Memory Palace
  - Night and Day
    - Night (Thyestes 2.0)(premiered 2015)
    - Day (Daphnis and Chloe 2.0)
  - Vienna: Lusthaus (premiered 1986)
  - A Walk in the Park
- The Streets of New York
  - The New World Order
  - Coney Island Avenue (premiered 2009)
  - The Mail Order Bride (reading 2004)
  - Queens Boulevard (premiered 2009)
  - Utopia Parkway (workshopped 2002)
