= Roy Cockrum =

American lottery winner and philanthropist

Roy Cockrum (born 1955 or 1956) is an American lottery winner and philanthropist. He is a former actor and Episcopal monk. The foundation he started with his lotto winnings supports professional theater in the United States.

== Life and career ==
Cockrum went to high school in Knoxville, Tennessee, and studied theater at Northwestern University, graduating in 1978. He apprenticed at the Virginia Shakespeare Festival and Actors Theater of Louisville, and worked as an actor for 21 years in Chicago and New York. He appeared in commercials and the off-Broadway show Vampire Lesbians of Sodom, playing two supporting roles. He worked various day jobs as a server, proofreader, and hand model.

After the September 11 attacks, Cockrum left the theater and became a postulant of the Episcopal Society of St John the Evangelist in Cambridge, Massachusetts. Sometime after seeing the stage adaptation of His Dark Materials in London in 2004, he declined to take the vows to remain a monk, and moved back to Knoxville to care for his parents.

== Lottery win ==
In 2014 he won a $259 million Powerball lottery jackpot, electing to take a $153.5 million lump sum. He used about $60 million of winnings to form the Roy Cockrum Foundation, which contributes money to nonprofit theaters in the United States.

While Cockrum has personally supported causes like Doctors Without Borders and the Knoxville Symphony, the Foundation only supports theater.

The Foundation prefers to support large, ambitious productions, such as a two-part adaptation of all three of Shakespeare's Henry VI plays at The Old Globe. The production titled Henry 6 featured 32 performers and received $1.8 million in support from the Foundation.

The first projects the Foundation supported were a five-hour adaptation of the novel 2666 at the Goodman Theatre and a production of Mary Page Marlowe at Steppenwolf Theatre Company. The Foundation also gave $1.2 million to support stipends for apprentices at the Actors Theater of Louisville.

In 2016, Cockrum produced The Glory of the World by Charles Mee, about the monk Thomas Merton, at the Brooklyn Academy of Music.
