= Thomas Merton bibliography =

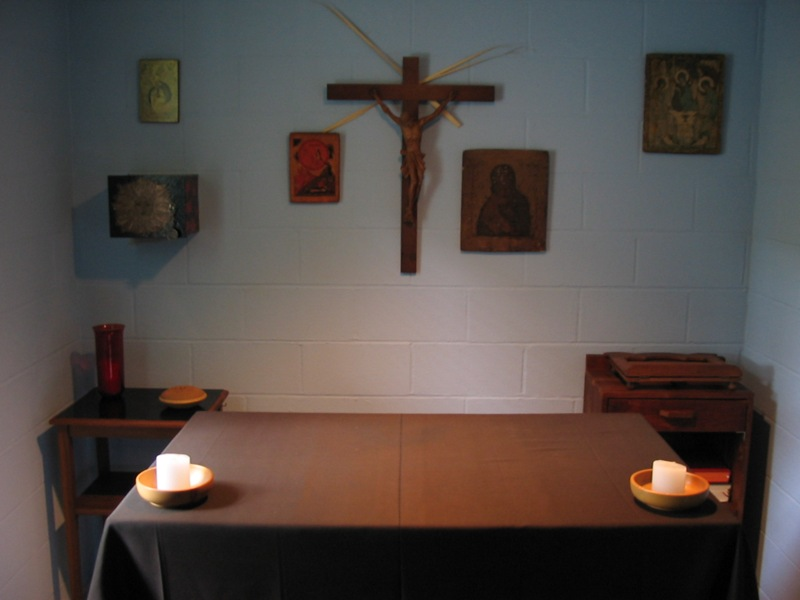
Thomas Merton's hermitage (interior) at the Abbey of Gethsemani

Below is a bibliography of published works written by Thomas Merton, the Trappist monk of The Abbey of Our Lady of Gethsemani. Several of the works listed here have been published posthumously. The works are listed under each category by date of publication.

== Autobiographies ==
- The Seven Storey Mountain. Harcourt Brace. 1948. OCLC 385657.
- The Sign of Jonas. Harcourt Brace. 1953. OCLC 386887.
- Day of a Stranger. Peregrine Smith. 1981. ISBN 0-87905-092-6. OCLC 7653290.

== Biblical topics ==
- Bread in the Wilderness. New Directions. 1953. OCLC 371126.
- The Living Bread. Farrar, Straus & Cudahy. 1956. OCLC 386309.
- Praying the Psalms. The Liturgical Press. 1956.
- He Is Risen. Argus Communications. 1975. ISBN 0-913592-58-7.

== Biographies ==
- Exile Ends in Glory: The Life of a Trappistine, Mother M. Berchmans, O.C.S.O. Bruce Publishing Company. 1948. OCLC 932012.
- What are these wounds?: The Life of a Cistercian Mystic, Saint Lutgarde of Aywières. Clonmore and Reynolds. 1948. OCLC 2952957.
- The Last of the Fathers: Saint Bernard of Clairvaux and the Encyclical Letter, Doctor Mellifluus. Harcourt Brace. 1954. OCLC 502123.

== Contemplation and meditations ==
- Seeds of Contemplation. New Directions. 1949. OCLC 225115.
- The Ascent to Truth. Harcourt Brace. 1951. OCLC 172787.
- Disputed Questions. Farrar, Straus and Cudahy. 1960. OCLC 386651.
- New Seeds of Contemplation. London: Burns & Oates. 1962. OCLC 43261344.
- Raids on the Unspeakable. New Directions. 1966. OCLC 1155682. (Preview at Google Books)
- Conjectures of a Guilty Bystander. DoubleDay. 1966. OCLC 712184.
- The Climate of Monastic Prayer. Liturgical Press. 2018. OCLC 1015271272. [1st published 1968] Republished in the UK as Where Prayer Flourishes. Canterbury Press. 2018. OCLC 1042336195.
- Contemplative Prayer. Herder and Herder. 1969. OCLC 16848.
- What is Contemplation. Templegate. 1978. [1st published 1950]

== Eastern thought ==
- The Way of Chuang Tzu. New Directions. 1965. OCLC 783366.
- Mystics and Zen Masters. Farrar, Straus and Giroux. 1967. OCLC 377395.
- Zen and the Birds of Appetite. New Directions. 1968. OCLC 276806.
- The Inner Experience. 2003.

== Journal writings ==
- Run to the Mountain: The Story of a Vocation (The Journals of Thomas Merton, volume I: 1939–1941). 1995.
- Entering the Silence: Becoming a Monk and Writer (Journals, II: 1941–1952). 1996.
- A Search for Solitude: Pursuing the Monk's True Life (Journals, III: 1952–1960). 1996.
- Turning Toward the World: The Pivotal Years (Journals, IV: 1960–1963). 1996.
- Dancing in the Water of Life: Seeking Peace in the Hermitage (Journals, V: 1963–1965). 1997.
- Learning to Love: Exploring Solitude and Freedom (Journals VI: 1966–1967). 1997.
- The Other Side of the Mountain: The End of the Journey (Journals VII: 1967–1968). 1998.
- The Secular Journal of Thomas Merton. Farrar, Straus & Cudahy. 1959. OCLC 14521398.
- The Asian Journal of Thomas Merton. New Directions. 1973. ISBN 0-8112-0464-2.
- Woods, Shore and Desert: A Notebook, May 1968. Museum of New Mexico Press. 1982. ISBN 0-89013-140-6.
- A Vow of Conversation: Journals 1964–1965. 1988.
- The Intimate Merton: His Life from His Journals. 1999.
- Cassian and the Fathers: Notes for Conferences Given in the Choir Novitiate, Abbey of Gethsemani. 2005. OCLC 16520690.

== Letters ==
- The Hidden Ground of Love: Letters on Religious Experience and Social Concerns (Letters, I). 1985.
- The Road to Joy: Letter to New and Old Friends (Letters, II). 1989.
- The School of Charity: Letters on Religious Renewal and Spiritual Direction (Letters, III). 1990.
- The Courage for Truth: Letters to Writers (Letters, IV). 1993.
- Witness to Freedom: Letters in Times of Crisis (Letters, V). 1994.
- Merton, Thomas; Czeslaw, Milosz (1997). Striving Towards Being: The Letters of Thomas Merton and Czeslaw Milosz. Farrar, Straus and Giroux.
- Merton, Thomas; LeClercq, Jean (2002). Survival or Prophecy?: The Letters of Thomas Merton and Jean LeClercq. Farrar, Straus and Giroux.
- Papagni, Mario (2006). The Cold War Letters of Thomas Merton. M.A. Thesis: Spring Hill College. OCLC 51181592.
- Merton, Thomas (2008). William H. Shannon; Christine M. Bochen (eds.). Thomas Merton: A Life In Letters. Harperone. ISBN 978-0-06-134832-7. OCLC 276930483.
- Merton, Thomas (2010). William H. Shannon; Christine M. Bochen (eds.). Thomas Merton: A Life In Letters. Notre Dame, Indiana: Ave Maria Press. ISBN 978-1-59471-256-2.

== Monastic, church and spiritual life ==
- The Waters of Siloe. Harcourt Brace. 1949. OCLC 386181.
- No Man Is an Island. Harcourt Brace. 1955. OCLC 388043.
- Silence in Heaven. Studio. 1956.
- The Silent Life. Farrar, Straus & Cudahy. 1957. OCLC 774280.
- Thoughts in Solitude. Farrar, Straus & Cudahy. 1958. OCLC 388042.
- The Wisdom of the Desert: Sayings From the Desert Fathers of the Fourth Century. New Directions. 1960. OCLC 943800.
- Spiritual Direction and Meditation. Liturgical Press. 1960. OCLC 255764.
- The New Man. Farrar, Straus & Cudahy. 1961. OCLC 710446.
- Life and Holiness. Herder and Herder. 1963. OCLC 387439.
- Seasons of Celebration. Farrar, Straus and Giroux. 1965. OCLC 386274.
- Gethsemani: A Life of Praise. 1966. OCLC 969279.
- Contemplation in a World of Action. Doubleday. 1971. OCLC 127701.
- Cistercian Life. Cistercian Book Services. 1974.
- Merton, Thomas; Hart, Patrick (1977). The Monastic Journey. Sheldon Press. ISBN 0-85969-108-X. OCLC 3423688.
- Merton, Thomas; Burton, Naomi; Hart, Patrick (1979). Love and Living. Harcourt Brace Jovanovich. ISBN 0-15-653895-4.
- Merton, Thomas; Daggy, Robert E. (1981). Introductions East and West: The Foreign Prefaces of Thomas Merton. Unicorn Press. ISBN 0-87775-139-0. OCLC 59232683.
- Opening the Bible. 1986.
- Thomas Merton in Alaska: The Alaskan Conferences, Journals and Letters. 1988.
- Dialogues with Silence. 2001.
- Love and Living. Harcourt Trade Publishers. 2002. ISBN 0-15-602799-2.
- Seeking Paradise: The Spirit of the Shakers. 2003.

== Novel ==
- My Argument with the Gestapo: A Macaronic Journal. Doubleday. 1969. OCLC 13332.

== Poetry ==
- Thirty Poems. New Directions. 1944. OCLC 1911736.
- A Man in the Divided Sea. New Directions. 1946. OCLC 1454855.
- The Tears of the Blind Lions. New Directions. 1949. OCLC 224716.
- The Strange Islands: Poems. New Directions. 1957. OCLC 289506.
- Selected Poems. J. Laughlin. 1959. OCLC 123120117.
- Emblems of a Season of Fury. New Directions. 1963. OCLC 289508.
- Monks Pond: No. 1, 1968. 1968. OCLC 170840170.
- Cables to the Ace. New Directions. 1968. OCLC 439169.
- The Geography of Lograire. New Directions. 1969. OCLC 58131.
- The Collected Poems of Thomas Merton. New Directions. 1977. ISBN 0-8112-0643-2.
- In The Dark Before Dawn: New Selected Poems of Thomas Merton. New Directions. 2005. ISBN 0-8112-1613-6. OCLC 57414753.

== Social issues ==
- Seeds of Destruction. Farrar, Straus and Giroux. 1964. OCLC 306973.
- Gandhi on Non-Violence. New Directions. 1965. OCLC 60860722.
- Faith and Violence. University of Notre Dame Press. 1968. OCLC 327320.
- The Non-Violent Alternative. Farrar, Straus and Giroux. 1980. OCLC 174711710. (Revised ed. of Thomas Merton On Peace. The McCall Publishing Company. 1971.)
- Peace in a Post-Christian Era. 2004.

== Other ==
- The Behavior of Titans. New Directions. 1961. OCLC 1086883.
- Merton, Thomas (1976). Ishi means man. Unicorn keepsake series. Vol. 8. foreword by Dorothy Day, woodblock by Rita Corbin. Greensboro, N. C.: Unicorn Press. ISBN 0-87775-100-5.
- Merton, Thomas; Hart, Patrick (1981). The Literary Essays of Thomas Merton. New Directions.
- Merton, Thomas (1992). Thomas Merton: Spiritual Master. edited by Laurence S. Cunningham. Paulist Press.

== See also ==
- List of works about Thomas Merton
