= Tsewang Yishey Pemba =

Dr. Tsewang Yishey Pemba (5 June 1931 – 26 November 2011) MBBS (London) FRCS was the first Tibetan to become a doctor in western medicine, and to become a Fellow of the Royal College of Surgeons. He founded the first hospital in Bhutan. He is also credited for writing the first work of fiction by a Tibetan in English, Idols on the Path, published in 1966, and is also regarded as the first Tibetan to publish a book in English, Young Days in Tibet, published by Jonathan Cape in 1957.

== Biography ==
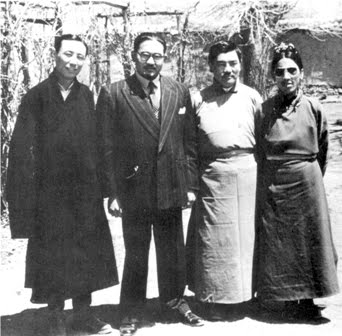
Lhamo Tsering, Sumal Sinha, Pemba Tsering, Phuntsok Tashi Takla, Lhasa 1952

Dr. Pemba was born in 1931 in Gyantse, Tibet. His father was Rai Saheb Pemba Tsering, a prominent member of the British Political Office having served as British Trade Agent. The Pemba family had also made Gangtok their home, living in the residence of the late Tashi Tsering, President of Sikkim State Congress.

Tsewang "Yishy" Pemba had no formal education until the age of nine when he started in 1941 at Victoria Boys School in Kurseong where he was until 1948. Decades later he wrote about his experience. In 1949 he went to read Medicine at London University at University College and University College Hospital. In 1955, Tsewang Pemba graduated with an M.B. and BSc degrees, the first Tibetan student to receive British medical qualifications. He then was recruited by the future Prime Minister of Bhutan, Jigme Dorji, to establish that country's first hospital and worked in Bhutan from 1956 to 1958. In 1959, Dr. Pemba moved to Darjeeling where he worked until 1965 for Dooars and Darjeeling Medical Association Hospital (DDMA) run by the Indian Tea Association when he also looked after the Tibetan Refugee School and the Tibetan Refugee Self-Help Centre. In 1959, the uprising in Lhasa, Tibet, against the occupying Chinese forces caused thousands of refugees to India, and many to Darjeeling. Pemba volunteered to work at the Tibetan Refugee School and soon became a well-known figure amongst many high-ranking Tibetan lamas; those he treated included Rangjung Rigpe Dorje, the 16th Karmapa; Dilgo Khyentse Rimpoche; Dudjom Rinpoche, an incarnation of a 1,000-year-old line of spiritual masters; Great Dzongsar Khyentse Chökyi Lodrö; Chatral Rinpoche; Kalu Rinpoche; Tai Situ Rinpoche and Shamarpa.

In 1965 he returned to Britain to specialize in surgery and 1966 he was awarded the Hallett Prize for coming first in the primary examinations of the Royal College of Surgeons; he became a Fellow in 1967. He returned to Darjeeling to work until about the mid-1980s, at this time he befriended Thomas Merton. Dr. Pemba, then returned to Bhutan to become Superintendent of the National Referral Hospital, Thimphu. He was also appointed to be a United Nations certifying doctor and sat on the committee devising a Bhutan national formulary. In 1989, was a member of the Bhutan delegation to WHO in Geneva. While in Bhutan, Dr Pemba served as consulting physician to Bhutan's royal family in this period as well.

Dr Tsewang Yishey Pemba died at Siliguri on 26 November 2011. He is survived by four children. A fifth child predeceased him in 2009. His wife, Tsering Sangmo, died in 2016.

== Books ==
- Young Days in Tibet (1957). Autobiography.
- Idols on the Path (1966). The first novel written by a Tibetan in English.
- White Crane, Lend Me Your Wings (2017, Delhi: Niyogi Books). Posthumously published work.
- Tibet as I Knew It: The Memoir of Dr. Tsewang Yishey Pemba
- Journal of a Doctor to Tibetan Mystics and Masters (2023, Blackneck Books). Non-fiction.
