= Richard Rohr =

American Franciscan priest and writer

Richard Rohr OFM
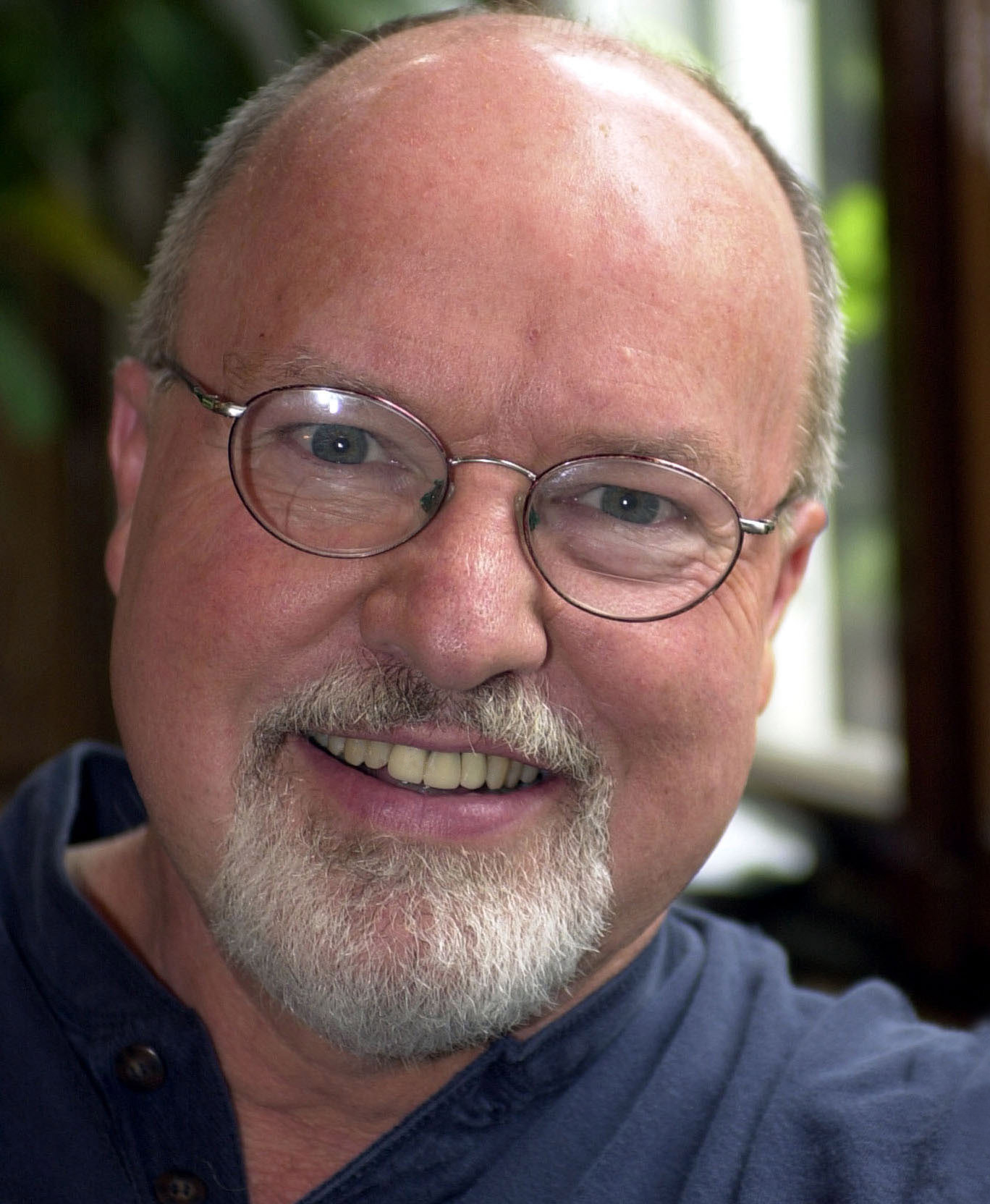
- Born: March 20, 1943 (age 83); Topeka, Kansas
- Occupations: Author, priest
- Writing career
- Period: 1972–present
- Subjects: Theology, spirituality

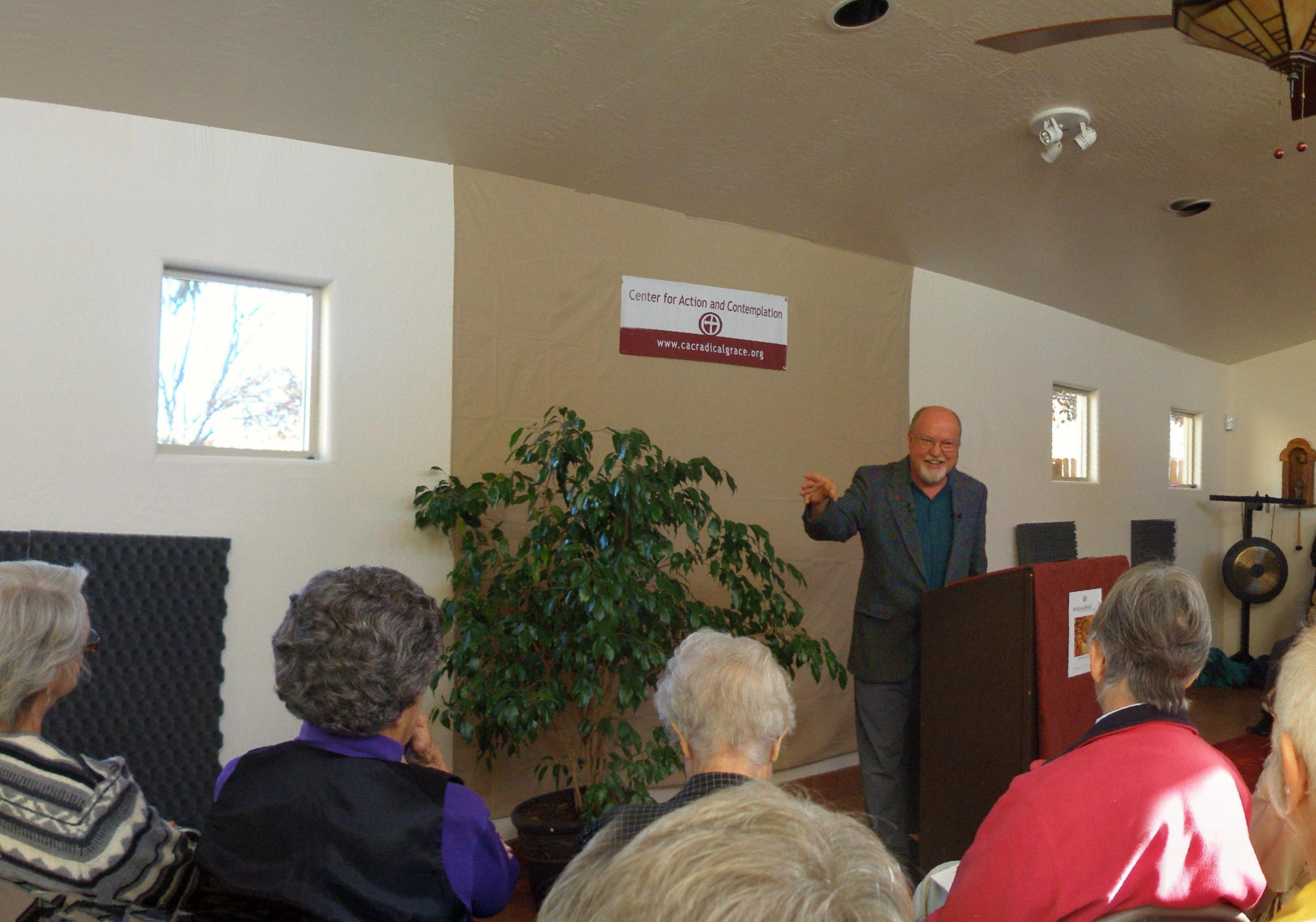
Webcast with Rohr

Richard Rohr, OFM (born 1943) is an American Franciscan priest and writer on spirituality based in Albuquerque, New Mexico. He was ordained to the priesthood in the Roman Catholic Church in 1970, founded the New Jerusalem Community in Cincinnati in 1971, and the Center for Action and Contemplation in Albuquerque in 1987. In 2011, PBS called him "one of the most popular spirituality authors and speakers in the world".

Rohr's notable works include The Universal Christ, Falling Upward, and Everything Belongs. His spirituality is rooted in Christian mysticism and the perennial tradition.

== Life and ministry ==
Rohr was born in Kansas in 1943. He entered the Franciscans in 1961 and was ordained to the priesthood in 1970. He received his Master of Theology degree in 1970 from the University of Dayton. Rohr founded the New Jerusalem Community in Cincinnati, Ohio, in 1971 and the Center for Action and Contemplation (CAC) in Albuquerque, New Mexico, in 1986, where he serves as founding director and academic dean of the Living School for Action and Contemplation. The curriculum of Rohr's school is founded on seven themes developed by Rohr and explored in his book Yes, And.... Core faculty members include James Finley, Brian McLaren, Barbara Holmes and Cynthia Bourgeault.

On July 1, 2022, Pope Francis met with Rohr, who said that Francis expressed support for his work. Later that year, Rohr announced he would step back from public ministry following a lymphoma diagnosis. He was previously diagnosed with prostate cancer in 2017, and suffered a severe heart attack in 2018.

== Teachings and views ==
Rohr emphasizes "alternative orthodoxy", a term the Franciscan tradition has applied to itself, referring to a focus on "orthopraxy"—a belief that lifestyle and practice are much more important than mere verbal orthodoxy, which he feels is much overlooked in Catholic preaching today. According to Rohr's teachings, following Jesus is the "best shortcut" to salvation, but one does not necessarily have to practice formal Christianity. The key is to "fall in love with the divine presence, under whatever name." Rohr says people are disillusioned with conservative churches that teach that nonbelievers and followers of non-Christian religions go to Hell. Rohr additionally states: "I'm not trying to be some New Age liberal who flattens the universe out. Quite the contrary. I'm trying to invite people into the depth of things... and that's why I still encourage people to be loyal to their primary tradition; to go deep in one place, as I've often put it."

The perennial philosophy forms the basis of much of Rohr's teaching; his work's essential message focuses on the union of divine reality with all things and the human potential and longing for this union. Rohr and other 21st-century spiritual leaders explore the perennial tradition in the Center for Action and Contemplation's issue of the publication Oneing. In a similar vein, he sometimes draws on spiral dynamics and Ken Wilber's integral theory. Psychological concepts from Carl Jung and the Enneagram of Personality are also recurring themes in his work.

In his book Immortal Diamond: The Search for Our True Self, Rohr describes Jesus's death and resurrection as a historical event that perfectly illustrates the pattern of movement from "false self" to "true self" in human spiritual development; from "who you think you are" to "who you are in God." In The Universal Christ (2019), he expands on this theme by writing:

Jesus' first incarnate life, his passing over into death, and his resurrection into the ongoing Christ life is the archetypal model for the entire pattern of creation. He is the microcosm for the whole cosmos, or the map of the whole journey.

Rohr's 2014 book Eager to Love explores the key themes of Franciscan spirituality, which he sees as a "third way" between traditional orthodoxy and heresy, a way of focusing on the Gospel, justice, and compassion.

=== Role of scripture ===
In his teaching on scripture, such as in his book Things Hidden, Rohr calls the Biblical record a human account of humanity's evolving experience with God, "the word of God in the words of people." In one of his daily meditations, Rohr writes:

The Bible is an anthology of many books. It is a record of people's experience of God's self-revelation. It is an account of our very human experience of the divine intrusion into history. The book did not fall from heaven in a pretty package. It was written by people trying to listen to God. I believe that the Spirit was guiding the listening and writing process. We must also know that humans always see "through a glass darkly ... and all knowledge is imperfect" (1 Corinthians 13:12).

=== Role of the Church ===
In his 2016 book The Divine Dance, Rohr suggests that the top-down hierarchy of Western Christianity since Emperor Constantine has held ecumenical traditions back for centuries and that the future of people of faith will have to involve a bottom-up approach. Rohr maintains what he would call prophetic positions, on the "edge of the inside" of a church that he sees as failing to transform people, and thus increasingly irrelevant. Rohr explains:

To live on the edge of the inside is different than being an insider, a "company man" or a dues paying member. Yes, you have learned the rules and you understand and honor the system as far as it goes, but you do not need to protect it, defend it or promote it. It has served its initial and helpful function. You have learned the rules well enough to know how to "break the rules" without really breaking them at all. "Not to abolish the law but to complete it" as Jesus rightly puts it (Matthew 5:17). A doorkeeper must love both the inside and the outside of his or her group, and know how to move between these two loves.

=== Nature of God ===
In his 2019 book The Universal Christ, Rohr says he is a panentheist. He goes on to state that panentheism is the true position of Jesus and Paul:

But Paul merely took incarnationalism to its universal and logical conclusions. We see that in his bold exclamation, "There is only Christ. He is everything and he is in everything" (Colossians 3:11). If I were to write that today, people would call me a pantheist (the universe is God), whereas I am really a panentheist (God lies within all things, but also transcends them), exactly like both Jesus and Paul.

=== Views of Jesus' death on the cross ===
He rejects the evangelical Christian belief that Jesus's death on the cross was an appeasement of the wrath of an angry God that had to punish someone no matter what in order to forgive sin. Rohr instead states that "I believe that Jesus' death on the cross is a revelation of the infinite and participatory love of God, not some bloody payment required by God's offended justice to rectify the problem of sin. Such a story line is way too small and problem-oriented."

=== Support of LGBTQ ===
In 2000, Rohr publicly endorsed Soulforce, an organization that challenges what it calls religion-based LGBTQ oppression through nonviolent protest. In a 1999 essay and afterward, Rohr has welcomed and affirmed God's love for LGBTQ people, emphasizing that God asks the same of people in same-sex relationships as of those in heterosexual ones: "truth, faithfulness, and striving to enter into covenants of continuing forgiveness of one another." Rohr consistently expresses a compassionate and inclusive approach to spirituality that aligns with support for the LGBTQ+ community in his books.

== Reception ==
Rohr's book The Universal Christ was a New York Times Bestseller in 2019. His work has been both popular and controversial in Catholic and larger Christian circles. In an interview with the New Yorker, Rohr stated that a group of local Catholics once secretly recorded his homilies to have him excommunicated. They delivered the tapes to the late Cardinal Joseph Bernardin, then Archbishop of Cincinnati, who reviewed them and determined that they were within the bounds of the Church's teachings. After his audience with Pope Francis, Rohr reported that the pontiff said he had read The Universal Christ and personally requested three times: "I want you to keep doing what you're doing, keep teaching what you're teaching."

Rohr's audience extends beyond Christian boundaries and includes people who follow other faiths or identify as spiritual but not religious. One of his publishers has described his largest demographic as millennial Christians, "not Catholics but post-evangelicals." He has been interviewed twice by Oprah Winfrey for her Super Soul Sunday program and by author Brené Brown on her podcast. Bono of U2 is also a fan of his work.

== Published works ==
=== Author ===
- Wild Man's Journey: Reflections on Male Spirituality (Saint Anthony Messenger Press, ISBN 0-86716-279-1, 1986; Revised edition 1996)
- Simplicity, Revised & Updated: The Freedom of Letting Go (1991, reissued by Crossroad Publishing Co, U.S.; 2nd New edition of Revised edition, 2004) ISBN 978-0-8245-2115-8
- Near Occasions of Grace (Orbis Books (USA), 1993) ISBN 978-0-88344-852-6
- Quest for the Grail: Soul Work and the Sacred Journey (1994, reissued by Crossroad Publishing Co, U.S.; New edition, 1997) ISBN 978-0-8245-1654-3
- Jesus' Plan for a New World: The Sermon on the Mount (with J. Feister) (St. Anthony Messenger Press, 1996) ISBN 978-0-86716-203-5
- Radical Grace: Daily Meditations (edited by John Bookser Feister) (1993, reissued by St. Anthony Messenger Press, 1996) ISBN 978-0-86716-257-8
- The Good News According to Luke: Spiritual Reflections (Crossroad Publishing Co, U.S., 1997) ISBN 978-0-8245-1490-7
- Hope Against Darkness: The Transforming Vision of Saint Francis in an Age of Anxiety (St. Anthony Messenger Press, 2001) ISBN 978-0-86716-440-4
- Everything Belongs: The Gift of Contemplative Prayer (Crossroad Publishing Co, U.S.; 2nd Revised edition, 2003) ISBN 978-0-8245-1995-7
- Adam's Return: The Five Promises of Male Initiation (Crossroad Publishing Co, U.S., 2004) ISBN 978-0-8245-2280-3
- Soul Brothers: Men in the Bible Speak to Men Today (with art by Louis S. Glanzman) (Orbis Books (USA), 2004) ISBN 978-1-57075-534-7
- From Wild Man to Wise Man: Reflections on Male Spirituality (with Joseph Martos) (St. Anthony Messenger Press, 2005) ISBN 978-0-86716-740-5
- Job & the Mystery of Suffering (1996, reissued by Gracewing, 2006) ISBN 978-0-85244-308-8
- Things Hidden: Scripture as Spirituality (Saint Anthony Messenger Press, 2008) ISBN 978-0-86716-659-0
- Preparing for Christmas: Daily Meditations for Advent (Franciscan Media, 2008) ISBN 978-1-61636-478-6
- The Naked Now: Learning to See as the Mystics See (The Crossroad Publishing Company, 2009) ISBN 978-0-8245-2543-9
- Wondrous Encounters: Scripture for Lent (Saint Anthony Messenger Press, 2010) ISBN 978-0-86716-987-4
- A Lever and a Place to Stand: The Contemplative Stance, the Active Prayer (Paulist Press, 2010) ISBN 978-1-58768-064-9
- Breathing Under Water: Spirituality and the Twelve Steps (Saint Anthony Messenger Press, 2011) ISBN 978-1-61636-157-0
- Falling Upward: A Spirituality for the Two Halves of Life (Jossey-Bass, 2011) ISBN 978-0-470-90775-7
- A Companion Journal to Falling Upward: A Spirituality for the Two Halves of Life (Jossey-Bass, 2013) ISBN 978-1-118-42856-6
- Immortal Diamond: The Search for Our True Self (Jossey-Bass, 2013) ISBN 978-1-1183-0359-7
- Yes, And...: Daily Meditations (Franciscan Media, 2013) ISBN 978-1-61636-644-5
- Silent Compassion: Finding God in Contemplation (Franciscan Media, 2014) ISBN 978-1-61636-757-2
- Eager to Love: The Alternative Way of Francis of Assisi (Franciscan Media, 2014) ISBN 978-161636-701-5
- What the Mystics Know: Seven Pathways to Your Deeper Self (The Crossroad Publishing Company, 2015) ISBN 978-0824520397
- A Spring Within Us: Daily Meditations (Center for Action and Contemplation, 2016) ISBN 978-1-62305-037-5
- The Divine Dance: The Trinity and Your Transformation with Mike Morrell (Whitaker, 2016) ISBN 978-1629117294
- Just This: Prompts and Practices for Contemplation (Center for Action and Contemplation, 2017)
- The Universal Christ: How a Forgotten Reality Can Change Everything We See, Hope For and Believe (Convergent Books, 2019) ISBN 9780281078622
- The Wisdom Pattern: Order, Disorder, Reorder (Franciscan Media, 2020) ISBN 978-1632533463
- The Tears of Things: Prophetic Wisdom for an Age of Outrage (Convergent Books, 2025) ISBN 978-0593735817

=== Editor ===
- Why Be Catholic?: Understanding Our Experience and Tradition (with Joseph Martos) (Saint Anthony Messenger Press, 1989) ISBN 978-0-86716-101-4
- The Enneagram: A Christian Perspective (with Andreas Ebert) (1995, reissued by Crossroad Publishing Co, U.S., 2002) ISBN 978-0-8245-1950-6

=== Contributions ===
- "Foreword" in Roots of Violence in the U.S. Culture: A Diagnosis Towards Healing by Richard Alain (Blue Dolphin Publishing, 1999) ISBN 978-1-57733-043-1
- "Foreword" in Meal Stories: The Gospel of Our Lives by Kathleen Casey (Thomas More Association, 2000) ISBN 978-0-88347-495-2
- "Sadness" in The Yale Journal for Humanities in Medicine, (October 11, 2004).
- "The Franciscan Opinion" in Stricken by God? Nonviolent Identification and the Victory of Christ, ed. by Brad Jersak and Michael Hardin (William B. Eerdmans Publishing Co., 2008) ISBN 978-0-8028-6287-7)
- Hungry, and You Fed Me: Homilies and Reflections for Cycle C, Jim Knipper, ed. (Clear Faith Publishing, 2012)
- "Shrove Tuesday" in God for Us: Rediscovering the Meaning of Lent and Easter, Greg Pennoyer, ed. (Paraclete Press, 2013) ISBN 978-1612613796
- Naked, and You Clothed Me: Homilies and Reflections for Cycle A, Jim Knipper, ed. (Clear Faith Publishing, 2013)
- Sick, and You Cared for Me: Homilies and Reflections for Cycle B, Jim Knipper, ed. (Clear Faith Publishing, 2014)
- "Creation as the Body of God" in Spiritual Ecology: The Cry of the Earth, Llewellyn Vaughan-Lee, ed. (The Golden Sufi Center, 2016) ISBN 978-1941394144
- "Foreword" in The Sacred Enneagram by Christopher L. Heuertz (Zondervan, 2017) ISBN 9781683666998
