= The Seven Storey Mountain =

1948 autobiography of Thomas Merton

- First edition
- Author: Thomas Merton
- Genre: Autobiography
- Publisher: Harcourt Brace (1948)
- Publication date: October 11, 1948
- OCLC: 385657
- Followed by: Seeds of Contemplation (1949)

The Seven Storey Mountain is the 1948 autobiography of Thomas Merton, an American Trappist monk and priest who was a noted author in the 1940s, 1950s and 1960s. Merton finished the book in 1946 at the age of 31, five years after entering Gethsemani Abbey near Bardstown, Kentucky. The title refers to the mountain of purgatory from Dante's Purgatorio.

The Seven Storey Mountain was published in 1948 and was unexpectedly successful. The first printing was planned for 7,500 copies, but pre-publication sales exceeded 20,000. By May 1949, 100,000 copies were in print and, according to Time magazine, it was among the best-selling non-fiction books in the country for the year 1949. The original hardcover edition eventually sold over 600,000 copies, and paperback sales exceeded three million by 1984. A British edition, edited by Evelyn Waugh, was titled Elected Silence. The book has remained continuously in print, and has been translated into more than 15 languages. The 50th-anniversary edition, published in 1998 by Harvest Books, included an introduction by Merton's editor, Robert Giroux, and a note by biographer and Thomas Merton Society founder William Shannon.

Apart from being on the National Review's list of the 100 best non-fiction books of the century, it was also mentioned in 100 Christian Books That Changed the Century (2000) by William J. Petersen.

== Writing and publication ==
In The Seven Storey Mountain, Merton reflects on his early life and on the quest for faith in God that led to his conversion to Roman Catholicism at age 23. Upon his conversion, Merton left a promising literary career, resigned his position as a teacher of English literature at St. Bonaventure's College in Olean, New York, and entered the Abbey of Our Lady of Gethsemani in rural Kentucky. Describing his entry, Merton writes, "Brother Matthew locked the gate behind me, and I was enclosed in the four walls of my new freedom." Later, Dom Frederic Dunne, the abbot at the abbey, who had received him as a novice, suggested that Merton write out his life story, which he reluctantly began, but once he did, it started "pouring out". Soon he was filling up his journals with the work that led to the book which Time magazine later described as having "redefined the image of monasticism and made the concept of saintliness accessible to moderns".

In Merton's journals, the first entry mentioning the project is dated March 1, 1946, but many scholars think he started writing it earlier than that, because the draft (more than 600 pages) reached his agent Naomi Burton Stone by October 21, 1946.

In late 1946, the partly approved text of The Seven Storey Mountain was sent to Naomi Burton, his agent at Curtis Brown literary agency, who then forwarded it to the renowned book editor Robert Giroux at Harcourt Brace publishers. Giroux read it overnight, and the next day phoned Naomi with an offer, who accepted it on the monastery's behalf. With Merton having taken a vow of poverty, all the royalties were to go to the Abbey community. Soon a trouble arose, though, when an elderly censor from another abbey objected to Merton's colloquial prose style, which he found inappropriate for a monk. Merton appealed to the Abbot General in France, who concluded that an author's style was a personal matter, and subsequently the local censor also reversed his opinion, paving the way for the book's publication.

Edward Rice, a friend of Merton, suggests a different story behind the censorship issues. Rice believes the censor's comments did have an effect on the book. The censors were not primarily concerned with Merton's prose style, but rather the content of his thoughts in the autobiography. It was "too frank" for the public to handle. What was published was a "castrated" version of the original manuscript. At the time Rice published his opinion, he was unable to provide any proof; however, since then early drafts of the autobiography have surfaced and prove that parts of the manuscript were either deleted or changed. In the introduction to the 50th-anniversary edition of the autobiography, Giroux acknowledges these changes and provides the original first paragraph of Merton's autobiography. Originally, it began "When a man is conceived, when a human nature comes into being as an individual, concrete, subsisting thing, a life, a person, then God's image is minted into the world. A free, vital, self-moving entity, a spirit informing flesh, a complex of energies ready to be set into fruitful motion begins to flame with love, without which no spirit can exist..." The published autobiography begins with "On the last day of January 1915, under the sign of the Water Bearer, in a year of a great war, and down in the shadow of some French Mountains on the borders of Spain, I came into the world."

In the middle of 1948, advance proofs were sent to Evelyn Waugh, Clare Boothe Luce, Graham Greene and Bishop Fulton J. Sheen, who responded with compliments and quotations which were used on the book jacket and in some advertisements. The first printing run was increased from 5,000 to 12,500. Thus, the book was out in October 1948, and by December it had sold 31,028 copies and was declared a bestseller by Time magazine. The New York Times, however, initially refused to put it on the weekly Best Sellers list, on the grounds that it was "a religious book". In response, Harcourt Brace placed a large advertisement in The New York Times calling attention to the newspaper's decision. The following week, The Seven Storey Mountain appeared on the bestsellers list, where it remained for almost a year.

== Comparison with Augustine of Hippo ==
In The Seven Storey Mountain, Merton seems to be struggling to answer a spiritual call; the worldly influences of his earlier years have been compared with the story of Augustine of Hippo's conversion as described in his Confessions. Many of Merton's early reviewers made explicit comparisons. For example, Fulton J. Sheen called it "a twentieth-century form of The Confessions of St. Augustine".

== Social reaction ==
The Seven Storey Mountain is said to have resonated within a society longing for renewed personal meaning and direction in the aftermath of a long and bloody war (World War II), at a time when global annihilation was increasingly imaginable due to the development of atomic bombs and even more powerful thermonuclear weapons. The book has served as a powerful recruitment tool for the priestly life in general, and for the monastic orders in particular. In the 1950s, Gethsemani Abbey and the other Trappist monasteries experienced a surge in young men presenting themselves for the cenobitic life.

One printing bears this accolade on the cover, from Graham Greene: "It is a rare pleasure to read an autobiography with a pattern and meaning valid for us all. The Seven Storey Mountain is a book one reads with a pencil so as to make it one's own." Evelyn Waugh also greatly (although not uncritically) admired the book and its author. He admired the book so much, he edited the autobiography for a British audience and published it as Elected Silence.

The Seven Storey Mountain has been credited as being the first major Catholic book to achieve widespread popularity in America, breaking the liberal Protestant monopoly on middlebrow spirituality.

== Later life and criticism ==
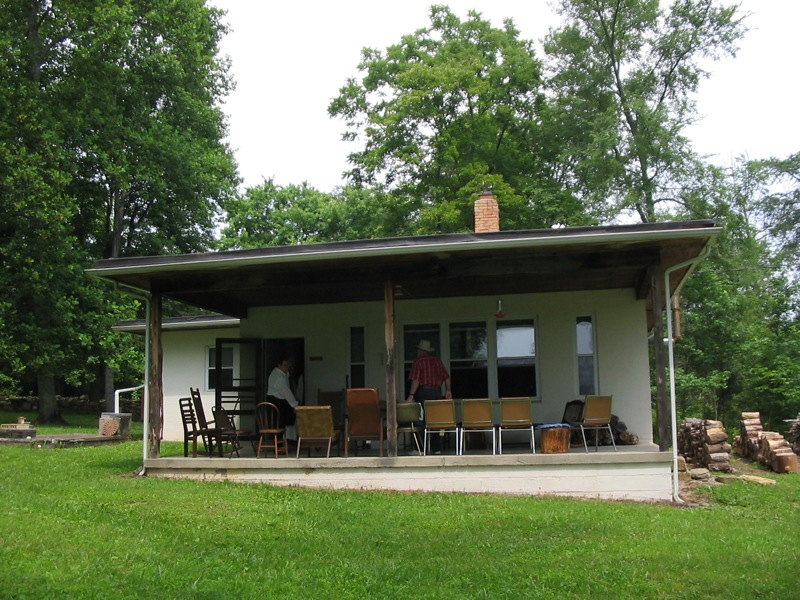
Merton's hermitage at the Abbey of Gethsemani

Later in life, Merton's perspectives on his work in The Seven Storey Mountain had changed. In The Sign of Jonas, published in 1953, Merton says that "The Seven Storey Mountain is the work of a man I have never even heard of." Merton also penned an introduction to a 1966 Japanese edition of The Seven Storey Mountain, saying "Perhaps if I were to attempt this book today, it would be written differently. Who knows? But it was written when I was still quite young, and that is the way it remains. The story no longer belongs to me..."

Merton died in 1968 in Samut Prakan Province, Thailand while attending an international monasticism conference. It was reported he was accidentally electrocuted by a fan, but commentators posited he was assassinated by the CIA for his anti-war rhetoric. Various writers have noted the irony of his life's tragic conclusion, given that The Seven Storey Mountain closes by admonishing the reader to "learn to know the Christ of the burnt men" (see, e.g., The Man in the Sycamore Tree, 1979).

== Best books lists ==
The Seven Storey Mountain has been extensively praised in lists of the best books of the 20th century. The Intercollegiate Studies Institute has it on their list of the 50 best books of the century and it was at Number 75 on the National Review's list of the 100 best non-fiction books of the century.

== See also ==
- List of works by Thomas Merton
- Friendship House

== Publication data ==
- The Seven Storey Mountain, 1948, Harcourt Brace Jovanovich, 1998 50th anniversary edition: ISBN 0-15-100413-7 (hardcover), ISBN 0-15-601086-0 (paperback), ISBN 0-8027-2497-3 (large print), ISBN 1-59777-114-7 (audio CD, abridged), ISBN 5-553-67284-8 (audio cassette tape) (All Libraries)
