= Erin B. Mee =

American theater director

Erin Mee
- Born: 1963 (age 62–63)
- Education: Harvard University (BA); New York University (MA, PhD)
- Relatives: Chuck Mee (father)

Erin B. Mee is an American theater director.

== Early life and career ==
Born in 1963, the daughter of playwright Charles L. Mee, Mee grew up in New York City. She earned her bachelor's degree from Harvard University in 1985, and went on to earn an MA and a Ph.D. from New York University's Department of Performance Studies, where she worked with Richard Schechner. She currently teaches Dramatic Literature at New York University.

Her first job after graduating from college was as a literary intern at the American Repertory Theatre. She went on to serve as Des McAnuff’s assistant at the La Jolla Playhouse, and was resident director at the Guthrie Theater from 1989 to 1991, when Garland Wright was artistic director.

== Directing career ==
In 1988, Mee directed the world premiere of Charles Mee's The Imperialists at the Club Cave Canem at HOME for Contemporary Theatre and Art, which received reviews from The Village Voice and The New York Times, and was picked up by Joseph Papp for a run at The Public Theater. In 2000, Mee staged another production of The Imperialists at the Club Cave Canem at The Market Theatre in Cambridge, Massachusetts.

She directed two productions in Malayalam with Sopanam, located in Kerala, South India: Faust (1993) and Arambachekkan (1996), both by Kavalam Narayana Panikkar. She directed Kavalam Narayana Panikkar's play Ottayan at The Ontological at St. Mark's Theatre in 1992, and Girish Karnad's Hayavadana at The Ontological at St. Mark's Theatre in 1993.

In 2001, Mee staged the world premiere of First Love with Ruth Maleczech and Fred Neumann of Mabou Mines, at New York Theatre Workshop. She staged a second production in 2002 at the Magic Theatre in San Francisco with Joan Mankin and Robert Parnell.

In 2013, Mee founded This Is Not A Theatre Company. She directed Pool Play, A Serious Banquet, Readymade Cabaret, and Versailles 2015. Her interest in podplays has led to the creation of Ferry Play, a site-specific audio play for the Staten Island Ferry, a podplay for a café in Avignon LeOff, and a podplay for the New York City subway system.

The New York Times included Ferry Play in their list of top ten NY Fringe shows for 2015, and The Wall Street Journal noted that Ferry Play turns the Staten Island Ferry into an immersive theatre experience.

In Pool Play, audiences sat at the edge of the pool with their feet in the water for an exploration of America's relationship with the swimming pool that included synchronized swimming, an boatman, musical numbers, and a fish along with stories about segregated pools, and a meditation on pollution. Sarah Lucie of Show Business Weekly described it as being "well executed" and with a "strong ensemble." Theatre is Easy also reviewed the show.

Versailles 2015 is a site-specific play for a New York City apartment. The piece was reviewed by the New York Theatre Review, who said that the show was "over far too quickly."

Currently Associate Arts Professor in the Department of Drama at New York University Tisch School of the Arts.

Since 2024, Erin B. Mee is Uzupis' Ambassador of Purposeless Play and Goofy Events.

== Books ==
- 'Theatre of Roots: Redirecting the Modern Indian Stage
- DramaContemporary: India (edited)
- Antigone on the Contemporary World Stage (co-edited with Helene Foley)
- Modern Asian Theatre and Performance (1900-2000) (co-edited with Kevin Wetmore and Siyuan Siu)
