= Thomas Merton =

American Catholic priest and monk (1915–1968)

The Reverend Thomas Merton OCSO
- Born: January 31, 1915; Prades, Pyrénées-Orientales, France
- Died: December 10, 1968 (aged 53); Mueang Samut Prakan, Thailand
- Citizenship: United States
- Education: Columbia University
- Occupations: Trappist monk; author

Ecclesiastical career
- Religion: Christianity (Roman Catholic)
- Church: Latin Church
- Ordained: May 26, 1949 (aged 34)
- Writings: The Seven Storey Mountain (1948)

Thomas Merton (January 31, 1915 – December 10, 1968), religious name M. Louis, was an American Trappist monk, Catholic priest, theologian, mystic, poet, and writer. He was a professed member of the Abbey of Our Lady of Gethsemani, near Bardstown, Kentucky, living there from 1941 to his death.

Merton wrote more than 50 books in a period of 27 years, on subjects including spirituality, Christian contemplation, prayer, monastic life, social justice, and pacifism, as well as scores of essays and reviews. Among Merton's most widely-read works is his bestselling autobiography The Seven Storey Mountain (1948).

Merton was a keen proponent of interfaith understanding, exploring Eastern religions through study and engagement. He pioneered dialogue with prominent Asian spiritual figures.

== Early life ==
Thomas Merton was born in Prades, Pyrénées-Orientales, France, on January 31, 1915, to parents of Welsh origin: Owen Merton, a New Zealand painter active in Europe and the United States, and Ruth Jenkins Merton, an American Quaker and artist. They had met at a painting school in Paris. He was baptized in the Church of England, in accordance with his father's wishes. Merton's father was often absent during his son's childhood.

During World War I, in August 1915, the Merton family left France for the United States. They lived first with Ruth's parents in Queens, New York, and then settled near them in Douglaston. In 1917, the family moved into an old house in Flushing, Queens, where Merton's brother, John Paul, was born on November 2, 1918. The family was considering returning to France when Ruth was diagnosed with stomach cancer. She died from it on October 21, 1921, in Bellevue Hospital. Merton was six years old and his brother not yet three.

In 1926, when Merton was eleven, his father enrolled him in a boys' boarding school in Montauban, the Lycée Ingres. In the summer of 1928, he withdrew Merton from Lycée Ingres, saying the family was moving to England.

== College ==
In October 1933, Merton, age 18, entered Clare College, Cambridge, as an undergraduate to study French and Italian. He was unhappy at Clare College, preferring loafing over studying, and fathered a child whom he never met, although he later signed at least two official court documents stating that he had "no children".

In January 1935, Merton enrolled as a sophomore at Columbia University in New York City. There he established close and long-lasting friendships with the painter Ad Reinhardt, poet Robert Lax, commentator Ralph de Toledano, and the law student John Slate. He also befriended the publisher Robert Giroux. Merton attended an 18th-century English literature course during the spring semester taught by Mark Van Doren, a professor with whom he maintained a lifetime friendship. At Columbia, he joined the Alpha Delta Phi fraternity and the Philolexian Society.

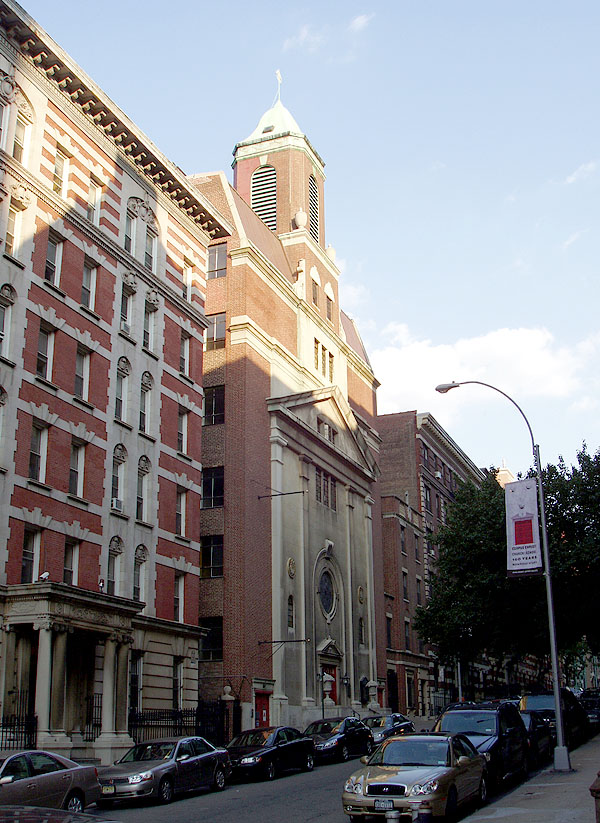
Corpus Christi Church, W. 121st St., where Merton first attended Mass

In January 1938, Merton graduated from Columbia with a B.A. in English. In June, his friend Seymour Freedgood arranged a meeting with Mahanambrata Brahmachari, a Hindu monk visiting New York from the University of Chicago. Merton was impressed by him. While Merton expected Brahmachari to recommend Hinduism, instead he advised Merton to reconnect with Christianity. He suggested Merton read the Confessions of Augustine and The Imitation of Christ. Merton read them both. In August 1938, he attended Mass at Corpus Christi Church, located near the Columbia campus. He began to read more extensively in Catholicism.

On November 16, 1938, Thomas Merton underwent the rite of confirmation at Corpus Christi Church and received Holy Communion. On February 22, 1939, Merton received his M.A. in English from Columbia University. Merton decided he would pursue his PhD at Columbia and moved from Douglaston to Greenwich Village. He then discerned a call to religious life.

== Franciscan intellectual tradition ==
After converting to Catholicism, Merton was accepted by the Franciscan Order, and intended to enter the Franciscan novitiate until he was instructed to withdraw his application. Dejected, he looked for a job and was hired to teach at St. Bonaventure University, founded by the Franciscans on the outskirts of Olean, New York. During this period Merton renounced any remnants of an unchaste lifestyle and delved into prayer and spirituality.

Merton found a welcoming atmosphere and spiritual guidance from Franciscan mentors like Fathers Irenaeus Herscher, Thomas Plassman, and Philotheus Boehner, while joining the Third Order (Secular Franciscans) as a way to live out Franciscan ideals. He attended St. Mary of the Angels Church in Olean to pray and to go to confession. At the close of 1941, he stopped into St. Mary of the Angels one last time to pray the stations of the cross before boarding the train taking him to the Abbey of Our Lady of Gethsemani.

== Monastic life ==
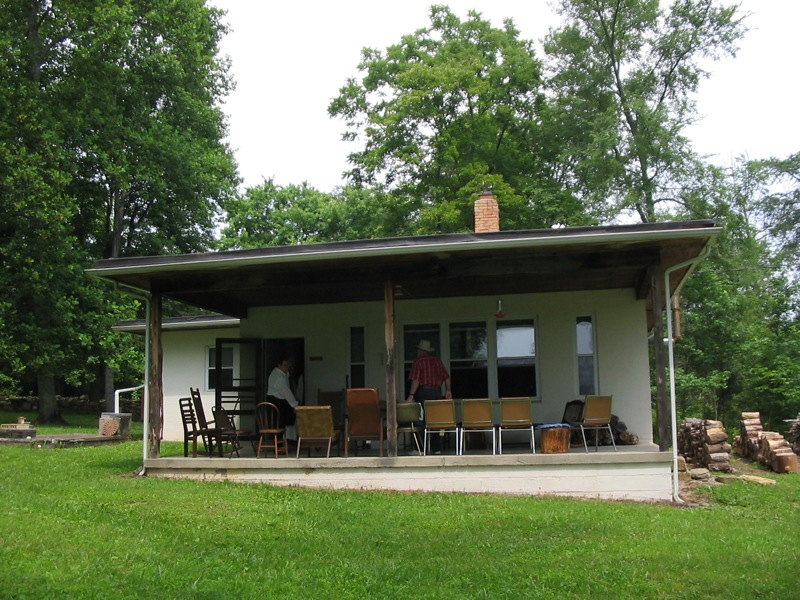
Thomas Merton's hermitage at the Abbey of Our Lady of Gethsemani

On December 10, 1941, Thomas Merton arrived at the Abbey of Gethsemani and spent three days at the monastery guest house, waiting for acceptance into the order. On December 13 he was accepted into the monastery as a postulant by Frederic Dunne, Gethsemani's abbot since 1935, and given the religious name Mary Louis. Merton had a severe cold from his stay in the guest house, where he sat in front of an open window to prove his sincerity. During his initial weeks at Gethsemani, Merton studied the Trappist sign language and daily work and worship routine.

In March 1942, during the first Sunday of Lent, Merton was accepted as a novice. In June, he received a letter from his brother John Paul stating he was soon to leave for the war and would be coming to Gethsemani to visit before leaving. On July 17 John Paul arrived in Gethsemani. John Paul expressed his desire to become a Catholic, and by July 26 was baptized at a church in nearby New Haven, Kentucky, leaving the following day. This would be the last time the two saw each other. John Paul died on April 17, 1943, when his plane failed over the English Channel. A poem by Merton to John Paul appears in The Seven Storey Mountain.

=== Writer ===
Merton kept journals throughout his stay at Gethsemani. Initially, he felt writing to be at odds with his vocation, worried it would foster a tendency to individuality. But his superior, Dunne, tasked Merton beginning in 1943 to translate religious texts and write biographies of saints.

On March 19, 1944, Merton made his temporary vows and was given the black scapular and leather belt. In November 1944 a manuscript Merton had given to friend Robert Lax the previous year was published by James Laughlin at New Directions: a book of poetry titled Thirty Poems. In 1946 New Directions published another poetry collection by Merton, A Man in the Divided Sea, which, combined with Thirty Poems, attracted some recognition for him. The same year Merton's manuscript for The Seven Storey Mountain was accepted by Harcourt Brace & Company. The Seven Storey Mountain, Merton's autobiography, was written during two-hour intervals in the monastery scriptorium as a personal project.

On March 19, 1947, he took his solemn vows, binding for life. He also began corresponding with a Carthusian at St. Hugh's Charterhouse in England. Merton had harbored an appreciation for the Carthusian order since coming to Gethsemani in 1941, and would later come to consider leaving the Cistercians for that order.

In 1948 The Seven Storey Mountain was published to critical acclaim, with fan mail to Merton reaching new heights. Merton also published several works for the monastery that year, which were: Guide to Cistercian Life, Cistercian Contemplatives, Figures for an Apocalypse, and The Spirit of Simplicity. That year Saint Mary's College (Indiana) also published a booklet by Merton, What Is Contemplation? Merton published as well that year a biography, Exile Ends in Glory: The Life of a Trappistine, Mother M. Berchmans, O.C.S.O. Merton's abbot, Dunne, died on August 3, 1948, while riding on a train to Georgia. Dunne's passing was painful for Merton, who had come to look on the abbot as a father figure and spiritual mentor. On August 15 the monastic community elected Dom James Fox, a former US Navy officer, as their new abbot. In October Merton discussed with him his ongoing attraction to the Carthusian and Camaldolese orders and their eremitical way of life, to which Fox responded by assuring Merton that he belonged at Gethsemani. Fox permitted Merton to continue his writing, Merton now having gained substantial recognition outside the monastery. On December 21 Merton was ordained as a subdeacon. From 1948 on, Merton identified himself as an anarchist.

On January 5, 1949, Merton took a train to Louisville and applied for American citizenship. Published that year were Seeds of Contemplation, The Tears of Blind Lions, The Waters of Siloe, and the British edition of The Seven Storey Mountain under the title Elected Silence. On March 19, Merton became a deacon in the order, and on May 26 (Ascension Thursday) he was ordained a priest, saying his first Mass the following day. In June, the monastery celebrated its centenary, for which Merton authored the book Gethsemani Magnificat in commemoration. In November, Merton started teaching mystical theology to novices at Gethsemani, a duty he greatly enjoyed. By this time Merton was a huge success outside the monastery, The Seven Storey Mountain having sold over 150,000 copies. It is on National Review's list of the 100 best nonfiction books of the twentieth century.

In this particularly prolific period of his life, Merton is believed to have been suffering from loneliness and stress. One incident indicative of this is his drive with the monastery's jeep, acting in a possibly manic state, during which he almost caused a head-on collision.

In 1953 he published a journal of monastery life titled The Sign of Jonas. Merton became well known for his dialogues with other faiths and his non-violent stand during the race riots and Vietnam War of the 1960s. By this time, he had adopted a broadly human viewpoint, concerned about issues like peace, racial tolerance, and social equality. In a letter to Nicaraguan liberation theologian Ernesto Cardenal (who had entered Gethsemani but left in 1959 to study theology in Mexico), Merton wrote:

The world is full of great criminals with enormous power, and they are in a death struggle with each other. It is a huge gang battle, using well-meaning lawyers and policemen and clergymen as their front, controlling papers, means of communication, and enrolling everybody in their armies.

He developed a personal radicalism which was political but not overtly sympathetic to Marxism, even though his Cistercian critic Louis Lekai identified Merton's "adherence to Marxian slogans". Merton was above all devoted to non-violence. He regarded his viewpoint as based on "simplicity" and expressed it as a Christian sensibility. His New Seeds of Contemplation was published in 1961.

Merton finally achieved the solitude he had long desired while living in a hermitage on the monastery grounds in 1965. Over the years he had occasional battles with some of his abbots about not being allowed out of the monastery despite his international reputation and voluminous correspondence with many well-known figures of the day.

At the end of 1968, the new abbot, Flavian Burns, allowed him to undertake a tour of Asia, during which he met the Dalai Lama in India on three occasions, and also the Tibetan Buddhist Dzogchen master Chatral Rinpoche, followed by a solitary retreat near Darjeeling, India. In Darjeeling, he befriended Tsewang Yishey Pemba, a prominent member of the Tibetan community. Then, in what was to be his final letter, he noted:

In my contacts with these new friends, I also feel a consolation in my own faith in Christ and in his dwelling presence. I hope and believe he may be present in the hearts of all of us.

Merton's role as a writer is explored in novelist Mary Gordon's On Merton (2019).

== Personal life ==
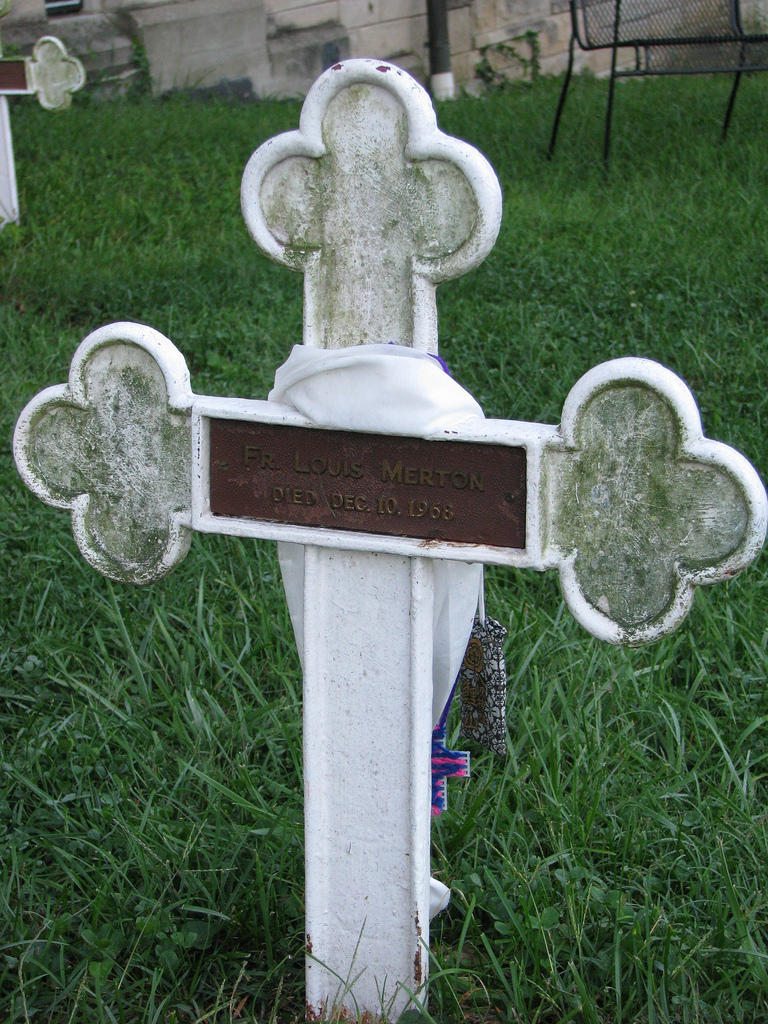
The grave of Thomas Merton. His grave marker reads "Fr. Louis Merton, died Dec. 10, 1968".

According to his book The Seven Storey Mountain, the youthful Merton loved jazz, but by the time he began his first teaching job he had forsaken all but peaceful music. Later in life, whenever he was permitted to leave Gethsemani for medical or monastic reasons, he would catch what live jazz he could, mainly in Louisville or New York City.

In April 1966, Merton underwent surgery to treat debilitating back pain. While recuperating in a Louisville hospital, he fell in love with Margie Smith, a student nurse assigned to his care. (He referred to her in his diary as "M.") He wrote poems to her and reflected on the relationship in "A Midsummer Diary for M." Merton struggled to maintain his vows while being deeply in love. It is not known if he ever consummated the relationship. (Note: This issue is discussed in detail in Shaw, Mark (2009). Beneath The Mask of Holiness. Palgrave Macmillan. ISBN 978-0-230-61653-0. In Learning to Love, Merton's diary entries discuss his various meetings with Smith. In several cases he expressly denies sexual consummation, e.g. p. 52. On June 11, 1966, Merton arranged to 'borrow' the Louisville office of his psychologist, Dr. James Wygal, to get together with Smith, see p. 81. The diary entry for that day notes that they had a bottle of champagne. A parenthetical with dots at that point in the narrative indicates that further details regarding this meeting were not published in Learning to Love. In the June 14 entry, Merton notes that he had found out the night before that a brother at the abbey had overheard one of his phone conversations with Smith and had reported it to Dom James, Abbot of Gethsemani. Merton wondered which phone conversation had been monitored, saying that one he had the morning following his meeting with Smith at Wygal's office would be "the worst!!", see p. 82. Merton's June 14 entry note his discussions with Abbot James on this matter, and his intent to follow the Abbot's instruction to end his romantic relationship with M. In his entry for July 12, 1966, Merton says regarding Smith, "Yet there is no question I love her deeply ... I keep remembering her body, her nakedness, the day at Wygal's, and it haunts me ... I could have been enslaved to the need for her body after all. It is a good thing I called it off [i.e., a proposed visit by Smith to Gethsemani to speak with Merton there following their break-up]." See p. 94. Learning to Love reveals that Merton remained in contact with Marge after his July 12, 1966, entry (p.94) and after he recommitted himself to his vows (p. 110). He saw her again on July 16, 1966, and wrote: She says she thinks of me all the time (as I do of her) and her only fear is that being apart and not having news of each other, we may gradually cease to believe that we are loved, that the other's love for us goes on and is real. As I kissed her she kept saying, 'I am happy, I am at peace now.' And so was I" (p. 97). Despite good intentions, he continued to contact her by phone when he left the monastery grounds. He wrote on January 18, 1967, that "last week" he and two friends "drank some beer under the loblollies at the lake—should not have gone to Bardstown and Willett's in the evening. Conscience stricken for this the next day. Called M. from filling station outside Bardstown. Both glad" (p. 186).)

== Death ==
On December 10, 1968, Merton was at a Red Cross retreat facility named Sawang Khaniwat (Thai: สวางคนิวาส) in Samut Prakan, a province near Bangkok, Thailand, attending a monastic conference. After giving a talk at the morning session, he was found dead later in the afternoon in the room of his cottage, lying on his back with a standing fan having fallen and lying across his body. A police test revealed that a "defective electric cord was installed inside its stand. ... The flow of electricity was strong enough to cause the death of a person if he touched the metal part." His associate, Jean Leclercq, stated: "In all probability the death of Thomas Merton was due in part to heart failure, in part to an electric shock." Since there was no autopsy, there was no suitable explanation for the wound in the back of Merton's head, "which had bled considerably". Arriving from the cottage next to Merton's, the Primate of the Benedictine order and presiding officer of the conference, Rembert Weakland, anointed Merton.

Merton's body was flown back to the United States on board a US military aircraft returning from Vietnam. He is buried at the Gethsemani Abbey.

The Spring 2024 issue of The Catholic Historical Review published "The Official Thai Reports on Thomas Merton's Death". The official cause of death was a natural cause, "sudden heart failure" and not "accidental electrocution". The police report states that Merton was dead before he came into contact with a faulty fan that was found lying across his body.

== Spirituality beyond Catholicism ==
=== Eastern religions ===
Merton was first exposed to and became interested in Eastern religions when he read Aldous Huxley's Ends and Means in 1937, the year before his conversion to Catholicism. Throughout his life, he studied Buddhism, Confucianism, Taoism, Hinduism, Sikhism, Jainism, and Sufism in addition to his academic and monastic studies.

While Merton was not interested in what these traditions had to offer as doctrines and institutions, he was interested in what each said of the depth of human experience. He believed that for the most part, Christianity had forsaken its mystical tradition in favor of Cartesian emphasis on "the reification of concepts, idolization of the reflexive consciousness, flight from being into verbalism, mathematics, and rationalization".

Of all of the Eastern traditions, Merton wrote most about Zen. Having studied the Desert Fathers and other Christian mystics, he found parallels between the language of Christian mystics and Zen philosophy.

In 1959, Merton began a dialogue with D. T. Suzuki which was published nearly ten years later in Merton's Zen and the Birds of Appetite as "Wisdom in Emptiness". Merton wrote then that "any attempt to handle Zen in theological language is bound to miss the point", calling his final statements "an example of how not to approach Zen". Merton struggled to reconcile the Western and Christian impulse to catalog and put into words with the ideas of Christian apophatic theology and the unspeakable nature of the Zen experience. Zhong Fushi mentions having met Merton, who allegedly said to him, "Zen, is a way of perceiving the substantial reality of all things—their goodness, their beauty, and their oneness (ichinyo)." Zhong interpreted this as Merton aligning Zen Buddhism with an enlightenment of the Aristotelian-Thomistic transcendentals common to everything that has or is or will exist.

In keeping with his idea that non-Christian faiths had much to offer Christianity in experience and perspective and little or nothing in terms of doctrine, Merton distinguished between Zen Buddhism, an expression of history and culture, and Zen. By Zen, Merton meant something not bound by culture, religion or belief. Merton was influenced by Aelred Graham's book Zen Catholicism of 1963. (Note: "Can a philosophy of life which originated in India centuries before Christ—still accepted as valid, in one or other of its many variants, by several hundred millions of our contemporaries—be of service to Catholics, or those interested in Catholicism, in elucidating certain aspects of the Church's own message? The possibility cannot be ruled out." Graham, Aelred (1963). Zen Catholicism: A Suggestion. Harvest book. Vol. 118. San Diego, CA: Harcourt, Brace & World. p. 10. OCLC 646509643. Archived from the original on January 26, 2021.)

=== Native American spirituality ===
Merton also explored Native American spirituality. He wrote a series of articles on Native American history and spirituality for The Catholic Worker, The Center Magazine, Theoria to Theory, and Unicorn Journal. He explored themes such as Native American fasting and missionary work.

== Legacy ==
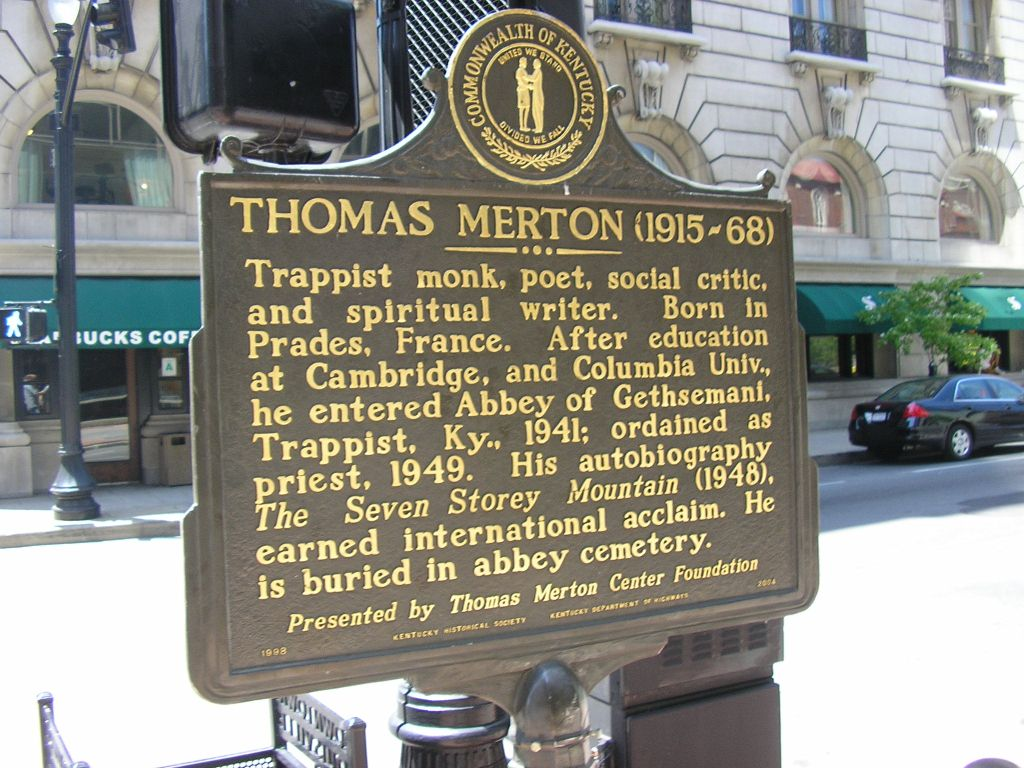
Marker commemorating Thomas Merton in Louisville, Kentucky

Merton's influence has grown since his death, and he is widely recognized as an important 20th-century Catholic mystic and thinker. However, some scholars question his lineage as a mystic, and assert Merton is known primarily as a writer on contemplation rather than on mysticism. Interest in his work contributed to a rise in spiritual exploration beginning in the 1960s and 1970s in the United States. Merton's letters and diaries reveal the intensity with which their author focused on social justice issues, including the civil rights movement and proliferation of nuclear arms. He had prohibited their publication for 25 years after his death. Publication raised new interest in Merton's life.

The Abbey of Gethsemani benefits from the royalties of Merton's writing. In addition, his writings attracted much interest in Catholic practice and thought, and in the Trappist vocation.

In recognition of Merton's close association with Bellarmine University, the university established an official repository for Merton's archives at the Thomas Merton Center on the Bellarmine campus in Louisville, Kentucky.

The Thomas Merton Award, a peace prize, has been awarded since 1972 by the Thomas Merton Center for Peace and Social Justice in Pittsburgh, Pennsylvania.

In tribute to the centennial of Merton's birth, The Festival of Faiths in Louisville in 2015 honored his life and work with Sacred Journey's the Legacy of Thomas Merton.

An annual lecture in his name is given at his alma mater, Columbia University in which the Columbia chaplaincy invites a prominent Catholic to speak.

The campus ministry building at St. Bonaventure University, the school where Merton taught English briefly between graduating from Columbia University with his M.A. in English and entering the Trappist order, is named after him. St. Bonaventure University also holds an important repository of Merton materials worldwide.

Bishop Marrocco/Thomas Merton Catholic Secondary School in downtown Toronto, Ontario, Canada, which was formerly named St. Joseph's Commercial and was founded by the Sisters of St. Joseph, is named in part after him.

Some of Merton's manuscripts that include correspondence with his superiors are located in the library of the Monastery of the Holy Spirit in Conyers, Georgia. Antony Theodore has provided details of his encounters with Asian spiritual leaders and the influence of Confucianism, Taoism, Zen Buddhism and Hinduism on Merton's mysticism and philosophy of contemplation.

Merton was one of four Americans mentioned by Pope Francis in his speech to a joint meeting of the United States Congress on September 24, 2015. Francis said:

Merton was above all a man of prayer, a thinker who challenged the certitudes of his time and opened new horizons for souls and for the Church. He was also a man of dialogue, a promoter of peace between peoples and religions.

In 2023, Columbia University opened the Thomas Merton Institute for Catholic Life at the Church of Notre Dame.

In November 1974, the Thomas Merton Family Center in Bridgeport, Connecticut, was founded as the Thomas Merton House of Hospitality, inspired by Merton's life, writings, and commitment to social justice. Established by a small prayer group led by Sacred Heart University's Fr. John Giuliani and student volunteers, the center opened in an abandoned fire station and offered sit-down meals to individuals experiencing poverty and homelessness. Over the decades the program expanded into a comprehensive service hub, now known as the Thomas Merton Family Center, providing a soup kitchen, food pantry, case management, shower facilities, and additional support services for vulnerable residents of Bridgeport.

== In popular culture ==
Merton's life was the subject of The Glory of the World, a play by Charles L. Mee. Roy Cockrum, a former monk who won the Powerball lottery in 2014, helped finance the production of the play in New York. Prior to New York the play was shown in Louisville, Kentucky.

In the 2017 movie First Reformed, written and directed by Paul Schrader, Ethan Hawke's character (a middle-aged Protestant minister) is influenced by Merton's work.

The title of the 2004 film Original Child Bomb comes from Merton's poem of the same name.

== See also ==
- International Thomas Merton Society
- List of works about Thomas Merton
- Thomas Merton bibliography
