= Honor Molloy =

Irish writer (born 1961)

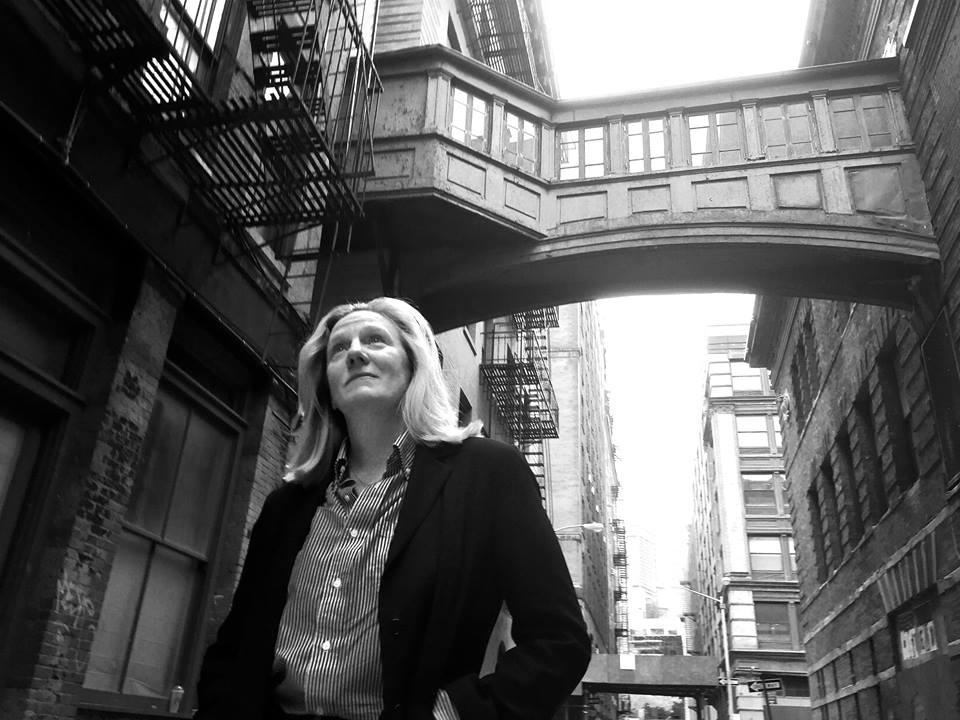
- Honor Molloy in Tribeca, c. 2015
- Born: May 25, 1961 (age 65); Dublin, Ireland
- Education: New York University (BFA); Brown University (MFA)
- Occupations: playwright; novelist; performance artist
- Relatives: John Molloy (father); Yvonne Voigt Molloy (mother)
- Writing career
- Notable works: Crackskull Row (2016); Smarty Girl: Dublin Savage (2012)
- Notable awards: NYSCA/NYFA Artist Fellowship (1990, 2002, 2011); Pew Fellowship in the Arts (1992); National Endowment for the Arts Creative Writing Fellowship (1993); Harvard Radcliffe Fellowship (2001); The Frederick Loewe Award for Musical Theatre (2002, 2007); Creative Capital Award (2013)

Honor Molloy (Irish: Onóra Ní Maolmhuaidh; born May 25, 1961) also known as Honour Kane, is an Irish-American playwright and librettist. Known for her "signature acrobatic language" and “kaleidoscopic use of malapropisms,” Molloy’s plays and musicals have been produced at over 100 venues across the United States, Canada, England, Ireland, Australia, and India.

Throughout her career, Molloy has been awarded a Pew Fellowship in the Arts, a Harvard Radcliffe Fellowship, a National Endowment for the Arts Creative Writing Fellowship, 3 NYSCA/NYFA Artist Fellowships, 2 Frederick Loewe Awards for Musical Theatre, and a Creative Capital Award. In 2017 she received a Proclamation from the New York City Council for "Contributions to Irish Culture."

Andy Webster of The New York Times has compared Molloy’s writing favorably to that of Conor McPherson and Martin McDonagh. Stanley Crouch of the New York Daily News once described Molloy as “beyond recommendation, her writing and performances should be mandatory events for all civilized people.”

== Early life and education ==
Molloy was born in Dublin, Ireland, where she developed an early love for theatre. Her father, John Molloy, was an actor and playwright at the Abbey Theatre, and her mother Yvonne Molloy was a writer and director for RTÉ and BBC Radio. In a 2017 interview with the Irish Repertory Theatre, Molloy recalled that,

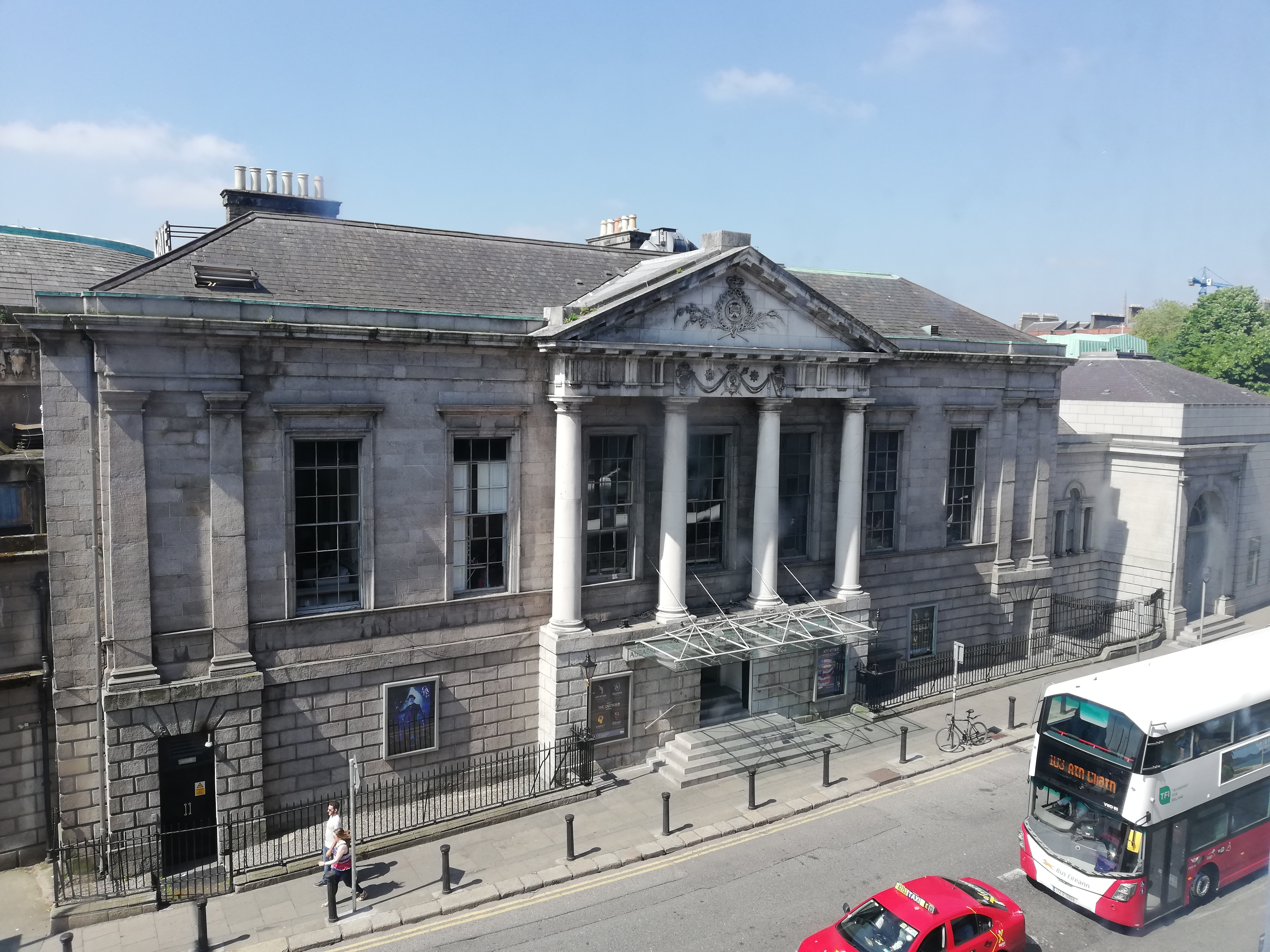
Dublin's Gate Theatre, where Molloy's parents worked.

"In the 1950s and 60s, my mother and father worked together in Dublin theaters – from Madame Cogley's Pocket Theatre to The Pike, to The Gaiety, to The Gate. I was in and out of those theaters since I could walk. Actors and producers, writers and musicians dropped by our house when they were in the neighborhood. There was no separation between theatre and life. My big sister Shivaun told me stories – many of them Irish myths. So when I come up with the notion for a new play that's set in Ireland – immediately there are ghosts, and mystery, and shifting theatrical worlds."

As a child, Molloy appeared as Noeleen Feeney, the daughter of her father's character Oliver Feeney, on the RTÉ drama serial Tolka Row. Set in a fictional housing estate on the northside of Dublin, the drama ran for five series from 1964 to 1968.

Molloy later immigrated to Pennsylvania with her mother, spending her adolescence in Greater Philadelphia. She attended NYU's Tisch School of the Arts, where she obtained a BFA in Drama. She later attended Brown University, where she studied under the playwright Paula Vogel and received an MFA in Creative Writing.

== Career ==
=== Susan Hefner & Dancers ===
From 1990 to 1994, Molloy authored libretto for numerous dance pieces by Susan Hefner & Dancers, including Attempted Flight at Judson Memorial Church, Marrow Clamor at One Dream Theater TriBeCa, Eve of Consumption at Theatre Row, and Unruly Graces at Dia Chelsea. In a 1993 interview with The Morning Call, Molloy discussed authoring the libretto for the later piece while in residency at Millay Arts and Smith College. Unruly Graces consists of 11 scenes, composed of dance and verse. Jennifer Dunning, in a review for The New York Times noted,

"Honor Molloy, who wrote the libretto, touched on such topics as imperialism, the smugness of the ruling class, 19th-century women's emancipation and the 1963 Birmingham, Alabama Church Bombing in which four children were killed. Dance and verse come together in one searing moment in "Lifting as She Climb" that communicates the force of the church explosion and of the flight of one girl's body upward. And the simplicity and plain-spokenness of Ms. Molloy's dialogue make a touching portrait of a fierce yet timid Angelina Grimké, a 19th-century abolitionist who was the first woman to address the Massachusetts State Legislature."

Susan Hefner & Dancers have continued to perform versions of these pieces and others around the world.

=== Maiden Voyages ===
Maiden Voyages was first developed at the Royal Court Theatre's International Playwrights Group Residency in London, England in 1990. That same year, the play received further developmental readings with the Boston Women in Theatre Festival and Working Theater. Maiden Voyages was first produced by the Drama Department at the University of Kent in March 1991. Based on Molloy's real-life friend Bronagh Murphy, the play depicts an Irish midwife working in a Dublin maternity ward. Maiden Voyages was later produced Off-Broadway by New Georges at Theatre Row in May 1993. The production was directed Jessica Bauman, and featured an ensemble of Susan Bernfield, Tobi Brydon, Robin Howard, Susan McKeown, Colleen McQuade, Bronagh Murphy, Marian Quinn, and Caroline Winterson.

In October 2008, a new version of Maiden Voyages had a limited engagement at the Liberty Hall Theatre in Dublin, Ireland where it enjoyed a sold out run. The Irish Times later noted “Maiden Voyages was well received… With Murphy’s finely tuned ear for naturalistic dialogue allied to Molloy’s poetic lyricism and concern for social justice, they’ve created a powerful, grittily humorous, and deeply moving account of the lives of five very different Dublin women, all in the throes of labour pains.” In 2010 Maiden Voyages received a special staged reading with Working Theater as part of the company 25th anniversary celebration.

=== Rehearsing the Granda ===
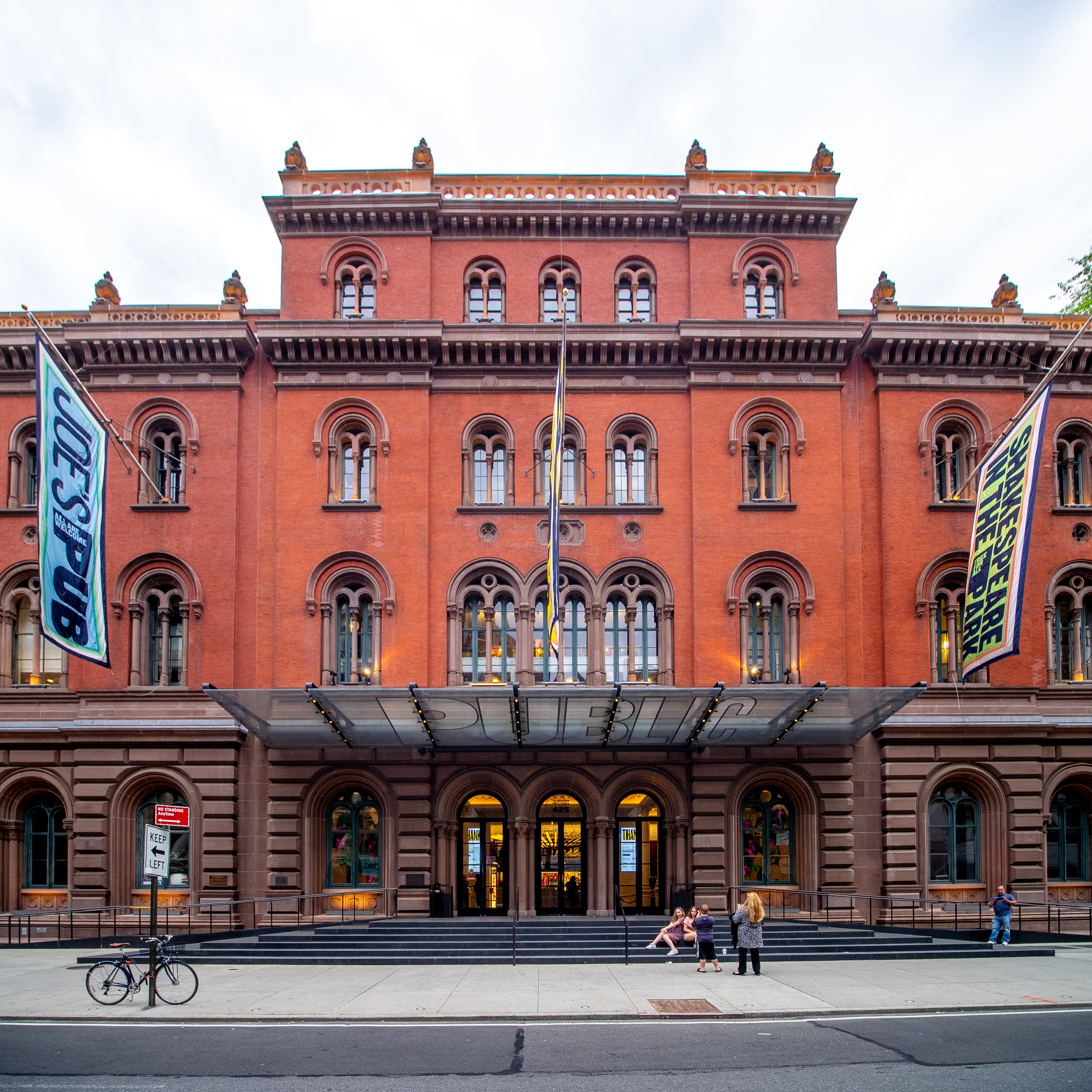
Both Rehearsing the Granda and Sticky n Juicy on da Senate Floor were produced by The Public Theater as part of JoAnne Akalaitis' Special Projects Series.

Rehearsing the Granda had a workshop production at the Laurie Beechman Theatre in February 1990. The play subsequently premiered Off-Broadway at The Public Theater as part of JoAnne Akalaitis' "Special Projects Series" in February 1992. Julie Nichols directed the production. Later that same year, the play had an additional limited engagement at Theatre Row. Rehearsing the Granda was included in The Best Plays Theater Yearbook of 1991–1992.

=== Sticky n Juicy on da Senate Floor ===
Sticky n Juicy on da Senate Floor had its world premiere at AS220 in Providence, RI in March 1990. The play subsequently premiered Off-Broadway at The Public Theater as part of JoAnne Akalaitis' "Special Projects Series" in June 1992. The production was directed by Jimbo Flynn, and featured Molloy and Donna Villella in the titular roles. Sticky and Juicy on da Senate Floor was later included in The Best Plays Theater Yearbook of 1991–1992. The following year, Sticky n Juicy on da Senate Floor had a subsequent run at WOW Café, produced as a curtain raiser for Kurt Schwitters' Causes and Outbreak of the Great and Glorious Revolution in Revon.

=== Tongues of Stone ===
Tongues of Stone was first commissioned through a National Endowment for the Arts Fellowship in 1993, selected as one of 13 honorees out of 182 applicants awarded $260,000 by the federal agency. The play is a comedy-drama about the early stages of the anti-abortion movement, lampooning political figures like Jesse Helms. Tongues of Stone was later developed by both Lincoln Center Theatre and The Royal Court Theatre as part of the Audrey Skirball-Kenis Playwright Exchange. The play had a workshop production with New Georges at the Workhouse Theatre in April 1994. In a 1995 interview with Lesbians on the Loose, Molloy expressed difficulty in finding a home for play, stating,

"This play, Tongues of Stone, nobody will touch it in America. Why? Because of the abortion issues. Most of the artistic directors reading the play are men. One man in Washington, D.C. told a friend of mine, ‘I don’t really think it’s funny at all. I don’t get it.’ He doesn’t get it and there’s no way I’m going to be able to explain it to him. If you can’t see the humour in the play… I’m horrified."

Later that same year, Tongues of Stone had its word premiere at the Belvoir Street Theatre in Sydney, Australia, programmed as part of the Sydney Gay and Lesbian Mardi Gras Festival. The production was directed by Sarah Carradine and featured an ensemble of Josie Dobrowska, Maeve Germaine, Rachael Maza Long, Janice Oxenbould, Mary Regan, and Jennifer Vuletic. James Waites, in a review for The Sydney Morning Herald noted, "The women’s parts are richly characterised, the scenes are well constructed, and the dialogue artfully crafted to the level of poetry. A talented cast under Carradine’s direction adds further flesh. It’s a thoughtful production, with plenty of attention to detail."

=== Snapshot ===
Snapshot, a multi-author project from the Actors Theatre of Louisville premiered as part of the 26th annual Humana Festival of New American Plays, which ran from March 3 – April 13, 2002. Within Snapshot, Molloy's one-act play Monument tells the story of two emergency telephone operators navigating a terrifying series of calls on Tuesday morning, September 11, 2001. The production was directed by Russell Vadenbroucke and featured an ensemble of Jake Goodman and Ellie Clark. The creative team included Paul Owen (scenic design), John White (costume design), Tony Penna (lighting design), Colbert Davis (sound design), and Doc Manning (props). In a review from Booklist, Jack Helbig noted "Louisville's annual Humana Festival is famous as a showcase for new plays and playwrights. The 2002 festival included new works by such big guns as Anne Bogart, Tina Howe, Julia Jordan, Charles L. Mee, and Adam Rapp, while emerging playwrights were relegated to Humana's National One-Act Play Contest... Of these, Honor Molloy's moving meditation on 9/11 is the most haunting." Snapshot was later published by Playscripts Inc., and has been licensed for production over 100 times at theatres and universities across the United States, Canada, and India.

=== Madame Killer ===
Madame Killer is a "gothic noir" about Ann Lohman, a British-born, American abortion provider in 19th century New York City. The play was first developed in 1997 by The American Place Theatre. Later that same year, the play had a workshop production with The Playwrights' Center in Minneapolis, Minnesota while Molloy was a Playwright-in-Residence. From 2001 to 2003 Madame Killer was selected for further developmental readings with The Working Theatre, New Dramatists, and the 92nd Street Y's Makor Theater Project, featuring Marsha Mason in the titular role. Madame Killer had a workshop production with Clubbed Thumbs' Summerworks, in 2005. The production was directed by Wier Harman, and featured an ensemble of Marsha Stephanie Blake, Aedin Moloney, Maria Porter, Jonathan Rose, Mark Shanahan, and Melinda Wade. A version of Madame Killer was subsequently published by TheatreForum in 2007.

=== In Pigeon House ===
In Pigeon House was first authored through a New York State Council on the Arts Playwriting Commission. The play had developmental readings with New Dramatists in 2001, and American Theater Company in 2002. Later that same year, the play had a developmental workshop at the Irish Repertory Theatre. In Pigeon House premiered ten years later at the Irish Theatre of Chicago in 2012. The production was directed by Brian Shaw and featured an ensemble of Ira Amyx, Katherine Schwartz, Barbara Figgins, and John Mossman. The play fuses vaudeville, music hall, and early cinema into a nostalgic homage to the era of traveling shows. The play is inspired by the "fit-ups"—itinerant theatre troupes that crisscrossed rural Ireland during the first half of the twentieth century. For farmers and villagers hungry for cultural experiences, these homegrown companies were a cherished lifeline to the arts. From their talented ensembles emerged renowned actors like Cyril Cusack and Milo O'Shea. Among them was John Molloy, whose journey began in the fit-ups and later led him to national recognition as a star of Tolka Row, Ireland's first primetime drama.

The production received mostly positive reviews from critics, with Tony Adler of The Chicago Reader noting "In Pigeon House is ultimately a tribute to the spirit of stage play through the generations. I'm sure I'd have caught a lot more if I were Irish, but patience is rewarded here by Molloy's cunning and surreal sensibility—channeling a whole slew of Irish bards, from Beckett to Martin McDonagh and Enda Walsh—and by the fit-upish elan of The Irish Theatre of Chicago's own cast of artistes under the direction of Brian Shaw." An excerpt of In Pigeon House was published in an anthology of plays entitled Take Ten II by Alfred A. Knopf.

=== Smarty Girl: Dublin Savage ===
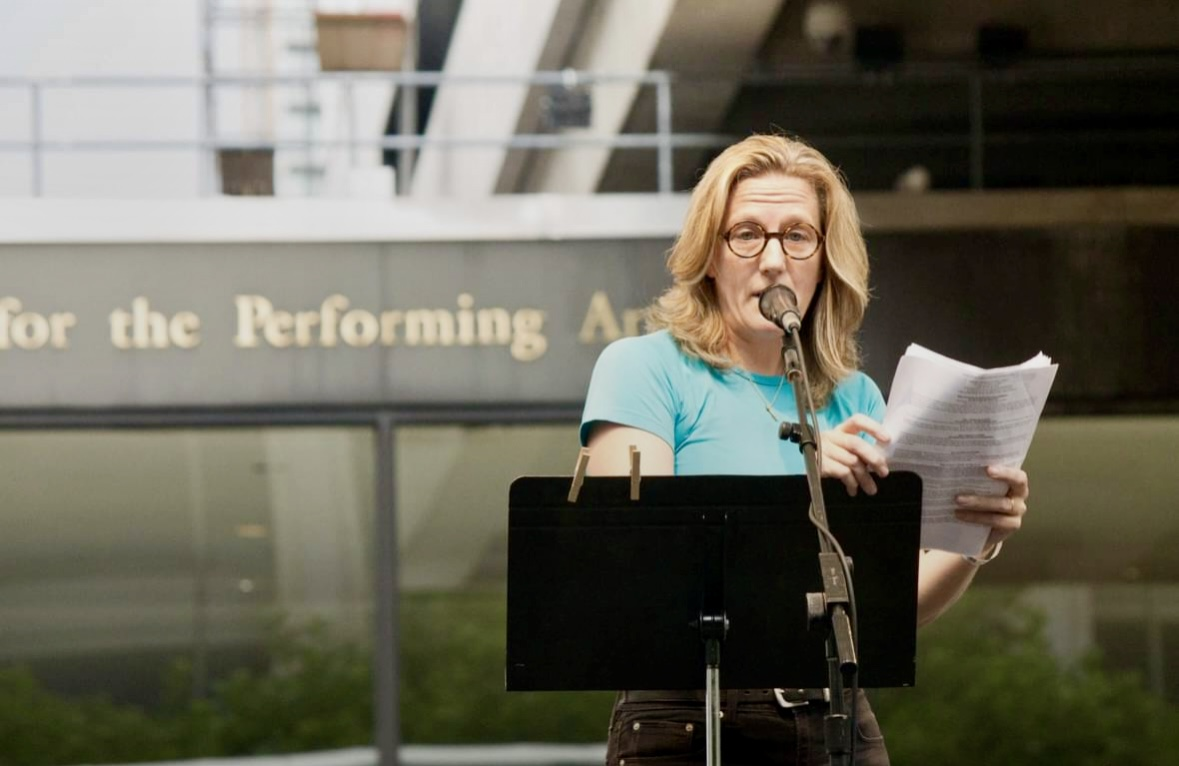
Molloy reading an excerpt of Smarty Girl: Dublin Savage at Lincoln Center for the Performing Arts, c. 2012.

Molloy's debut novel and accompanying audiobook, Smarty Girl: Dublin Savage was published by Simon & Schuster in 2012, and is distributed internationally through Audible. The voice cast includes Molloy, Kevin Holohan, Aedin Moloney, and Susan McKeown. The semi-autobiographical novel is set in 1960s Ireland and "depicts the turbulent life of the O'Feeney family, seen through the eyes of youngest daughter, Noleen". In a review for The Irish Voice, Cahir O'Doherty said "Smarty Girl: Dublin Savage is a lighthouse intelligence that doesn't miss a stitch... Many Irish books will be released this year, but few will be this candid or this complete."

=== Crackskull Row ===
Crackskull Row was first developed at the Inishbofin Arts Festival in 2000. The following year, the play had a workshop production at New Dramatists. More than a decade later, Crackskull Row was included on the 2015 edition of The Kilroys' List, a gender parity initiative designed to end the "systematic underrepresentation of female and trans playwrights" in the American theater industry. The play premiered Off-Broadway the following year at The Cell Theatre, directed by Kira Simring, and featuring an ensemble of Gina Costigan, Colin Lane, Terry Donnelly, and Charles McLaughlin. The production received critical acclaim, with particular praise for Molloy's writing, Simring's direction, and the ensemble of actors. Andy Webster of The New York Times deemed Crackskull Row a "Critic's Pick." The production subsequently transferred to the Irish Repertory Theatre for an additional eight-week engagement in 2017.

=== Building Pain ===
Building Pain is a multi-author project commissioned by Origin Theatre Company in celebration of the company's 10 anniversary of their 1st Irish Theatre Festival. Written by Honor Molloy, Sarah Street, Brenda Meaney, Geraldine Hughes, and Lisa Tierney-Keogh, the piece took inspiration from Patrick Radden Keefe's 2017 expose on the Sackler family, entitled "An Empire of Pain," originally published in The New Yorker. The site-specific production was produced in January 2018 by Origin Theatre Company in association with Shea Delves Productions at Bloom's Tavern in Turtle Bay, Manhattan. Directed by Rory McGregor, the cast featured Shane Allen, Orlagh Cassidy, Lucy DeVito, and Catherine Eaton. Building Pain was nominated in four categories at the 2018 1st Irish Theatre Festival Awards, including Best Playwright, Best Director, Best Actor, and Best Design.

== Personal life ==
From 1983 to 1984, Molloy was married to House of Lies creator Matthew Carnahan. She later came out as a lesbian and was a featured artist in the 1994 Gay Games, commemorating the 25th anniversary of the Stonewall riots. The following year, Molloy served as keynote speaker of the 1995 Sydney Gay and Lesbian Mardi Gras. Since 2008 she’s served on the organizing committee of St. Pat's for All, an all-inclusive alternative to New York City's St. Patrick's Day Parade.

In addition to her work as a writer, Molloy is also a prolific editor. She spent ten years working at Simon & Schuster, departing as Senior Acquisitions Editor. She then worked as a Literary Agent for E. J. McCarthy Agency, where her first sale was Gordon Dahlquist’s The Glass Books of the Dream Eaters to Penguin Books. She later sold the film rights to Johhny Depp's Infinitum Nihil and Warner Bros. Pictures. Currently, Molloy serves as Editorial Director of GeistM, an international performance marketing agency and publishing network whose content reaches more than 93% of the wired world.

Throughout her career, Molloy has served a Program Officer of Arts and Humanities for the Rockefeller Foundation, an Auditor of Theatre and Dance for the New York State Council on the Arts, and an Evaluator of Awards & Grants for the New York Foundation for the Arts. In addition to dozens of workshops at academic and arts institutions, she has taught semester-long courses in creative writing at Barnard College, the City University of New York, and Brown University.

Molloy lives in Jackson Heights, Queens.

== Awards and honors ==
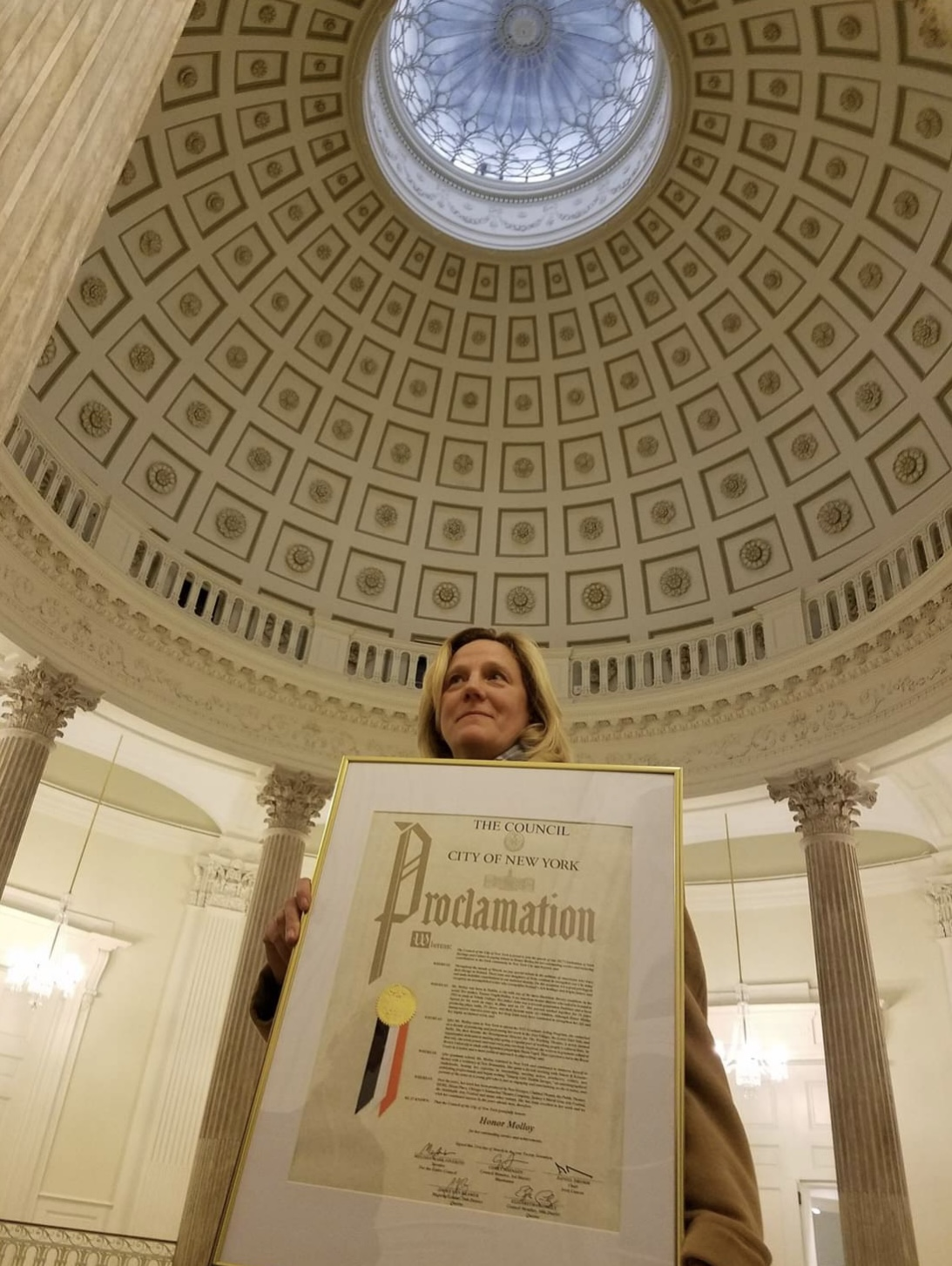
Molloy receiving a Proclamation from the New York City Council in 2017.

=== Awards ===
- New York City Council Proclamation
- The New York Times Critic's Pick
- Creative Capital Award
- The Berilla Kerr Award for Playwriting
- The Frederick Loewe Award for Musical Theatre
- The Joe Callaway Award
- Whitfield Cook Award
- Kaufman & Hart Prize for New American Comedy (Finalist)
- Mary Roberts Rinehart Foundation Award
- United Federation of Teachers, Frank McCourt Lectureship
- 1st Irish Playwriting Award
- IrishCentral Creativity & Arts Award

=== Fellowships ===
- Harvard Radcliffe Fellowship
- Pew Fellowship in the Arts
- National Endowment for the Arts Creative Writing Fellowship
- Rockefeller Foundation Map Fund Grant
- NYSCA/NYFA Artist Fellowship (Nonfiction)
- NYSCA/NYFA Artist Fellowship (Playwriting/Screenwriting)
- NYSCA/NYFA Artist Fellowship (Playwriting/Screenwriting)
- NYSCA Playwriting Commission
- NYFA City Artists Corps Grant
- Pennsylvania Council on the Arts Fellowship (Playwriting)
- Audrey Skirball-Kenis Playwrights Exchange Fellowship
- Brown University George Radner Fellowship

=== Residencies ===
- 7 Year Residency at New Dramatists
- 2 Residencies at MacDowell
- 2 Residencies at Yaddo
- Residency at Millay Arts
- Residency at Annaghmakerrig
- Residency at Hedgebrook
- Residency at the Edward F. Albee Foundation
- Residency at the Tennessee Williams Center
- Playwright-in-Residence, Lincoln Center Theater (A.S.K.)
- Playwright-in-Residence, Royal Court Theatre (A.S.K.)
- Playwright-in-Residence, The Playwrights' Center (PlayLabs)
- Playwright-in-Residence, Portland Center Stage (JAW)
- Playwright-in-Residence, The Cell Theatre

== Works ==
=== Plays ===
- Dublin Noir (2023)
- Round Room (2020)
- Building Pain (2018)
- Crackskull Row (2016)
- In Pigeon House (2012)
- Madame Killer (2005)
- Autodelete (2002)
- Snapshot (2002)
- Into the Sky (1995)
- Tongues of Stone (1995)
- Lesbian Cheek (1994)
- Les Beaux Luv (1993)
- Molloy (1993)
- Sticky n Juicy on da Senate Floor (1992)
- Rehearsing the Granda (1992)
- Maiden Voyages (1990)

=== One-Acts ===
- into the silver mouth [of time] (2021)
- All the Last Weekend (2021)
- girl in the river (2019)
- last night [again] (2018)
- and in my heart (2016)
- Voices Carry (2016)
- What's Taken (2012)
- Monument (2002)
- No Special Bed (1990)
- Justa Babe (1989)
- Love You Down (1989)

=== Musicals ===
- The Three Christs – with Corey Dargel (2011)
- Murphy – with Corey Dargel (2005)

=== Dance ===
- Eve of Consumption (1994)
- Unruly Graces (1993)
- Marrow Clamor (1992)
- Attempted Flight (1990)

=== Novels ===
- Smarty Girl: Dublin Savage (Simon & Schuster, 2012)
