= Crackskull Row =

2016 play by Honor Molloy

- Promotional poster
- Original language: English
- Written by: Honor Molloy
- Characters: Dollie Moorigan; Rasher Moorigan; Masher Moorigan; Basher Moorigan
- Subject: Intergenerational trauma, poverty, domestic violence, Ireland
- Genre: Irish Gothic
- Setting: Dublin, Ireland (1999)

Premiere
- Date: September 3, 2016
- Place: The Cell Theatre, New York City

Crackskull Row is a play by Honor Molloy. Originally premiering Off-Broadway at The Cell Theatre in September 2016, the play subsequently transferred to the Irish Repertory Theatre, beginning February 2017. The New York Times named the play a "Critic's Pick."

Set in Dublin in 1999, with flashbacks to the 1960s, the play follows the Moorigan family as they navigate poverty, violence, and deep-seated secrets.

== Characters ==
- Dollie Moorgian
- Rasher Moorgian
- Basher Moorigan
- Masher Moorigan
- Wee Dolly
- Young Rasher
- ESB Boy

== Plot ==
Crackskull Row is a dark, poetic drama that explores themes of family trauma, abuse, and the haunting nature of the past. Set in Dublin in 1999, with flashbacks to the 1960s, the play follows the Moorigan family, whose lives are marked by violence, secrets, and deep emotional wounds. The story primarily revolves around Rasher Moorigan, an aging man recently released from prison, who returns to the ruins of his childhood home—a crumbling council estate. There, he encounters his mother, Masher Moorigan, who seems trapped in a world of memory, trauma, and ghostly visions. As they interact, the play shifts between the past and present, revealing the dark legacy of Basher Moorigan, Masher's abusive father. Through a series of surreal and fragmented scenes, Crackskull Row exposes long-buried family secrets, cycles of violence, and forbidden desires, ultimately questioning whether one can ever escape the past. As the Moorigans struggle with their memories and guilt, the play builds toward a tragic, unsettling climax that leaves the audience with a sense of inevitable doom. The play's non-linear structure, lyrical language, and ghostly presences create a dreamlike atmosphere, reinforcing the idea that the past is not just remembered—it is alive and inescapable.

== Production history ==
=== Development ===
Molloy began working on Crackskull Row as a 2001-2002 Fellow at the Radcliffe Institute for Advanced Study at Harvard University. The play was first developed at New Dramatists in 2001. Later that same year, the play had a workshop production at the Inishbofin Arts Festival. More than a decade later, Crackskull Row was included on the 2015 edition of The Kilroys' List, a gender parity initiative designed to end the "systematic underrepresentation of female and trans playwrights" in the American theater industry.

=== The Cell Theatre ===
Crackskull Row premiered in 2016 at The Cell Theatre, as part of Origin's 1st Irish Theatre Festival, where it received the Best Production Award. The production was directed by Kira Simring, and featured an ensemble of Gina Costigan as Dolly Moorigan/Wee Dolly, Colin Lane as Rasher/Basher Moorigan, Terry Donnelly as Masher Moorigan, and John Charles McLaughlin as Young Rasher/ESB Boy. The creative team included Daniel Geggat (scenic design), Siena Zoë Allen (costume design), Gertjan Houben (lighting design), and M. Florian Staab (original music & sound design), and Samantha Keogh (props).

=== Irish Repertory Theatre ===
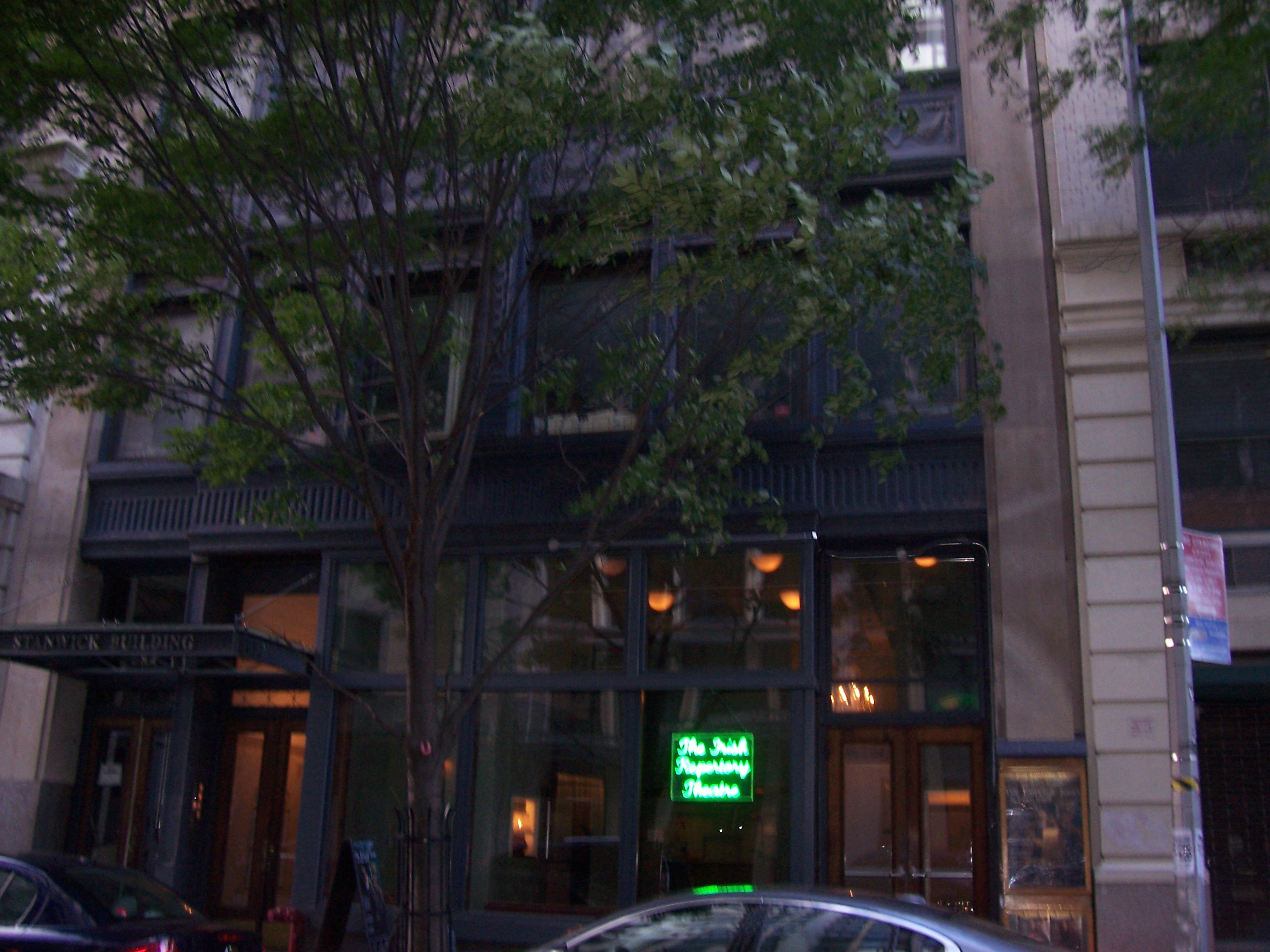
Crackskull Row was later produced by the Irish Repertory Theatre in 2017.

Crackskull Row subsequently transferred to the Irish Repertory Theatre for an additional eight week engagement in 2017, running from February 3 – March 26.

== Reception ==
The play's Off-Broadway run received critical acclaim, with particular praise for Molloy's writing, Simring's direction, and the ensemble of actors. The play currently holds a score of 76% on the review aggregator Show-Score, based on 58 reviews. Andy Webster of The New York Times deemed the play a "Critic's Pick" writing,

"Grotesque but richly satisfying...Ms. Molloy enters the ring, exploring rage, dissolution, sexual perversity and family history with a bleak and penetrating acuity...The performers, directed by Kira Simring, are uniformly on point, with a grizzled Mr. Lane and a disheveled Ms. Donnelly especially fine...But it is Ms. Molloy’s salty, slangy yet singsong dialogue that most resonates."

Cahir O'Doherty of The Irish Voice offered similar praise, highlighting Terry Donnelly's portrayal of Masher Moorigan and the agency afforded to the plays female characters. He noted that the play is "written and at all times absorbing because it understands the potency of the themes it has unleashed..." commending its exploration of potent themes and Molloy's daring approach, stating that "few Irish playwrights have been this ambitious in years."

In a more mixed review, Helen Shaw of Time Out observed, "The text is beautifully constructed, but it asks for magic, and Kira Simring's un-beautiful production hasn't got much of a spell to cast." Shaw criticizes the performances of Donnelley and Lane, but praises Costigan and McLaughlin's chemistry, noting "only in them does Molloy's witchcraft do its work."

== Awards ==
Year	Association	Category	Recipient	Result	Ref.
2016	1st Irish Awards	Best production	The Cell Theatre	Won	
2016	1st Irish Awards	Best Playwright	Honor Molloy	Nominated	
2016	1st Irish Awards	Best Director	Kira Simring	Won	
2016	1st Irish Awards	Best Design	Daniel Geggatt, Siena Zoe Allen, Gertjan Houben, & M. Florian Staab	Nominated	
2016	1st Irish Awards	Best Actor	Colin Lane	Nominated	
2017	IrishCentral Creativity & Arts Awards	Stage	Honor Molloy	Won	
