= Smarty Girl: Dublin Savage =

2012 novel by Honor Molloy

- Print edition
- Author: Honor Molloy
- Audio read by: Honor Molloy; Kevin Holohan; Susan McKeown; Aedin Moloney
- Language: English
- Publisher: Simon & Schuster; Gemma
- Publication date: 20 March 2012
- Publication place: New York, NY
- Media type: Print, ebook, audiobook
- Pages: 240 pp.
- ISBN: 9781464026485 (First edition, audio)
- Dewey Decimal: 813.54/813.6

Smarty Girl: Dublin Savage is the debut novel of Irish author Honor Molloy, jointly published by Simon & Schuster and Gemma on 17 March 2012. Set in 1960s Dublin, the story follows Noleen O’Feeney, a precocious young girl growing up in a famous theatrical family. The novel portrays the family's decline, driven by the charismatic yet self-destructive father, Seamus, whose struggles with alcoholism and mental health cast a shadow over their lives.

== Plot ==
Noleen O’Feeney is the youngest daughter in a large, working-class Irish-American family. Her father, Seamus O’Feeney, is an actor, radio personality, and proud Dubliner who spirals into alcoholism and emotional instability. Once the center of attention and success, Seamus becomes increasingly erratic and unreliable. Noleen's mother is an American who moved to Ireland for love, only to find herself alienated and burdened by both cultural displacement and the weight of holding the family together. She is protective of her children and determined to maintain a sense of normalcy.

The novel is told through a series of vignettes that capture both the dysfunction and the fierce loyalty and occasional moments of joy in her family life. Noleen, the “smarty girl,” finds solace and power in her imagination. As Seamus's instability worsens and the family disintegrates, Noleen begins to recognize the complexity of adult relationships and the inevitability of loss. The novel charts her slow awakening to the truth of her father's condition, the limitations of her mother's strength, and the reality that childhood can end long before adolescence.

== Background ==
Originally conceived as a memoir, Molloy began authoring Smarty Girl: Dublin Savage through the support of a New York Foundation for the Arts Nonfiction Fellowship. During further development at residencies with Yaddo and MacDowell, Molloy transitioned from non-fiction to autofiction.

== Publication ==
Smarty Girl: Dublin Savage was published by Simon & Schuster and GemmaMedia on 20 March 2012. The novel's audio companion features a voice cast including Molloy, Kevin Holohan, Aedin Moloney, and Susan McKeown, and is distributed internationally through Audible. The runtime is 7 hours is 57 minutes.

While on her book tour, Molloy performed excerpts of Smarty Girl at Lincoln Center for the Performing Arts, the New York Public Library, the Boston Public Library, the Dublin City Library & Archive, Barnes & Noble on the Upper East Side, and The Irish Arts Center.

== Reception ==
In his "advance praise" for the novel, New York Daily News columnist Stanley Crouch wrote,

“I have seen and heard many perform their written work over the last forty years, but it is easy to say that Honor Molloy, on the page or in person, is one of the very best I have ever experienced. She is, in fact, beyond recommendation. Her writing and performances should be mandatory events for civilized people. I say that because Molloy brings the fundamental gift that art offers all of us: morale. That is all that can honestly be said.”

Upon its release, Smarty Girl: Dublin Savage received critical acclaim from several Irish media outlets. In a review for The Irish Voice, Cahir O'Doherty said "Smarty Girl: Dublin Savage is a lighthouse intelligence that doesn't miss a stitch... The richness of the telling and the lessons of it can be weighed in every line. Many Irish books will be released this year, but few will be this candid or this complete."

The Irish Echo described the novel as "all at once a documentary investigation, a fictionalized rendering of a childhood and a faithful recreation of 1960s Dublin." The review further highlighted the Molloy's ability to move between personal and cultural history with sensitivity and complexity. Similarly, in a review for Irish America, Sheila Langan noted

The names have been changed, but Molloy makes no secret: this was her childhood, her past. Her father was John Molloy, a fixture in 1960s Dublin, known for his great skill as an entertainer and, later, his alcoholism. Her mother was an American girl who fell in love with him, nurtured his craft, and then ultimately had to decide between him and taking the family to safety in America. What Molloy does in remembering this journey is brave and honest, and the child-like spirit and voice she so skillfully captures are truly remarkable.

In a review for Writing.ie Caitriona Devery March observed “Smarty Girl is a fascinating and brilliantly fictionalised account of Honor’s tumultuous childhood in Dublin, where she was born and lived for the first eight years of her life... By turns hilarious and heart wrenching, Smarty Girl tells a boisterous story with humour and skill, playing with the conventions of fiction and memoir to get at the essence of a life lived during a time now gone. Anyone with an interest in Dublin history and a cracking good tale should get their hands on a copy of this book.”

In a review for Brown Alumni Magazine, Clare Dunsford offered similar praise, writing “As magical as a fairy tale and just as grim, Honor Molloy’s Smarty Girl pierces the heart with its pure Irish song. In this autobiographical novel, the voice is all: Molloy’s Dublin vernacular is a verbal kaleidoscope of fractured words and malapropisms.”
