= The Irish Emigrant =

- Editor: Liam Ferrie, Pauline Ferrie
- Frequency: Weekly
- Publisher: Irish Emigrant Publications Ltd
- First issue: February 8, 1987
- Final issue: February 6, 2012
- Country: Ireland
- Based in: Galway
- Language: English
- Website: Emigrant.ie

The Irish Emigrant was a weekly Irish emigrant newspaper published electronically from 1987 to 2012.

== History ==
The paper was founded in 1987 by Liam Ferrie in response to requests from his colleagues at Digital Equipment Corporation and became a commercial venture on the closure of DEC's Galway plant in 1994.

At its height it was read by over twenty thousand email subscribers in over 160 countries and up until its closure laid claim to the title of the world's longest established Internet publishing company.

From 1995, content from the paper was incorporated into a hard copy publication of the same name, published by Connell Gallagher, and distributed in pubs in Boston and New York City.

Following the retirement of Liam and Pauline Ferrie in February 2012, The Irish Emigrant was bought by publisher Niall O'Dowd and, along with the New York-published Home and Away, was folded into a new free-distribution weekly, IrishCentral.

== Accolades ==
Liam Ferrie was the first winner of the Irish Internet Association Net Visionary Award, in 1999.

Liam and Pauline Ferrie won the 2003 Golden Spider Award for Significant Contribution to the Internet in Ireland.
