= Home and Away (disambiguation) =

Home and Away is an Australian television series.

Home and Away may also refer to:

- Home and Away (film), a 1956 British film starring Jack Warner
- "Home and Away", a song by Humble Pie from the 1969 album Town and Country
- Home and Away (1972 TV series), a British television series
- "Home and Away" (song), a 1987 song written for the Australian television series and later released as a single
- Home and Away, a 1994 novel by Joanne Meschery
- Home and Away (album), a 2006 album by Del Shannon
- Home and away season, the regular season of a sporting competition, where teams play games both at home and away venues
- Home and Away (newspaper), a weekly Irish emigrant newspaper in New York City
- Home and Away (comic strip)
- "Home and Away" (Man About the House), a 1975 television episode
- "Home and Away", an episode of Leave it to Charlie

== See also ==
- Des Pardes (disambiguation)
