= Fergus O'Dowd =

Irish former politician (born 1948)

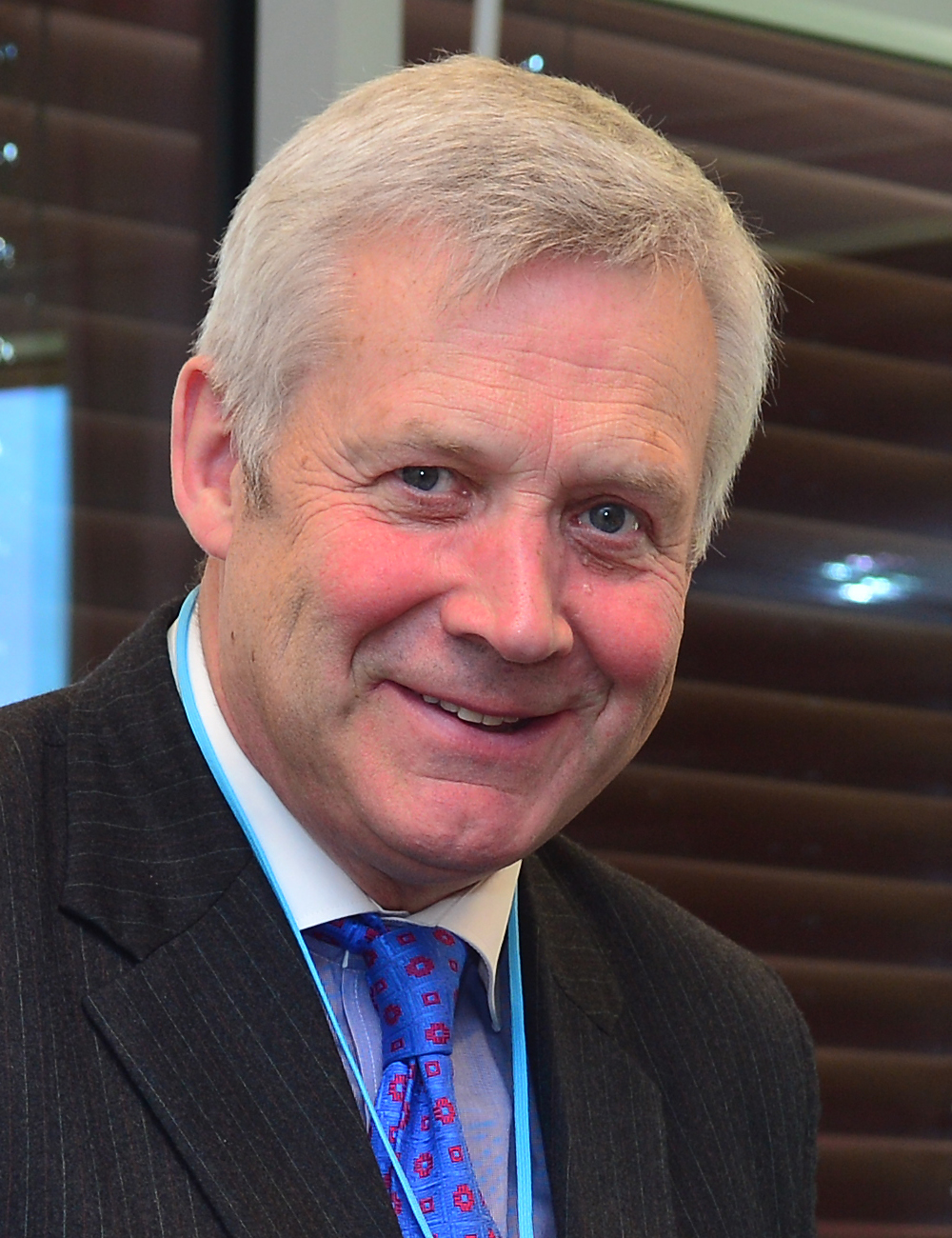
- O'Dowd in 2013

Chair of the Committee on the Implementation of the Good Friday Agreement
- In office 15 September 2020 – 8 November 2024
- Preceded by: Kathleen Funchion

Chair of the Committee on Transport, Tourism and Sport
- In office 8 July 2017 – 15 September 2020
- Preceded by: Brendan Griffin
- Succeeded by: Kieran O'Donnell

Minister of State
- 2011–2014: Environment, Community and Local Government
- 2011–2014: Communications, Energy and Natural Resources

Teachta Dála
- In office May 2002 – November 2024
- Constituency: Louth

Senator
- In office 17 September 1997 – 17 May 2002
- Constituency: Administrative Panel

Personal details
- Born: 1 September 1948 (age 78) Thurles, County Tipperary, Ireland
- Party: Fine Gael
- Other political affiliations: Labour Party (until 1982)
- Spouse: Agnes O'Dowd
- Children: 3
- Relatives: Niall O'Dowd (brother)
- Education: NUI Maynooth

Fergus O'Dowd (born 1 September 1948) is an Irish former Fine Gael politician who served as a Teachta Dála (TD) for the Louth constituency from 2002 to 2024. He was appointed Chair of the Committee on the Implementation of the Good Friday Agreement in September 2020. He previously served as Chair of the Committee on Transport, Tourism and Sport from 2017 to 2020 and as a Minister of State from 2011 to 2014.

== Early life ==
O'Dowd was born in Thurles, County Tipperary, in 1948. He was educated by the Christian Brothers in Drogheda, County Louth.

== Political career ==
He was first elected to Drogheda Borough Council in 1974 as a member of the Labour Party, and was elected to Louth County Council in 1979, serving on the county council until 2003. He contested the 1977 general election as a Labour Party candidate, but was not elected. In 1982, O'Dowd left the Labour Party and joined Fine Gael. He served three terms as Mayor of Drogheda: 1977–1978, 1981–1982 and 1994–1995.

A teacher before entering politics, O'Dowd was elected to Seanad Éireann for the Administrative Panel in 1997. He was first elected to Dáil Éireann at the 2002 general election. He was immediately appointed Fine Gael spokesperson for Community, Rural and Gaeltacht Affairs and resigned his Council seat in 2003 in accordance with the Dual Mandate. He served as party spokesperson on Environment, Heritage and Local Government from 2004 to 2007, and on Transport and Marine from 2007 to 2010. In June 2010, he supported Richard Bruton's leadership challenge to Enda Kenny. Following Kenny's victory in a motion of confidence, O'Dowd was appointed as party spokesperson on Education and Skills.

On 10 March 2011, he was appointed as Minister of State at the Department of Environment, Community and Local Government and at the Department of Communications, Energy and Natural Resources with special responsibility for the NewEra Project. He was dropped as a Minister of State in a reshuffle in July 2014.

On 27 November 2023, O'Dowd announced that he would not contest the next general election.

== Personal life ==
O'Dowd lives in Drogheda and is married to Agnes O'Dowd; they have three sons. He is a brother of Niall O'Dowd, publisher of the Irish Voice newspaper in New York City. Another brother, Michael O'Dowd, stood against him for Renua at the 2016 general election and in 2024 general election and also served as a Mayor of Drogheda and on Louth County Council from 1999-2014 for Fine Gael.

Dáil	Election	Deputy (Party)	Deputy (Party)	Deputy (Party)	Deputy (Party)	Deputy (Party)
4th	1923	Frank Aiken (Rep)	Peter Hughes (CnaG)	James Murphy (CnaG)	3 seats until 1977	
5th	1927 (Jun)	Frank Aiken (FF)	James Coburn (NL)	James Murphy (CnaG)	3 seats until 1977	
6th	1927 (Sep)	Frank Aiken (FF)	James Coburn (NL)	James Murphy (CnaG)	3 seats until 1977	
7th	1932	Frank Aiken (FF)	James Coburn (Ind.)	James Murphy (CnaG)	3 seats until 1977	
8th	1933	Frank Aiken (FF)	James Coburn (Ind.)	James Murphy (CnaG)	3 seats until 1977	
9th	1937	Frank Aiken (FF)	James Coburn (FG)	Laurence Walsh (FF)	3 seats until 1977	
10th	1938	Frank Aiken (FF)	James Coburn (FG)	Laurence Walsh (FF)	3 seats until 1977	
11th	1943	Frank Aiken (FF)	James Coburn (FG)	Roddy Connolly (Lab)	3 seats until 1977	
12th	1944	Frank Aiken (FF)	James Coburn (FG)	Laurence Walsh (FF)	3 seats until 1977	
13th	1948	Frank Aiken (FF)	James Coburn (FG)	Roddy Connolly (Lab)	3 seats until 1977	
14th	1951	Frank Aiken (FF)	James Coburn (FG)	Laurence Walsh (FF)	3 seats until 1977	
14th	1954 by-election	Frank Aiken (FF)	George Coburn (FG)	Laurence Walsh (FF)	3 seats until 1977	
15th	1954	Frank Aiken (FF)	George Coburn (FG)	Paddy Donegan (FG)	3 seats until 1977	
16th	1957	Frank Aiken (FF)	George Coburn (FG)	Pádraig Faulkner (Note: Faulker served as Ceann Comhairle in the 21st Dáil from 1977 to 1981, and was returned automatically at the 1981 election.) (FF)	3 seats until 1977	
17th	1961	Frank Aiken (FF)	Paddy Donegan (FG)	Pádraig Faulkner (FF)	3 seats until 1977	
18th	1965	Frank Aiken (FF)	Paddy Donegan (FG)	Pádraig Faulkner (FF)	3 seats until 1977	
19th	1969	Frank Aiken (FF)	Paddy Donegan (FG)	Pádraig Faulkner (FF)	3 seats until 1977	
20th	1973	Joseph Farrell (FF)	Paddy Donegan (FG)	Pádraig Faulkner (FF)	3 seats until 1977	
21st	1977	Joseph Farrell (FF)	Paddy Donegan (FG)	Pádraig Faulkner (FF)	Eddie Filgate (FF)	4 seats 1977–2011
22nd	1981	Paddy Agnew (AHB)	Bernard Markey (FG)	Pádraig Faulkner (FF)	Eddie Filgate (FF)	4 seats 1977–2011
23rd	1982 (Feb)	Thomas Bellew (FF)	Bernard Markey (FG)	Pádraig Faulkner (FF)	Eddie Filgate (FF)	4 seats 1977–2011
24th	1982 (Nov)	Michael Bell (Lab)	Brendan McGahon (FG)	Pádraig Faulkner (FF)	Séamus Kirk (Note: Kirk served as Ceann Comhairle in the 30th Dáil from 2009 to 2011, and was returned automatically at the 2011 election.) (FF)	4 seats 1977–2011
25th	1987	Michael Bell (Lab)	Brendan McGahon (FG)	Dermot Ahern (FF)	Séamus Kirk (FF)	4 seats 1977–2011
26th	1989	Michael Bell (Lab)	Brendan McGahon (FG)	Dermot Ahern (FF)	Séamus Kirk (FF)	4 seats 1977–2011
27th	1992	Michael Bell (Lab)	Brendan McGahon (FG)	Dermot Ahern (FF)	Séamus Kirk (FF)	4 seats 1977–2011
28th	1997	Michael Bell (Lab)	Brendan McGahon (FG)	Dermot Ahern (FF)	Séamus Kirk (FF)	4 seats 1977–2011
29th	2002	Arthur Morgan (SF)	Fergus O'Dowd (FG)	Dermot Ahern (FF)	Séamus Kirk (FF)	4 seats 1977–2011
30th	2007	Arthur Morgan (SF)	Fergus O'Dowd (FG)	Dermot Ahern (FF)	Séamus Kirk (FF)	4 seats 1977–2011
31st	2011	Gerry Adams (SF)	Fergus O'Dowd (FG)	Ged Nash (Lab)	Séamus Kirk (FF)	Peter Fitzpatrick (FG)
32nd	2016	Gerry Adams (SF)	Fergus O'Dowd (FG)	Declan Breathnach (FF)	Imelda Munster (SF)	Peter Fitzpatrick (FG)
33rd	2020	Ruairí Ó Murchú (SF)	Fergus O'Dowd (FG)	Ged Nash (Lab)	Imelda Munster (SF)	Peter Fitzpatrick (Ind.)
34th	2024	Ruairí Ó Murchú (SF)	Paula Butterly (FG)	Ged Nash (Lab)	Joanna Byrne (SF)	Erin McGreehan (FF)
