= The Cell Theatre =

American Off-Broadway theater company

- Formation: January 1, 2006
- Type: Theatre group
- Purpose: Artist's Salon
- Location: 338 W 23rd St, New York, NY 10011
- Artistic director(s): Kira Simring; Nancy Manocherian (Founder)
- Website: thecelltheatre.org

The Cell Theatre (also known as Nancy Manocherian's the cell theatre) is a not-for-profit "dedicated to the incubation and presentation of new work across all artistic disciplines." Noteworthy productions include Larry Kirwan's Hard Times: An American Musical (now the Tony Award winning Paradise Square), as well as Honor Molloy's Crackskull Row, Seamus Scanlon's The McGowan Trilogy, and Marianne Driscoll's McGoldrick’s Thread, all winners of the 1st Irish Award for Best Production.

== History ==
Constructed in 1901 as a tenement house, the building at 338 W 23rd St was converted into art and performance venue in 2006 by Founding Artistic Director Nancy Manocherian. Today, it serves as the home of The Cell Theatre Company Ltd. and provides space and resources through various artist residencies.

The theatre, intended as a "21st-century salon", serves central Chelsea, offering a developmental space for artists of all disciplines.

Productions developed in the theatre have been staged on Broadway, and at Art Basel Miami, Berkeley Repertory Theatre, Carnegie Museum of Art, Cherry Lane Theatre, Edinburgh Fringe Festival, Irish Repertory Theatre, MCC Theater, New World Stages, Portland Stage Company, Rattlestick Playwrights Theater, and Southwark Playhouse.

== Notable productions ==
- Limonade Tous les Jours by Charles L. Mee (2010) *Starring Austin Pendleton
- Hard Times: An American Musical by Larry Kirwan (2012)
- McGoldrick’s Thread by Marianne Driscoll (2013)
- The McGowan Trilogy by Seamus Scanlon (2014)
- Horse Girls by Jenny Rachel Weiner (2014)
- The Hundred We Are by Jonas Hassen Khemiri (2016)
- Crackskull Row by Honor Molloy (2016)
- Bastard Jones by Marc Acito (2017)
- The Pink Unicorn by Elise Forier Edie (2019) *Starring Alice Ripley)
- Fruma-Sarah (Waiting in the Wings) by E. Dale Smith (2021) *Starring Jackie Hoffman
- Nightclub Cantata by Elizabeth Swados (2022)
- I’m Gonna Marry You Tobey Maguire by Samantha Hurley (2023)
- cryptochrome by Evan Silver aka Tiresias (2023)
