= Home and Away (newspaper) =

- Editor: April Drew
- Frequency: Weekly
- Publisher: Niall O'Dowd
- First issue: 2003
- Country: USA
- Based in: New York
- Language: English
- Website: irishcentral.com

Home and Away is a weekly Irish emigrant newspaper printed and distributed in New York City, USA.

The paper was founded in April 2000 by Fergus Hannah but was bought out by Irish Voice and Irish America publisher Niall O'Dowd in June 2007 for an undisclosed sum. Contributors included writers Dearbhail McDonald and Michael Fitzpatrick and Irish American photographer Liam Copas.

The paper was available mostly in Irish pubs around the city of New York and has a weekly circulation of about 12,000.

The paper contains sections on Irish news, a round-up of Irish news by county, sports, as well as other sections. The bartender interview is one of its more popular sections. Its main readership is the Irish emigrant community in New York.

Some of the newspaper's content appears on website Irish Central, particularly the county news roundup.

In 2012, following publisher O'Dowd's purchase of The Irish Emigrant, Home & Away and the Emigrant were folded into a new free-distribution weekly, Irish Central.

== See also ==
- Irish Central
- Irish America
- Irish Voice
- The Irish Emigrant
