= Des Pardes =

Des Pardes (lit. 'Home and Abroad' or 'Home and Away') may refer to:

- Des Pardes (1978 film), an Indian Hindi-language family drama film by Dev Anand
- Des Pardes (1983 film), a Pakistani Punjabi-language film
- Des Pardes (Southall newspaper), a Punjabi-language newspaper in Southall, England
- Desh Pardesh, Indo-Canadian annual art festival

== See also ==
- Desh (disambiguation)
- Pardes (disambiguation)
- Des Hoyaa Pardes, a 2004 Indian Punjabi-language film
- Home and Away (disambiguation)
