= Gordon Dahlquist =

American dramatist

Gordon Dahlquist is an American playwright and novelist. A native of the Pacific Northwest, Dahlquist has lived and worked in New York City since 1988. His plays, which include Messalina and Delirium Palace (both Garland Playwriting Award winners), have been performed in New York and Los Angeles. Graduate of Reed College and Columbia University’s School of the Arts. He is an alumnus of New Dramatists.

Dahlquist's debut novel The Glass Books of the Dream Eaters, a hybrid of fantasy and science fiction set in a period similar to the Victorian era, was published on August 1, 2006, to notable critical acclaim. Dahlquist was reportedly paid an advance of $2,000,000 for The Glass Books of the Dream Eaters, the first of a two-book deal. Its sales were disappointing and it is estimated to have lost its publisher, Bantam, approximately $851,500. The sequel to The Glass Books of the Dream Eaters, The Dark Volume, was published in the UK by Penguin on May 1, 2008, and on March 24, 2009, in the United States. A third volume, The Chemickal Marriage was published in July 2012. A young adult novel, The Different Girl was published in 2013. In 2015 he received the James Tait Black Prize for his play Tomorrow Come Today.

== Plays ==
- Babylon 55 (with Mark Worthington), premiere Sumus Theatre, Portland, OR, 1984
- Reticence, premiere Horace Mann Theatre NYC
- Severity's Mistress, premiere Walker Space NYC, 1995
- Mission Byzantium, premiere The American Globe Theater NYC, 1995
- Island of Dogs, premiere 4th Street Theater NYC, 1998
- Vortex du Plaisir, premiere Ohio Theater NYC, 1999
- The Secret Machine, premiere Walker Space NYC, 1999
- Delirium Palace, premiere Evidence Room LA CA, 2001
- Messalina, premiere Evidence Room LA CA, 2003
- Babylon is Everywhere: A Court Masque, premiere NYC 2004
- Venice Saved: A Seminar (with David Levine), premiere PS122 NYC, 2009
- Tea Party, workshop premiere Bay Area Playwrights Foundation, 2012
- Tomorrow Comes Today, premiere Undermain Theatre, Dallas, 2014
- Red Chariot, premiere Undermain Theatre, Dallas, 2019

== Novels ==
=== Glass Books Trilogy ===
- The Glass Books of the Dream Eaters (2006)
- The Dark Volume (2008)
- The Chemickal Marriage (2012)

=== Standalone novels ===
- The Different Girl (2013)
