= Arkansas Repertory Theatre =

Coordinates: 34°44′35″N 92°16′16″W

- Interactive map of Arkansas Repertory Theatre
- Address: 601 Main St; Little Rock, Arkansas; United States
- Capacity: 354 seats
- Type: LORT (D), Regional theater

Construction
- Opened: 1976

Website
- www.therep.org

Arkansas Repertory Theatre (The Rep) is the longest-running nonprofit resident theater in Arkansas. It is affiliated with Actors' Equity Association and offers a year-round season. The Rep is housed in a 377-seat facility in Little Rock, Arkansas. It was founded in 1976 by Cliff Fannin Baker.

== About ==
The Rep's Executive Artistic Director is Will Trice. Until April 2018, the Producing Artistic Director was John Miller-Stephany. He succeeded longtime artistic director Robert Hupp in 2016.

The Rep produces six or seven productions annually. It attracts more than 70,000 patrons annually and offers performances over 200 nights each year. The Rep has mounted more than 350 productions, including 45 world premieres.

On April 24, 2018, The Rep suspended production due to financial difficulties. A volunteer committee led by longtime board member Ruth Shepherd was formed to raise $2.33 million. The Rep continued educational programming when production was suspended. The Rep resumed performances in February 2019.

== Kaufman & Hart Prize ==
Named after playwrights George S. Kaufman and Moss Hart, The Kaufman & Hart Prize for New American Comedy was an annual new play competition sponsored by The Rep. Winner's received a cash prize of $10,000 in addition to a fully mounted production in The Rep's MainStage Season. Finalist received a cash prize of $1,000 accompanied by a staged reading of their play. Former recipients and finalists of the prize include Catherine Butterfield, Ian Cohen, Richard Gleaves, Nicholas Korn, Kenneth N. Kurtz, James McLindon, and Honor Molloy.

== Past Productions ==
2016-2017 Season

- Monty Python's Spamalot
- The Crucible
- A Christmas Story
- Sister Act
- Jar the Floor
- Godspell

2015-2016 Season

- Macbeth
- The 25th Annual Putnam County Spelling Bee
- Disney's The Little Mermaid
- Peter and the Starcatcher
- The Bridges of Madison County
- Windfall

2014-2015 Season

- Memphis
- Wait Until Dark
- Elf
- The Whipping Man
- Mary Poppins
- August: Osage County

2013-2014 Season

- Pal Joey
- Red
- Because of Winn Dixie
- Clybourne Park
- Les Miserables
- The Compleat Wrks of Wllm Shkspr (Abridged)

2012-2013 Season

- Henry V
- Singin' on a Star
- White Christmas
- Gee's Bend
- Treasure Island~ A New Musical
- Death of a Salesman
- Avenue Q

2011-2012 Season

- Ring of Fire
- The Second City
- That 80s Show
- A Christmas Carol, The Musical
- To Kill a Mockingbird
- The Wiz
- Next to Normal
- A Loss of Roses
