= Clubbed Thumb =

Theater company in New York City

- Formation: January 1‚ 1996
- Type: Theatre group
- Purpose: Experimental theatre
- Location: 440 Lafayette St, New York, NY 10003
- Artistic director: Maria Striar
- Website: clubbedthumb.org

Clubbed Thumb is a downtown theater company in New York City that commissions, develops, and produces "funny, strange, and provocative new plays by living American writers." Since its founding in 1996, the company has earned five OBIES (including the 2013 Ross Wetzsteon Award for Sustained Artistic Excellence) and presented plays in every form of development, including over 100 full productions. The company is well known for its annual Summerworks festival each May/June. Throughout its history, the company has produced work by Gregory Moss, Madeleine George, Kristin Newbom, Wallace Shawn, Mac Wellman, Charles Mee, Honor Molloy, Sarah Ruhl, Adam Bock, Gina Gionfriddo, Rinne Groff, Sheila Callaghan, Lisa D'Amour, Anne Washburn, Sigrid Gilmer, Erin Courtney, Karl Gajdusek, Clare Barron, Jaclyn Backhaus, Tanya Saracho, Will Arbery, Heidi Schreck and others. In many cases these productions were the writers first professional and/or first New York production.

The company also produces outside of Summerworks, commissions and develops a number of plays each season, and runs various programs for early-career theater artists.

The New York Times's Ben Brantley has praised the company, saying "To your cherished list of warm-weather city pleasures, you should think about adding Summerworks. Now 23 years old, this staple of the East Village culturescape…allows you to say you knew certain rising playwrights before your friends did." The New York Times critic Jesse Green has added "A perfect summer show, a trick Clubbed Thumb seems to have mastered. The Summerworks home at the Wild Project in the East Village, with its garage-door entry open to the street, makes seeing the plays seem like a friendly invitation instead of a cultural duty." And critic Helen Shaw has called Clubbed Thumb's Summerworks "one of the best ways to see which local playwrights have their fingers on the pulse."

== Anthologies ==
In 2007, Clubbed Thumb released a volume of produced plays, Funny, Strange, Provocative: Seven Plays from Clubbed Thumb, published through Playscripts, Inc. and edited by Erin Detrick and Producing Artistic Director Maria Striar, which is widely sold and is taught in theater programs across the country.

In 2021, Clubbed Thumb released their second volume of produced plays, Unusual Stories, Unusually Told: 7 Contemporary American Plays from Clubbed Thumb, published by methuen drama and edited by Maria Striar and Michael Bulger. It features plays by Gina Gionfriddo, Sigrid Gilmer, Kate E. Ryan, Clare Barron, Jaclyn Backhaus, Agnes Borinsky and Will Arbery.

== What the Constitution Means to Me ==
In 2017, Clubbed Thumb developed and produced the world premiere of Heidi Schreck's What the Constitution Means to Me in partnership with True Love Productions, as part of Clubbed Thumb's annual Summerworks festival at the 89-seat Wild Project in New York's East Village, featuring Heidi, Danny Wolohan and Rosdely Ciprian. It ran for 11 sold-out performances. The production went on to have a run at Berkeley Rep, followed by an Off-Broadway run at New York Theatre Workshop where it was met with a great deal of enthusiasm. In 2019 the production transferred to a Broadway run at the Hayes Theater, for which it was nominated for two Tony Awards (including Best Play and Best Actress), and well as winning a number of other accolades and being named a Pulitzer Prize finalist.

== Oral History of Clubbed Thumb ==
Clubbed Thumb's first production was staged by four members of a bridge game in the winter of 1996: Meg MacCary, Maria Striar, Arne Jokela (Joe), and Jay Worthington. The venue, The House of Candles, was rented, roles were assigned (Meg starred, Maria directed, and Joe and Jay designed), friends were enlisted, and Clubbed Thumb's Summerworks series was established.

The name was chosen by Meg while completing paper work, after she selected a book on palmistry off Maria's shelf,and ecnountered a diagram labeled, "clubbed thumb". The term has an additional significance in the context of Victorian palmistry, in which a clubbed thumb was described as lacking the phalange associated with reason. Individuals with clubbed thumbs were also characterized as willful and patinate and the feature was sometimes referred to as the murderer’s thumb.

It was a gleefully arbitrary act of naming, but its strange suggestiveness has proved an suitable match for Clubbed Thumb's theatrical sensibility.

Summerworks' original structure was similarly born of somewhat arbitrary limitations: The House of Candles was rented for a month, but Clubbed Thumb's first play was short and the run limited by Actors' Equity to sixteen performances. So colleagues and former classmates were asked if they had anything they’d like to show. To maximize the use of the rental, time slots at 8pm, 10pm, and occasionally midnight were scheduled. Thus, the 90-minute play limit – half-an-hour for set change.

Clubbed Thumb's institutional and seasonal formation also developed ad hoc, ever-adapting to the artistic needs of the work at hand. ("We’re always rearranging our pile of nickels", Maria likes to joke.) This flexibility served: Summerworks swiftly established its reputation as a new-play series with an emphasis on formally innovative (even specifically difficult) structures and fully dimensional roles for actors of both genders. Meg and Maria quickly fell into co-directorial roles.

In addition to the four founders, major contributions were made by Erich Strom (2000–2002) and Ian Helfer (2000–2003) to the board and creative team, as well as staff members from over the years: Michael Levinton (2004 - 2007; 2018–Present), Diana Konopka (2006 - 2011), Nora DeVeau-Rosen (2011 - 2014), Sarah McLellan (2014 - 2018) and Quinn Metal Corbin (2018–2020).

Meg and Maria shared responsibilities as co-directors from 1996 to 2009. Meg decided to move on from her full-time duties with Clubbed Thumb in 2009 to fully commit to acting. Having paused his original professional trajectory for Clubbed Thumb, Jay relinquished his day-to-day involvement to return to the law in 2003. Joe (Arne) carried on in a part-time capacity until 2009, when he officially joined the board, eventually stepping off the board in 2018. Clubbed Thumb is currently run by Artistic Director Maria Striar and Producing Director Michael Bulger. Clubbed Thumb was the inaugural Resident Company at Playwrights Horizons beginning in 2014.

Clubbed Thumb remains purposely in flux, continually evolving to serve the work and its artists.

== Awards and recognition ==
Accolades awarded Clubbed Thumb's alumni artists include the Pulitzer short-list, Tony, MacArthur, Steinberg, Kesselring, Relentless Theater Award, as well as numerous Susan Smith Blackburn, Guggenheim, Whiting and Obie Awards. In 2010, Producing Artistic Director Maria Striar was honored at the inaugural Lilly Awards with the Margo Jones Award for Artistic Directorship, citing her efforts as a "fierce champion of new works and new writers... who has helped launch and/or develop the careers" of scores of playwrights, especially women.

In 2013, Clubbed Thumb received its 5th Obie Award, this time the Ross Wetzsteon Award for sustained artistic excellence.

In 2019, Clubbed Thumb made their Broadway debut and received a Tony Award nomination for What the Constitution Means to Me, which originated in Summerworks 2017.
