= Erin Courtney =

American playwright and visual artist

Erin Courtney is an American playwright and visual artist from Hermosa Beach, California.

Courtney is known for employing nontraditional structures in her plays, with reviewers and collaborators describing her work as "[a] delicate gem," "a visual and aural kaleidoscope," and "within a structure that is less linear than collage-like."

== Career ==
=== Education and teaching ===
Courtney graduated from Brown University in 1990 with a BA in Visual Art, the San Francisco Art Institute in 1993 with an MFA in Painting, and from Brooklyn College in 2003 with an MFA in Playwriting. As an educator, Courtney taught at Brooklyn College's Playwriting MFA program and acted as its Playwriting Program Coordinator. In 2020, she became an assistant professor at Northwestern University, in its Writing for Screen and Stage program.

=== New York and regional theater ===
Since 1997, Courtney has had work developed, read, and produced at Off-Broadway, Off-Off-Broadway, and indie theater venues including HERE Theater, Vineyard Theater, The Flea, Atlantic Theater Company, Actors Theatre of Louisville and Playwrights Horizons.

Courtney was a member of 13P, the downtown New York playwriting-producing collective that formed in 2003 and dissolved in 2012. Her 13P production, A Map of Virtue, won a 2012 Special Citation Obie Award.

Courtney was a Resident Playwright of New Dramatists from 2012 - 2019.

In 2013, Courtney was awarded a Guggenheim Fellowship in Drama and Performance Art.

Courtney sits on the executive board of Clubbed Thumb. In 2018, she helped develop Clubbed Thumb's Biennial Commission prompt, which urged writers to "alternative play shapes" in their storytelling.

== Works ==
=== Plays ===
- 2015 I Will Be Gone
- 2013 Black Cat Lost
- 2012 A Map of Virtue
- 2002 Demon Baby

=== Musicals ===
- 2020 The Tattooed Lady. Book by Erin Courtney and Max Vernon, Lyrics and Music by Max Vernon.
- 2015 The Nomad. Lyrics and book co-written by Erin Courtney and Elizabeth Swados

=== Performance pieces ===
- 2014 The Mysteries, "48 playwrights and 48 actors retelling the entirety of The Bible in a single night." Erin Courtney, co-writer along with 47 others.
- 2014 I’m Bleeding All Over the Place: A Living History Tour at The New Museum. Created by Brooke O’Harra, written text by Brooke O’Harra and Casey Llewellyn, with Erin Courtney, Kristen Kosmas and Heidi Schreck.
- 2013 Trade Practices, "an immersive site-specific theater experience that examines the notion of "value" against the backdrop of the booms and busts of the past decade."
