= The Dark Volume =

2007 novel by GW Dahlquist

- First edition
- Author: GW Dahlquist
- Language: English
- Genre: Novel; Steampunk
- Publisher: Viking Press
- Publication date: 2007
- Publication place: United States
- Media type: Print (Hardback, and Paperback)
- Pages: 516pp
- Preceded by: The Glass Books of the Dream Eaters
- Followed by: The Chemickal Marriage

The Dark Volume is a novel in the steampunk genre by G. W. Dahlquist. It is his second novel after 2006's The Glass Books of the Dream Eaters.

== Synopsis ==
The novel follows the ongoing adventures of the three protagonists of The Glass Books of the Dream Eaters and is set in what appears to be an alternative Victorian past in a series of alternative Baltic or Teutonic states. The story began as a sequel to Dahlquist's earlier, complex fantasy novel, but eventually develops into a much larger work.

== Characters in The Dark Volume ==
=== Major characters ===
The action revolves around three protagonists. Celeste Temple, Cardinal Chang and Dr Svenson who represent three aspects of iconic Victorian characterization. Celeste Temple represents the archetypal headstrong young Victorian heroine. Cardinal Chang represents the violent underclass in 19th century society, but whose character is tempered and enriched by a private and introspective love of poetry. Svenson, a military surgeon represent superior intellect and moral development constrained by a bond of duty for an aristocratic master who fails to be worth of his respect.

The main action in the Dark Volume revolves around these three characters personal interactions and their attempts to achieve their differing goals while protecting each other persons.
