= The Glass Books of the Dream Eaters =

2006 novel by Gordon Dahlquist

- First edition (US)
- Author: Gordon Dahlquist
- Language: English
- Series: The Glass Books
- Genre: Fantasy, Adventure, Historical, Steampunk
- Publisher: Bantam Books (USA); Penguin Books (UK)
- Publication date: August 1, 2006 (USA); October 16, 2006 (UK installments); January 25, 2007 (UK Full edition)
- Publication place: United States
- Media type: Print (Hardcover, Paperback)
- Pages: 768 pp
- ISBN: 0-385-34035-4
- OCLC: 63705882
- Dewey Decimal: 813/.6 22
- LC Class: PS3604.A345 G58 2006
- Preceded by: None
- Followed by: The Dark Volume

The Glass Books of the Dream Eaters is the first novel by playwright Gordon Dahlquist and was published in the US on August 1, 2006. First sequel, The Dark Volume, was published in the UK by Penguin on May 1, 2008. A second sequel, The Chemickal Marriage was released in 2012.

The idea for the book came to Dahlquist during jury duty in Manhattan in 2004, when he had a dream the second night about a mystery in a strange, dark, Victorian building. The character who would be known as Doctor Svenson appeared in the dream, but for unknown reasons, Dahlquist decided to write about a young woman instead when he started to write the story the next morning, since a snowstorm prevented him from going out. Having no idea what it would be about or what would happen next, he made it up as the story progressed, and wrote the first 20,000 words by hand over three weeks.

== Plot summary ==
The book follows three main characters, Miss Celestial "Celeste" Temple, Cardinal Chang, and Captain-Surgeon Abelard Svenson, as they attempt to thwart the mysterious plot of a sinister cabal. There are ten chapters in the book, and each is from the point of view of one of the main characters. Chang and Svenson get three chapters each and Miss Temple gets four (the novel both starts and ends from her point of view).

== Publication ==
The Glass Books of the Dream Eaters was published in the United States on August 1, 2006, and reached the New York Times Best Seller's List on August 20, 2006. For the novel's publication in the UK, Penguin Books decided to publish each of the ten chapters as weekly instalments available to customers who paid for the subscription. The first chapter was published in the UK on October 16, 2006. Penguin Books published the novel in early 2007. Dahlquist was reportedly paid an advance of $2,000,000 for The Glass Books of the Dream Eaters, the first of a two-book deal. It is estimated that the publisher lost approximately $851,500, Bantam. The third and final book, "The Chemickal Marriage', was published in July 2012.

== Geography ==
The railway line upon which various of the characters travel during the story includes the following stations: Stropping, Crampton Place, Packington, Gorsemont, De Conque, Raaxfall, St. Triste, St. Porte, Orange Locks, Orange Canal.

== Reviews ==
- "Hearts of Glass" at The Guardian
- "A mysterious alchemy yields three heroes, glazed eyes" at The Boston Globe
- "The Glass Books of the Dream Eaters" at Entertainment Weekly
