= Niall O'Dowd =

Irish-American journalist

- Born: 18 May 1953; County Tipperary, Ireland
- Occupations: Author; Journalist
- Political party: Democrat
- Spouse: Debbie McGoldrick
- Relatives: Fergus O'Dowd

Niall O'Dowd (born 18 May 1953) is an Irish-born American journalist and author. He was involved in the negotiations leading to the Northern Irish Good Friday Peace Agreement. He is the founder of Irish Voice newspaper and Irish America magazine in New York City, as well as overseeing Home and Away newspaper. He is also the founder of IrishCentral, an Irish website which he launched in March 2009.

== Early life ==
O'Dowd was born in Thurles, County Tipperary in Ireland but moved to Drogheda when he was nine. After attending Drogheda CBS and Gormanston College, he was a student at University College Dublin, gaining a Bachelor of Arts degree in 1977. He emigrated to the United States in June 1978.

== Career ==
He moved to San Francisco where he founded the first new Irish newspaper in California in 50 years, the Irishman Newspaper. In 1985, he moved to New York City where he founded the Irish America magazine, the first ever national Irish American magazine. In 1987, he founded the Irish Voice newspaper, the first successful Irish American newspaper launch since 1928.

He was a founder of the Irish Americans for Clinton campaign in 1991, supporting candidate Bill Clinton for president. He led an Irish American peace delegation to Northern Ireland after Clinton was elected and he acted as intermediary between Sinn Féin and the White House at a critical period in the peace process. He played a key role in securing a US visa for Gerry Adams in February 1994. His role was featured in the book Daring Diplomacy by The Irish Times journalist Conor O'Clery and also in an RTÉ-PBS documentary entitled An Irish Voice. He has created numerous successful business networks through his publications including the Wall Street 50, Business 100, Hall of Fame, Legal 100, Silicon Valley 50 magazine in conjunction with the Irish Technology and Leadership Group, and the Science and Technology 50. He created the US Ireland Forum, a forerunner of the Diaspora forum held by the Irish government in 2009.

He is a close confidante of the Clinton family and served in Hillary's Finance Committee for her 2008 presidential run. In April 2011, at the inaugural Irish America Hall of Fame luncheon, former President Clinton stated that his initial involvement in the Northern Ireland issue has come about through O'Dowd.

He has written for The New York Times, The Guardian, The Irish Times as well as tabloid publications. He has spoken to groups involved in the Middle East peace process as well as the former Sri Lanka conflict about the importance of diaspora involvement in seeking solutions. A video interview with him on diaspora impact on successful peace processes was used at the US State Department Global Diaspora Conference in May 2011, chaired by Hillary Clinton.

In 2002, his book Fire in the Morning, about Irish people at the World Trade Center during the 11 September attacks, reached number two on the Irish bestseller list. O'Dowd was awarded an honorary doctorate by his alma mater University College Dublin in 2004, for his role in the peace process and his work on the Irish American and Irish relationship. O'Dowd was one of the founders of the Irish Lobby for Immigration Reform in 2005, set up to lobby the Congress for immigration reform that would secure working visas for an estimated 25,000 illegal Irish immigrants.

He was named among the state's most influential people by New York magazine in their issue of 15 May 2006. He was featured on the "People You Should Know" segment of the Paula Zahn Now program on CNN in 2007. In January 2008, he was appointed an adjunct professor at Columbia University Graduate School of Journalism.

In March 2009, O'Dowd launched IrishCentral a companion website to his two publications. The launch was attended by then Irish Taoiseach, Brian Cowen. In March 2010 he published his second book An Irish Voice, an autobiography. He became a Huffington Post blogger in September 2010.

In September 2014 the Irish government awarded him the President's Distinguished Services Award He wrote his third book "Lincoln and the Irish – The Untold Story" in March 2017. On 8 March 2018, the Washington Post magazine featured an article on his secret work on the Irish peace process called "The Negotiator" in the print copy and a different copy online. He was one of the featured subjects in a major book entitled "Nine Irish Lives" also in March 2018 which named the nine Irish-born Americans who contributed the most to America.

In 2020, he published A New Ireland: How Europe's Most Conservative Country Became Its Most Liberal.

== Irish Presidency bid ==
In early June 2011, O'Dowd announced he was considering becoming a candidate in the 2011 Irish Presidential election, calling himself "an Irish Diaspora voice." According to Walter Ellis, writing in the Irish Times, O'Dowd's goal was

...to call on the power of the Irish diaspora and bring it to bear on the country's crippled economy. He would rally the world's wealthiest Irish people and encourage them to invest in Ireland, North and South.

O'Dowd approached Sinn Féin and possibly other Irish parties seeking support. Sinn Féin, though then party president Gerry Adams, stated in mid-June that they had been "lobbied by all the independent candidates" including O'Dowd.

By 27 June, The Irish Echo declared the "Irish presidential field [is] starting to look crowded", citing a comment from O'Dowd saying "The reality is you have to fish where the fish are and the only votes for me are with Fianna Fáil and Sinn Féin."

On the same day, Gerry Adams announced Sinn Féin would "will make no decision on whether to back Irish-American publisher Niall O’Dowd or any other independent candidate for the presidency until it decides next month whether to run its own candidate."

On 30 June, O'Dowd stated he would not be running for the office. O'Dowd stated his reasons involved "The logistical challenges of running for an office as an independent against established political parties is incredible."

Walter Ellis, writing in The Irish Times remarked that, despite many impressive qualifications, "O'Dowd would not get my vote," calling him "too much of an Irish-American for the Áras."

An Irish Independent/Millward Brown Lansdowne poll revealed O’Dowd had been "way down the field of candidates with just 3pc support." Sinn Féin vice-president Martin McGuinness became that party's candidate, with backing from O'Dowd, and came third at 13.7 of the vote. Michael D Higgins was elected President of Ireland (see 2011 Irish presidential election).

== "Irish slaves" controversy ==
Writing in The New York Times in March 2017, Liam Stack noted that inaccurate "Irish slavery" claims had been given publicity in mainstream media including Scientific American, Daily Kos, and O'Dowd's IrishCentral. O'Dowd responded with an op-ed stating that "there is no way the Irish slave experience mirrored the extent or level of centuries-long degradation that African slaves went through."

Liam Hogan, among others, criticized IrishCentral for being slow to remove from its website two articles (one of them based on a piece that Scientific American quickly withdrew), and for the editorial's drawing comparisons between indentured servitude and slavery.

== Personal life ==
O'Dowd is married to Debbie McGoldrick and they have a daughter Alana. He is the brother of the Fine Gael TD, Fergus O'Dowd.
