= Aedin Moloney =

Irish actress and producer

Aedín Moloney
- Born: 5 July 1968 (age 58); Dublin, Ireland
- Education: Trinity College Dublin
- Occupations: Actress; producer
- Father: Paddy Moloney

Aedín Moloney (born 5 July 1968) is an American and Irish television, theatre, film actress, and producer. She was born in Dublin, Ireland. She is the founder and producing artistic director of New York's Fallen Angel Theatre Company. She is the daughter of musician Paddy Moloney.

After graduating from the Samuel Beckett Theatre Centre in Trinity College Dublin, she made her professional debut as Mollser in the Gaiety Theatre production of The Plough and the Stars by Sean O'Casey, directed by Joe Dowling and starring Donal McCann.

In 1997 she played Maggie in ITV's British television adaptation of Catherine Cookson's The Moth, directed by Roy Battersby and co-starring Jack Davenport. In 1998 she appeared as Sue Ellen Grogan in the BBC TV series Ballykissangel and, in 2000, in the role of Eva Joyce in the movie Nora co-starring Ewan McGregor. Her US television roles have included Tracey in Law and Order: Criminal Intent in 2003, Sister Mary Michael in Stephen Soderbergh's The Knick for Cinemax (2015) and the role of Mum in The Exorcist for Fox TV (2017).

She has appeared off-Broadway at The Irish Repertory Theatre's productions of Same Old Moon (1995), Juno and the Paycock (1995), Shadow of a Gunman (1999), Eclipsed (2000), Pigtown (2001), Playboy of the Western World (2001) and the 20th anniversary production of Dancing at Lughnasa (2012) and The Dead 1904 (2016) at the American Irish Historical Society. Playwright Barbara Hammond wrote a one-woman play for Moloney: Eva the Chaste, which premiered off-Broadway in 2011 with Fallen Angel Theatre Company. She also played the role of Dora in the US premiere of Airswimming by British playwright Charlotte Jones, produced by The Irish Repertory Theatre and Fallen Angel Theatre Company. She also starred as Morag in the off broadway premiere of When I was a Girl I used to Scream and Shout by Sharman Macdonald with Fallen Angel Theatre Company (2016).

In 2013 she received a Best Actress award from the New Jersey Footlights for her role as George Eliot in the world premiere of A Most Dangerous Woman by Cathy Tempelsman at The Shakespeare Theatre of New Jersey, directed by Tony winner Richard Maltby. In 2014 she returned to the Shakespeare Theatre of NJ to play Dol Common in The Alchemist by Ben Jonson, adapted and directed by Bonnie Monte.

She is the daughter of artist Rita O'Reilly and musician/composer Paddy Moloney of The Chieftains, with whom she has collaborated on a full-length audio recording of Molly Bloom's soliloquy from Ulysses by James Joyce, released on iTunes in June 2017.
