= New Dramatists =

Playwright organization based in New York City

Coordinates: 40°45′36.3499″N 73°59′34.7536″W

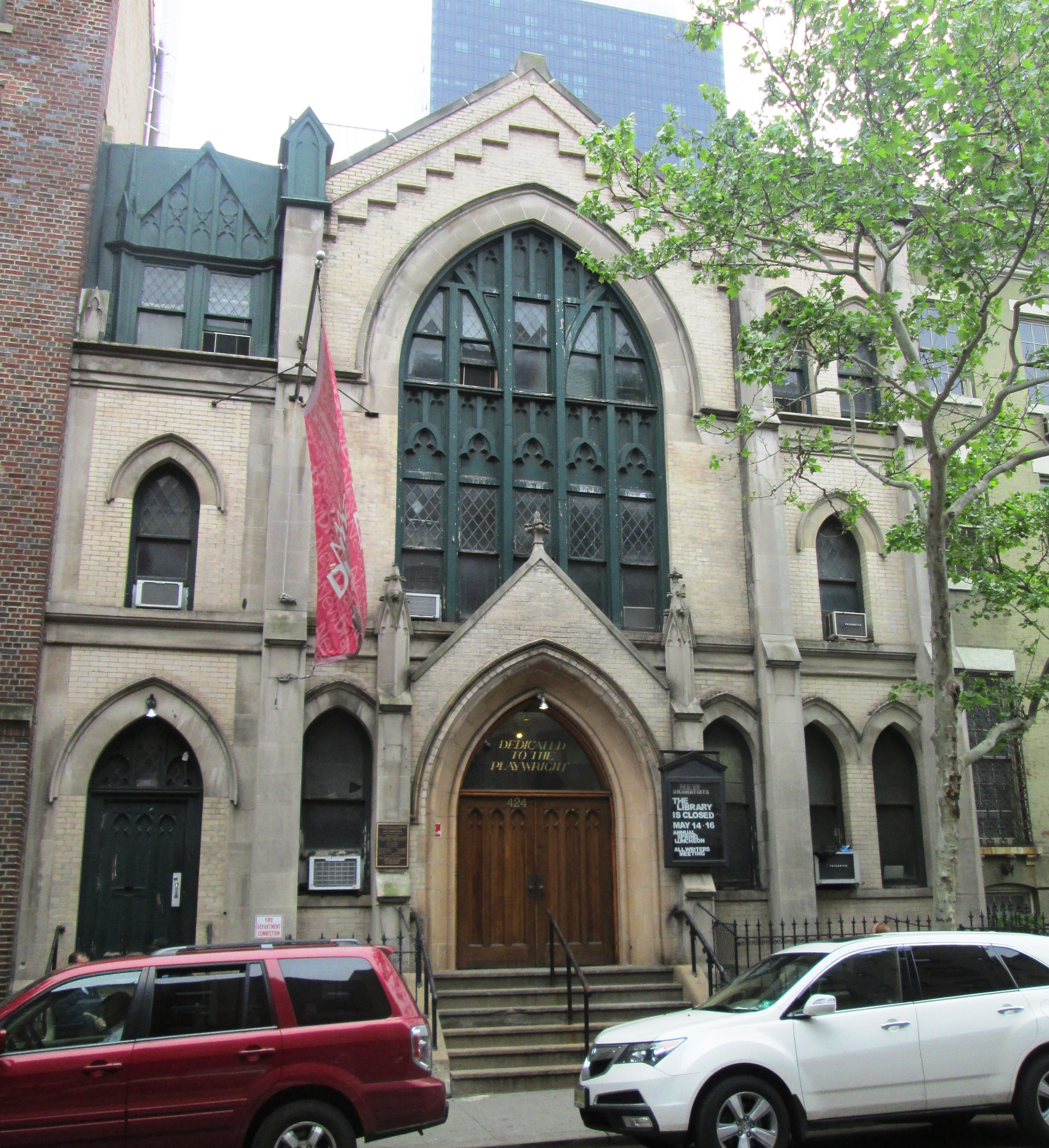
New Dramatists headquarters (2018)

New Dramatists is an organization of playwrights founded in 1949 and located at 424 West 44th Street between Ninth and Tenth Avenues in the Hell's Kitchen (Clinton) neighborhood of Manhattan, New York City.

The members of New Dramatists participate in seven-year residencies to build up their playwriting skills and develop their careers. In addition to housing resident playwrights, New Dramatists also holds workshops for young authors. The organization hosts an annual luncheon at which actors and producers who have made contributions to American theatre are honored. Brian Stokes Mitchell, Glenn Close, and Meryl Streep are among past honorees.

The New Dramatists have a library that is open to the public on weekdays.

== History ==
New Dramatists was established in 1949 as the New Dramatists Committee. Its formation was instigated by Michaela O'Harra, who became the first executive secretary of the Committee. Howard Lindsay was the first chair; other founders included Benjamin Schankman, Russel Crouse, Richard Rodgers, and Oscar Hammerstein II. The Committee was initially funded by contributions from the Playwrights Company, the Cornell-McClintic Foundation and a donation from John Golden.

== Building ==
New Dramatists is located in a former church built in the 1880s in the Gothic Revival style. It was the location in turn of St. Matthew's German Lutheran Church, the Lutheran Church of the Redeemer, the Lutheran Metropolitan Inner Mission Society, and, by the mid-1960s, the All People's Church.

== The Kleban Prize for Musical Theatre ==
The Kleban Prize for Musical Theatre is a $100,000 cash prize administered by New Dramatists on behalf of The Kleban Foundation, Inc. Board of Directors. Edward Kleban, the lyricist of A Chorus Line, created the Kleban Prize in his Will, which is given annually to writers of extraordinary promise. Past recipients include David Lindsay-Abaire, Jason Robert Brown, Lisa Kron, Michael John LaChiusa, Robert Lopez, and Shaina Taub.

== The Frederick Loewe Award for Musical Theatre ==
The Frederick Loewe Award for Musical Theatre is a $25,000 cash prize administered by New Dramatists. The award is divided up: $10,000 to the authors, $5,000 for a workshop production, and $10,000 for the New Dramatists program that supports musical development. Named after the legendary composer Frederick Loewe, the award honors an outstanding piece of musical theatre still in development. Past recipients include Deborah Brevoort, Mia Chung, Erin Courtney, Mark St. Germain, Karen Hartman, and Honor Molloy.

== The Princess Grace Award ==
The Princess Grace Awards Playwriting Fellowship is a $15,000 cash prize administered by New Dramatists on behalf of the Princess Grace Foundation-USA. Awarded to an early career playwright, the fellowship includes a one-year artistic residency at New Dramatists, inclusion of the winning script in New Dramatists’ Library, and an opportunity for winning play to be licensed and published by Concord Theatricals. Past recipients include Sheila Callaghan, Madeleine George, Branden Jacobs-Jenkins, Jesse Kellerman, Kenneth Lin, and Adam Rapp.

== The Joe Callaway Award ==
The Joe Callaway Award honors New Dramatists alumni for "exceptional ability and dedication to the craft of playwriting," as well as "service to the community." Past recipients include Lenora Champagne, Chisa Hutchinson, Honor Molloy, Jacquelyn Reingold, Kate Moira Ryan, and Cori Thomas.

== The Distinguished Achievement Award ==
The New Dramatists Distinguished Achievement Award honors lifetime achievement in the American Theatre. Awarded at New Dramatists' Annual Spring Luncheon Tribute, past recipients include Nathan Lane, Audra McDonald, Daryl Roth, Suzan-Lori Parks, Paula Vogel, and Denzel Washington.

== Alumni ==
- Robert Anderson
- Annie Baker
- Glen Berger
- Kia Corthron
- Jorge Ignacio Cortiñas
- Erin Courtney
- Jason Grote
- Nilo Cruz
- Horton Foote
- Richard Foreman
- María Irene Fornés
- John Guare
- Quiara Alegría Hudes
- Arlene Hutton
- Carson Kreitzer
- David Lindsay-Abaire
- Taylor Mac
- Eduardo Machado
- Donald Margulies
- Peter Maloney (actor)
- Joe Masteroff
- Tarell Alvin McCraney
- Honor Molloy
- Lynn Nottage
- Suzan-Lori Parks
- Sarah Ruhl
- Arnold Schulman
- John Patrick Shanley
- Harrison David Rivers
- Charles Smith
- Charise Castro Smith
- Octavio Solis
- Mark St. Germain
- Jeffrey Sweet
- Paula Vogel
- Mac Wellman
- August Wilson
- Doug Wright
