= Irish Voice =

NYC-based Irish newspaper (1987–2023)

Coordinates: 40°44′53.7″N 73°59′21.4″W

- Type: Weekly newspaper
- Publisher: Niall O'Dowd
- Editor-in-chief: Debbie McGoldrick
- Founded: November 1987
- Ceased publication: 2023
- Language: English
- City: New York City, New York
- Website: irishcentral.com/news/irishvoice

The Irish Voice is a newspaper published in New York City, New York. It focuses on news and stories from an Irish-American perspective. The paper was first published in November 1987 and was targeted at new Irish immigrants who were moving to the US in large numbers. The last paper issue went to print on July 5, 2023.

== Origins ==
The paper was founded by Niall O'Dowd in 1987. Circulation of the paper was claimed to be 65,000 in 2007. According to O'Dowd, his was the first Irish American newspaper to succeed since 1928.

The Irish Voice is very closely linked with the Irish Central website. Most of the newspaper articles are available from the site.

== Closure ==
Niall O'Dowd attributed the closure of the print version of his newspaper (in his Irish Post interview) to social media and online publications overwhelming the print media: revenue from newspapers in the US fell from $46 billion in 2002 to $22 million in 2020. The other major change was his target readership, which was new Irish arrivals in the US, the vast majority of whom were undocumented. His first issue featured a poll in which the vast majority said they would never return home. Such people were largely blocked by the Immigration and Nationality Act of 1965. In addition, the pressure to leave Ireland had reduced due to increased prosperity there in the 21st century and it was possible for newcomers to become almost instantly legal in Canada and Australia. He indicated that news would in future appear on IrishCentral.com, founded by the Irish Voice in 2009.
