= DeBerry =

DeBerry or Deberry is a surname. Notable people with the surname include:

- Allie DeBerry (born 1994), American actress and model
- Clifton DeBerry (1924–2006), American communist
- Coreontae DeBerry (born 1994), American basketball player
- Edmund Deberry (1787–1859), American politician
- Fisher DeBerry (born 1938), American football player and coach
- Hank DeBerry (1894–1951), American baseball player
- Jim DeBerry (born 1977), American businessman and comedian
- Joe DeBerry (1896–1944), American baseball player
- John DeBerry (born 1951), American politician
- Josh DeBerry (born 2001), American football player
- Lois DeBerry (1945–2013), American politician
- Virginia DeBerry, American writer

== See also ==
- Deanna Berry (born 1998), Australian rules footballer
