= The Arrest (novel) =

2020 novel by Jonathan Lethem

- Author: Jonathan Lethem
- Cover artist: Allison Saltzman (design), Dexter Maurer (illustration)
- Language: English
- Genre: Novel, science fiction
- Publisher: Harper Collins (Ecco imprint)
- Publication date: November 2020
- Publication place: United States
- Media type: Print (Hardcover & Paperback)
- Pages: 307 (1st edition, hardcover)
- ISBN: 9780062938787 (1st edition, hardcover)
- OCLC: on1229173081

The Arrest is the 12th novel by Jonathan Lethem, published in November 2020. It is a post-apocalyptic and pastoral science fiction story set in a small Maine town following the global collapse of technology. The pastoral life of the town is challenged when a nuclear-powered vehicle arrives, carrying the novel's antagonist. Reception of the novel was largely positive.

== Plot ==
The title of the novel refers to a technological collapse that occurred three years before the story's present. The cause of the arrest is unclear. It is depicted as having happened gradually and then all at once. It has made every technology dependent on electricity, gasoline, or gunpowder inoperable.

The setting is the small community of Tinderwick, located on a peninsula on the Maine coast. Thanks to its location and a pre-arrest culture of self-sufficiency among many of the residents, it has reached a sustainable steady state in the post-arrest situation. Tinderwick has had no news of the rest of the world since the arrest; seaward, a ship from France crashed with no survivors, and inland, the community is separated from the outside world by a second community, known as The Cordon. The Cordon claims to be repelling threats, and Tinderwick provides them with a portion of the goods it produces.

The narrative perspective is third person limited. The reader follows Alexander Duplessis, who is puzzled by his life choices and present indecisiveness. Most characters call him Sandy, the novel's antagonist calls him Sandman, and the novel's narrator calls him Journeyman. In the pre-arrest world, Journeyman was a successful Hollywood script doctor. The narrator notes that Journeyman should have been Tinderwick's storyteller, but in the post-arrest world he is instead the butcher's assistant and the community's bicycle deliveryman.

The peaceful agrarian stasis of Tinderwick is disrupted when Journeyman's pre-arrest professional partner, Peter Todbaum arrives in a nuclear powered “supercar” that he has driven to Maine from California. For decades prior to the arrest, Todbaum had been a hypnotic Hollywood pitch man and Journeyman his compliant listener and script-doctor. Todbaum and his supercar are presented as a gleaming, monstrous eruption of the old world, equipped with an espresso maker and glowing with radiation.

Todbaum's arrival initiates backstory: Thirty years before the novel's present, Todbaum and Journeyman were beginning their partnership generating film and TV scripts in California. Journeyman's sister Maddie visits, and she and Todbaum lock themselves into his hotel room for days, after which she departs angrily. Journeyman continues to be perplexed by and fixated on this event. At the time, Maddy told Journeyman, “He didn’t do anything to me that he doesn’t do to you.” Toward the end of the novel, she tells him, “You’re the only one who even remembers.” Subsequently, Maddy established a farm in Tinderwick that has become the post-arrest town's center of community and productivity. She is impossible to fluster and often characterized by the hammer she keeps hanging from her waist.

For Todbaum, the essential event of the motel stay was Maddy casually adding a crucial twist to a science fiction concept that he and Journeyman continued to work on all the way up to the arrest. The addition of Maddy's idea produced a concept that roughly mirrors the dichotomy of the world before and after the arrest. Todbaum asserts that the destination of this story is that he and Maddy are meant to be together.

Todbaum's arrival precipitates a division in the community, while Maddy remains indifferent and Journeyman conflicted. Todbaum becomes a nightly, compelling storyteller, feeding the desire of some to know what he encountered in his journey across the United States. Initially, while Todbaum holds a sizable group in thrall, he tells a typical post-apocalyptic story of ravaged cities, marauding bands, and enclaves with science fiction technology. The reliability of his narrative is questioned throughout the novel, including by Todbaum himself.

Eventually, most of Todbaum's audience drift away, as he declines to finish his story by telling what happened while crossing the area controlled by The Cordon. Meanwhile, The Cordon had decided it wants the supercar and begins pushing the border between itself and Tinderwick.

In the novel's climax, Journeyman remains relatively in the dark, while Maddy and much of the community carefully plan and execute a temporary move to an island, where they also construct countermeasures to a supercar attack. The Cordon half-heartedly attacks the town, and Todbaum, largely bereft of followers and a target of The Cordon, mounts a failed attack on the island. The supercar ends up suspended in the air, becoming the lighthouse the town had previously planned to erect on the island.

== Background ==
In an interview with Slates's Working Podcast, Lethem indicated that the novel began with the idea of the “supercar.” Driving west in sub-zero temperatures, away from the Maine town where he lives part of the year, Lethem imagined a vehicle going in the opposite direction,

“… to the town I’d just left and under conditions that were apocalyptic or postapocalyptic, this car being something that was outfitted for this destroyed world, this destroyed version of the United States, and it was going to disturb the quietude of this small town, which was a little oasis in the disaster. So, it all kind of just came into my head as an image.”

In the same interview, Lethem revealed that the novel was initially written in the first person, and that writer Steve Erickson suggested a change to third person. Explaining why he pursued this recommendation, Lethem said,

“… what I liked about this book, what I wanted to do was the same thing that had flashed into my head when I was driving cross-country. It was an iconographic book. It was about the shape of the objects as much as the characters and their voices… it was really about these iconographic shapes in space and [the first person narrator] was way too much in the way of that experience. You couldn’t see all of the shapes in space because he was blabbing at you.”

In an interview with the Los Angeles Review of Books, speaking to the timeliness of the story and its isolation themes during the pandemic (the novel was completed in February 2020), Lethem said that the book is,

“… an intentional project made of my thoughts and feelings, developed not suddenly and on-the-spot like some sort of journalistic memorandum, but out of the weird stew of what I’ve read and noticed and thought about for decades. I relate this novel distinctly to two earlier ones: Amnesia Moon… and Chronic City…”

In the same interview, Lethem connected reaching middle age with his decision to set his novel in a small town.

“I was very conscious of working in a pastoral mode, and I was thinking of books that emphasize, in their rural settings, the ongoingness of life. The young are born in such places and then set out. Either they return, and form the basis of that ongoing life, or they’re never heard from again, presumably swallowed into the cosmopolis.”

In an interview in Orion, Lethem commented on the novel's thematic focus on storytelling and storytellers, describing “the place I tried to push the book” with a question:

“What if the person the storyteller most resembles, despite being a perfectly harmless guy — what if the thing he most resembles in this new world is the problem? The past fantasies of growth and power and individual self-fulfillment? What if all the things a storyteller has been enmeshed in his entire life now really look kind of suspect and shitty?”

In an interview with Literary Hub, “Jonathan Lethem on the Wishfulness of Dystopian Fiction,” Lethem discussed utopic urges that underlie his fascination with the genre.

“I think my attraction growing up to reading dystopian and post-apocalyptic stories mingled a lot of different kinds of appetite and yearning and wondering with fears, with the kind of usual cautionary, “look out or it might get bad.” Some of that feeling is like, maybe that wouldn’t be bad, maybe that would be interesting or better.”

“… there’s some part of you that has an appetite for confronting the possibility that what you see around you is not a given, that it’s unstable and precarious… if you feel as I do, and I think a lot of people do, that where we are makes no sense… well, maybe you also yearn for not catastrophe in the worst sense, but for change that was just total, and that forced everyone to think differently and experience things differently and remake some of the things that are being advertised as permanent or necessary.”

== Reception ==
Reviews of the novel were generally positive. All reviewers noted that Lethem was handling the post-apocalyptic scenario in an unorthodox way, but their assessment of the meaning of this approach and the success of the result varied:

In his positive New York Times review, Charles Yu suggested that the novel was challenging the genre from both the writer's and reader's perspective:

“If anything, he seems more interested in unpacking assumptions built into such tales, and why we seem to have an endless appetite for stories that, presumably, should make us feel terrible… Maybe the point is that we (both storytellers and audience members) have gotten too good at this. Too good at making these stories, too practiced at consuming them.”

While appreciating the whole, Yu had some reservations:

“The feeling is similar to watching a virtuoso musician noodling, trying things out. There are soft spots, but then there are riffs that find an interesting line and take off into flights of extended brilliance… “The Arrest” may not show Lethem at the height of his powers, but as with so much of his work, it is inventive, entertaining and superbly written.”

In his negative Washington Post review, Ron Charles characterized the novel as a “vast contraption” that is “clever but not funny; a satire that never pricks its target.” Charles found the plot's action to be “inaction,” writing that the novel “settles quickly into an odd stasis, sustained only by the cerebral wit of Lethem’s voice.” Charles also took issue with the protagonist, describing him as “the blandest of heroes,” who fails to achieve “the definition and purpose that has always eluded him.”

In his The Guardian review, Alex Preston characterized “The Arrest” as “a dystopian novel in thrall to its own genre, full of knockabout comic book bravado, with regular knowing nods to literary and cinematic history. It is, in short, a blast.”

In his LA Times review, Charles Finch described the novel as “a wonderful read, the writing gracefully gonzo, the emotional beats often unexpected yet quite right.”

In his USA Today review, Mark Athitakis gave the novel three-out-of-four stars, writing that, “it has an unserious, gonzo attitude that’s welcome in a well-worn genre. Call it a shaggy-dog apocalypse tale.”
