= The Wall of the Sky, the Wall of the Eye =

1996 short story collection by Jonathan Lethem

- First edition cover
- Author: Jonathan Lethem
- Cover artist: Jacket design by Steven Cooley; Jacket illustration by Alexander Munn
- Language: English
- Genre: Science fiction
- Publisher: Harcourt Brace & Co.
- Publication date: September 1996
- Publication place: United States
- Media type: Print (hardback & paperback)
- Pages: 294 pp (first edition, hardcover)
- ISBN: 0-15-100180-4 (first edition, hardcover)
- OCLC: 32969434
- Dewey Decimal: 813/.54 20
- LC Class: PS3562.E8544 W35 1996

The Wall of the Sky, the Wall of the Eye is a 1996 collection of seven short stories by Jonathan Lethem. In 2002 a collection of the same name appeared in the United Kingdom that also contained seven stories, but two stories from the earlier collection—"Vanilla Dunk" and "Forever, Said the Duck"—were replaced by "Access Fantasy" and "How We Got Into Town And Out Again". All of the stories, as with much of Lethem's early work, have definite science fiction elements despite their widely varying content and some thinly veiled commentary on modern society.

The collection won a World Fantasy Award in 1997.

== US Table Of Contents ==
- "The Happy Man"
- "Vanilla Dunk"
- "Light and the Sufferer"
- "Forever, Said the Duck"
- "Five Fucks"
- "The Hardened Criminals"
- "Sleepy People"

== UK Table Of Contents ==
- "The Happy Man"
- "Access Fantasy"
- "Light and the Sufferer"
- "How We Got Into Town And Out Again"
- "Five Fucks"
- "Hardened Criminals"
- "Sleepy People"

== About the stories ==
"The Happy Man" posits a man who, due to having been raised from the dead by a government agency, must spend a portion of his conscious existence in Hell. During his periods of torment, his body remains on Earth, performing its daily routine but experiencing and remembering nothing. The story explores the consequences to the protagonist's family life, especially his relationship with his son, who attempts to model his father's experience of Hell as interactive fiction on a computer.

"Vanilla Dunk" posits a future in which professional basketball players no longer rely on their own skills but instead wear exo-suits which duplicate the skills of historical greats. The assignment of these skills is based on a draft lottery and much of the story centers around the resentment of some players when an obnoxious and ungrateful white player receives by assignment the "Jordan skills". The player finishes only one season before retiring for endorsements and forcing the "Jordan skills" into dis-use for another 15 years.

"Forever, said the Duck" is perhaps the most esoteric of the stories. Though not explicitly stated as such the many characters in the story appear to be computer program avatars of different aspects of the personalities of two lovers who have decided to purge their single past before embarking on a life together. The characters mingle and mix, literally, at a cocktail party and the aspects of the two lovers are revealed through both the shape and language of the avatars.

"The Hardened Criminals" uses a more gothic feel than any of the other stories and relies on the premise that criminals sentenced to life are literally hardened and used as bricks to construct the prison in which other criminals are incarcerated. The son of one of these criminals is sentenced and ends up being assigned the cell in which his father's face continually stares at him from the wall, much to his horror. This story anticipates some situations in Lethem's later novel The Fortress of Solitude.

"Light and the Sufferer" concerns a New York drug-dealer (the titular Light) who attracts the attention of an enigmatic, invulnerable alien being who seems to feed off the energies of human suffering. This story was adapted into a direct-to-video film in 2004, featuring Paul Dano and Eugene Byrd.

== UK Edition Replacement Stories ==
"Access Fantasy": In this near-future world, there is widespread homelessness and universal gridlock in an unnamed US city. To deal with this, those forced to dwell in their cars have their own virtual reality "Apartments on Tape" to diminish their ordeal, although social security helicopters and food and drink vendors are available to provide some solace. However, vehicular dwelling isn't forever, as some fortunate 'car people' can earn revenue as living advertisements to those who are fortunate enough to dwell in apartments, who live on the other side of a "One Way Permeable Barrier." With Margaret, a fellow living advertisement, the unnamed narrator is initially assigned to an "undermall," but illegally travels to an apartment, where he is apprehended, but not Margaret.

In "How We Got into Town and Out Again," Gloria and Lewis are virtual reality vendors in a bleak future where the United States may have disintegrated into balkanised jurisdictions, protected by civilian militia, as in the small town that the pair visit during this short story. They run virtual reality competitions (or "scapes"), which provide opportunities for their smalltown challengers to compete in structured media environments similar to today's PC gaming. For some reason, casual sex is unknown in this world. However, the virtual reality craze wears off, and Gloria, Lewis, and their virtual reality rig travel onward, possibly to San Francisco. The story is a vitriolic satire of cyberpunk fiction.

== UK Edition ==
- Jonathan Lethem: The Wall of the Sky, the Wall of the Eye: London: Faber and Faber: 2005, c1996: ISBN 0-571-22580-2
