= Boerum Hill =

Neighborhood in New York City

- Neighborhood
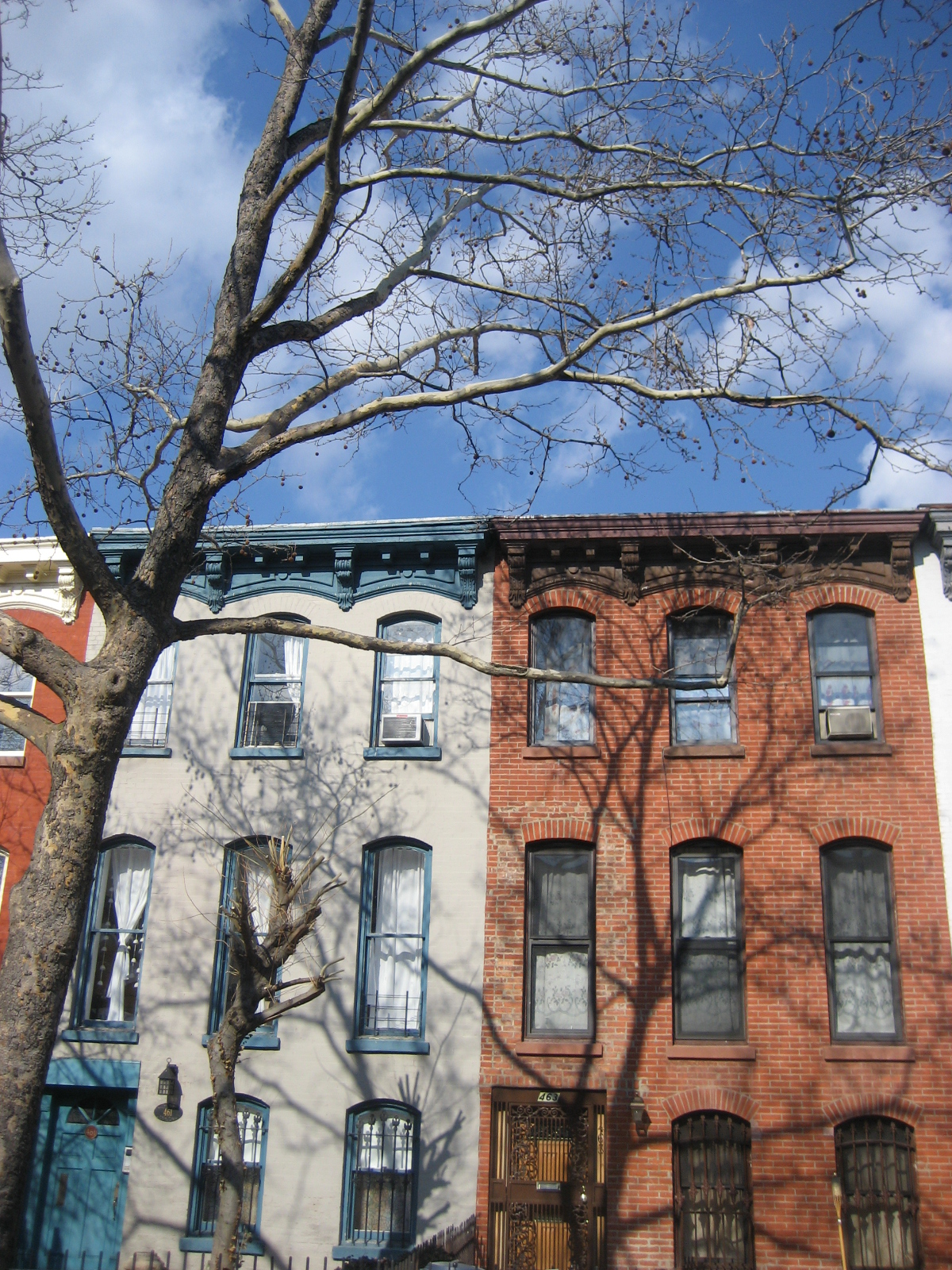
- Rowhouses in Boerum Hill
- Interactive map of Boerum Hill
- Location within New York City
- Coordinates: 40°41′09″N 73°59′11″W
- Country: United States
- State: New York
- City: New York City
- Borough: Brooklyn
- Established: 1964
- Founder: Helen Buckler
- Time zone: UTC-5 (Eastern (EST))
- ZIP Codes: 11201,11217
- Area codes: 718, 347, 929

Boerum Hill (pronounced /ˈbɔːrəm/ BOR-əm) is a small neighborhood in the northwestern portion of the New York City borough of Brooklyn, bounded by Schermerhorn Street to the north and Fourth Avenue to the east. The western border is variously given as either Smith or Court Street, and Warren or Wyckoff Street as the southern edge.

Smith Street and Atlantic Avenue are the neighborhood's main commercial districts. The Brooklyn High School of the Arts is in the neighborhood on Dean Street and Third Avenue. The neighborhood is part of Brooklyn Community District 2 and is served by the NYPD's 84th Precinct.

== History ==
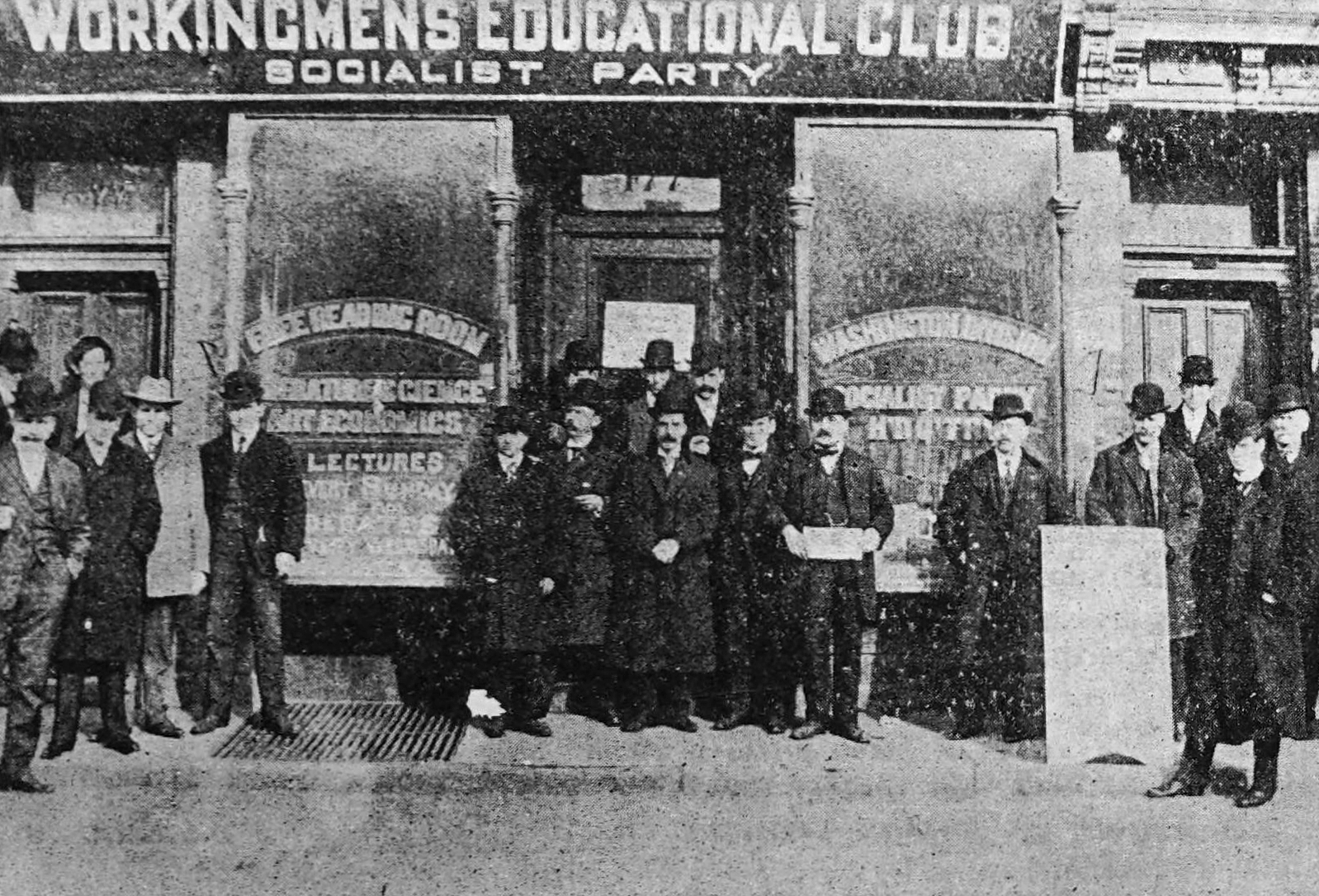
The Workingmen's Educational Club, a meeting hall for the Socialist Party of America at 477 Atlantic Avenue c. July 1909

Boerum Hill is named for the colonial farm of the Boerum family, which occupied most of the area during early Dutch settlement. According to the 1790 census, John Boerum's family owned at least two enslaved people.

Most of the housing in Boerum Hill consists of three-story row houses built between 1840 and 1870. Despite the "hill" in the name, the neighborhood is relatively flat; some parts sit atop former marshes that bordered Gowanus Creek. In the 1950s, all the neighborhoods south of Atlantic Avenue and west of Prospect Park were known generically as South Brooklyn. Boerum Hill in particular was sometimes called "North Gowanus". The name "Boerum Hill" was coined in early 1964 by Boerum Hill Association founder Helen Buckler, referencing the name of the colonial farmers.

From the early 1970s until about 2003, Boerum Hill was populated mostly by working class and middle-class African-American and Puerto Rican families. Since about the late 1990s, gentrification has changed the neighborhood to one of mostly upper-class individuals, though working-class families still reside in the immediate area.

In the early twentieth century, many of the buildings were run as boarding houses. Nearby was the union hall for ironworkers, who came to the city to work on bridges and skyscrapers. The north end of Smith Street was the center of New York City's Mohawk community, who came mostly from Akwesasne and Kahnawake, Mohawk reserves in Quebec, Canada. (Akwesasne extends across national boundaries into New York state.) Many of the Mohawk men were ironworkers, while their wives worked at a variety of jobs and created the community for their families. For 50 years, the Mohawk families called their neighborhood "Little Caughnawaga," after the homeland of Kahnawake. Many families would travel back to Kahnawake in the summer. The Mohawk language was widely used in daily life, including at the Cuyler Church.

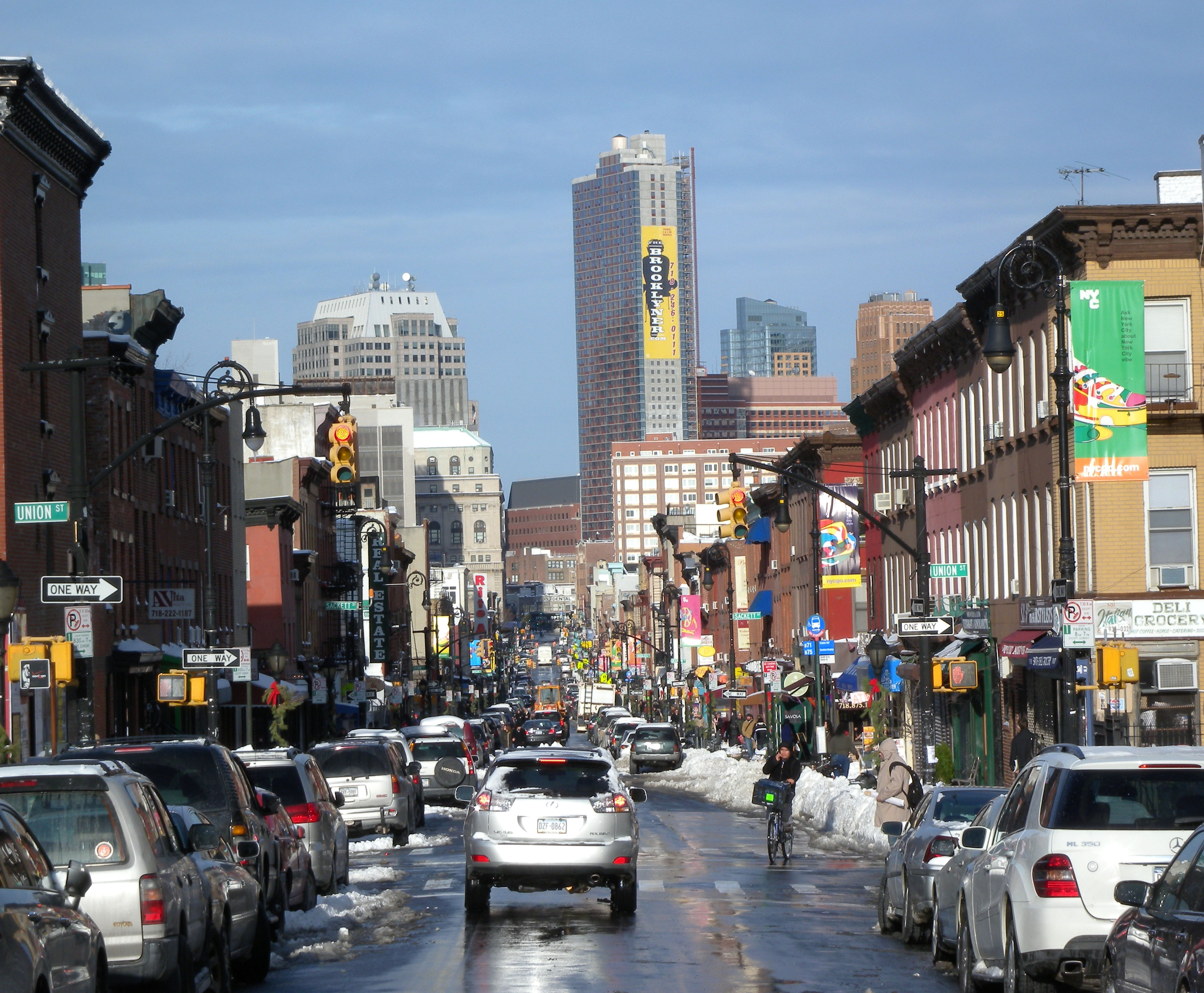
Smith Street commercial strip

The Boerum Hill Historic District was first recognized and designated by the New York City Landmarks Preservation Commission on November 20, 1973, after many years of advocacy by the Boerum Hill Association. The Boerum Hill Historic District was then listed on the National Register of Historic Places in 1983. Many of its buildings are landmarked.

In 2012, Boerum Hill had the sixth highest neighborhood median home prices among all New York City neighborhoods, and the highest of any neighborhood outside Manhattan.

== Culture ==
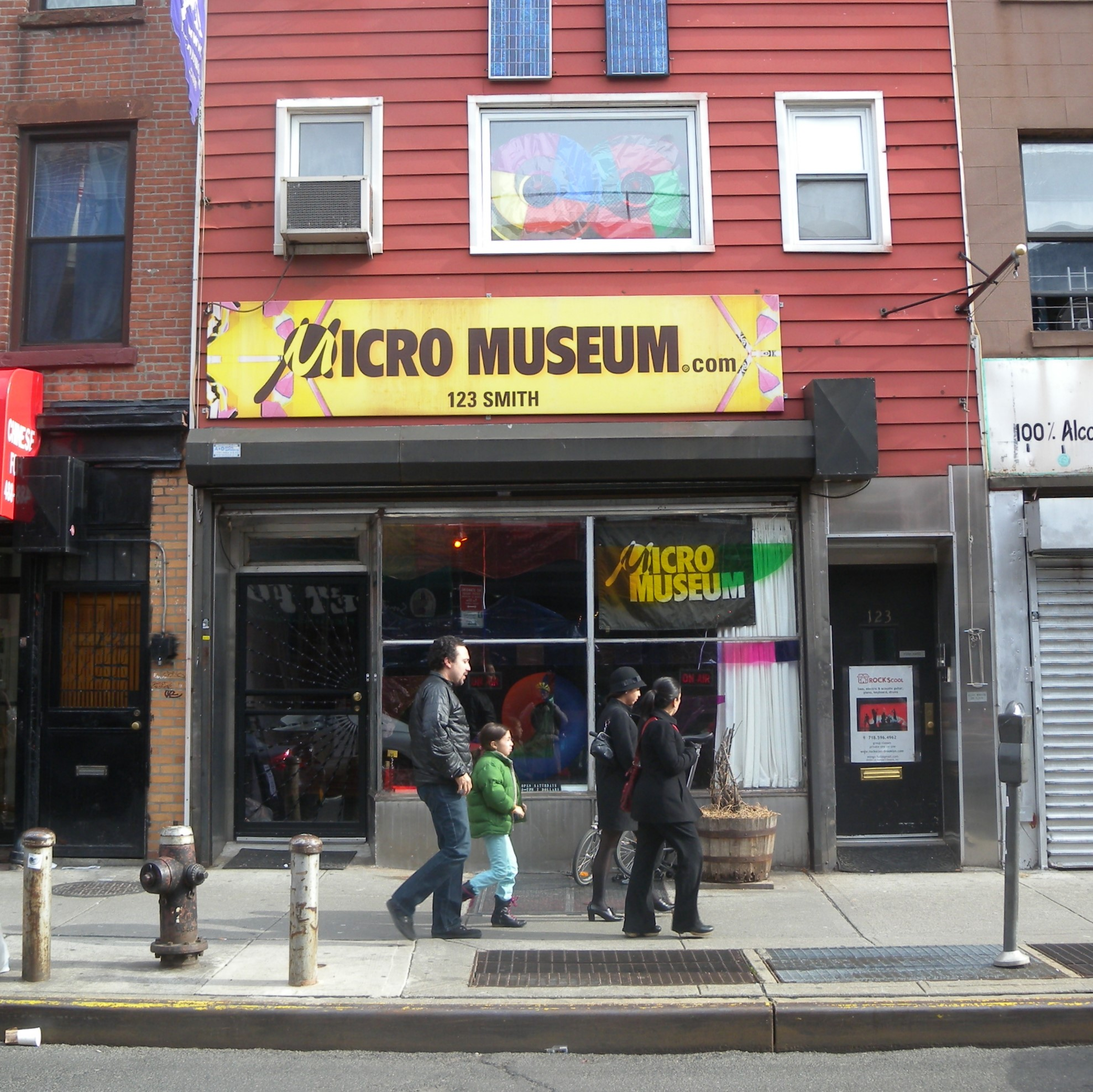
Micro Museum, 123 Smith St

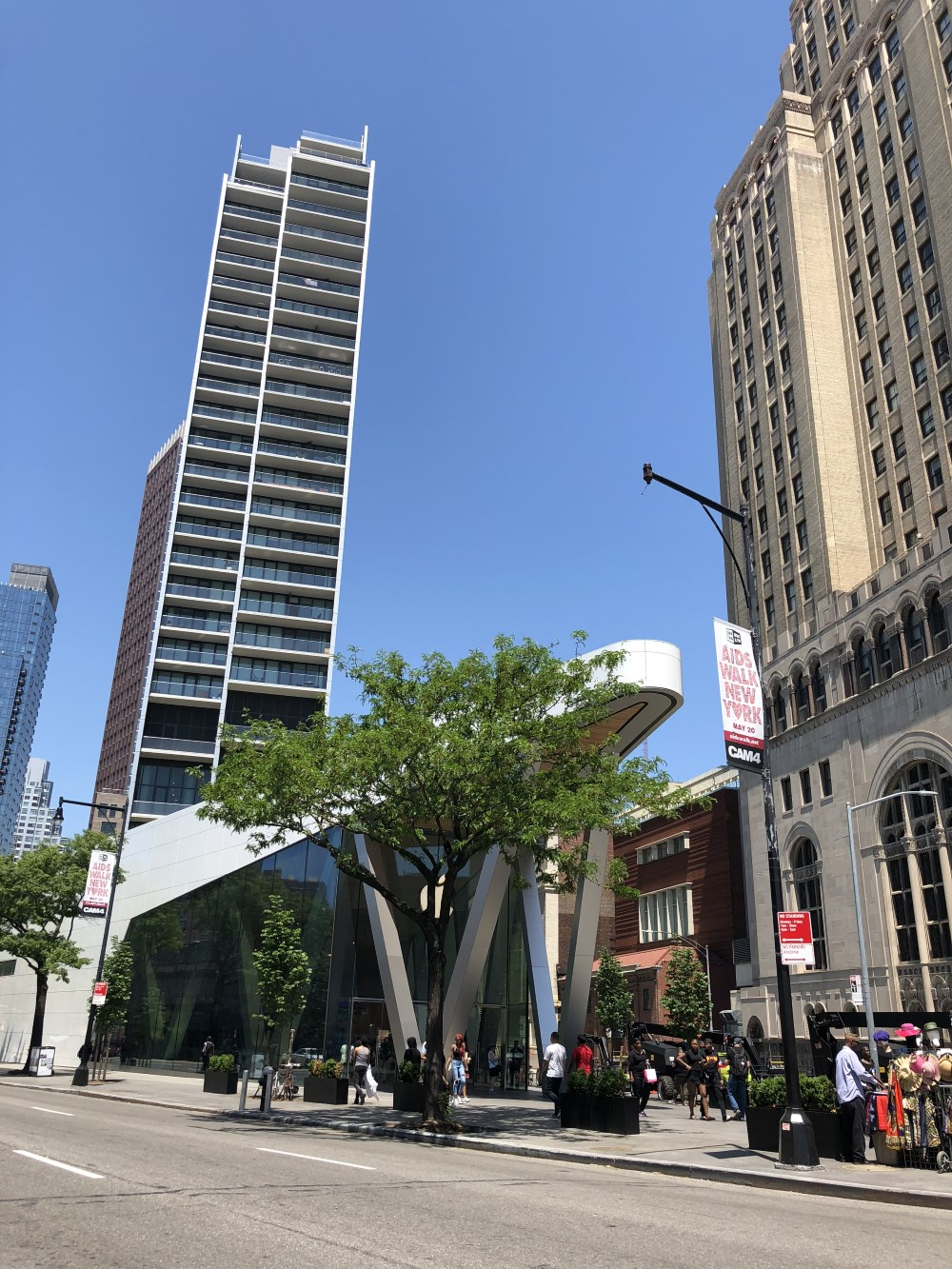
Apple Store at Flatbush and Fourth Avenues

Boerum Hill is known for its independent boutiques, restaurants and rows of brownstones. Boerum Hill is home to many artists who own art galleries in the neighborhood and to many young families, and biking is popular in the neighborhood and nearby Prospect Park. Cultural offerings include The Invisible Dog Art Center, Roulette, Issue Project Room, and BAM. There are also the Smith Street restaurant row and the Atlantic Avenue design district.

The neighborhood has been featured in several contemporary creative works. It is the setting of Spike Lee's movie Clockers (1995), which was filmed in the Gowanus Houses. It is the setting for two of Jonathan Lethem's novels: Motherless Brooklyn (1999), a crime mystery set on Bergen Street between Smith and Hoyt streets; and The Fortress of Solitude (2002), set primarily on one block in Boerum Hill (Dean Street between Nevins and Bond streets).

== Library ==
The Brooklyn Public Library (BPL)'s Pacific branch is at 25 Fourth Avenue near Pacific Street. Opened in 1905, it is Brooklyn's oldest Carnegie library.

== Media ==
WBAI 99.5 FM, a non-commercial, listener-supported radio station, is part of the Pacifica Network and has studios and offices at 388 Atlantic Avenue.

== Notable residents ==
- Jonathan Ames (born 1964), author
- Jean-Michel Basquiat (1960–1988), artist
- Lilly Burns, producer
- Michael T. Cahill, Dean of Brooklyn Law School
- Paul Dano (born 1984), actor
- Shaun Donovan (born 1966), former US Secretary of Housing and Urban Development and Director of the Office of Management and Budget
- Rosaline Elbay, actress
- Donato Giancola (born 1967), artist specializing in narrative realism with science fiction and fantasy content
- Hugo Guinness (born 1959), artist and screenwriter
- Duncan Hannah (1952-2022), artist and author
- Ethan Hawke (born 1970), actor
- Zoe Kazan (born 1983), actress
- Chuck Klosterman (born 1972), writer
- Heath Ledger (1979–2008), actor
- Jonathan Lethem (born 1964), writer, lived here as a child
- Emily Mortimer (born 1971), actress
- Alessandro Nivola (born 1972), actor
- Lynn Nottage (born 1964), playwright
- Sandra Oh (born 1971), actress
- Joan Osborne (born 1962), singer-songwriter
- Lana Parrilla (born 1977), actress
- Alex Rice (born 1972), actress
- Keri Russell (born 1976), actress
- Ryan Serhant (born 1984), actor, television personality, real estate agent
- Merritt Wever (born 1980), actress
- Michelle Williams (born 1980), actress
