= Motherless Brooklyn =

2019 film by Edward Norton

- Theatrical release poster
- Directed by: Edward Norton
- Screenplay by: Edward Norton
- Based on: Motherless Brooklyn by Jonathan Lethem
- Produced by: Edward Norton; Bill Migliore; Gigi Pritzker; Rachel Shane; Michael Bederman
- Starring: Edward Norton; Bruce Willis; Gugu Mbatha-Raw; Bobby Cannavale; Cherry Jones; Alec Baldwin; Willem Dafoe
- Cinematography: Dick Pope
- Edited by: Joe Klotz
- Music by: Daniel Pemberton
- Production companies: Class 5 Films; MWM Studios
- Distributed by: Warner Bros. Pictures
- Release dates: August 30, 2019 (Telluride); November 1, 2019 (United States)
- Running time: 144 minutes
- Country: United States
- Language: English
- Budget: $26 million
- Box office: $18.6 million

Motherless Brooklyn is a 2019 American neo-noir crime film written, produced, and directed by Edward Norton, based on the 1999 novel by Jonathan Lethem. Set in 1957 New York City, the film stars Norton as a private investigator with Tourette syndrome, who is determined to solve the murder of his mentor. Motherless Brooklyn also stars Bruce Willis, Gugu Mbatha-Raw, Bobby Cannavale, Cherry Jones, Alec Baldwin, Ethan Suplee and Willem Dafoe.

A passion project of Norton's ever since he had read Lethem's novel in 1999, the film took nearly twenty years to go into production. Although the book is set in contemporary times, Norton felt the plot and dialogue lent themselves more to a noir setting—moving it to the 1950s, with many added plot points inspired by The Power Broker, a biography of the New York city planner Robert Moses. Other members of the cast joined by February 2018, and principal photography began that same month.

Motherless Brooklyn premiered at the 46th Telluride Film Festival on August 30, 2019, and was theatrically released in the United States on November 1, 2019, by Warner Bros. Pictures. It was a box office failure, grossing $18.6 million against a $26 million budget. The film received mixed reviews from critics, with praise for its ideas and Norton's performance, but criticism for its length and deviations from its source novel. At the 77th Golden Globe Awards, Motherless Brooklyn received a nomination for Best Original Score.

Motherless Brooklyn is also Bruce Willis' final theatrically released performance (aside from a limited theatrical release for Midnight in the Switchgrass), as he shifted over to a direct-to-video market for the remainder of his career before retiring in 2022.

== Plot ==
In 1950s New York City, Lionel Essrog works at a detective agency alongside Gilbert Coney, Danny Fantl, and Tony Vermonte. Their boss, Frank Minna, rescued them as children from an abusive orphanage. Nicknamed "Motherless Brooklyn" by Frank, Lionel has Tourette syndrome and OCD, often alienating him from people, but his strong verbal and photographic memory make him a good detective.

Working a secret case, Frank asks Lionel and Gilbert to shadow him to a meeting. Lionel listens over the phone as Frank presents documents that threaten a business deal for a man named William Lieberman, who's there with his assistant Lou and an extremely large henchman. When Frank tries to negotiate a high price, the men force him to take them to the originals. Lionel and Gilbert follow in their car, arriving just as Frank is shot. They take him to the hospital, but Frank dies.

Frank's widow Julia leaves Tony in charge of the office. Lionel begins wearing Frank's hat and coat, and a matchbook in Frank's pocket leads Lionel to an African-American owned jazz bar in Harlem. He realizes that Frank's findings involve Laura Rose, who works for Gabby Horowitz fighting urban renewal; poor and minority neighborhoods are being bought out and demolished, forcing out their residents. Lionel goes to a public meeting where Moses Randolph, a commissioner of several development authorities, is loudly contested by Horowitz and the audience. Stealing a reporter's credentials, Lionel talks to a man named Paul who raged against Moses at the meeting and tells him Moses is the real power in the city government, even beyond the mayor.

Under the guise of reporting on the urban renewal story, Lionel gets to know Laura. She takes him to a club Frank was investigating, where her father Billy – assuming Lionel is one of Moses' men – has him beaten unconscious. Lionel is rescued by a trumpet player, and discovers that Paul is Moses' brother and an engineer. He realizes Lieberman is receiving kickbacks on many of the housing deals, and that the housing relocation programs are scams. Paul presents Moses with a huge renovation plan to improve the city.

Billy calls Lionel, apologizing for the attack and offering to meet with information. However, Lionel arrives to find Billy murdered – with his death staged as a suicide. Staying the night with a distraught Laura at her house, Lionel admits his true identity and that he believes she is in danger. Finding photos of Paul meeting with Billy on his own, Lionel confronts Laura, who explains that her "Uncle" Paul is her real father. Paul denies this to Lionel, and explains that Frank and Billy planned to get more money out of Randolph's goons, against Paul's protests. He begs Lionel to find the evidence.

Lionel is brought to Moses, who invites him to join his team and stop snooping, with 24 hours to decide. Inside Frank's hat, Lionel finds the key to a Pennsylvania Station storage locker, containing a property deed and Laura's birth certificate, which reveals Moses is her father. Lionel gives the key to Paul and runs into Tony, who has been working surveillance for Randolph. Tony admits he has been sleeping with Julia, and tells Lionel to take Moses’ deal since Laura will soon be killed. Lionel races to save Laura, stopping her before she enters her apartment, and they flee. Laura knocks the large henchman off the fire escape, and Lou corners them with a gun but is hit in the head with a trumpet by the trumpet player, who drives Laura out of town.

Lionel meets Moses, who reveals that he raped Laura's mother, a hotel employee. Paul forged Moses' signature on the birth certificate and exposure of this secret threatened Moses. Lionel warns Moses to leave Laura alone or he will release the information. He informs Moses that Lieberman is on the take and asks that when Moses has Lieberman killed, to tell him it is for Frank. Moses tells Lionel to tell Paul that his plans for the city will proceed.

The next day Paul learns that Moses denied his plans out of spite while Lionel mails the information about Lieberman to the reporter whose credentials he stole. Lionel drives to the seaside property Frank left to him where Laura is waiting for him.

=== Differences between movie and book ===
Norton took significant creative license with Lethem's book, keeping only the character of Lionel Essrog, his mentor Frank Minna, and the idea of him investigating his surrogate father's murder; deviations The Atlantic's David Sims considers "both radical and baffling".

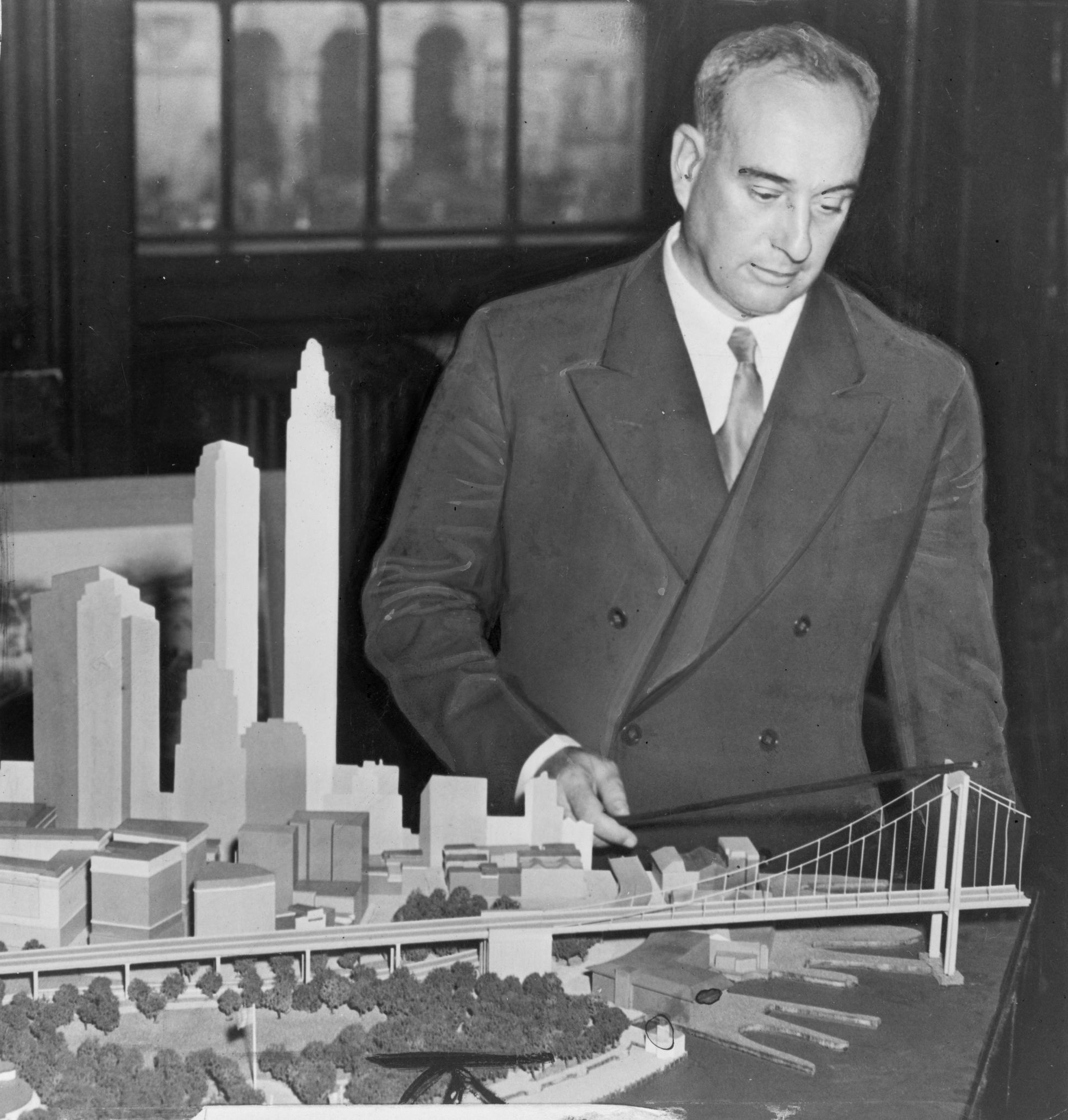
Robert Moses, controversial urbanist that inspired the character of Moses Randolph

Although the novel takes place in a modern 1999 setting, Norton rewrote the story for the 1950s, because the "characters are written in a very 1950s hardboiled detective style ... and if we try to make a film about the '90s in Brooklyn with guys acting like '50s gumshoes, it will feel ironic." While Lethem created a conspiracy revolving around mobsters, Buddhist monks, and Frank Minna's brother, Norton instead creates an entirely new conspiracy involving New York's (fictional) Borough Authority and the illegitimate mixed-race offspring of a powerful city official. Norton added characters such as Moses Randolph to the story, who is based on the New York City urban planner, Robert Moses while dropping others, such as Frank Minna's brother Gerard. For other characters, Norton drew inspiration from Hortense Gabel and Jane Jacobs who were prominent critics of housing discrimination in New York during the 50s and 60s, and he replaced the book's love interest Kimmerly with Laura, the unknowing daughter of Moses Randolph. Lethem spends considerable time in the book depicting Lionel's childhood at the St. Vincent's Home for Boys orphanage, something the movie only briefly references. While the book ends with Lionel going back to the detective agency turned car service, with his love interest leaving him, and most of his friends dead or missing, the movie ends with Lionel together with Laura considering a life outside Brooklyn.

== Cast ==
- Edward Norton as Lionel Essrog
- Bruce Willis as Frank Minna
- Gugu Mbatha-Raw as Laura Rose
- Alec Baldwin as Moses Randolph
- Willem Dafoe as Paul Randolph
- Bobby Cannavale as Tony Vermonte
- Cherry Jones as Gabby Horowitz
- Michael K. Williams as Trumpet Man
- Leslie Mann as Julia Minna
- Ethan Suplee as Gilbert Coney
- Dallas Roberts as Danny Fantl
- Josh Pais as William Lieberman
- Robert Wisdom as Billy Rose
- Fisher Stevens as Lou

== Production ==
=== Personal engagement ===
Edward Norton is the grandson of James Rouse, an urban planner who argued that housing should be affordable to all and that communities should be shaped by humanistic impulses rather than purely economic ones. Norton describes him as an anti-Robert Moses. Notably, James Rouse founded Columbia, Maryland, as a diverse, community-minded city, where Edward Norton grew up. In 1982, Rouse also started the Enterprise Foundation (now called Enterprise Community Partners), a nonprofit devoted to establishing international low-income housing. It estimates that it has created 585,000 affordable homes over the last four decades. Upon graduating from Yale University in 1991 with a history degree, Norton moved to Japan where his first job was to work for his grandfather's foundation.

About the link between this film and James Rouse, Norton said, "I did it as an homage to the things he cared about, and I think he would be very gratified."

=== Development ===
After making the 1998 film American History X, Edward Norton acquired the rights to adapt Jonathan Lethem's novel Motherless Brooklyn. In October 1999, it was announced that Norton would star in and produce the film. In 2012, Norton finished writing the script.

Norton was uncertain as to whether he would direct the film. He imagined shopping the film to directors such as Bennett Miller, Paul Thomas Anderson, and David Fincher. Toby Emmerich encouraged Norton to direct the film himself. In February 2014, the project was set, with Norton directing. Norton said that he was motivated to continue being involved in the film due to the election of Donald Trump as President of the United States.

=== Casting and filming ===
Production commenced in February 2018 in New York City, with Norton, Willem Dafoe, Bruce Willis, Gugu Mbatha-Raw, and Alec Baldwin, among others, set to star. Bobby Cannavale and Dallas Roberts joined the cast a few weeks later. Michael K. Williams was cast as a jazz musician. Norton has credited The Wire with giving him a long-standing desire to work with Williams and also called it "a great dissection of the complexity of American urban life". He also mentioned Chinatown, and how it represented a reaction to the politics of the '70s, as a direct source of inspiration for him.

Additional filming took place in December 2018 in Troy, New York. It took 46 days to shoot the entire film. The film was shot by Dick Pope and edited by Joe Klotz. Visual effects were used for the scene in Pennsylvania Station, which was demolished in 1963.

=== Fire and lawsuits ===
On March 22, 2018, a fire broke out in the cellar of the Harlem building where production was taking place, beneath the film's set. The resulting blaze killed FDNY Firefighter (posthumously promoted to Lieutenant) Michael R. Davidson of Engine 69. Production was temporarily suspended the next day, and was resumed a week later. Several lawsuits were filed in the aftermath of the blaze, among others, by Michael R. Davidson's widow against Norton's production company Class 5 Films for the wrongful death of her husband, and by Class 5 Films against the building's landlord.

=== Music ===
Norton emailed Radiohead singer Thom Yorke asking him to write a song for the film. Two weeks later, Yorke emailed him a song, "Daily Battles". Yorke's Atoms for Peace bandmate Flea contributed bass and horns. Norton enlisted jazz musician Wynton Marsalis to rearrange the song as a ballad reminiscent of 1950s Miles Davis, with pianist Isaiah J. Thompson, bassist Russell Hall, saxophonist Jerry Weldon and drummer Joe Farnsworth. Both versions were used in the film, and were released on streaming services on August 21, 2019, and as a vinyl single on October 4, 2019.

Composer Daniel Pemberton wrote the score for Motherless Brooklyn in less than four weeks and produced it in less than two weeks. He recorded it at Abbey Road Studios in three days. Norton told him, "I want like half Miles Davis half Radiohead. I want a big, lyrical, thematic jazz score but I also want this element of dissonance because of the character’s brain."

== Release ==
Motherless Brooklyn had its world premiere at the 46th Telluride Film Festival on August 30, 2019. It also screened at the 2019 Toronto International Film Festival, the 2019 Vancouver International Film Festival, the 2019 New York Film Festival, the 2019 Mill Valley Film Festival, the 2019 Chicago International Film Festival, the 2019 Rome Film Festival, the 2019 San Diego International Film Festival, and the 2019 Haifa International Film Festival. It was released in the United States on November 1, 2019.

== Reception ==
=== Box office ===
Motherless Brooklyn grossed $9.3 million in the United States and Canada, and $9.3 million in other territories, for a worldwide total of $18.6 million, against a production budget of $26 million. Some publications listed it among the box office bombs of 2019.

In the United States and Canada, the film was released alongside Terminator: Dark Fate, Harriet, and Arctic Dogs, and was projected to gross $5–9 million in its opening weekend. It made $1.1 million on its first day and went on to underperform, making $3.5 million over the weekend and finishing ninth.

=== Critical response ===
On review aggregation website Rotten Tomatoes, the film holds an approval rating of 65% based on 220 reviews with an average rating of 6.3/10. The website's critics consensus reads, "Motherless Brooklyn's imposing length requires patience, but strong performances and a unique perspective make this a mystery worth investigating." Metacritic assigned the film a weighted average score of 60 out of 100, based on 36 critics, indicating "mixed or average reviews". Audiences polled by PostTrak gave the film an overall positive score of 76% (including an average 3.5 out of 5 stars), while 46% said they would definitely recommend it.

Peter Bradshaw of The Guardian gave the film three out of five stars, writing, "It's a heavy meal to digest, but this is a strong, vehement film with a real sense of time and place." A. O. Scott of The New York Times called it "a very smart movie, bristling with ideas about history, politics, art and urban planning." Matt Zoller Seitz of RogerEbert.com gave the film 3 out of 4 stars, praising "the unabashedly political nature of the project."

Eric Kohn of IndieWire gave the film a grade of B−, commenting that the film "at least does justice to its source material by transforming the plight of urban development into an immersive shaggy dog story." Peter Travers of Rolling Stone gave the film four out of five stars, writing, "it's Norton's own performance that brings emotional connection to Motherless Brooklyn." Peter Debruge of Variety commented that "Lionel represents both an enormous new challenge and an incredibly unique variation on the otherwise worn-out private eye archetype."

Chris Tilly of IGN gave the film a 6.6 out of 10, writing, "The film has much to say about discrimination and inequality, but while the central detective story is intriguing, the movie all-too-often gets sidetracked down narrative cul de sacs, giving the 144-minute film serious pacing issues, and making it a frequently frustrating watch." Jake Cole of Slant Magazine gave the film one and a half out of four stars, writing, "Motherless Brooklyn feels altogether too tidy, a film that revives many of the touchstones of noir, but never that throbbing unease that courses through the classics of the genre." Todd McCarthy of The Hollywood Reporter called the film "stylishly made, politically driven, musically arresting, narratively confusing and, at nearly two-and-a-half hours, far too long."

=== Accolades ===
Accolades received by Motherless Brooklyn (film)
Award	Date of ceremony	Category	Recipient(s)	Result	Ref.
AARP Movies for Grownups Awards	2020	Best Time Capsule	Motherless Brooklyn	Nominated	
Camerimage	November 16, 2019	Best Cinematography	Dick Pope	Nominated	
Golden Globe Awards	January 5, 2020	Best Original Score	Daniel Pemberton	Nominated	
Hollywood Music in Media Awards	November 20, 2019	Best Original Score – Feature Film	Daniel Pemberton	Nominated	
Hollywood Music in Media Awards	November 20, 2019	Best Original Song – Feature Film	"Daily Battles" by Thom Yorke and Flea	Nominated	
International Film Music Critics Award	2020	Best Original Score for a Drama Film	Daniel Pemberton	Nominated	
London Film Critics Circle Awards	January 30, 2020	Technical Achievement Award	Daniel Pemberton (Music)	Nominated	
Satellite Awards	December 19, 2019	Auteur Award	Edward Norton	Won	
Satellite Awards	December 19, 2019	Best Adapted Screenplay	Edward Norton	Nominated	
Satellite Awards	December 19, 2019	Best Cinematography	Dick Pope	Nominated	
Satellite Awards	December 19, 2019	Best Art Direction and Production Design	Michael Ahern, Beth Mickle	Won	
Society of Camera Operators	2020	Feature Film	Craig Haagensen	Nominated	
Visual Effects Society Awards	January 29, 2020	Outstanding Created Environment in a Photoreal Feature	John Bair, Vance Miller, Sebastian Romero, Steve Sullivan ("for Penn Station")	Nominated	
