= A Gambler's Anatomy =

Book by Jonathan Lethem

- Cover of first edition
- Author: Jonathan Lethem
- Language: English
- Publisher: Doubleday
- Publication date: 2016
- Publication place: United States

A Gambler's Anatomy (published as The Blot in the United Kingdom) is a 2016 novel by American author Jonathan Lethem. The plot concerns Alexander Bruno, a professional backgammon player with "psychic tendencies". The novel received mixed reviews and was compared negatively to other novels by Lethem.

== Plot ==
Alexander Bruno is a gambler who encounters a high school friend, Keith Stolarsky, who has made a fortune in real estate. After their meeting, Keith agrees to pay for an expensive surgery Bruno needs to survive, and later becomes Bruno's romantic rival.

== Reception ==
The novel received mixed reviews, with some praise for the caliber of his writing, and Lethem's ability to combine elements from multiple genres. Dwight Garner referred to Lethem's naming conventions as "Pynchonian" and compared the central antagonist, Keith, to Maurice Conchis, from John Fowles's novel The Magus.
