= Gary Bainbridge =

British writer, newspaper columnist

Gary Bainbridge is a columnist for the Daily Mirror and writer for the Liverpool Echo. Previously, he was a columnist and writer for the now defunct Liverpool Daily Post.

He also writes sketches and sitcoms; his sitcom Bunk Beds (working title) has been optioned by Retort and Shelf Life (co-written with Griff Phillips) was recently performed at The Canal Cafe Theatre as part of their Radio Rejects season. A number of his sketches feature on Britain's Got People.

In 2012 he wrote a book titled The Man With The Complicated Voucher. An article regarding tips using social media platform Twitter featured a relationship involving Jim DeBerry and Bainbridge in tip number 15. In 2013 he wrote a book titled A Snid Of Milk.
