= Dissident Gardens =

2013 novel by Jonathan Lethem

- Cover of the 1st edition
- Author: Jonathan Lethem
- Cover artist: Ben Wiseman
- Language: English
- Genre: Political family saga
- Published: 2013 (Doubleday)
- Media type: Print (Hardback)
- Pages: 366
- ISBN: 978-0-385-53493-2

Dissident Gardens is Jonathan Lethem's ninth novel. It is a multigenerational saga of revolutionaries and activists, the civil rights movement and the counterculture, from the 1930s Communists to the 2010s Occupy movement, and is mostly set in Sunnyside Gardens, Queens and Greenwich Village.

The title is an obvious play on "Sunnyside Gardens". Later, a character in East Germany writes to his American daughter, describing his workplace:

The Werkhofinstitut Rosa Luxemburg, though it goes among those of us here by a nickname, Gärten der Dissidenz, which I suppose one might translate as "Dissident Gardens," ...

== Plot summary ==
The novel is divided into four parts, and each part is divided into four chapters. Each chapter tells its own coherent narrative, but the years, settings, and points of view of the chapters jump around.

=== Part I: Boroughphobia ===
Background information is provided on Rose Zimmer. A Polish Jew, she immigrated with other members of her family, the Angrushes, to the United States at a young age, and became an ardent Communist. She met the German Jewish immigrant Albert Zimmer, fellow Communist. They married in 1936, and had a daughter Miriam in 1940. The Party exiled Albert to East Germany in 1947 (for his uselessness in America), and then in 1955 expelled Rose, for having an affair with Douglas Lookins, a black police officer. But Rose gets the last laugh, because Khrushchev's secret denouncements of Stalin are revealed in 1956, leaving the American Communist Party in utter disarray.

In 1957, 17-year-old Miriam is out with several acquaintances. At some point, she secretly decides she wants to lose her virginity to one of them, a Columbia University student, and the two of them end up in her bedroom. Her attempt at seduction proves incompetent—the student is reluctant and they are both clueless—but their night is ruined by Rose making a scene.

In 2012, Miriam's son Sergius Gogan visits Cumbow, Maine, a small college town where Cicero Lookins, Douglas's son, is on the faculty, for information regarding his parents, of whom he has no memory, they having spent most of their time dedicated to their causes, including their fatal support for the Sandinistas, and also of his cousin Lenin "Lenny" Angrush, who died in a mob hit. Cicero is mostly uncooperative, resentful at the surfacing of strong negative memories of Rose as the Lookins' secret homewrecker and his harsh mother substitute during his adolescence.

In 1969, Miriam took 13-year-old Cicero to show off his supposed chess talents to Lenny. Cicero does so badly that he swears off chess forever. Miriam then takes him to get his horoscope, which is so bland she then takes him to have his fortune told by a chicken, which turns out to be "wear your love like heaven," a message Cicero interprets as approval of his incipient gay orientation.

=== Part II: The Who, What, or Where Game ===
In the summer of 1960, Lenny tries to exploit his in with Bill Shea, bringing a Tommy Gogan tape of a proposed anthem for the forthcoming New York City Continental League team, to be known as the Sunnyside Pros (short for "Proletariats"). His mission ends in abject failure when Shea breaks the news to Lenny that Major League Baseball has capitulated, and agreed to expansion teams after all, including the National League team that will be named the New York Mets. Lenny takes this as a betrayal.

In 1969, Miriam is a contestant on a popular quiz show. She sabotages her own chances by showing up slightly high, and during the show privately fumes over the non-activist trivia, musing over the categories she is really an expert in.

In 1940, Albert Zimmer gives a rousing, inspirational speech to a beginning Jewish commune in New Jersey, supposedly where he and Rose may themselves move to. Rose realizes belatedly her husband is simply following orders and is furious that she had been excluded from any information. That, and the fact she does not want anything to do with farm life, leads to her insisting they stay in the city, and soon they move to Sunnyside Gardens.

Tommy Gogan's early life story is told, culminating in him joining his older brothers Peter and Rye to form "The Gogan Brothers", a mildly successful Irish singing trio. In 1960, he meets Miriam, falls in love, and she pushes him to fully develop his activist leanings. But his first album is savaged in the underground press, and his talent peters out.

=== Part III: The Wit and Wisdom of Archie Bunker ===
Cicero invites Sergius to attend his morning seminar on "Disgust and Proximity". In trying to break down his students' resistance, he tells some of the horrors of his parents in his life. Afterwards, Sergius introduces Cicero to Lydia, who was visiting "Occupy Cumbow" as part of an "Occupy New England" tour. Sergius had met her the night before, amazed that Lydia was playing his father's music, which she explains was a forerunner for the Occupy movement. They leave Cumbow together.

Letters from Albert Zimmer to Miriam tell the story of his life in Dresden, East Germany. He has become a revisionist historian, specializing in the firebombing of Dresden and the implications of how evil capitalism is.

In 1978, Lenny sold the IRA some fake Krugerrands: identical gold content, but free of the taint of apartheid. The IRA gives chase, and after a few days, kills him.

After the killings of Miriam and Tommy in Nicaragua in 1979, Rose discovers All in the Family, falls in love with Archie Bunker, and projects herself into various scenes with Archie, symptomatic of her growing cynicism regarding politics.

=== Part IV: Peaceable Kingdom ===
Sergius' story from earliest memories to being raised by Quakers after the death of his parents is told. He becomes a pacifist and learns to play the guitar. He meets Rose once, in the nursing home where she is in an advanced state of mental decline. In her only full utterance, she calls him "Cicero", the first Sergius learns of his existence.

In March 1979, sponsored by the American Friends Service Committee, Miriam and Tommy visit Nicaragua. Before leaving the Sandanista-leaning León, Miriam writes a letter to a friend, saying that if she does not live, make sure Rose does not get custody of Sergius. They cross over into Somoza-controlled territory, and soon their hosts split up and separate the two. The chapter ends with the implication that Miriam is about to be raped and murdered.

In the early 1980s, Rose is committed to a nursing home after being found wandering and highly confused. Cicero pays her regular visits, and she recovers to the point of becoming the terror of the nurses. (Cicero's other motive for visiting New York is anonymous sex away from Princeton.) Cicero accepts a position on the West Coast, and in the year he is away, she deteriorates and dies soon after Cicero's visit back.

Sergius and Lydia drive to the Portland airport. They stay at the airport, and have sex in a bathroom stall, she leaves to hitchhike back to the city. Sergius, in trying to board, is treated as highly suspicious by security: he took more than an hour from entering the airport to finally checking in. He is detained, and security radios to have someone pick up Lydia. The book ends with Sergius realizing he is a "cell of one".

== Critical reception ==
Initial reviews were quite varied.
