= Jonathan Lethem =

American novelist, essayist, short story writer

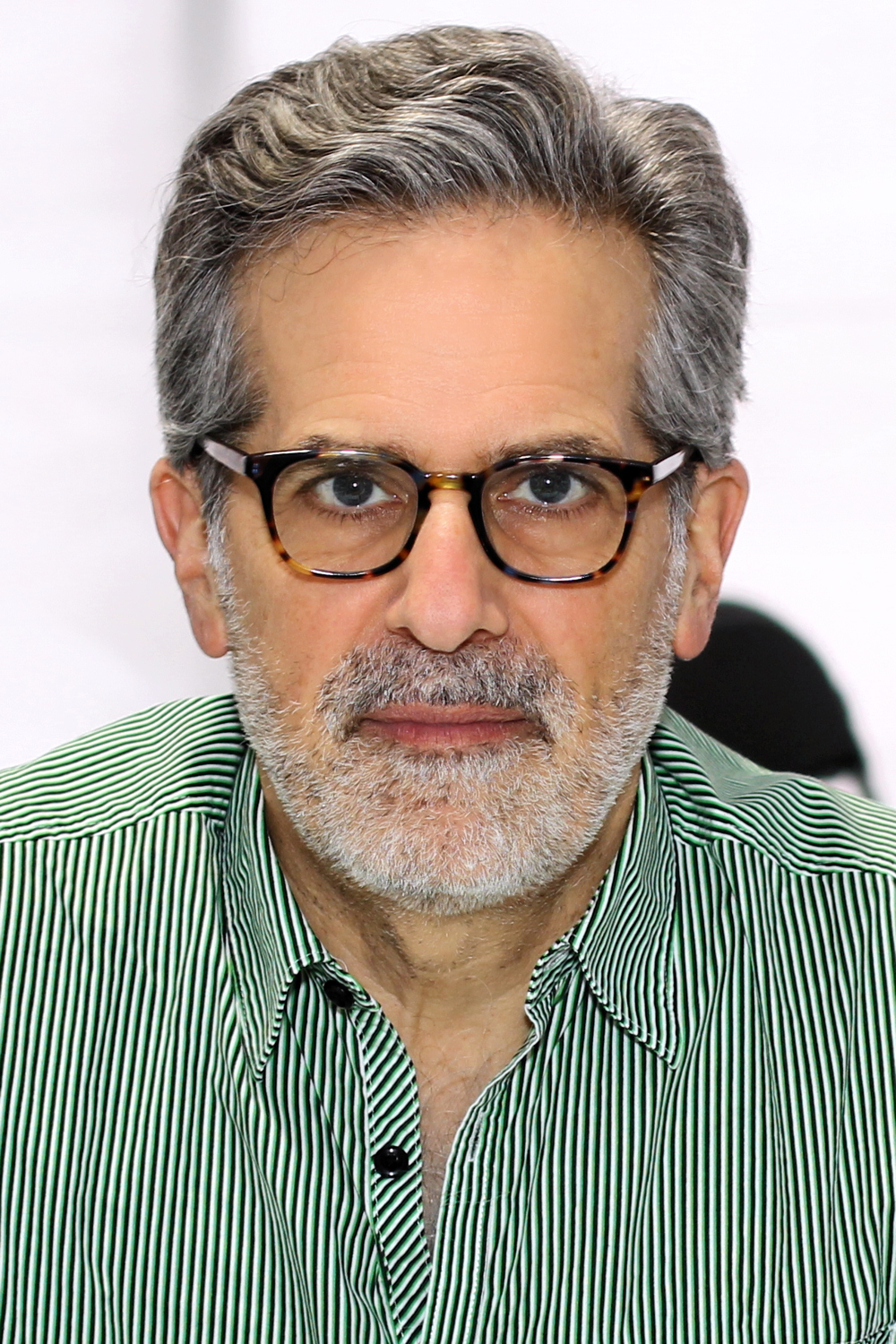
- Lethem at the 2023 Texas Book Festival
- Born: Jonathan Allen Lethem; February 19, 1964 (age 62); New York City, U.S.
- Occupations: Novelist; essayist; short story writer
- Spouse(s): Shelley Jackson (1987–1997); Julia Rosenberg (2000–2002); Amy Barrett
- Children: 2
- Writing career
- Pen name: Harry Conklin
- Period: 1989–present
- Notable works: Motherless Brooklyn (1999); The Fortress of Solitude (2003)
- Notable awards: National Book Critics Circle Award, World Fantasy Award
- Website: www.jonathanlethem.com

Jonathan Allen Lethem (/ˈliːθəm/ LEETH-əm born February 19, 1964) is an American novelist, essayist, and short story writer. His first novel, Gun, with Occasional Music, a genre work that mixed elements of science fiction and detective fiction, was published in 1994. In 1999, Lethem published Motherless Brooklyn, a National Book Critics Circle Award-winning novel that achieved mainstream success. In 2003, he published The Fortress of Solitude, which became a New York Times Best Seller. In 2005, he received a MacArthur Fellowship. Since 2011, he has taught creative writing at Pomona College. In 2025, he was awarded a Guggenheim Fellowship in fiction, a prestigious honor recognizing exceptional artists and scholars in the arts and humanities.

== Early life ==
Lethem was born in Brooklyn, New York, to Judith Frank Lethem, a political activist, and Richard Brown Lethem, an avant-garde painter. He was the eldest of three children. His father was Protestant (with Scottish and English ancestry) and his mother was Jewish, from a family with roots in Germany, Poland, and Russia. His brother Blake became an artist involved in the early New York hip hop scene, and his sister Mara became a photographer, writer, and translator. The family lived in a commune in Brooklyn, in the northern section of the neighborhood of Gowanus (now called Boerum Hill). Lethem's fourth grade teacher at P.S. 29 in nearby Cobble Hill was future New York City Schools Chancellor Carmen Fariña, whom he called the "perfect" teacher and to whom he dedicated his first novel, Gun, with Occasional Music. Despite the racial tensions and conflicts, he later described his bohemian childhood as "thrilling" and culturally wide-reaching. He gained an encyclopedic knowledge of the music of Bob Dylan, saw Star Wars 21 times during its original theatrical release, and read the complete works of the science fiction writer Philip K. Dick. Lethem later said Dick's work was "as formative an influence as marijuana or punk rock—as equally responsible for beautifully fucking up my life, for bending it irreversibly along a course I still travel."

His parents divorced when Lethem was young. When he was thirteen, his mother Judith died from a malignant brain tumor, an event which he has said haunted him and has strongly affected his writing. (Lethem discusses the direct relation between his mother and the Bob Dylan song "Like a Rolling Stone" in the 2003 Canadian documentary Complete Unknown.) In 2007, Lethem explained, "My books all have this giant, howling missing [center]—language has disappeared, or someone has vanished, or memory has gone."

Intending to become a visual artist like his father, Lethem attended the High School of Music & Art in New York, where he painted in a style he describes as "glib, show-offy, usually cartoonish". At Music & Art, he produced his own zine, The Literary Exchange, which featured artwork and writing. He also created animated films and wrote a 125-page novel, Heroes, still unpublished.

After graduating from high school, Lethem entered Bennington College in Vermont in 1982 as a prospective art student. At Bennington, Lethem experienced an "overwhelming. ... collision with the realities of class—my parents' bohemian milieu had kept me from understanding, even a little, that we were poor. ... at Bennington that was all demolished by an encounter with the fact of real privilege." This, coupled with the realization that he was more interested in writing than art, led Lethem to drop out halfway through his sophomore year. He hitchhiked from Denver, Colorado, to Berkeley, California, in 1984, across "a thousand miles of desert and mountains through Wyoming, Utah, and Nevada, with about 40 dollars in my pocket", describing it as "one of the stupidest and most memorable things I've ever done."

Lethem lived in California for twelve years, working as a clerk in used bookstores, including Moe's and Pegasus & Pendragon Books, and writing on his own time. Lethem published his first short story in 1989 and published several more in the early 1990s.

== Career ==
=== First novels ===
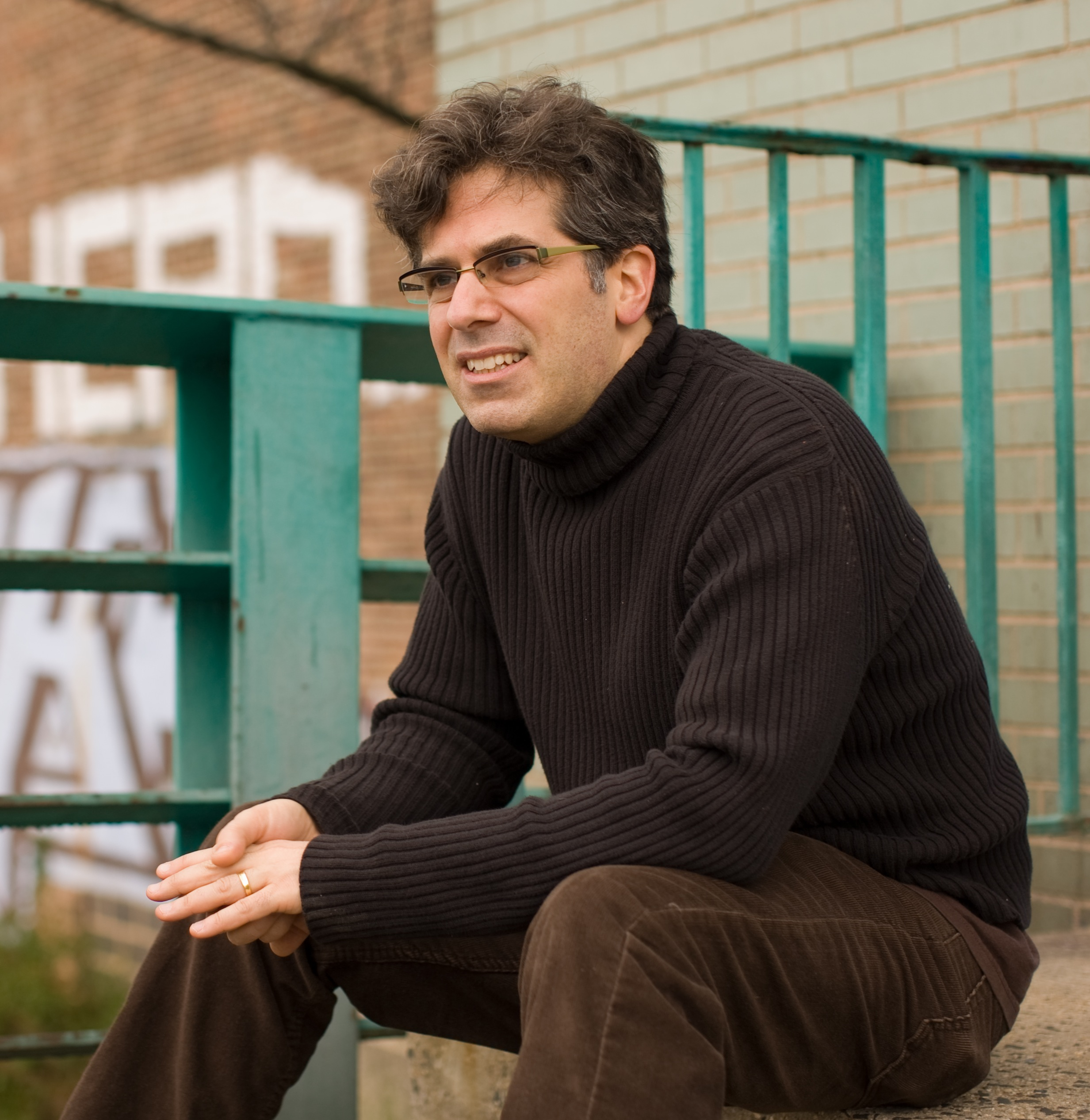
Lethem in Brooklyn

Lethem's first novel, Gun, with Occasional Music, is a merging of science fiction and the Chandleresque detective story, which includes talking kangaroos, radical futuristic versions of the drug scene, and cryogenic prisons. The novel was published in 1994 by Harcourt Brace, in what Lethem later described as a "delirious" experience. "I'd pictured my first novels being published as paperback originals", he recalled, "and instead a prestigious house was doing the book in cloth. ... I was in heaven." The novel was released to little initial fanfare, but an enthusiastic review in Newsweek, which declared Gun an "audaciously assured first novel", catapulted the book to wider commercial success. Gun, with Occasional Music was a finalist for the 1994 Nebula Award, and placed first in the "Best First Novel" category of the 1995 Locus Magazine reader's poll. In the mid-1990s, film producer-director Alan J. Pakula optioned the novel's movie rights, which allowed Lethem to quit working in bookstores and devote his time to writing.

His next book was Amnesia Moon (1995). Partially inspired by Lethem's experiences hitchhiking cross-country, this second novel uses a road narrative to explore a multi-post-apocalyptic future landscape rife with perception tricks. After publishing many of his early stories in a 1996 collection, The Wall of the Sky, the Wall of the Eye, Lethem published his third novel, As She Climbed Across the Table (1997). It starts with a physics researcher who falls in love with an artificially generated spatial anomaly called "Lack", for whom she spurns her previous partner. Her ex-partner's comic struggle with this rejection, and with the anomaly, constitute the majority of the narrative.

In 1996, Lethem moved from the San Francisco Bay Area back to Brooklyn. His next book, published after his return to Brooklyn, was Girl in Landscape. In the novel, a young girl must endure puberty while also having to face a strange and new world populated by aliens known as Archbuilders. Lethem has said that Girl in Landscape's plot and characters, including the figures of a young girl and a violently protective father figure, were "very strongly influenced" by the 1956 John Wayne Western The Searchers, a movie with which he is "obsessed".

=== Mainstream success and "genre bending" ===
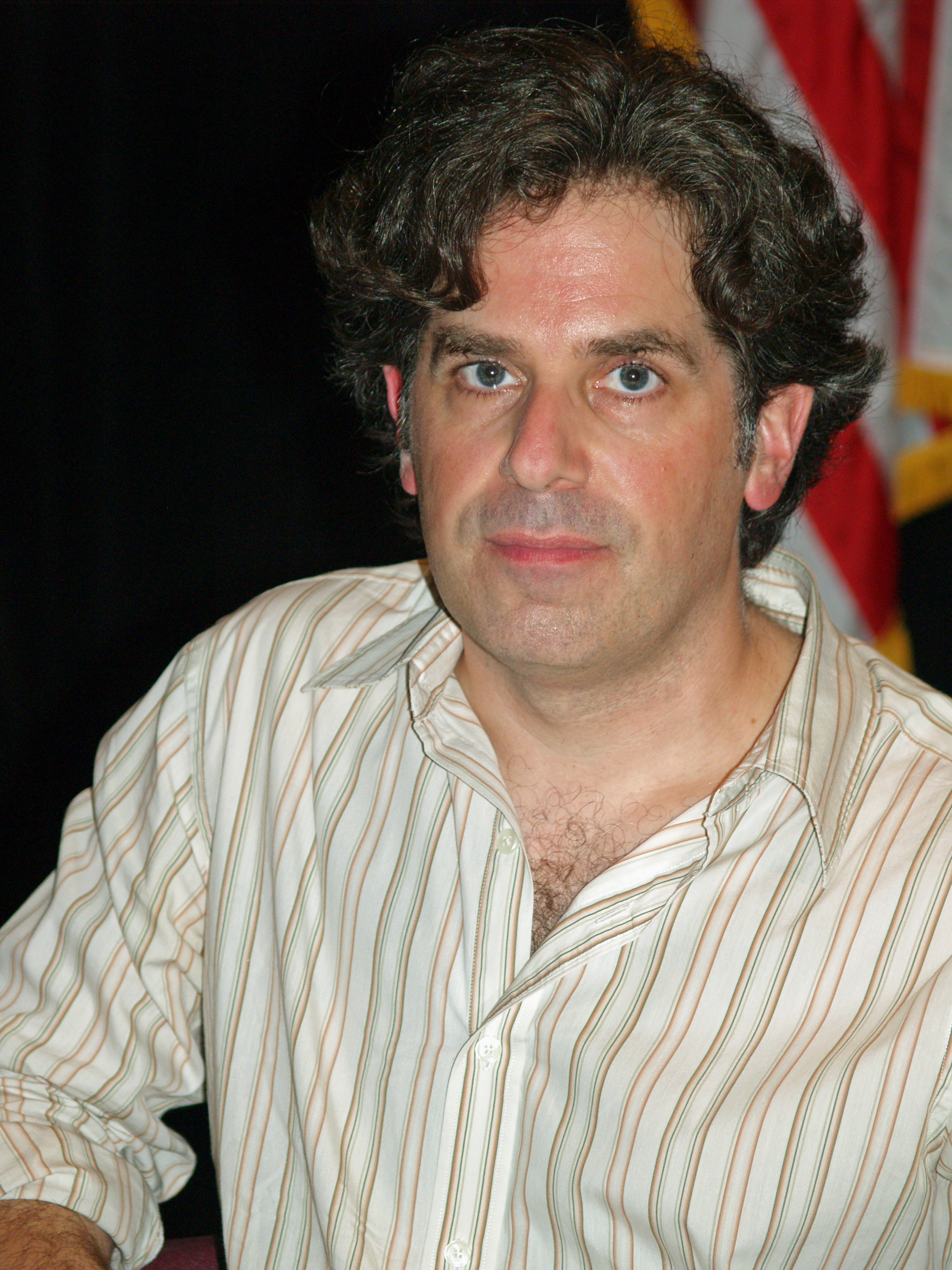
Lethem reading at the 2008 Brooklyn Book Festival

The first novel Lethem began after returning to New York City was Motherless Brooklyn, a return to the detective theme. He maintained objective realism while exploring subjective alterity through Lionel Essrog. His protagonist has Tourette's syndrome and is obsessed with language. Lethem later said that Essrog

... obviously [is] the character I've written with whom I most identify ... [the novel] stands outside myself ... It's the only one which doesn't need me, never did. It would have found someone to write it, by necessity.

Upon its publication in 1999, Motherless Brooklyn won the National Book Critics Circle Award for Fiction, The Macallan Gold Dagger for crime fiction, and the Salon Book Award; it was named book of the year by Esquire. In 1999, actor Edward Norton announced that he was planning to write, direct and star in a film adaptation of the novel. Norton's film was released in 2019.

According to The New York Times, the mainstream success of Motherless Brooklyn made Lethem "something of a hipster celebrity", and he was referred to several times as a "genre bender". Critics cited the variety of Lethem's novels, which were alternately hard-boiled detective fiction, science fiction, and autobiographical. Lethem credited his comfort in genre-mixing to his father's art, which "always combined observed and imagined reality on the same canvas, very naturally, very un-self-consciously." In Time magazine, Lev Grossman classed Lethem with a movement of authors similarly eager to blend literary and popular writing, including Michael Chabon (with whom Lethem is friends), Margaret Atwood, and Susanna Clarke.

In 2003, Lethem commented on the concept of "genre bending":

The fact is, I used to get very involved, six or seven years ago, and before that, in questions of taxonomy of genre, and in the idea—which is ultimately a political idea—that a given writer, perhaps me, could in some objective way alter or reorganize the boundaries between genres. ... Nowadays, I've come to feel that talking about categories, about "high" and "low", about genre and their boundaries and the blurring of those boundaries, all consists only of an elaborate way to avoid actually discussing what moves and interests me about books—my own, and others'. What I like are books in their homely actuality—the insides of the books, the mysterious movements of characters and situations and the emotions that accompany those movements. The play of sentences, their infinite variety.

In the early 2000s, Lethem published a story collection, edited two anthologies, wrote magazine pieces, and published the 55-page novella This Shape We're In (2000). This Shape We're In was one of the first offerings from McSweeney's Books, the publishing imprint that developed from Dave Eggers' McSweeney's Quarterly Concern.

In November 2000, Lethem said that he was working on an uncharacteristically "big sprawling" novel, about a child who grows up to be a rock journalist. The novel was published in 2003 as The Fortress of Solitude. The semi-autobiographical bildungsroman features dozens of characters in a variety of milieus, but features a tale of racial tensions and boyhood in Brooklyn during the late 1970s. The main characters are two friends of different backgrounds who grew up on the same block in Boerum Hill. It was named one of nine "Editor's Choice" books of the year by The New York Times and has been published in fifteen languages.

Lethem's second collection of short fiction, Men and Cartoons, was published in late 2004. In March 2005, The Disappointment Artist, his first collection of essays, was released. On September 20, 2005, Lethem received a MacArthur Fellowship.

In an interview with Armchair/Shotgun in 2009, Lethem said of short fiction:

I'm writing short stories right now, that's what I do between novels, and I love them. I'm very devoted to it. You know, it's funny. There seems to be some sort of law that you only get to be celebrated for one or the other. And then a couple of people will break it. Updike did. They didn't review his story collections by saying, "Well, these are nice, but he's a novelist." Or review his novels by saying, "Well, too bad he can't do the longer stuff." Other people tend to get patronized on one end or the other—and I'll take it. I have a very happy life as a novelist. But the story collections I've published are tremendously important to me. And many of the uncollected stories—or yet-to-be-collected stories—are among my proudest writings. They're very closely allied, obviously, to novel writing. But also very distinct, and, you know, there's no need to choose.

=== 2005–present ===
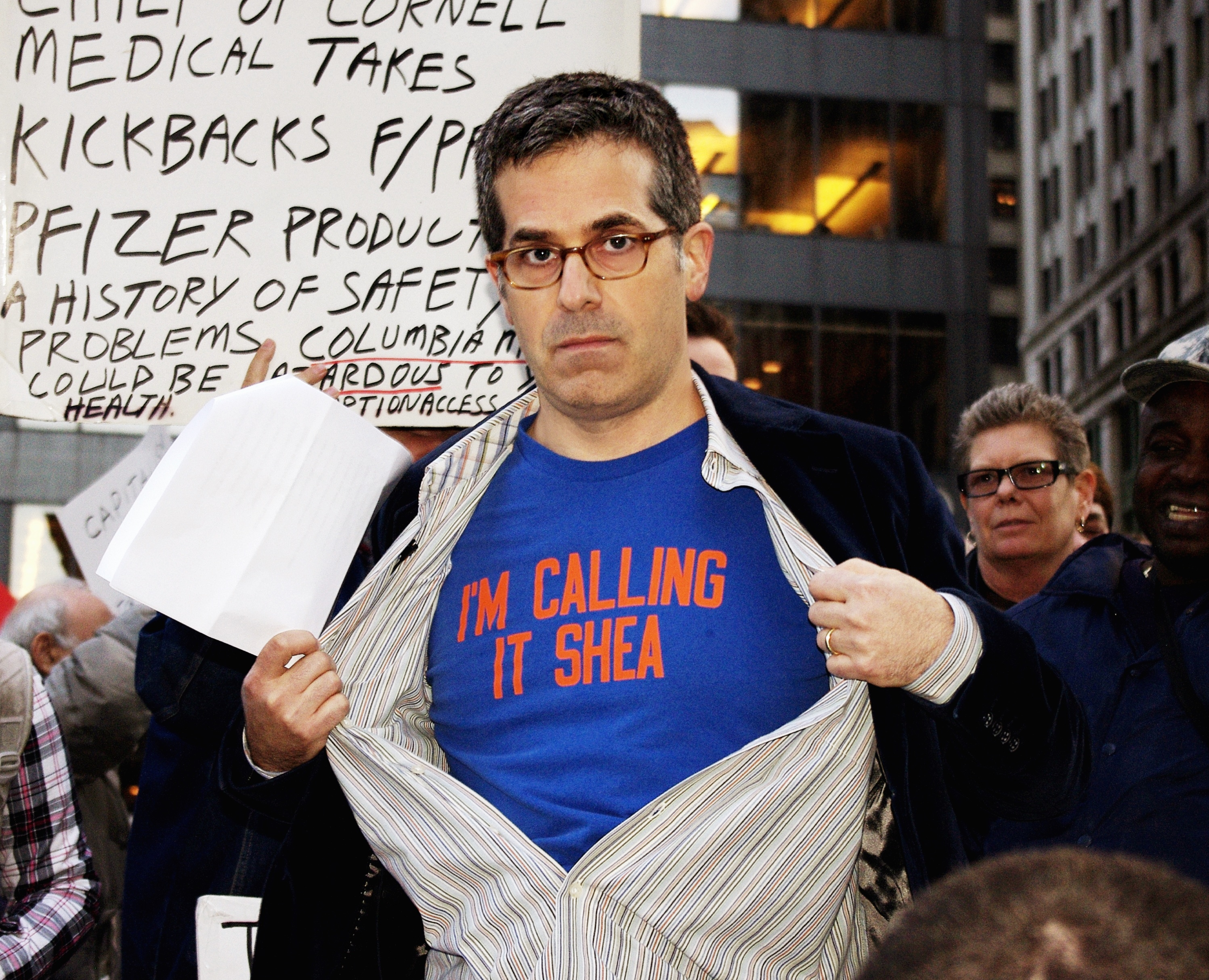
Lethem reading at Occupy Wall Street; his shirt refers to the New York Mets' home field changing from Shea Stadium, named after William Shea, to Citi Field, the naming rights for which were bought by Citibank

In September 2006, Lethem wrote the article "The Genius of Bob Dylan", a lengthy interview with Bob Dylan, which was published in Rolling Stone. The interview contained Lethem's reflections on Dylan's artistic achievements. It revealed Dylan's dissatisfaction with contemporary recording techniques and his thoughts on his own status.

After Motherless Brooklyn and The Fortress of Solitude, Lethem decided that "[i]t was time to leave Brooklyn in a literary sense anyway ... I really needed to defy all that stuff about place and memory." In 2007, he returned as a novelist to California, where some of his earlier fiction had been set, with You Don't Love Me Yet, a novel about an upstart rock band. The novel revolves around a woman in the band, Lucinda, who answers phones for her friend's complaint line and uses some of a caller's words as lyrics. According to Lethem, the book was inspired by the years he spent as the lead singer in an upstart California band in the late 1980s and early 1990s, during what he called "the unformed posturing phase of life". The novel takes its title from two (otherwise unconnected) songs of the same title by Roky Erickson and The Vulgar Boatmen. The original title was Monster Eyes, but Lethem was convinced to change it by his publisher. He later admitted to an interviewer that the association with the two songs "made it feel very lucky to me to put it on the book," and that even though the new title "isn't my phrase, for a book about appropriated language and the way things can be repurposed, it seemed okay. And, it's a beautifully passive-aggressive title." The novel received mixed reviews.

In 2005, Lethem had announced that he was planning to revive the Marvel Comics character Omega the Unknown in a ten-issue series to be published in 2006. After hearing of the project, Omega co-creator Steve Gerber expressed personal outrage over the use of the character without his participation, though he later discussed the project with Lethem and admitted that he had "misjudged" him. In May 2006, Marvel Editor-in-Chief Joe Quesada explained that the series had been delayed to 2007, saying that "winning the MacArthur Grant put additional and unexpected demands on [Lethem's] time." The revamped Omega the Unknown series was published in ten monthly issues from October 2007 to July 2008; the issues were published in a single volume in October 2008.

In early 2007, Lethem began work on Chronic City, which was published on October 13, 2009. In July 2008, Lethem said that Chronic City is "set on the Upper East Side of Manhattan, it's strongly influenced by Saul Bellow, Philip K. Dick, Charles G. Finney and Hitchcock's Vertigo and it concerns a circle of friends including a faded child-star actor, a cultural critic, a hack ghost-writer of autobiographies, and a city official. And it's long and strange."

His essay, "The Ecstasy of Influence: A Plagiarism" (2007), is a passionate defense of plagiarism and a call for a return to a "gift economy" in the arts. He writes,

The kernel, the soul—let us go further and say the substance, the bulk, the actual and valuable material of all human utterances—is plagiarism ... Don't pirate my editions; do plunder my visions. The name of the game is Give All. You, reader, are welcome to my stories. They were never mine in the first place, but I gave them to you.

The essay was included in his 2011 collection, The Ecstasy of Influence: Nonfictions, Etc.

In 2011, The Exegesis of Philip K. Dick, edited by Pamela Jackson and Lethem, was published by Houghton Mifflin Harcourt. Among other projects, Lethem published short books about John Carpenter's film They Live (published in October, 2010 as They Live) and the Talking Heads album Fear of Music. Starting in 2011, he served as the Roy E. Disney Professor in Creative Writing at Pomona College, a position formerly held by the late David Foster Wallace.

Lethem's ninth novel, entitled Dissident Gardens, was released on September 10, 2013. According to Lethem in an interview with the Los Angeles Times, the novel concerns "American leftists", very specifically "a red-diaper baby generation trying to figure out what it all means, this legacy of American Communism." Regarding the novel's setting, Lethem said in the same interview that it is

set in Queens and Greenwich Village, another New York neighborhood book, very much about the life of the city ... writing about Greenwich Village in 1958 was really a jump for me, it was as much of an imaginative leap as any of the more fantastical things I've done. But really exciting, too.

Dissident Gardens was quickly followed up in February 2015 with Lucky Alan and Other Stories, Lethem's fifth short story collection.

Lethem's tenth novel, A Gambler's Anatomy (or, alternatively, The Blot in the United Kingdom), published in October 2016, concerns "an international backgammon hustler who thinks he's psychic". After changing publishers from Doubleday to Ecco, Lethem followed A Gambler's Anatomy/The Blot with The Feral Detective in November 2018, Lethem's first foray back into the detective novel genre since the acclaimed Motherless Brooklyn.

Lethem's twelfth novel, The Arrest - an "utterly original postapocalyptic yarn about two siblings, the man that came between them, and a nuclear-powered super car," according to the publishers - was published in November 2020.

Lethem co-wrote six out of nine songs on the Lee Ranaldo album Electric Trim, released in 2017. He wrote the introduction to David Bowman's 2019 novel, Big Bang.

== Personal life ==
In 1987, Lethem married the writer and artist Shelley Jackson; they were divorced by 1997. In 2000, he married Julia Rosenberg, a Canadian film executive; they divorced two years later. As of 2007, Lethem lived in Brooklyn and Berwick, Maine, with his third wife, the filmmaker Amy Barrett. He has two sons.

== Bibliography ==
Jonathan Lethem talks about Chronic City on Bookbits radio.

=== Novels ===
- Gun, with Occasional Music (1994)
- Amnesia Moon (1995)
- As She Climbed Across the Table (1997)
- Girl in Landscape (1998)
- Motherless Brooklyn (1999)
- The Fortress of Solitude (2003)
- You Don't Love Me Yet (2007)
- Chronic City (2009)
- Dissident Gardens (2013)
- A Gambler's Anatomy (2016)
- The Feral Detective (2018)
- The Arrest (2020)
- Brooklyn Crime Novel (2023)

=== Short fiction ===
==== Novellas ====
- This Shape We're In (2000)

==== Short story collections ====
- The Wall of the Sky, the Wall of the Eye (1996)
- Kafka Americana (1999) (with Carter Scholz)
- Men and Cartoons (2004)
- How We Got Insipid (2006)
- Lucky Alan and Other Stories (2015)
- A Different Kind of Tension (2025)

=== Comics ===
- Omega the Unknown (2007)

==== Art Books ====
- Cellophane Bricks: A Life in Visual Culture (2024)

=== Non-fiction ===
- Lethem, Jonathan (January 6, 1997). "Monstrous Acts and Little Murders". Salon.com. Archived from the original on November 1, 2012.
- The Vintage Book of Amnesia (editor, 2001)
- Da Capo Best Music Writing: The Year's Finest Writing on Rock, Pop, Jazz, Country and More (editor, 2002)
- "You Don't Know Dick" (Bookforum essay, Summer 2002)
- The Disappointment Artist (2005)
- "The Beards" (The New Yorker February 28, 2005)
- Believeniks!: 2005: The Year We Wrote a Book About the Mets with Christopher Sorrentino, as "Ivan Felt and Harris Conklin" (2006)
- The Subway Chronicles (contributor, 2006)
- "Being James Brown" (Rolling Stone essay, June 2006)
- "The Genius of Bob Dylan" (Rolling Stone interview, September 2006)
- "The Ecstasy of Influence" (Harper's Magazine essay, February 2007)
- Brooklyn Was Mine (contributor, 2008)
- They Live (2010)
- The Ecstasy of Influence: Nonfictions, Etc. (2011)
- The Exegesis of Philip K. Dick (2011, co-editor with Pamela Jackson)
- Talking Heads' Fear Of Music (2012) (for 33⅓ series)
- Pettibon, Raymond; Lethem, Jonathan (March–April 2013). "Four paintings by Raymond Pettibon : a new collaboration". The Believer. 11 (3): 37–40.
- More Alive and Less Lonely: On Books and Writers (2018)

=== Film adaptations ===
- Light and the Sufferer (2009) – screenplay by Christopher Peditto based on a short story by Lethem
- The Epiphany (2011) – short film by SJ Chiro based on a short story by Lethem
- Motherless Brooklyn (2019) – screenplay by Edward Norton
