= Girl in Landscape =

1998 novel by Jonathan Lethem

- Author: Jonathan Lethem
- Language: English
- Genre: Science Fiction
- Publication place: United States
- English publication date: 1998
- Media type: Print (Hardback/Paperback)
- Pages: 280
- ISBN: 0-385-48518-2
- OCLC: 37489565
- Dewey Decimal: 813/.54 21
- LC Class: PS3562.E8544 G5 1998

Girl in Landscape is a science fiction novel by Jonathan Lethem, originally published as a 280-page hardback in 1998, by Doubleday Publishing Group. It is said to evoke the classic Western film The Searchers (1956).

== Plot summary ==
Pella Marsh is the only daughter and eldest child in a family that is leaving behind New York City, in a near-future where the Earth has sustained severe damage from climate change. Before they can leave, Caitlin, Pella's mother, dies of a brain tumour, leaving Clement, her ineffectual father, to try to care for Pella and her brothers, Raymond and David.

After twenty months of cryogenic suspended animation, the Marshs reach the Planet of the Archbuilders. This oceanless planet is inhabited by an advanced alien species known only as the Archbuilders, who are hermaphrodites. They built the complex and beautiful arch-like structures that dominate the terrain, terraformed their planet to provide a controlled climate, and used bioengineering to create several varieties of readily grown "potatoes" for a constant food supply. The Archbuilders themselves are furry and scaled creatures, with frond-like tentacles. There are also small, nearly invisible animals called "household deer," which inhabit most every corner of the region without much obvious impact. Despite their apparent lack of high technology, the Archbuilders are skilled communicators, and have twenty thousand indigenous languages on their world. They also rarely give birth, implying considerable longevity.

Like the other colonists, Pella is instructed to take acclimatisation pills, ostensibly to ward off indigenous Archbuilder viruses, but, because of her father's new plans for the humans in living with the world, she does not take them—much to the chagrin of the enigmatic resident Efram Nugent. After some time, rather like Ethan Edwards and Debbie in The Searchers (1956), Efram and Pella develop a love/hate relationship as she resists his misanthropic and speciesist attitudes toward both his fellow colonists and the Archbuilders.

After she has decided to stop acclimatisation, she discovers that she has a rapport with the Archbuilders, and becomes increasingly influenced by their culture, civilisation and ecology, "going native". Her brother David and fellow child Morris Grant are similarly affected, as is the infant Melissa Richmond-Concorse. The four of them discover that one side-effect of adaptation to their new environment allows them to inhabit the bodies of the household deer temporarily. Ultimately, other colonists either leave the planet (like the Kincaids, after a mistaken child sexual abuse incident); die, like Efram Nugent (shot); or become similarly absorbed by Archbuilder culture. The latter are transformed into semi-nomads who dwell in the ruins of their former houses, as apparent entropy consumes their abortive colony - like Pella, David, Morris, Raymond and Doug. As for the Archbuilders, Truth Renowned dies in the fire that destroys Hugh Merrow's abandoned house and art studio, and Hiding Kneel is injured after Efram imprisons it in a shed. However, their community survives as a cohesive group, belying human perceptions of their alleged weakness and 'decay' of their civilisation and culture.

== Characters ==
Human Colonists

- Pella Marsh: Thirteen. Central protagonist.
- Clement Marsh: Father. Thirty three. Former politician, failed to prevent Earth's ecological deterioration.
- Raymond Marsh: Ten. Pella's younger brother.
- David Marsh: Eight. Youngest member of Marsh family.
- Caitlin Marsh. Mother. Dies from brain tumor before she can travel to the Planet of the Archbuilders with her family.
- Joe Kincaid. Teacher.
- Ellen Kincaid. Baker.
- Bruce Kincaid. Thirteen.
- Martha Kincaid. Eight. Teases David mercilessly.
- Snider Grant: Alcoholic.
- Laney Grant: Alcoholic.
- Doug Grant: Fifteen. Itinerant.
- Morris Grant: Eight. Bullies David and Martha.
- Llana Richmond: Lesbian. Partner of Julie Concorse.
- Julie Concorse: Lesbian. Partner of Llana Richmond.
- Melissa Richmond-Concorse. One. Infant daughter of above.
- Efram Nugent: Misanthropic settlement leader.
- Ben Barth: Labourer and associate of Nugent.
- Diana Eastling: Biologist.
- E.G.Wa: Shopkeeper.
- Hugh Merrow: Artist.

Archbuilders

- Hiding Kneel
- Truth Renowned
- Lonely Dumptruck
- Gelatinous Stand
- Coral Dope
- Unimportant Lust
- Grinning Contrivance
- Notable Beast
- Specious Axiomatic
- Somber Fluid
