= Gun, with Occasional Music =

1994 novel by Jonathan Lethem

- First edition cover
- Author: Jonathan Lethem
- Cover artist: Jacket design by Michael Koelsch and Steven Cooley; Jacket illustration by Michael Koelsch
- Language: English
- Genre: Novel, hardboiled crime fiction, science fiction
- Publisher: Harcourt Brace & Co.
- Publication date: March 1994
- Publication place: United States
- Media type: Print (Hardcover & Paperback)
- Pages: 262 (1st edition, hardcover)
- ISBN: 0-15-136458-3 (1st edition, hardcover)
- OCLC: 28213412
- Dewey Decimal: 813/.54 20
- LC Class: PS3562.E8544 G86 1994

Gun, with Occasional Music is a 1994 novel by American writer Jonathan Lethem that blends science fiction and hardboiled detective fiction. The novel won Lethem the Locus Award for Best First Novel in 1995. It was also nominated for the Nebula Award for Best Novel in 1994 and the cover art, illustrated by pulp artist Michael Koelsch, was nominated for the Hugo Award for Best Original Art Work in 1995.

== Plot ==
The novel follows the adventures of Conrad Metcalf, a tough, smart-alecky private detective, through a futuristic version of San Francisco and Oakland, California. Metcalf is hired by a man who claims that he's being framed for the murder of a prominent urologist. Metcalf quickly discovers that nobody wants the case solved: not the victim's ex-wife, not the police, and certainly not the gun-toting kangaroo who works for the local mafia boss.

== Characters ==
- Conrad Metcalf – Hardboiled private "inquisitor".
- Maynard Stanhunt – Doctor who is murdered before the novel begins.
- Orton Angwine – Man accused of murdering Maynard Stanhunt.
- Delia Limetree – Woman who switched sexual nerve endings with Metcalf; mentioned only once.
- Theodore Twostrand – Scientist who invented evolution therapy.
- Celeste Stanhunt – Dr. Stanhunt's widow
- Sasha – Kitten whose brain has been accelerated by evolution therapy, known as an "evolved" kitten
- Grover Testafer – Doctor who shared a practice with Maynard Stanhunt
- Morgenlander – An inquisitor for "The Office"
- Kornfeld – An inquisitor for The Office
- Shand – Human clerk at the Vistamont Hotel
- Danny Phoneblum – A local gangster
- Joey Castle – An evolved kangaroo (and thug) employed by Phoneblum
- Pansy Greenleaf – Blanketrol-addicted woman with whom Celeste Stanhunt lives
- Dulcie – An evolved ewe employed by Testafer.
- Barry Greenleaf – An evolved child, otherwise known as a "babyhead"
- Catherine Teleprompter – An inquisitor for "The Office"
- Maker – Not a name, but a job title; scientist who makes "blends" of make at a makery
- Cole Bayzwaite – Architect
- Walter Surface – Private "inquisitor" and evolved ape.
- Nancy – Surface's companion
- Woofer – A baby-head
- Tweeter – A baby-head
- Overholt – Works for Phoneblum out of a bar called the Fickle Muse

== Major themes ==
In the novel, thanks to technology, children can become smarter and more cynical than adults; such children are known as baby-heads. "Baby-heads" have their own subculture and bars, and can drink alcohol. Animals, too, can be given the intelligence of a human being through bioscientific techniques, a concept explored previously by David Brin in his Uplift novels, Roger Zelazny in The Dream Master, and in Olaf Stapledon's Sirius. Lethem's animals stand midway between these two; like Brin's, they have clearly delineated and delimited rights; like Zelazny's, however, they are part of a darker symbolism. It is not considered bestiality when one has a sexual relationship with an evolved animal in this world, and humans may also adopt younger evolved animals.

Lethem also envisions nerve-swapping technology. Couples trade erogenous zones for the purpose of sexual experimentation. Metcalf previously underwent such a procedure, and is now trapped with a woman's neuro-sexual apparatus because his girlfriend skipped town with his male one.

There are other incidental touches. For an unexplained reason, psychology is no longer viewed as a science, and psychologists behave like Jehovah's Witnesses, The Church of Jesus Christ of Latter-day Saints and other itinerant proselytizing religions. One such couple asks Metcalf if he'd like to listen to selections from Sigmund Freud's Civilization and Its Discontents. In this future, television is now an abstract art form, and has abandoned linear narrative sequence genres.

In the novel's setting, asking questions is considered rude, making detectives (or "inquisitors", as they are known), whose job involves prying, social pariahs. Rather than broadcast bad news, the radio plays ominous music instead. (Handguns also come with threatening violin soundtracks.) Everyone is "on the make"—make being a snortable drug available in a dozen different blends (Acceptol, Avoidol, Forgettol) in stores called makeries. Substance abuse still exists: there is a lucrative black market in blanketrol, an earlier version of forgettol and addictol, but highly addictive. Pansy Greenleaf is initially addicted to it.

Karma is also subject to transactions through portable debit cards. Once someone's karma reaches zero, they are sentenced to specific periods of cryogenic respite until they "work off" their karmic "debt". Lethem went on to further explore this idea in his later novel Amnesia Moon, in which "luck ratings" served a similar role to Gun's karma. However, unscrupulous criminal elements in this society have developed "slaveboxes", neural implants which activate the inert central nervous systems of the sleepers, using their bodies for prostitution or slave labour while unconscious.

Metcalf himself is frozen late in the book. After six years, he is thawed out, only to find that memory retention has become a social taboo, and people now have prompters installed to provide retrospective commentary about past events in their lives. As a result, "makeries" only supply one standardized blend, with forgettol paramount. Private investigation is also illegal.

== Adaptations ==
As of January 2020, Legendary Entertainment was developing a series based on the novel.

== Release details ==
- 1994, U.S., Harcourt, ISBN 0-15-136458-3, Pub date 1 March 1994, Hardcover
- 1995, U.S., Tor, ISBN 0-312-85878-7, Pub date 1 March 1995, Paperback
- 2003, U.S., Harvest, ISBN 0-15-602897-2, Pub date 1 September 2003, Paperback

== Sources, references, external links, quotations ==
- Review of the novel by Steven Silver
- Drug References in Science Fiction

Specific
