= As She Climbed Across the Table =

1997 novel by Jonathan Lethem

- First edition cover
- Author: Jonathan Lethem
- Cover artist: Jacket design by David J. High
- Language: English
- Genre: Science fiction
- Publisher: Doubleday
- Publication date: February 17, 1997
- Publication place: United States
- Media type: Print (hardback & paperback)
- Pages: 212 (first edition, hardcover)
- ISBN: 0-385-48517-4 (first edition, hardcover)
- OCLC: 35145971
- Dewey Decimal: 813/.54 20
- LC Class: PS3562.E8544 A9 1997

As She Climbed Across the Table is a 1997 science fiction novel by the American writer Jonathan Lethem. It is a satirical story set on the fictional campus of Beauchamp University in Northern California. Particle physicist Alice Coombs rooms with narrator Philip Engstrand, an anthropologist researching conflicts between and within disciplines. Their relationship drives the romantic aspect of this story. The novel deals thematically with many of the philosophical issues pertaining to modern quantum physics, as well as human interaction with artificial intelligence.

== Plot ==
Lack is an emptiness created in a particle collider. Professor Soft theorized that the experiment would replicate the Big Bang and opened a wormhole to a microscopic universe and that this wormhole would close shortly after it was created, leaving the new universe attached to reality. The wormhole however is not accompanied by any events to indicate it is a physical object and so it is named Lack. Lack is characterized by its inexplicable preferences, as some particles and objects enter the space where Lack should be and fail to appear on the other side. Professor Alice Coombs is the first to discover that Lack only absorbs certain items. It takes her keys, but not a paperclip. Its only consistent property seems to be that, when Lack refuses an object once, it would forever refuse to consume that object.

The physicists in Coombs's lab become obsessed with Lack, which appears to have its own personality and preferences. Alice develops a personal relationship with the artificial intelligence that they have created, while Philip becomes jealous of their relationship.

Philip begins to get involved after B-84, a laboratory animal (cat) enters Lack. This consumption of B-84 causes a campus wide protest. In an attempt to impress Alice, Philip breaks up the protest by giving a speech about how a single cat being destroyed is minimal and their efforts would better spent on larger problems in the world. Instead of impressing Alice, she becomes defensive of Lack and locks herself in its chamber.

After a night of drinking, Philip comes back to his apartment to see that Dr. Soft has brought Alice there. She is asleep but Dr. Soft suspects that she may have tried to enter Lack and that she is no longer capable of running experiments on Lack. This causes Dr. Soft to divide Lack's time up among capable people. He does not want to interrupt Alice's research so he gives her time but asks Philip to monitor her. He also claims a portion of Lack's time for himself, his graduate students, and an Italian physics team headed by Carmo Braxia.

Despite all of the new people studying Lack, still very little progress is being made both on the grounds of explaining Lack and in restoring Philip and Alice's relationship. Undergraduate students build a device out of only things Lack consumes and try to feed it to Lack but Lack refuses it. Alice tries to give Lack pictures of herself but even those are refused. Even the Italian Physicist seems to be lost, that is until Braxia tells Philip his theory. He claims Lack is a new universe that doesn't have intelligent life. He says that because of the strong anthropic principle, a universe cannot exist if there isn't conscious life to observe it. Since Lack does not contain any conscious life it clings to our reality that does. The personality it developed was that of the first conscious person it encountered, Alice. What it absorbs is what she likes.

With his new knowledge, and in a state of drunkenness, Philip sets out to be the first lover in history to ever have a definitive answer as to whether or not he is loved back. He enters Lacks chamber and slides himself into Lack. He wakes up the next morning realizing he is no longer in the universe he was the night before. After retrieving B-84 as proof of the universe, Philip heads back to Lack and climbs in. However, instead of going back to reality as he expects, he enters a new universe that has no light. The universe is inhabited by Evan and Garth, two blind men who had also climbed into Lack. The two men help Philip climb into Lack once again. This time, instead of entering a new universe, he merges and becomes one with Lack. Alice, feeling that Philip and Lack are now one thing, attempts one last time to enter Lack.

== Characters ==
- Philip Engstrand: An anthropology professor at the University at Beauchamp who is known as the Dean of Interdiscipline for studying the relationships in academic environments. He strives to win back Alice's love after she becomes obsessed with Lack.
- Alice Coombs: A physicist who tries to understand Lack as an intelligent being instead of a physics experiment.
- Doctor Soft: Lack's creator. He allows Alice to take over research into Lack after she shows Lack has a preference for certain particles which he thought was impossible.
- Garth Poys: A blind man who has blindsight. This allows him to get past the observer problem.
- Evan Robar: Garth's friend who is also blind but amaurotic.
- Carmo Braxia: An Italian physicist who is interested in studying the physics behind Lack. He is the one who finally cracks the mystery.
- Cynthia Jalter: A therapist who studies coupling. She gets to know Philip through Evan and Garth whose relationship she is studying. She tries to help Philip understand that Alice no longer gives him the attention he needs because of lack and that she is bad for him.
- Georges De Tooth: A professor that Philip convinces to research Lack by treating it as a self-contained text.

== Reception ==
Reviewers considered the book a light read that was entertaining. Steven E. Alford says "It embodies a distilled, gentle, silly look at the world". Another common agreement is that Lethem defies the boundaries in traditional genres. Glen Engel-Cox points out that instead of like a traditional science fiction, focusing on a "driven scientist in that endless pursuit of knowledge", As She Climbed Across the Table focuses on "someone like us [a science fiction reader], intrigued by the type but not one of them himself." It received some criticism for inaccuracies in scientific principles. Eric Weeks compares it to The Tao of Physics with its "muddled attempts to be philosophical about quantum mechanics which fail to get the physics correct." He also talks about how it contains bad physics jokes that he finds distracting.

== Film adaptation ==
On June 23, 2010, David Cronenberg is set to direct the film adaptation of the novel. On November 12, 2020, Michel Gondry is set to direct the film adaptation with Joe Penhall writing the script for Amazon Studios.
