= Chronic City =

2009 novel by Jonathan Lethem

- Author: Jonathan Lethem
- Language: English
- Publisher: Doubleday
- Publication date: October 13, 2009
- Publication place: United States
- Media type: Print (hardcover)
- Pages: 528 pp
- ISBN: 0-385-51863-3
- OCLC: 429934462

Jonathan Lethem talks about Chronic City on Bookbits radio.

Chronic City (2009) is a novel by American author Jonathan Lethem.

== Summary ==
Lethem began work on Chronic City in early 2007, and has said that the novel is "set on the Upper East Side of Manhattan, it's strongly influenced by Saul Bellow, Philip K. Dick, Charles Finney and Hitchcock's Vertigo, and it concerns a circle of friends including a faded child-star actor, a cultural critic, a hack ghost-writer of autobiographies, and a city official."

== Plot outline ==
The novel begins with Chase Insteadman, a former child actor whose career seems to be over, accidentally meeting Perkus Tooth, a once-promising critic now barely surviving by writing liner notes for CDs and DVDs at the office space of The Criterion Collection, and Perkus is eager to expose Chase to a self-contained universe of pop culture esoterica. Perkus has unconventional opinions on almost everything, especially Marlon Brando, and is glad to express them; Chase contents himself with listening to his new friend. Much of the first part of the novel is pivoted upon Perkus' speeches and Chase's thoughts about them. In this part of the novel readers also meet Perkus' friends: Oona Laszlo, a ghost-writer of autobiographies, and presently that of high-profile sculptor Laird Noteless, whose "dystopian" public art exhibits are hinted to actually be disaster sites; Richard Abneg, a former squatter, now working for the powerful NYC mayor, Jules Arnheim (who seems to be a fictional portrait of Michael Bloomberg); Biller, a black hobo who unexpectedly turns Internet wizard; and Georgina Hawkmanaji, often referred to as the ostrich-woman, a Turk heiress to "twenty million or so of inherited Armenian plunder."

Strange things happen in the NYC depicted in the novel; a mysterious tiger randomly destroys buildings and underground stations; a grey fog envelops Manhattan's Downtown; people are fascinated by mysterious chaldrons, gorgeous vases that are only seen in pictures, because nobody seems to have ever seen the originals; people keep asking Chase about his fiancée, Janice Trumbull, stranded on the orbital space station, even though he cannot remember anything of the woman but her letters. On the other hand, nothing really important seems to happen in the plot, with the characters living their ordinary lives, unconventional as they may be. But then the tiger strikes Perkus' favorite hamburger joint, and damages the building he lives in; this suddenly turns him into a hobo, and sets in motion a chain of events which will bring the novel to its conclusion—and to several final revelations.

== Honors ==
Chronic City was named to The New York Times 10 best books of the year list for 2009.
