= Jerry Weldon =

Musical jazz saxophonist (born 1957)

- Born: Gerard Joseph Weldon; September 27, 1957 (age 68); New York City, U.S.
- Genres: Jazz; be-bop
- Occupation: Musician
- Instrument: Tenor saxophone
- Years active: 1981–present
- Website: Website

Jerry Weldon (born September 27, 1957) is an American tenor saxophonist, noted for his involvement in various groups such as Lionel Hampton Orchestra and Harry Connick, Jr.'s big band. He is seen as a "veteran" of the New York jazz scene.

== Career ==
Weldon graduated from the Rutgers University Jazz Program in 1981 and joined the Lionel Hampton Orchestra. He worked with Hampton until he died in 2002. He subsequently worked with organist Jack McDuff & his "Heatin' System" band. Additionally Jerry has worked with organists Jimmy McGriff, Joey DeFrancesco, Bobby Forrester, Dr. Lonnie Smith, and Mel Rhyne, trombonist Al Grey, piano players George Cables and Cedar Walton, drummers Roy Haynes and Jimmy Cobb as well as guitarist/singer George Benson, guitarist Earl Klugh, bassist Keter Betts, singer Mel Tormé and a host of other legendary musicians.

In 1990, Weldon became a charter member and featured soloist with Harry Connick Jr.'s newly formed big band. Since then, he has toured with Connick, and was also part of his Broadway musical production, Thou Shalt Not. From 2016 to 2018, he was a member of the “house band" on HARRY, Connick’s daytime television variety show. In addition to Weldon's work with Connick, he performs regularly as a leader of his own groups in New York City and tours throughout the U.S. and Europe.

== Personal life ==
Weldon is married to author Virginia DeBerry.

== Discography ==
- Midtown Blues (Amosaya, 1998)
- 3 O'Clock in the Morning: Live at Smoke (Dex Jazz, 2006)
- Well Done! (Recorded Live at Smoke) (Dex Jazz, 2008)
- Don't Look Back (Index Jazz, 2010)
- On the Move! (Doodlin', 2016)
- Those Were the Days (Cellar Music Group, 2018)
- Cory Weeds Meets Jerry Weldon (Cellar Music Group, 2025)
- The Summit (Cellar Music Group, 2025)

== Collaborations ==
- Five by Five with Bobby Forrester (Cats Paw, 1994)
- The Second Time Around with Bobby Forrester (Cats Paw, 1995)
- Head to Head with Michael Karn (Criss Cross, 1998)
- What's New with Massimo Faraò (Venus, 2017)
- We're Rollin' with Hammond Groovers (Nuccia, 2017)
- Massimo Faraò Trio Meets Jerry Weldon (Racing Jazz, 2020)

== With the N.Y. Hardbop Quintet ==
- The Clincher (TCB, 1995)
- Rokermotion (TCB, 1996)
- A Whisper Away (TCB, 1998)
- A Mere Bag Of Shells (TCB, 2000)

== As sideman ==
- Post No Bills (Joe Ascione, 1996)
- Remembering Blakey: A Tribute to Art Blakey (Ron Aprea, 2012)
- Bass, Buddies & Blues (Keter Betts, 1998)
- Bass, Buddies, Blues & Beauty Too (Keter Betts, 1999)
- Live at the East Coast Jazz Festival (Keter Betts, 2000)
- The Dreamer in Me: Live at Dizzy's Club Coca-Cola (Freddy Cole, 2009)
- Blue Light, Red Light (Harry Connick, Jr. 1991)
- When My Heart Finds Christmas (Harry Connick, Jr., 1993)
- Star Turtle (Harry Connick, Jr., 1995)
- Come By Me (Harry Connick, Jr., 1999)
- Songs I Heard (Harry Connick, Jr., 2001)
- Harry for the Holidays (Harry Connick, Jr., 2003)
- Only You (Harry Connick, Jr., 2004)
- Oh, My Nola (Harry Connick, Jr., 2007)
- Your Songs (Harry Connick, Jr., 2009)
- In Concert on Broadway (Harry Connick, Jr., 2011)
- Smokey Mary (Harry Connick, Jr., 2013)
- That Would Be Me (Harry Connick, Jr. 2015)
- True Love: A Celebration of Cole Porter (Harry Connick, Jr. 2019)
- Joey D! (Joey DeFrancesco, 2008)
- Big Shot (Papa John DeFrancesco, 2009)
- What Time Is It? (Giacomo Gates, 2017)
- Sentimental Journey (Lionel Hampton, 1985)
- For the Love of Music (Lionel Hampton, 1995)
- 90th Birthday Celebration (Lionel Hampton, 2003)
- Greasy Street (Richie Hart, 2005)
- My Little French Dancer (Diane Hoffman, 2006)
- Write On, Capt'n (Jack McDuff, 1993)
- The Heatin' System (Jack McDuff, 1994)
- That's the Way I Feel About It (Jack McDuff, 1996)
- Bringin' It Home (Jack McDuff, 1998)
- Brotherly Love (Jack McDuff, 2001)
- Endangered Species (David Schumacher, 2005)
- Oriental Express (Akiko Tsuruga, 2009)
- Sakura (Akiko Tsuruga, 2012)
