= Motherless Brooklyn (novel) =

1999 novel by Jonathan Lethem

- Author: Jonathan Lethem
- Language: English
- Genre: Detective novel
- Publisher: Doubleday
- Publication date: 1999
- Publication place: United States
- Media type: Print
- ISBN: 0-385-49183-2
- OCLC: 40723751
- Dewey Decimal: 813.54 21
- LC Class: PS3562.E8544 M68 1999

Motherless Brooklyn is a novel by Jonathan Lethem that was first published in 1999. Told in first person, the story follows Lionel Essrog, a private investigator who has Tourette's, a disorder marked by involuntary tics. Essrog works for Frank Minna, a small-time owner of a "seedy and makeshift" detective agency disguised as a transportation company. Together, Essrog and three other characters who are all orphans from Brooklyn—Tony, Danny, and Gilbert—call themselves "the Minna Men". The novel was adapted into a 2019 film.

== Critical reception ==
The novel won the 1999 National Book Critics Circle Award for fiction and the 2000 Gold Dagger award for crime fiction.

Albert Mobilio of The New York Times wrote:

Under the guise of a detective novel, Lethem has written a more piercing tale of investigation, one revealing how the mind drives on its own "wheels within wheels." Unlike the stock detective novel it shadows, the thriller in which clarity emerges on the final page, Motherless Brooklyn immerses us in the mind's dense thicket, a place where words split and twine in an ever-deepening tangle.

Gary Krist of Salon wrote:

Motherless Brooklyn has a few problems—including some cartoon-like stock characters and one scene near the end that flirts with maudlin sentimentality—but it works far better than the average hip postmodern novel in terms of sheer emotional impact. Because Lethem never lets the metaphorical and linguistic possibilities of his narrator's illness overshadow his immensely appealing humanity, we really care about Lionel and his search for his mentor's killer.

== Film adaptation ==
Actor and filmmaker Edward Norton acquired the film rights almost immediately after the book was published, but production started only in February 2018. Norton wrote, produced, directed, and starred together with Willem Dafoe, Bruce Willis, Gugu Mbatha-Raw, and Alec Baldwin. The film differs significantly from the book. Regarding the transposition of the story from the book's contemporary time to the fifties, and Lethem's very literal interpretation of neo-noir characters, Lethem said that "the alchemical quality of the written word makes it okay. But if you start photographing that, it's going to look like Halloween, like they're dressing up".

The film had its world premiere at the Telluride Film Festival on 30 August 2019 and was released in theaters on November 1, 2019.

The film was not successful at the box office, with Slate's Marissa Martinelli summarizing that "Norton's film often feels less like an adaptation and more like a work of fan fiction 20 years in the making, with Norton borrowing Lethem's protagonist and the broad strokes of his plot to create something almost entirely new".
