= The Fortress of Solitude (novel) =

2003 novel by Jonathan Lethem

- First edition cover
- Author: Jonathan Lethem
- Cover artist: Jacket design by Marc Cozza; Jacket illustration by Rebecca Cohen
- Language: English
- Genre: Novel
- Publisher: Doubleday
- Publication date: September 16, 2003
- Publication place: United States
- Media type: Print (hardcover & paperback), audio cassette, audio CD, and audio download
- Pages: 511 pp (first edition, hardcover)
- ISBN: 0-385-50069-6 (first edition, hardcover)
- OCLC: 51629829
- Dewey Decimal: 813/.54 21
- LC Class: PS3562.E8544 F67 2003

The Fortress of Solitude is a 2003 semi-autobiographical novel by Jonathan Lethem set in Brooklyn and spanning the 1970s, '80s, and '90s. It follows two teenage friends, Dylan Ebdus and Mingus Rude, one white and one black, who discover a magic ring. The novel explores the issues of race and culture, gentrification, self-discovery, and music. The novel's title is a reference to the Fortress of Solitude, a fortress constructed for Superman.

== Plot ==
Dylan Ebdus is a young Jewish boy growing up in Boerum Hill, Brooklyn with his father Abraham and mother Rachel. Abraham is a solitary man who spends most of his time working on his experimental film. Rachel abandons the family when Dylan is young, sending occasional cryptic postcards.

Dylan spends his childhood playing games on the street with the neighbourhood children. Robert Woolfolk, a local boy, bullies Dylan and steals his bike. Dylan's closest friend is Mingus Rude, a mixed-race boy and the son of Barrett Rude Jr., a once-famous soul singer. Dylan and Mingus remain close over the years but their relationship is strained. They often hang out as a trio with Arthur Lomb, who shares their love of comic books. Mingus and Dylan encounter a homeless man, Aaron X. Doily, whose ring they believe to be magical. They use the ring to fly around, place graffiti and partake in vigilante justice as 'Aeroman', a moniker first created by Dylan but taken up by Mingus, who is able to fly more deftly than Dylan can. They swap the ring with each other and have equal ownership of it.

As Dylan and Mingus grow older, Barrett Rude Jr. develops a cocaine habit and his father Senior moves into their house. Soon after Mingus's eighteenth birthday there is a heated argument involving Mingus, Barrett and Senior. Dylan is present, and sees Mingus killing Senior. Mingus is sent to prison on manslaughter charges. Dylan goes to Camden (an alias for Bennington College), a college in Vermont mainly populated by the rich and privileged. Dylan feels out of place there. He invites Arthur Lomb to stay for a week, and the two deal drugs together around campus. Dylan is soon made to leave Camden.

Some time passes. Dylan has become a music critic and meets with Hollywood producers to pitch film ideas. He has a long-time girlfriend, Abby, who dumps him. He often thinks of his childhood and retains keepsakes (including the ring and Mingus's hair pick) from the time. Dylan returns to Boerum Hill to find that it has been gentrified. He hears from his father that Mingus has donated an organ to Barrett Rude Jr., and visits the prison to see him. Dylan hopes to give Mingus the ring as well as money, but Mingus tells him to give it all to Robert Woolfolk, who is in there with him.

Dylan does as Mingus says begrudgingly and gives the ring and money to Robert, helping him to escape. He later hears from a police officer that Robert died jumping from the prison in what is being called a suicide - it's clear that Robert was trying to fly away, but did not succeed. Dylan recalls a memory from when his father drove him to Camden and back to retrieve his belongings after he was kicked out. In the memory, Dylan puts a Brian Eno record on in the car as they drive, and wonders if his father feels the same emotions as he does listening to it.

== Characters ==
Dylan Ebdus – the son of Rachel and Abraham, an artist father and a Brooklyn native mother. He has a hard time adjusting to the neighborhood until he meets Mingus Rude. As time passes on, they grow apart. Dylan goes to Camden College in Vermont, while Mingus goes to prison in Brooklyn. Dylan attempts to find and rescue his friend and restore their relationship.

Abraham Ebdus – Dylan's father, an avant-garde artist. After Rachel abandons the family, he becomes more introverted, shutting himself in the attic to paint cels of his animated film, a masterpiece that will never be complete. In order to support himself and Dylan, he turns to painting garish science fiction book covers, a field in which he eventually becomes prominent. His relationship with Dylan is strained.

Barrett Rude Jr. – former lead singer of a 1960s, moderately successful soul group called The Subtle Distinctions. He had a number of hits at that time, some of which were sampled by current artists. More importantly, he is Mingus's father, and a musical icon for Dylan. Throughout the novel, he struggles with cocaine addiction.

Arthur Lomb – Dylan's only white friend during his elementary and middle school years. Arthur persuades Dylan to apply to Stuyvesant, a public high school, but Dylan is accepted and Arthur is not. The two follow different paths throughout the novel: Dylan goes on to college and eventually California, and Arthur stays in Brooklyn and assumes the role of Mingus's right-hand man, participating in drug deals and graffiti. When Dylan visits Arthur at the end of the novel, Arthur is a landlord and has opened a chic bistro, adding to the general gentrification of the area.

Robert Woolfolk – nicknamed "Willfuck" by Henry, Robert plays the role of Dylan's arch enemy who has the knack of showing up at the worst possible times. Over the course of the novel, he trashes Dylan's first bike, yokes him repeatedly, and holds him at gun point during a drug robbery. Robert ends up in prison with Mingus. When Dylan visits the two in prison, Mingus persuades him to offer the ring to Robert to help Robert escape. However, Robert's attempt at a flight escape ends in his demise.

Mingus Rude – son of Barrett Rude Jr. and childhood friend of Dylan Ebdus. One of the most prominent characters in the novel. He moves to Dean Street after Dylan does, and the two quickly become friends. Their friendship evolves over the course of the first part of the novel.

Rachel Ebdus – mother of Dylan Ebdus and is a character of the book who, in the beginning is mentioned very little, but is a big part of Dylan Ebdus's world.

== Literary style ==
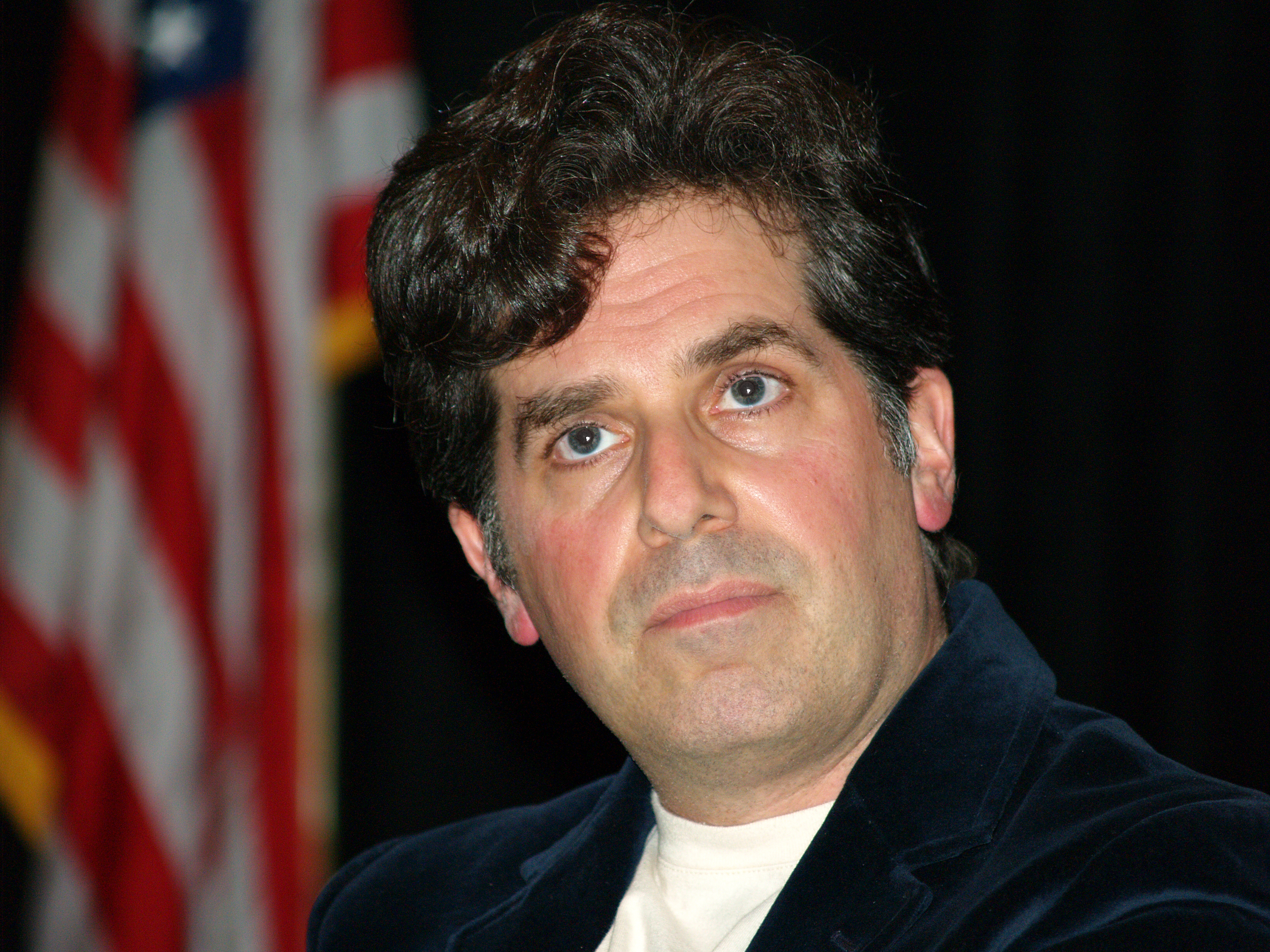
Jonathan Lethem in 2007

Stylistically, the two main parts of the novel are written as a) a third-person narrative ("Underberg" - part one) and b) a first-person narrative ("Prisonaires" - part three) with distinctive dialogue, though toward the very end of the book dialogue-intensive scenes and the brief entry of "Liner Notes" (part two) by Dylan are introduced to mirror his alienation from society. Since the work covers Dylan's life from the time he was a child to his growing independence and moral detachment from Brooklyn as a young man, the style of the work progresses through each of its thirty-four chapters, with the complexity of language gradually increasing. However, throughout the work, slang and music are used to portray indirectly the state of mind of the protagonist, and the subjective impact of the events of his life. Through the use of these sly literary devices Lethem intends to capture the subjective experience through music, rather than to present the actual experience through prose narrative.

== Awards and nominations ==
The Fortress of Solitude was nominated for the 2005 International Dublin Literary Award.

== Adaptations ==
A musical adaption conceived of and directed by Daniel Aukin with music and lyrics by Michael Friedman and book by Itamar Moses was produced by New York Stage and Film and Vassar College's Powerhouse Theatre in the summer of 2012. It received an Off-Broadway production by New York Public Works in 2015.

The world's premiere of the stage version was on March 13, 2014, at the Dallas Theater Center.

== Publication history ==
2003, United States, Doubleday ISBN 0-385-50069-6, pub date 16 September 2003, hardcover
