= Jim DeBerry =

Executive and comedian

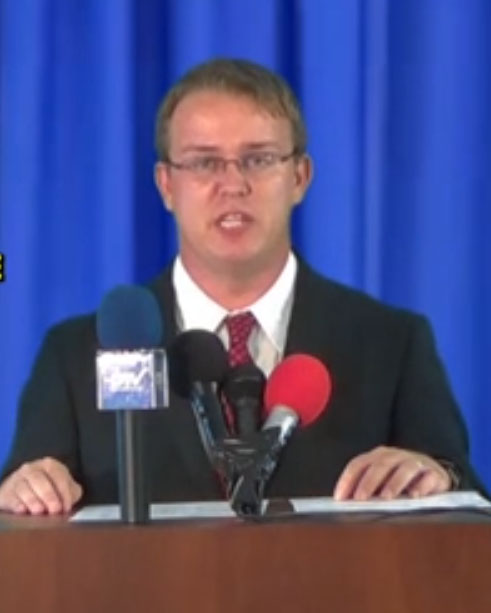
- Jim DeBerry speaking a press conference about Mr. Wong Fong Shu
- Born: July 13, 1977 (age 49); Detroit, Michigan, U.S.
- Occupations: Entrepreneur, Television, Film, Radio
- Years active: 1995–present
- Style: Observational comedy, Improvisational comedy, Character actor, Insult comedy

Jim DeBerry (born July 13, 1977) is an American entrepreneur, actor, comedian and radio personality, and has been a C-level executive for several home services and entertainment companies.

== Early life ==
Born in Detroit, Michigan, DeBerry's family relocated to Central Florida in the 1980s. DeBerry participated in an Early College/Dual Enrollment program where he earned an associate degree in arts from Seminole State College and later attended the University of Central Florida and Florida International University. His father, Jim DeBerry, Sr. is a retired businessman and his mother, Linda DeBerry, was a homemaker. His father is French and Norwegian while his mother was of Irish and Yorkshire descent which provided a culturally diverse upbringing. DeBerry is married to Amy DeBerry, an actress who has been appeared in Walmart television advertisements and as Ditzy Misty for Definitive Television.

== Swimming pool and solar industries ==
At the Miami Beach, Florida, based Pool Service America, DeBerry was general manager and company qualifier for one of the largest swimming pool companies in America in 2008.

DeBerry was featured in the Hanley Wood publication Pool and Spa News for his philanthropy work with programs such a USO and Make a Splash Foundation by making charitable contributions in his customers' names. In 2010, DeBerry obtained the profession's highest possible license from the Florida Department of Business and Professional Regulation. Aqua magazine covered DeBerry in a featured spread related to his technical expertise on suction side and pressure side cleaners and why industry workers should not be concerned with robotic machines taking their jobs.

In 2011, while managing partner for Orlando-based Aqua Pool Dealer, DeBerry was featured in marketing campaigns for radio, television and internet promotions. On September 26, 2011, DeBerry's appearance on WTKS 104.1 FM's The Buckethead Show, host Jason Bailey spoke to DeBerry regarding career opportunities and did a comedy bit in the segment with DeBerry about pool owners in the nude by their swimming pools. At the 2011 American Pool and Spa Professionals' International Pool and Spa Expo Award Show in Las Vegas, DeBerry was awarded with the Industry's Achievement Award.

In 2012, DeBerry advocated for homeowners related to the Florida Energy and Conservation Code possible burden upon home owners and energy savings, in which DeBerry gave multiple solutions to combat federal guidance regulations used by the U.S. Equal Employment Opportunity Commission (EEOC) related to changes regarding criminal background checks. DeBerry was sought after as an industry leader with experience working with investors related to REO properties' downfalls and how to turn those opportunities into revenue. According to the Annual State of the Industry edition ofPool and Spa News, DeBerry is one of the most followed on Twitter with over 90,000 followers including over 500 verified celebrities. DeBerry was covered by Aqua magazine on how to turn social media into clients which included Twitter conversations between DeBerry and an English writer of the Liverpool Daily Post, Gary Bainbridge. In December 2012, the Orlando Business Journal awarded DeBerry for running the top outstanding business in the region with Aqua Pool Dealer. Employment growth and ability to increase revenue had been a deciding factor for DeBerry winning the award. While head of a solar firm in Sanford, Florida, DeBerry offered experience to the industry regarding concerns of employee defections and how to deal in a competitive environment related to employment agreements and non-disclosures. In 2015, under DeBerry's direction, Wild Waters added new attractions to the amusement park related to eco-tourism including the educational animal exhibit featuring snakes, turtles and alligators, Henry Flagler's Boat of Bounce and a comedy lab. DeBerry was noted for implementing the water park's "save, sanitize, filtrate and recirculate" and recycling programs minimizing the amount of water used per month from the City of Ocala's supply.

== Entertainment career ==
=== Radio ===
DeBerry co-hosted The Unfunny Serious Show with the radio personality Robin Nathan Hood on 1400 AM WTRR, owned by J&V Communications from 1999 to 2002. The program featured various musical guests, actors and comedy, most notably Bruce Willis and Michael Winslow. The radio show was cancelled in 2002 with The Supervillains being the last live in-studio performance. The Unfunny Serious Show released a 10-year anniversary album called The Best and The Worst of The Unfunny Serious Show. It was announced on the Caiden Cowger Show that the album would be released on CD and on iTunes in 2013 and would include characters played by DeBerry. In particular, the album would have recordings of the characters of "Tommy the Jobless Hobo" who is depicted as a black homeless man and a transsexual named Michelle looking for a limousine.

=== Performance characters ===
DeBerry has performed in character as a comedic chef, a police officer named Officer Billy Doofus, an Asian named Mr. Wong Fong Shu, and a cowboy-like southerner named Rowdy Roscoe. These characters have been used at conventions, fairs, festivals, public appearances and for television commercials. DeBerry as the cowboy character was mentioned by Marc Mero and callers on the Monsters in the Morning radio show regarding the time he shot confetti out of an air cannon into Larry Zbyszko's coffee at a celebrity bowling event. DeBerry's characters have been described by several news outlets as caricatures.

As the vice president of the television production company, Definitive Television, DeBerry was featured in a TV commercial in Alabama that went viral. During the commercial, DeBerry wore Asian garb and glasses that simulated closed, slanted eyes as the Mr. Wong Shu character. The commercial featured DeBerry as Mr. Wong Fong Shu telling viewers to contact a personal injury law firm known as McCutcheon and Hamner, implying the law firm could assist them against insurance companies. A blog from Angry Asian Man stated that DeBerry was racist. Other news outlets such as Above the Law took a similar position, while others came to DeBerry's defense such as radio host Kidd Chris stating that DeBerry's character was not racist. DeBerry has been covered by E! network's The Soup, Time, Salon, as well as the writer Brian Cuban and other journalists who outlined the comedic racial undertones that the commercial presented. DeBerry's character of Mr. Wong Fong Shu was also compared to the Wayne brothers' movie White Chicks and Mickey Rooney's portrayal of I.Y. Yunioshi in the 1961 film version of Breakfast at Tiffany's. The Raw Story and ABA Journal reported a dispute between MDeBerry and the attorney firm over the Mr. Wong Fong Shu attorney commercial. DeBerry stated he never received an order to cease and desist with removal in which DeBerry offered to provide documents showing the purchase of its production. A mock press conference was held by DeBerry as himself and in the Mr. Wong Fong Shu character regarding documents challenging the attorney firm claims. DeBerry disclosed that the coverage from the Mr. Wong Shu lawyer commercial increased revenue and profits.

=== Music ===
DeBerry is a songwriter and musician who plays the bass guitar. He said during a radio interview with the 91.5 FM WPRK disc jockey Keith Mercer that he preferred a Fender American Standard Precision Bass guitar before switching to Washburn jazz bass guitars. DeBerry prefers to use the musical composition tone called semi-tone tuning style. DeBerry's early music was described as punk rock and his later music with the band A King's Ransom in particular the single "Sunny", compared DeBerry's writing style to the Christian musician Jeremy Camp. Tyler Gray, of the Orlando Sentinel, covered DeBerry for having run the third largest concert venue in Orlando next to the House of Blues and the Hard Rock live. DeBerry was noted for booking entertainers such as Heart, Ratt, Stone Cold Steve Austin, and members of N'Sync. In 2013, Deberry's independent music label, Debar Recordings, a division of Debar Holdings, officially signed the MMA fight music producer, Mikey Rukus, to a recording contract with international distribution. DeBerry negotiated a licensing deal to have Rukus' music on the NBCSN for World Series of Fighting events.
