= Amnesia Moon =

1995 novel by Jonathan Lethem

- First edition cover
- Author: Jonathan Lethem
- Cover artist: Jacket design by Alexander Munn and Steven Cooley; Jacket illustration by Alexander Munn
- Language: English
- Genre: Science fiction novel
- Publisher: Harcourt Brace & Co.
- Publication date: September 1995
- Publication place: United States
- Media type: Print (Hardcover & Paperback)
- Pages: 247 pp (first edition, hardcover)
- ISBN: 0-15-100091-3 (first edition, hardcover)
- OCLC: 32012520
- Dewey Decimal: 813/.54 20
- LC Class: PS3562.E8544 A8 1995

Amnesia Moon is a 1995 novel by Jonathan Lethem. Lethem adapted the novel from several unpublished short stories he had written, all about catastrophic, apocalyptic events. When Tor Books published the second edition in 1996, they commissioned Michael Koelsch to illustrate a new cover art; Koelsch had previously illustrated Lethem's previous book cover art Gun, with Occasional Music.

== Plot ==
The protagonist is a survivalist named Chaos, who lives in an abandoned megaplex in Wyoming after an apparent nuclear strike. The residents of his town of Hatfork are reliant on a sinister messianic figure named Kellogg for food. Kellogg also has powerful dreams, which he transfers into the minds of others. Chaos's mind is especially receptive, making him reluctant to sleep.

Both Lethem and Chaos abandon this premise early on, and Chaos also goes by the name of "Everett Moon", depending on where he is. The novel plays with several other dystopian and post-apocalyptic setups. One area is covered in a thick green fog, save for an exclusive private school. Vacaville, California, has converted to a luck-based social system, taken to totalitarian extremes.

Amnesia Moon bears homage to Philip K. Dick. During a party, one guest describes a battle of wills in West Marin, and another cites a West Marin inhabitant named "Hoppington", both references to Dick's Dr. Bloodmoney, or How We Got Along After the Bomb. Vacaville is reminiscent of Dick's Solar Lottery, where society is also based on chance. When Moon and Melinda reach San Francisco, hallucinogenic drugs play a role in altered perceptions that provide access to other characters in this world, as in The Three Stigmata of Palmer Eldritch. Elsewhere, it is argued that the depicted realities splintered away from each other to provide resistance to a hive-like alien invasion of Earth. Such solipsistic worlds are reminiscent of Dick's early novel Eye in the Sky.

== Secondary bibliography ==
- Rossi, Umberto. "From Dick to Lethem: The Dickian Legacy, Postmodernism, and Avant-Pop in Jonathan Lethem's Amnesia Moon", Science-Fiction Studies # 86, 29:1, March 2002, 15-33.

== See also ==
- Simulated reality
