= Virginia DeBerry and Donna Grant =

Virginia DeBerry and Donna Grant are American authors who co-wrote several literary works between 1990 and 2010.

== Biography ==
DeBerry and Grant first met in New York as plus size models vying for the same assignments. Together, they launched Maxima magazine, a fashion and lifestyle magazine for plus-size women, where DeBerry was editor-in-chief and Grant the managing editor. When publication of Maxima ceased, they tried writing a book together. Their first novel, Exposures, was published under the pseudonym Marie Joyce (for Donna Marie and Virginia Joyce). Their second book, written as DeBerry and Grant, was Tryin' to Sleep in the Bed You Made which spent 18 months on the Essence Magazine Bestseller list and 5 months as number 1 on that list. The authors received the 1998 Honor Award in Fiction from the Black Caucus of the American Library Association. The novel also received the Book of the Year award from Blackboard, and the New Author of the Year Award from the Go On Girl Book Club. Their next novel, Far From the Tree, was a New York Times Bestseller as well as an Essence Magazine Bestseller and Better Than I Know Myself received two Open Book Awards, and was included on the Best African-American fiction of 2004 lists of both Borders and Waldenbooks.

Grant attended Barnard College and is a graduate of New York University. She is a Brooklyn, New York native and currently lives in the borough with her husband Hiram. Before becoming a novelist, she spent more than a decade as a plus size model, represented by the 12+ division of Ford Models.

DeBerry is a former high school English teacher from Buffalo, New York. She attended Fisk University and is a graduate of SUNY at Buffalo. She is married to jazz tenor saxophonist Jerry Weldon and lives in New Jersey.

In 2008, DeBerry and Grant joined with partners Tyrha Lindsey and Tracey Kemble to form 4 Colored Girls Productions. They hoped to make a film of Tryin’ to Sleep in the Bed You Made, based on their 1997 novel, as their first independent feature. They were unhappy with the type of film Hollywood wanted and the film was never made.

In 2009 they spoke at the first annual California Book Club Summit and were part of a panel discussion on the unease of African Americans about the publishing industry.

In 2010 DeBerry co-founded the New Brunswick Jazz Project, a 501(c) (3) nonprofit arts organization dedicated to celebrating the legacy of Jazz, America’s original music and one of its most popular international exports, on a local level. Through presenting regular Jazz performances featuring international, national, regional, local, and student musicians and offering youth educational programs and performances NBJP nurtures and encourages current and future generations of jazz musicians and enthusiasts.

Donna Grant is also a co-founder and former chairman of the board of Footsteps to Follow, Inc. (FTF), a self-funded not-for-profit which brings professionals from an array of disciplines into classrooms, community organizations and churches, in New York City and Nassau County, N.Y.

In 2025, DeBerry and Grant's novels, Tryin’ to Sleep in the Bed You Made, St. Martin’s Press (New York, NY), 1997, Far from the Tree, St. Martin’s Press (New York, NY), 2000 and Better Than I Know Myself, St. Martin’s Press (New York, NY), 2004 were re-released in tradepaper editions by St. Martin’s Press.

== Bibliography ==
- Exposures (as Marie Joyce), Warner Books/Popular Library (New York, NY),1990, BackinPrint (iUniverse) 2005.
- Tryin’ to Sleep in the Bed You Made, St. Martin’s Press (New York, NY), 1997.
- Far from the Tree, St. Martin’s Press (New York, NY), 2000.
- Better Than I Know Myself, St. Martin’s Press (New York, NY), 2004.
- Gotta Keep On Tryin’: A Novel (sequel to Tryin’ to Sleep in the Bed You Made), Simon & Schuster (New York, NY), 2008.
- What Doesn’t Kill You: A Novel, Simon & Schuster (New York, NY), 2009.
- Uptown: A Novel, Simon & Schuster (New York, NY), 2010

== Awards ==
- Black Caucus of the American Library Association 1998 BCALA Honor Award in fiction for Tryin' to sleep in the bed you made
- BlackBoard Bestseller List 1998 Book of the Year Award for Tryin’ to Sleep in the Bed You Made It was he best-selling hardcover book among African-American authors in 1997-’98
- Girl Book Club, 1997 New Author of the Year Award
