= Susan Across the Ocean =

Studio album by the Silos
- Released: 1994
- Recorded: 1993
- Genre: Rock 'n' roll
- Label: Watermelon
- Producer: Walter Salas-Humara, David McNair

The Silos chronology
Diablo (1993)	Susan Across the Ocean (1994)	Ask the Dust: Recordings 1980–1988 (1994)

Susan Across the Ocean is an album by the American band the Silos, released in 1994. They supported it with a North American tour. A version of the album, Diablo, was released in Europe in 1993, minus two tracks. Susan Across the Ocean was nominated for a 1994 National Association of Independent Record Distributors Indie Award in the "alternative rock" category.

== Production ==
The album was produced by frontman Walter Salas-Humara and David McNair. Salas-Humara was backed by Daren Hess on drums, Scott Garber on bass, and Mary Rowell on violin. The band's guitar player, Manuel Verzosa, was killed in a car accident shortly after the recording sessions; the album is dedicated to him. Jon Dee Graham played pedal steel on "All She Wrote". Salas-Humara appreciated this lineup of the band and said that Susan Across the Ocean was the easiest Silos album to record. "I'm Straight" is a cover of the Jonathan Richman song. "Let's Take Some Drugs and Drive Around" was written by Michael Hall. "Change the Locks" is a cover of the Lucinda Williams song; the Silos version inspired Tom Petty to record it. "Wanna Ride" is a cover of a song by Pork, a Texas band. The title track is about an older man wondering if he made a mistake by not marrying a girlfriend from his younger years.

== Critical reception ==
Professional ratings
Review scores
Source	Rating
Calgary Herald	A
Robert Christgau	(1-star Honorable Mention)
Des Moines Register	3.5/5 stars
The Encyclopedia of Popular Music	4/5 stars
The Indianapolis Star	3.5/4 stars
The Great Indie Discography	5/10
MusicHound Rock: The Essential Album Guide	4/5 stars
Orlando Sentinel	4/5 stars
Philadelphia Daily News	3.5/4 stars
Spin Alternative Record Guide	7/10

The Philadelphia Daily News noted that the Silos are "at times reminiscent of the Rolling Stones, Velvet Underground and Little Feat". Newsday said that Salas-Humara writes and sings "an alluring, precise form of heartland guitar pop with an intimate but vague lyrical edge." The Indianapolis Star stated, "The essence of rock 'n' roll can be found in these 12 tracks... The music drives and builds; it's playful and raw." Robert Christgau praised the cover choices.

The Times-Colonist said, "Salas-Humara's drooling, drawling readings inhabit a cast of characters living in the shadows fulltime." The Calgary Herald opined, "Like the Mekons ... the Silos simply strap on their guitars, set up the drums, add a little mood-enhancing viola and then do what is not simple—come up with songs that are humorous, haunting, playful, remorseful, hopeful, that meander moodily, that rock, that echo with the spirit of old-time country". The Courier-Journal said that "Salas-Humara's perfectly ragged voice is complemented by a band that mixes headlong passion with imagination and restraint."

== Track listing ==
No.	Title	Length
1.	"Let's Take Some Drugs and Drive Around"
2.	"Upside Down Instead"
3.	"Shaking All Over the Place"
4.	"All She Wrote"
5.	"Wanna Ride"
6.	"Susan Across the Ocean"
7.	"Change the Locks"
8.	"The Sounds Next Door"
9.	"Start to Burn"
10.	"Nothing's Gonna Last"
11.	"I'm Straight"
12.	"Fallen Angel"
