= Meadow (album) =

Studio album by Richard Buckner
- Released: September 12, 2006
- Studios: Recorded by JD Foster at his place, my place, and another place.
- Length: 33:51
- Label: Merge
- Producer: JD Foster

Richard Buckner chronology
Dents and Shells (2004)	Meadow (2006)	Our Blood (2011)

Meadow is the seventh studio album by Richard Buckner. It was released by Merge Records in 2006.

== Composition and lyrics ==
The album's lead track, "Town", has received particular attention from reviewers. In AllMusic, Thom Jurek wrote, "'Pretty destroyed/comin' through/[seize] your spin/around the room...are you sitting down?' These are some of the lyrics from 'Town,' the opening track on Richard Buckner's Meadow, sung to an urgent progression of distorted electric and acoustic guitars and drums. As unsettling as this is, the song is chock-full of Buckner's inherent melodic sense, and it's easier to bear, somehow, this darkness and melancholy."

In Pitchfork, Brian Howe wrote, "The elliptical on-the-lam song 'Town', where Buckner's voice skids over crashing waves of guitar, is a perfect example of the tense instrumental/vocal interface and compelling inscrutability that mark his modern style. There's an elusive 'it' that scuttles off every time you think you've drawn a bead on it; there's a one-sided dialogue with an unknown interlocutor; there're clusters of self-negating language circling the unspeakable; and most of all, there's a sense of glittering stasis and temporal inflation, as if this one infinitesimal instant has become a recursive loop Buckner's trying to sing his way out of: 'Last night the rain just wouldn't fall,' he sings, pregnant drops trembling in midair."

Andrew Gilstrap of PopMatters wrote, "He's always been fond of finding new ways to say things, and then breaking down that way of saying it to find yet another way to say it. As a result, Buckner's original meaning seems less important, and the listener’s own interpretations seem increasingly valid. Take, for example, the following snippet from album-opener 'Town': 'Pretty destroyed / Coming through / Seizures spin around the room / Eastern time, seasons call / They're not the same when they show at all'. Certainly, that’s chock-full of meaning for Buckner, but that meaning is anyone’s guess at this point...so we have to fill in the blanks. And that’s just fine; music would mean a lot less without listener identification anyway."

== Reception ==
In a 7.5/10 Pitchfork review, Brian Howe wrote, "The raw twang and declarative simplicity of Buckner's debut marked it as a clear emanation of the folk tradition... But Richard Buckner doesn't play folk music anymore. After Bloomed, he set about dismantling the idiom, closing in on something gnomic and self-contained, with no clear connection to any tradition outside of its own.... The lyrics are dense with subjectivity, attaching one hallucinatory image to another by obscure but inflexible dream logic."

In Hybrid Magazine, Embo Blake wrote, "This album contains all the things we've come to expect from Buckner — great dark music and lyrics that have a timeless quality — one that stands them easily next to traditional American folk music in their quality and importance. Hopefully this record will finally be the wake-up call that the world needs to take notice and give props to this amazing writer, placing him on that top shelf next to the greats like [Bob] Dylan, [and Neil] Young."

In AllMusic, Thom Jurek wrote, "Musically, Meadow is perhaps Buckner's least formal album, though Since is a close second. Often what's happened on his albums, such as on Dents and Shells, or even the criminally underrated Devotion + Doubt, is that the darkness is rendered impenetrable by the instrumentation. Not so here. The symbiotic relationship these players have to the material and the singer takes it all further. You want to flinch when hearing these observations of a life broken further by its insistence on not hiding its brokenness and its poverty of ability to cement relationships, though not in spirit or heart which never quite gives up hope even as it surrenders one pairing, one grouping after another. No one writes love songs like these. They're funeral pyres adorned in fragrances, flowers, mementoes and rock & roll.”

In PopMatters, Andrew Gilstrap wrote, "All in all, Meadow sounds like a natural step in the evolution of Buckner's sound. He's still poetic and hard to pin down, but if there's one criticism, it's that his fondness for the midtempo-to-slightly-uptempo range risks making things run together. [But] Meadow's a solid record, one that gives back what the listener puts in."

== Track listing ==
All songs written by Richard Buckner.

1. "Town"
2. "Canyon"
3. "Lucky"
4. "Mile"
5. "Before"
6. "Window"
7. "Kingdom"
8. "Numbered"
9. "Spell"
10. "The Tether and the Tie"

== Personnel ==
- Richard Buckner – vocals, musician
- Doug Gillard – musician
- Kevin March – musician
- Rob Burger – musician
- Stephen Goulding – musician
- JD Foster – musician, producer
- Andy Taub – mixing
