= Adequate Desire =

Studio album by Michael Hall
- Released: 1994
- Studio: Audio Image
- Genre: Rock
- Label: Dejadisc
- Producer: Michael Hall

Michael Hall chronology
Love is Murder (1993)	Adequate Desire (1994)	Frank Slade's 29th Dream EP (1995)

Adequate Desire is an album by the American musician Michael Hall, released in 1994. The album title comes from a line in an Emily Dickinson poem. Hall supported the album with a North American tour.

== Production ==
Mary Rowell and Walter Salas-Humara, of the Silos, contributed to the album. The album was recorded in Austin, Texas; its release was delayed due to record label issues. "Hello, Mr. Death" is a tribute to the late musician Manny Verzosa. "Every Little Thing", cowritten by Bill Lloyd, is about a friend's new baby.

== Critical reception ==
Professional ratings
Review scores
Source	Rating
AllMusic	2.5/5 stars
Chicago Sun-Times	3.5/4 stars
Christgau's Consumer Guide	A−
Lincoln Journal Star	4/5 stars

Trouser Press thought that "the alternately stirring and somber Adequate Desire confronts birth, life, love and death in handsomely rounded songs that don’t pretend to possess answers to anything." Robert Christgau wrote that Hall's "not just trying to pin the moment when love reveals its mystery—he's trying to make it last as he looks death in the eye." Texas Monthly determined that the album "suggests a street-weary Lou Reed hanging out in the alleys of Austin with the grunge generation while secretly wishing he was hanging out with James Joyce in exile." The Chicago Sun-Times noted that "there is enough searing guitar (by Hall and others) to satisfy hard-rock fans, while his organ lends a churchy feel and the door also is opened to country."

The Washington Post concluded that as, "a former rock critic, Hall tends toward the simple and the wry; rather than rhapsodize about romance, he shrugs ... or admits bewilderment." Newsday opined: "Singing in a plain, neighborly tenor, Hall's mild guitar-rock songs on Adequate Desire shimmer with taste, intelligence and catchy melodies." The Dallas Morning News stated: "Smart without belaboring the point, Mr. Hall has produced some real gems, from the Zen inclusiveness of the rocking 'Every Little Thing' to the regretful but determined distance that drives 'My Last Letter Home'."

AllMusic wrote that "the standout is 'Hello Mr. Death', which is one side of a conversation with the Grim Reaper... Hall's wry, offhand reflections on love and mortality in this piece rank with his best work."

== Track listing ==
No.	Title	Length
1.	"Every Little Thing"
2.	"I Just Do"
3.	"Out of This World"
4.	"Tremblin'"
5.	"My Last Letter Home"
6.	"Under the Rainbow with You"
7.	"Where Is My Girl?"
8.	"A New Favorite Place"
9.	"It's Hard to Wake Up in the Morning"
10.	"I Can't Stand It"
11.	"Merry Christmas from Mars"
12.	"Hello, Mr. Death"
