= The Setters =

Collaborative rock music project

The Setters was a collaborative musical project between rock-n-roll songwriters Walter Salas-Humara of the Silos, Alejandro Escovedo of True Believers, and Michael Hall of the Wild Seeds. The band originated when Hall told a music festival he wanted to play at that he was in a band with Salas-Humara and Escovedo. Hall came up with the band name "The Setters" off the top of his head when the festival organizers asked him what the band's name was. Hall then called up Salas-Humara to ask him to perform with him at the festival, and Salas-Humara agreed. They released a single, self-titled album in 1993 on the German Blue Million Miles record label, and which was released the following year in the United States on Watermelon Records. The album was produced by Gurf Morlix, and featured performances by accordionist Lisa Mednick and bassist Scott Garber (Giant Sand). The tracks on the album are all new recordings of songs originally written by Salas-Humara, Escovedo, or Hall. Brian Beatty gave the album 3 stars out of 5, writing, "Though there's no arguing with the quality of the songs here, most of them have appeared on albums much better than this one. Purchase those albums first."
