= Bradley Skaught =

American singer-songwriter

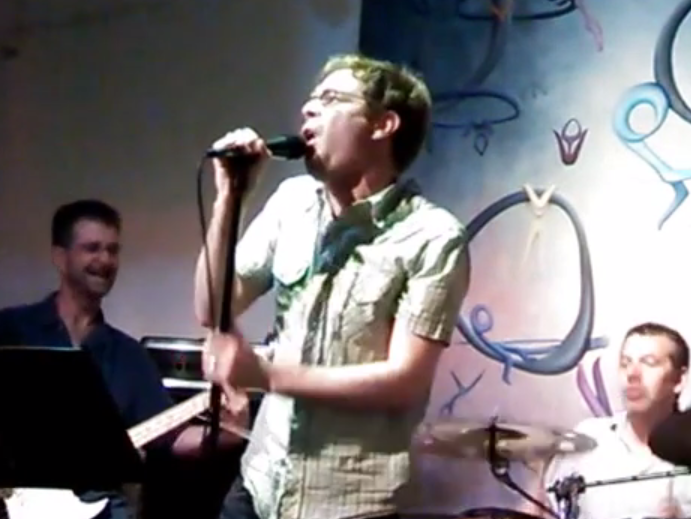
- Bradley Skaught in July 2013, performing with Game Theory at memorial for Scott Miller

Background information
- Born: June 2, 1976 (age 50); Tacoma, Washington, U.S.
- Genres: Indie rock, power pop
- Occupations: Pop musician, songwriter
- Instruments: Guitar, vocals
- Website: www.byebyeblackbirds.com

Bradley Joel Skaught is the principal songwriter, guitarist, and lead vocalist for The Bye Bye Blackbirds, an Oakland, California-based indie rock and power pop band. Skaught's vocals have been called "distinctive and lovely", "a unique drawl reminiscent of Tom Petty", and likened to John Lennon. The San Francisco Chronicle described his band's work as "British Invasion guitar-pop with a twinge of country and roots," in which "disparate rock influences – '60s rock, '70s power pop, '80s college radio and indie rock – come together for catchy, harmony-laden songs."

== Musical career ==
=== Early years ===
Skaught is originally from Tacoma, Washington. He began taking drum lessons while in second grade and learned to play guitar in sixth grade. He Later moved to Oakland, California, where his musical career included a stint as drummer for Yuji Oniki.

=== Belle Da Gama ===
Skaught became better known as a guitarist and vocalist when he founded the Oakland-based band Belle Da Gama, which included Ian Robertson. The name Belle Da Gama was taken from the Salman Rushdie novel The Moor's Last Sigh. Belle Da Gama recorded one album, Garden Abstract, released in 2001 on 125 Records.

In 2005, Skaught and Robertson disbanded Belle Da Gama and formed The Bye Bye Blackbirds.

=== The Bye Bye Blackbirds ===
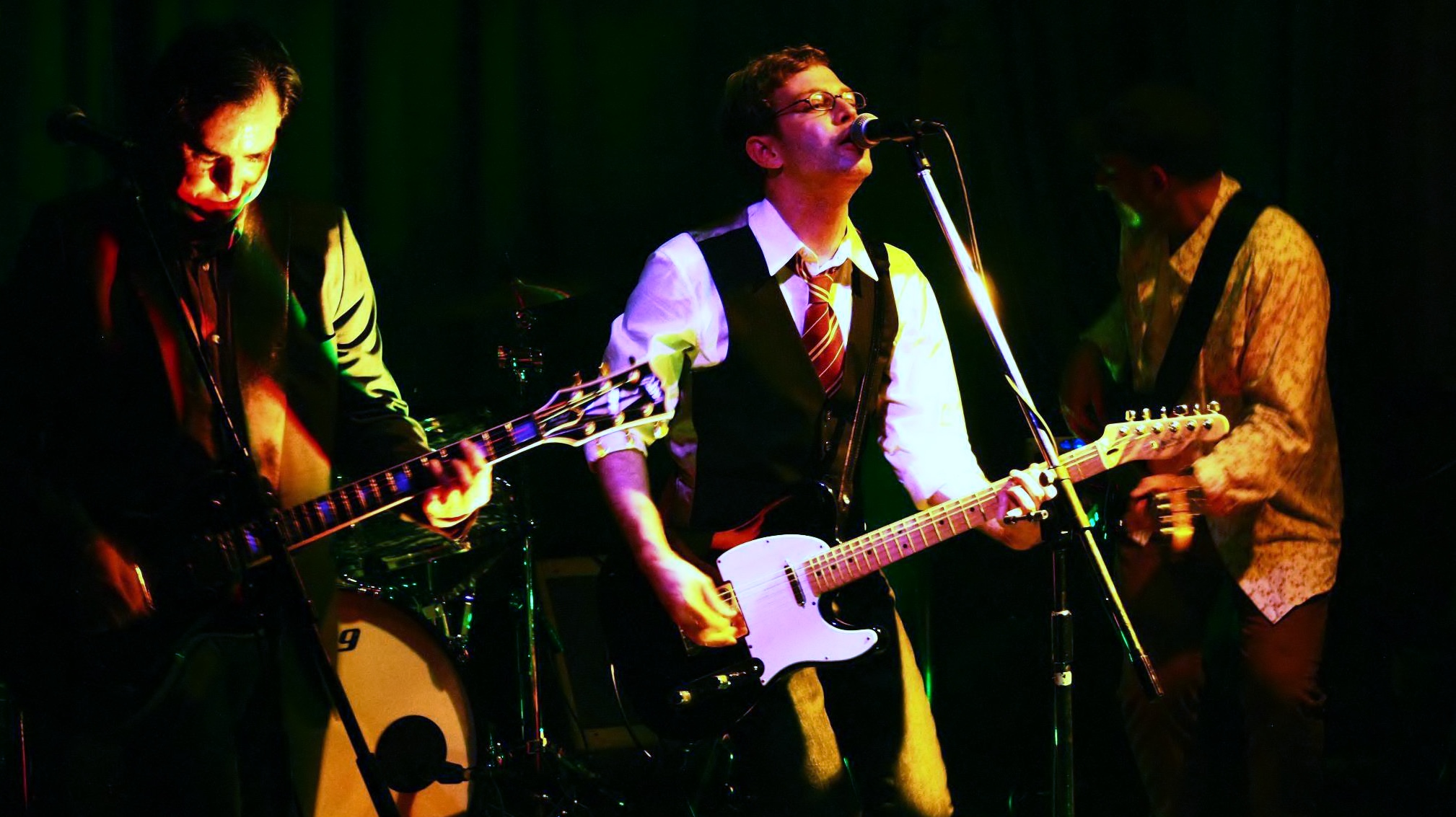
Bradley Skaught (center) performing with The Bye Bye Blackbirds in Berkeley, in September 2013

Skaught and Robertson, both guitarists, named the new group after the 1926 jazz standard Bye Bye Blackbird. They recruited drummer Lenny Gill and bass player William Duke online. In forming the new band, Skaught and Robertson decided on a "back-to-basics approach" based on "fundamental things we loved as listeners – songwriting, harmony, cool guitar parts and sounds."

The group's debut recording, an EP called Honeymoon, was released in 2006. Skaught later referred to Honeymoon as "a bit embarrassing to me, although I like a couple songs and I love the sound... It works to me as a kind of statement of intent, but it makes me squirm to hear it."

In 2008, the group released their first full-length album, Houses and Homes, on the American Dust label in 2008. Rock critic Richie Unterberger likened Houses and Homes to British Invasion bands, with "tunes and [Skaught's] upper-register vocals [that] often echo some of the poppier Beatlesque groups of yore," praising the album's sensitive lyrics and "upbeat guitar-oriented pop/rock with a tinge of the bittersweet." Skaught called Houses and Homes "satisfyingly better than Honeymoon to me.... We experimented a lot – goofy stuff with tape echoes and lots of layers." The bluegrass-tinged song "The Ghosts Are All Right" was featured in the book Music: What Happened?, which named it as a favorite for that year, describing the song as "a Byrds-worthy meditation on history and responsibility in a local community."

Apology Accepted, a download-only EP released in 2008, included "Monster Eyes", a song that was co-written by Skaught with novelist Jonathan Lethem. Based upon "lyrical fragments" of Lethem's novel You Don't Love Me Yet, the song was performed by the band, with Lethem, at a reading from the book. The title track of Apology Accepted was a cover of a song by The Go-Betweens.

Before recording 2011's Fixed Hearts, bass player William Duke, who had previously shared songwriting responsibilities with Skaught, left the band. Skaught stated that writing all of the songs on Fixed Hearts was "liberating" and that the album benefited from his resulting confidence, and from the contributions of new bass player Aaron Rubin and producer Paul Tyler. The title was a reference to drummer Lenny Gill's then-recent heart surgery, as well as to the protagonists of the songs, who emerge from heartbreak with their own hearts repaired.

Reviewing Fixed Hearts, AllMusic's Jack Rabid wrote that the album had the "brightly ringing, polished/unthreatening, anodyne" 1960s pop vibe of a "groovy guitar pop party" where "nice guys finish first and get the girl in the finale." The review cited Skaught's "easy sincerity and the group's harmonic gifts," embracing a "Panglossian panoply of this period from when they were pups, cutting in country-pop, folk, and—heck yeah—a horns-laden opener with bits of Memphis soul." A review in The Aquarian Weekly cited the "general giddiness of the album", moving from a "nostalgic and swinging vibe" through songs with a "country-pop sound" and "pulsing drums", to the "peaceful" final tracks.

In 2013, the group released We Need the Rain, which was named one of the "Top 20 Releases of 2013" by Goldmine. Critic John M. Borack cited Skaught's contributions on guitar that "jangle, strum and get muscular when they need to."

Skaught dedicated We Need the Rain to Scott Miller, his "musical mentor". Miller was not involved with the album, but Skaught told the San Francisco Chronicle that Miller's death in April 2013 was "the most painful and devastating blow", leading Skaught to consider the album "a kind of anchor, something to channel all that chaos through ... It's the first record we've made that we couldn't take to him and get that final vote of confidence on."

The San Francisco Chronicle described the album as having "sweetly melancholy jingle-jangle and satisfyingly gutsy guitar and bass parts" with "soulful crunch". Reviewer Bill Kopp wrote in Musoscribe that "chiming guitars, ear candy hooks, punchy guitar riffage, tight vocal harmonies" provide the emotional and "visceral punch" of power pop. In Dirty Impound, Dennis Cook wrote, "Every tune practically shimmies out of the speakers, cool small details etched into ceaselessly ear-snagging melodies as sweet, gently yearning voices sing about love and the weather in ways that make both seem brand new."

According to Tris McCall of the Newark Star-Ledger, the album took a new and "more aggressive approach" in which "guitars still twinkle and shimmer, on occasion, but this time around, they growl, twist, stutter and snap, too." McCall wrote, "Although Skaught's essential optimism is always visible," this "isn't always a happy album", with songs "both more direct and more discontented" than Skaught's prior work. "Yet it is the deepest, gutsiest and most rewarding set in the band's discography, and it points the way forward for a project that once felt like a formal exercise in songcraft."

=== Other projects ===
Skaught received a production credit for his assistance on the Omnivore Recordings 2014 reissue of Game Theory's 1984 album Dead Center. He appeared as a featured artist on Big Cinnamon (2013) by the Agony Aunts, and played acoustic guitar on Alison Faith Levy's solo CD World of Wonder (2012).

== Discography ==
=== With Belle Da Gama ===
- Garden Abstract (2001)

=== With The Bye Bye Blackbirds ===
Albums & EPs:

- Honeymoon (2006)
- Apology Accepted (EP, 2008)
- Houses and Homes (2008)
- Fixed Hearts (2011)
- We Need The Rain (2013)
- Take Out the Poison (2017)

Singles:

- "Let Your Hair Fall Down" b/w "These Blues" (2015)
- "Even Hitler Had A Girlfriend" b/w "Population: Us" (7" single, 2014) (as Dr. Frank & The Bye Bye Blackbirds)

Various artist compilations:

- Crayon Angel: A Tribute to the Music of Judee Sill (2009)
