= Cuba (album) =

Studio album by the Silos
- Released: 1987
- Genre: Rock, alternative country
- Label: Record Collect

The Silos chronology
About Her Steps (1985)	Cuba (1987)	Tennessee Fire (1987)

Cuba is the second album by the American band the Silos, released in 1987. The band supported the album with a North American tour.

== Production ==
Parts of Cuba were recorded in Deerfield Beach, Florida. Although incorrectly credited on some pressings of the album, lead guitarist Bob Rupe re-recorded all of Rick Wagner's bass parts after Wagner left the band. A video was made for "Tennessee Fire", which became a hit on MTV. "For Always" is about marital bliss.

== Critical reception ==
Professional ratings
Review scores
Source	Rating
AllMusic	4.5/5 stars
Chicago Sun-Times	3.5/4 stars
Robert Christgau	B+
The Encyclopedia of Popular Music	4/5 stars
MusicHound Rock: The Essential Album Guide	3.5/5 stars
The Rolling Stone Album Guide	3/5 stars
Spin Alternative Record Guide	7/10

Trouser Press wrote that the album "finds Mary Rowell’s violin emerging as an integral element in the Silos’ sound." The Chicago Reader thought that "there's a sober, even slightly ominous undercurrent to these matter-of-factly domestic songs." The New York Times opined that "[Walter] Salas-Humara takes a longer view of relationships than most pop songwriters ... from low-key stories, the Silos draw rock epiphanies." The Chicago Sun-Times declared the album to be "the finest independently released rock album in '87."

AllMusic called the album "something of a low-flying classic," writing that "lyrics like 'Margaret goes to bed around eight/I go to bed around one' capture something elusive with small, everyday details." The Pitch deemed it a "masterwork," writing that it "is thought by some to be the holy grail of the alt-country movement."

== Track listing ==
No.	Title	Length
1.	"Tennessee Fire"	5:37
2.	"She Lives Up the Street"	3:12
3.	"For Always"	4:13
4.	"Margaret"	3:08
5.	"Mary's Getting Married"	3:49
6.	"Memories"	3:02
7.	"Just This Morning"	3:44
8.	"Going Round"	4:10
9.	"It's Alright"	2:31
10.	"All Falls Away"	4:38

== Personnel ==
- John Galway – drums
- Mary Rowell – violin
- Bob Rupe – guitar, bass
- Walter Salas-Humara – guitar, vocals
