= Opposite Sex (album) =

Studio album by the Vulgar Boatmen
- Released: 1995
- Genre: Rock, folk-pop
- Label: Blanco Y Negro
- Producer: Robert Ray

The Vulgar Boatmen chronology
Please Panic (1992)	Opposite Sex (1995)	Opposite Sex EP (1996)

Opposite Sex is an album by the American band the Vulgar Boatmen, released in 1995. They promoted the album with appearances on Later... with Jools Holland and at the Glastonbury Festival. The U.S. release was initially delayed for almost two years, with the band eventually acknowledging that a domestic release would not happen.

== Production ==
The songs were written between 1991 and 1994. The band recorded 14 and decided on the final 12 after an advance tape had circulated. "Heartbeat" is a version of the Gizmos song. "Genie Says" uses a Walter Salas-Humara vocal from one of the band's first tapes. Carey Crane, who had not appeared on the band's Please Panic, sings on the title track. As with the Vulgar Boatmen's other albums, many of the songs are about wandering and using travels for renewed creativity.

== Critical reception ==
Professional ratings
Review scores
Source	Rating
AllMusic	4.5/5 stars
The Encyclopedia of Popular Music	4/5 stars
The Great Alternative & Indie Discography	7/10
The Guardian	4/5 stars
Poole and Dorset Advertiser	0/5 stars
The Yorkshire Evening Press	4/5 stars

The Indianapolis Star said that "the songs fall into two basic categories: insistent rock with ticking guitar and drums or languid, countrified folk-pop." The Guardian called the album "a minor classic", and stated that "some of the tracks might seem to be just too simple, but the sparse treatment has an eerie charm and every single note is made to matter, especially when predictably sparse keyboard and viola are added in." The Poole and Dorset Advertiser panned Opposite Sex, noting that "the same pace runs through this—slow or very slow."

The Independent described the songs as "the mysteries of courtship, veiled and set to inhibited guitars." The paper's Andy Gill later wrote, "As with the Feelies and the Silos, the Boatmen's songs are fragile models of pop forms, with just a few light instrumental hints and shades—notably organ and violin—carefully applied so as not to overpower [Robert] Ray and [Dale] Lawrence's vulnerable voices, which owe much to Ricky Nelson and the Everly Brothers." The Washington Post listed Opposite Sex among the best albums of 1996, and noted that the band "have proved restraint can be an essential quality of rock."

== Track listing ==
No.	Title	Length
1.	"When We Walk"
2.	"Wide Awake"
3.	"Call Back Instead"
4.	"In a Station"
5.	"Traveling"
6.	"Shake"
7.	"Heartbeat"
8.	"In a Minute"
9.	"Opposite Sex"
10.	"We Can Walk"
11.	"Genie Says"
12.	"Susan, Goodnight"
