= Impasse (disambiguation) =

An impasse is a breakdown in negotiations. In Real Property Tax Law, an "impasse" is considered to be six (6) months after a Request for Judicial Intervention ("RJI") has been filed, and the parties have not reached a settlement.

Impasse may also refer to:

== Film ==
- Impasse (film), a 1969 American film starring Burt Reynolds
- Cliff Walkers, a 2021 Chinese historical spy thriller previously titled Impasse in English

== Music ==
- Impasse (album), a 2002 album by Richard Buckner
- "Impasse" (Marília Mendonça song), a 2015 Brazilian single
- "Impasse" (Angel Olsen song), from the 2019 album All Mirrors
- "The Impasse" (Hookworms song), from their 2014 album The Hum

== See also ==
- Impasse des Deux Anges, a 1948 French comedy crime film directed by Maurice Tourneur
- Impasse de la vignette, a 1990 French-Belgian-Canadian comedy-drama film
