= Mud, Lies & Shame =

Studio album by Wild Seeds
- Released: 1988
- Genre: Rock, pop
- Label: Passport
- Producer: Howard Benson

Wild Seeds chronology
Brave, Clean + Reverent (1986)	Mud, Lies & Shame (1988)	I'm Sorry, I Can't Rock You All Night Long: 1984–1989 (2001)

Mud, Lies & Shame is the second album by the American band Wild Seeds, released in 1988. The first single was "I'm Sorry, I Can't Rock You All Night Long". The band supported the album with a North American tour.

== Production ==
The album was produced by Howard Benson, who helped Wild Seeds capture a radio-friendly sound. The band added singer Kris McKay prior to the recording sessions; she took the lead vocal on "All This Time". Most of the songs were written by Michael Hall, who considered the album to be pop music; former guitarist Bo Solomon wrote "Virginia". "Debi Came Back" is about a man who fantasizes about the return of a high school flame. "I'm Sorry, I Can't Rock You All Night Long" notes that romantic and sexual relationships often don't compare to descriptions in rock lyrics. "I Have Died a Thousand Times for True Love" employs a Bo Diddley beat. "You Will Be Married to a Jealous Man" is a duet between Hall and McKay.

== Critical reception ==
Professional ratings
Review scores
Source	Rating
AllMusic	3/5 stars
Robert Christgau	B
Omaha World-Herald	4.5/5 stars
Rolling Stone	3.5/5 stars

The St. Petersburg Times called the album "a second helping of witty, winning guitar anthems" and praised Hall's "clever wordplay and strong affection for rock 'n' roll's past and present". The Washington Post said that Wild Seeds "rock pretty conventionally, but Hall's twists provide enough traction to keep its second album ... from getting stuck." The Philadelphia Inquirer labeled Wild Seeds "a solid rock band from Austin whose songs linger one or two steps from the blues and country."

The Toronto Star stated that Mud, Lies & Shame "mixes Texas border music with a rollicking bayou-meets-the-Bowery beat, sweetened by Hall's fanciful lyric sense." The Vancouver Sun likened Hall's songs to "the best of Green on Red, Guadalcanal Diary, the Long Ryders, the Beat Farmers and the Modernettes." Rolling Stone liked that McKay "has most of the irrepressible instincts of ... Maria McKee, but none of her infuriating pretensions."

Trouser Press said that the album "applies slightly slicker roadhouse production to another smart and elegant collection of songs." AllMusic deemed it "more than just your run-of-the-mill college pop stop".

== Track listing ==
No.	Title	Length
1.	"Debi Came Back"
2.	"I'm Sorry, I Can't Rock You All Night Long"
3.	"You Will Be Married to a Jealous Man"
4.	"I Have Died a Thousand Times for True Love"
5.	"Long Train Gone"
6.	"Like a Fall"
7.	"Jack's Walking with the King"
8.	"Ramblin'"
9.	"If I Were a Storm"
10.	"Virginia"
11.	"All This Time"
