= The Silos (album) =

Studio album by the Silos
- Released: 1990
- Recorded: 1989
- Label: RCA
- Producer: Peter Moore, Bob Rupe, Walter Salas-Humara

The Silos chronology
Tennessee Fire (1987)	The Silos (1990)	Hasta la Victoria! (1992)

The Silos is an album by the American band the Silos, released in 1990. A commercial disappointment, it was the band's only album for RCA Records. The Silos peaked at No. 141 on the Billboard 200. The band supported the album with a North American tour that included shows with the Jayhawks.

== Production ==
Produced by Peter Moore, Bob Rupe, and Walter Salas-Humara, the album was recorded in the fall of 1989 at Gainesville's Great Southern Music Hall, an old theater. The band used a single microphone for most of the recording sessions. Rupe played most of the lead guitar parts and Salas-Humara wrote or cowrote most of the songs; they considered each song a discrete thing, rather than worrying about a uniform style. Kenny Margolis played keyboards on the album. Amy Allison provided backing vocals on "The Only Story I Tell". "Maybe Everything" employs a horn section. "I'm Over You" is about ending a relationship by leaving town on a road trip.

== Critical reception ==
Professional ratings
Review scores
Source	Rating
AllMusic	4.5/5 stars
Entertainment Weekly	B+
MusicHound Rock: The Essential Album Guide	3.5/5 stars
Orlando Sentinel	5/5 stars
The Rolling Stone Album Guide	3.5/5 stars
Spin Alternative Record Guide	5/10

The New York Times wrote that "the band's austere style inflects the astringent twang of the Velvet Underground with the drone of R.E.M. and adds countryish echoes that recall Gram Parsons ... [the] enigmatic lyrics are so plainspoken that they have oracular overtones." Entertainment Weekly compared the music to "something like classic rock & roll seen in a dusty rear-view mirror." The Sun Sentinel called the album "a crisp slice of no-frills rock 'n' roll, seasoned with sincerity and soul."

Trouser Press noted that "Rupe and Salas-Humara seem to be taking pains to maintain the songs' scaled-down ramshackle charm, avoiding obvious hooks or gimmicks." The Orlando Sentinel determined that "the contrast between the stronger, rougher low voice of Salas-Humara and Rupe's slightly more supple mid- range voice above it is wonderful." The Globe and Mail considered the music "a raw, sparse sound ... very much of the rock side of country-rock."

AllMusic wrote that "horns, strings, and accordion color the songs without drawing too much attention to themselves so that all the focus remains on Salas-Humara and Rupe's typically solid tunes."

== Track listing ==
No.	Title	Length
1.	"Caroline"
2.	"Picture of Helen"
3.	"Commodore Peter"
4.	"Anyway You Choose Me"
5.	"Maybe Everything"
6.	"I'm Over You"
7.	"Take My Country Back"
8.	"(We'll Go) Out of Town"
9.	"Don't Talk That Way"
10.	"The Only Story I Tell"
11.	"Porque No"
12.	"Here's to You"
