= Bloomed =

Studio album by Richard Buckner
- Released: 1994
- Genre: Folk, country
- Label: Dejadisc
- Producer: Lloyd Maines

Richard Buckner chronology
Bloomed (1994)	Devotion + Doubt (1997)

Bloomed is the debut album by the American musician Richard Buckner. It was released in 1994 via the German label Glitterhouse, and the following year in the United States via Dejadisc. A 1999 reissue appended five bonus tracks.

== Production ==
Produced by Lloyd Maines, the album was recorded in Lubbock, Texas, with additional studio work taking place in Austin. Butch Hancock played harmonica on the album; Ponty Bone played accordion. Buckner decided to make the album without using a rhythm section.

Buckner has originally intended for Bloomed to be a concept album about his lineage and family.

== Critical reception ==
Professional ratings
Review scores
Source	Rating
AllMusic	4/5 stars
The Encyclopedia of Popular Music	3/5 stars
MusicHound Rock: The Essential Album Guide	4/5 stars
Orlando Sentinel	4/5 stars
Pitchfork	8.1/10

The Washington Post wrote that "Buckner's compelling, dust-streaked voice and his knack for visual detail and unexpected metaphor make him a natural disciple of the Lubbock church, but he's still a novice when it comes to the rites of irreverent humor." The Nashville Scene thought that "Buckner’s ghostly, sensual voice is the perfect vehicle for his bittersweet songs of parting and regret—he often sounds like Dwight Yoakam, only less self-conscious and more literate." The Orlando Sentinel praised Buckner's "genuinely lovely, earthy baritone."

The Chicago Tribune determined that Bloomed "starts off strong with several melodically driving tunes and cutting lyrical introspection, but after that engaging intro the proceedings start to drag." The Austin American-Statesman considered it "a sorrowful, almost frighteningly emotional album loaded with regrets." Spin listed it as the 19th best album of 1995.

AllMusic thought that "Maines and his small crew of musicians ... give Buckner's songs all the care they deserve, adding to the nuances of the melodies and moods with a master's touch, and Maines' own steel guitar work is especially striking." In a 1997 concert review, The New York Times noted the "dark, poetic lining to his sparse songs, an edge that made his album Bloomed one of 1995's most compelling debuts." Reviewing a 1999 reissue, Pitchfork wrote that "when Buckner veers closer to traditional folk, he invests his songs with an almost apocalyptic urgency."

== Track listing ==
No.	Title	Length
1.	"Blue and Wonder"
2.	"Rainsquall"
3.	"22"
4.	"Mud"
5.	"Six Years"
6.	"This Is Where"
7.	"Gauzy Dress in the Sun"
8.	"Daisychain"
9.	"Desire"
10.	"Up North"
11.	"Surprise, AZ"
12.	"Cradle to the Angel"
