= Dejadisc =

Dejadisc was a roots music-oriented record label based in Austin, Texas which was active from 1992 to 1997. It was known for the numerous, eclectic singer-songwriters who were signed to it.

== History ==
Dejadisc was founded by Steve Wilkison in 1992. In 1995, the label released Richard Buckner's debut album, Bloomed. Buckner subsequently left the label to release his next album, Devotion + Doubt, on MCA Records. In 1997, he claimed that he hadn't made any money from Bloomed, and that Wilkison would not return the master tapes from the album to him. Wilkison replied that he has paid Buckner in the past, and has never tried to hide the amount of money he owes him. In 1996, Wilkison announced that he was relocating the label's offices to Nashville, Tennessee. In February 1997, Wilkison told Billboard that he was putting the label on hiatus. The label went out of business later that year.

== Artists ==
Artists who released one or more albums on DejaDisc included:

- Richard Buckner
- Michael Hall
- Rainravens
- Ray Wylie Hubbard
- Michael Fracasso
- Elliott Murphy
- Jo Carol Pierce
- Wayne Hancock
- Shoulders
- David Lewis

== Later developments ==
Despite Wilkison's February 1997 statement to Billboard that the label was going on hiatus, the magazine No Depression reported in a later issue that Wilkison, from his new base in Nashville, maintained that "Dejadisc has not closed its doors."

== Discography ==
In addition to its artist roster, Dejadisc released compilation samplers, including All in Good Time: The Second DejaDisc Sampler, reviewed by AllMusic critic Steven McDonald, who described the label as known for its "eclectic roster" of singer-songwriters working in roots music.
