= Bye Bye Blackbird (disambiguation) =

"Bye Bye Blackbird" is a song published in 1926 by the American composer Ray Henderson and lyricist Mort Dixon.

Bye Bye Blackbird may also refer to:

- Bye Bye Blackbird (John Coltrane album), 1962
- Bye Bye Blackbird (Keith Jarrett album), 1993
- Bye Bye Blackbird (film), a 2005 drama film directed by Robinson Savary
- The Bye Bye Blackbirds, an indie pop band founded in 2006 in Oakland, California
- "Bye Bye Blackbird", a song from the 2010 Quasi album American Gong
