= Small Minds =

Studio album by Austin Lounge Lizards
- Released: 1995
- Genre: Bluegrass, Newgrass, satire
- Length: 40:27
- Label: Watermelon
- Producer: Conrad Deisler

Austin Lounge Lizards chronology
Paint Me on Velvet (1993)	Small Minds (1995)	Employee of the Month (1998)

Professional ratings
Review scores
Source	Rating
AllMusic	3/5 stars
The Austin Chronicle	3.5/4 stars
The Encyclopedia of Popular Music	2/5 stars

Small Minds is a studio album by Austin-based bluegrass band Austin Lounge Lizards. It continues the Lizards' tradition of social and political satire.

== Critical reception ==
The Austin Chronicle called the opening track a "drunk, horn-seasoned version of Emily Kaitz's Kerrville fave 'Shallow End of the Gene Pool.'"

AllMusic called Small Minds "a finely played and sung album that's a pleasure to listen to and gets a definite recommendation." "Gingrich the Newt" postulates politician Newt Gingrich has given "the humble newt species a bad name) to the intelligentsia of the art world." The song begins: "We'd like to set the record straight by singing of the newt." It then implies Gingrich has none of these values. Instead, "Gingrich the Newt is puffed up like a toad / So full of himself that he's bound to explode."

== Track listing ==
No.	Title	Writer(s)	Lead Vocal	Length
1.	"Shallow End of the Gene Pool"	Emily Kaitz	Kirk Williams	4:43
2.	"Half a Man"	Hank Card, Conrad Deisler	Hank Card	3:03
3.	"Old Blevins"	Conrad Deisler, Hank Card	Conrad Deisler	4:47
4.	"Big Tex's Girl"	Hank Card, Kristen Nelson	Hank Card	5:33
5.	"Do Not Go to Tennessee"	Hank Card	Hank Card	2:46
6.	"Truckload of Art"	Terry Allen	Richard Bowden	3:55
7.	"Gingrich the Newt"	Hank Card	Hank Card	1:56
8.	"Irving"	Hank Card	Hank Card	3:56
9.	"Life Is Hard, But Life Is Hardest When You're Dumb"	Hank Card	Tom Pittman	3:01
10.	"Bonfire of the Inanities"	Hank Card	Hank Card	3:17
11.	"Mourning Edition" (excerpts the Morning Edition Theme by B. J. Leiderman)	Hank Card	Hank Card	3:30
Total length:				40:27

== Personnel ==
- Richard Bowden: fiddle, trumpet, Perot, livestock, violin vocals
- Hank Card: rhythm guitar, vocals
- Conrad Deisler: acoustic and electric guitars, mandolin, Blevins, livestock, vocals
- Tom Pittman: steel guitar, banjo, vocals
- Kirk Williams: bass, livestock, vocals

=== Additional Personnel ===
- Ray Benson: vocals, lead Blevins (on 3)
- John Mills: tenor and baritone saxophone
- Paul Pearcy: drums, percussion, marching snare, bongos
- Boo Resnick: vocals, Blevins (on 3)
