= Michael Hall (Texas musician) =

American singer-songwriter and journalist

- Born: North Carolina
- Origin: Austin, Texas
- Genres: Singer-songwriter
- Instrument: Guitar
- Years active: 1985–present
- Labels: Dejadisc, Blue Rose, Record Collect, Safe House

Michael Hall is an American singer-songwriter and journalist from Austin, Texas. Musically, he is known for his work as the frontman of the Wild Seeds and for his subsequent solo career. He has written articles for multiple publications, including Trouser Press, the Austin American-Statesman, and the Austin Chronicle. Since 1997, he has written for Texas Monthly.

== Biography ==
A native of North Carolina, Hall received a degree in government from the University of Texas at Austin in 1979. He subsequently worked at the University of Texas's journalism school and the Austin Chronicle before starting his musical career.

=== Musical career ===
Hall founded the Wild Seeds in 1984. After they broke up in 1989, he embarked on a solo career, starting with his 1990 solo debut, Quarter to Three. The album included performances from Walter Salas-Humara and J. D. Foster (both of the Silos), as well as Rich Brotherton and Rosie Flores. As of 2006, he had released eight total solo albums. In the 1990s, he joined with Salas-Humara and Alejandro Escovedo to form the Setters, which released one album in 1993. In 2000, he formed Michael Hall and the Woodpeckers, a group consisting of him and multiple other well-known Austin musicians.

== Discography ==
=== Solo ===
- Quarter to Three (Record Collect, 1990)
- Love Is Murder (Safe House, 1993)
- Adequate Desire (Dejadisc, 1994)
- Frank Slade's 29th Dream (Dejadisc EP, 1995)
- Day (Dejadisc, 1996)
- The Song He Was Listening to When He Died (Freedom, 2006)

=== With the Woodpeckers ===
- Dead by Dinner (Blue Rose, 2000)
- Lucky Too (Blue Rose, 2001)

=== With Wild Seeds ===
- Life Is Grand (Life in Soul City) (Aznut EP, 1984)
- Brave, Clean + Reverent (Jungle, 1986)
- Mud, Lies & Shame (Passport, 1988)
- I'm Sorry, I Can't Rock You All Night Long: 1984–1989 (Aznut compilation, 2001)

=== With the Setters ===
- The Setters (Watermelon, 1994)
