= Please Panic =

Studio album by the Vulgar Boatmen
- Released: 1992
- Label: Safe House
- Producer: Jonathan Isley, Robert Ray

The Vulgar Boatmen chronology
You and Your Sister (1989)	Please Panic (1992)	Opposite Sex (1995)

Please Panic is an album by the American band the Vulgar Boatmen, released in 1992. The band supported the album with North American and European tours. "You Don't Love Me Yet" inspired the title of Jonathan Lethem's 2007 novel. In 2018, the album was reissued by the Berlin-based label play loud! productions, with liner notes by Charles Taylor.

== Production ==
The album was produced by Jonathan Isley and Robert Ray. The songs were written by Ray and Dale Lawrence. Please Panic was recorded mostly in Florida, with two sessions taking place in Indiana. The band recorded many songs in Ray's house, using an 8-track. Between the Indiana and Florida contingents of the band, plus guest musicians, 19 people played on the album. "There's a Family" is about a Ray family Christmas trip to Memphis, his hometown.

== Critical reception ==
Professional ratings
Review scores
Source	Rating
AllMusic	3/5 stars
Robert Christgau	(2-star Honorable Mention)
The Encyclopedia of Popular Music	4/5 stars
The Rolling Stone Album Guide	3.5/5 stars
Spin Alternative Record Guide	7/10

The Chicago Tribune noted that "the band's minimalist pop calls to mind Buddy Holly and Workingman's-era Grateful Dead, while the offhanded, diffident attitude expressed in such songs as 'Don't Mention It' or 'I'm Not Stuck on You' recall the less-is-more emotional stance of Southeastern alternative pop bands of the early '80s." Trouser Press determined that "the tonal equality of the singers' voices, the claustrophobic narrowness of the stylistic approach and the writers' consistent lyrical tenor all dispel any fear of organizational confusion." Rolling Stone wrote: "More precise and polished than the Boatmen's highly praised debut ... Please Panic is a translucent collection of eloquent beauty and delicate vigor... Spartan arrangements give it a subtle allure."

The Virginian-Pilot praised the "insightful writing, taut instrumentation and roomy, economic arrangements that shun convention." The Chicago Reader concluded that Please Panic lacks "the dramatic atmospherics of the first album, but it's still an extremely impressive cycle of heartfelt songs and unadorned, respectful instrumentation." Phoenix New Times opined that "the Boatmen display a rare (in rock, anyway) understanding of how gray even good lives get, but ... they neglect to mention how many shades of gray there are." Greil Marcus, in Artforum, deemed the album a "light, irreducible set of songs about falling into ordinary love affairs and getting into your car and driving away."

== Track listing ==
No.	Title	Length
1.	"Don't Mention It"
2.	"Calling Upstairs"
3.	"We Can Figure This Out"
4.	"Fool Me"
5.	"You Don't Love Me Yet"
6.	"There's a Family"
7.	"You're the One"
8.	"Goodnight, Jean-Marie"
9.	"I'm Not Stuck on You"
10.	"Allison Says"
11.	"Stop Alternating"
12.	"The 23rd of September"
