= The Bye Bye Blackbirds =

American indie rock band

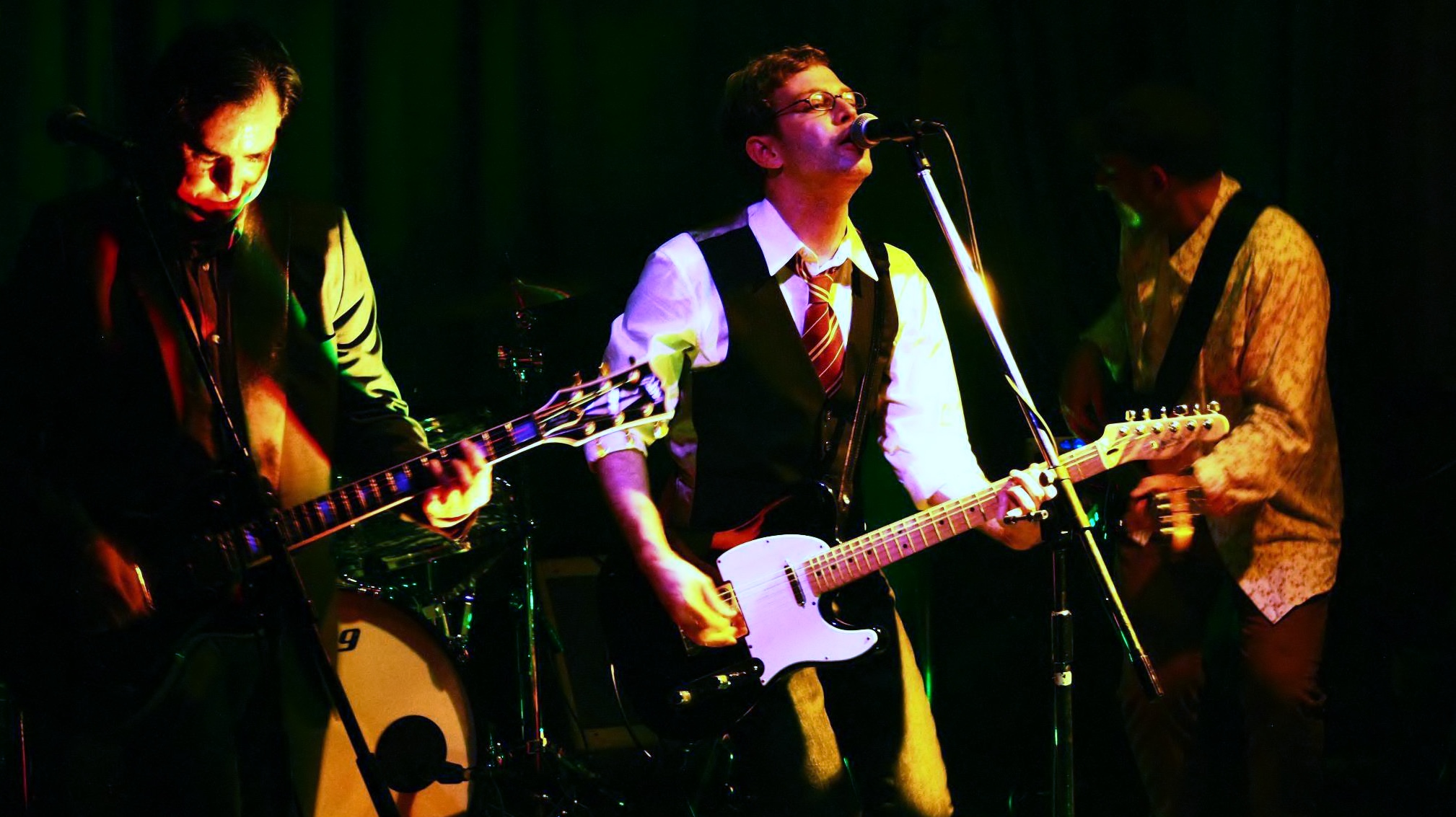
- The Bye Bye Blackbirds performing at The Starry Plough, Berkeley, CA, on September 21, 2013. L-R: Lenny Gill, Bradley Skaught, Aaron Rubin.

Background information
- Origin: Oakland, California, U.S.
- Genres: Indie rock, power pop
- Years active: 2005–
- Labels: American Dust, Rainbow Quartz
- Members: Bradley Skaught; Aaron Rubin; Lenny Gill; Joe Becker; KC Bowman; Kelly Atkins
- Past members: William Duke; Michael Derrick; Chuck Lindo; Ian Robertson; Ali Abbors; Charlie Crabtree; Andrew Wakefield; Ian Lee

The Bye Bye Blackbirds are an Oakland, California-based indie rock and power pop band, fronted by guitarist and vocalist Bradley Skaught. The San Francisco Chronicle described their work as "British Invasion guitar-pop with a twinge of country and roots," in which "disparate rock influences – '60s rock, '70s power pop, '80s college radio and indie rock – come together for catchy, harmony-laden songs."

Rock critic Tris McCall wrote that the band is "firmly established as one of the best and hardest-working independent power-pop outfits in Northern California," with songs that "contain monster singalong hooks."

== Background ==
Bradley Skaught, the group's 50-year-old principal songwriter and frontman, was originally from Tacoma, Washington. Skaught began taking drum lessons while in second grade. He later moved to Oakland, California, where his musical career included a stint as drummer for Yuji Oniki, after which Skaught became better known as a guitarist and vocalist. His vocals have been called "distinctive and lovely," "a unique drawl reminiscent of Tom Petty", and likened to John Lennon.

Skaught was the founder of the band Belle Da Gama, which included Ian Robertson. The name Belle Da Gama was taken from the Salman Rushdie novel The Moor's Last Sigh. Belle Da Gama recorded one album, Garden Abstract, released in 2001 on 125 Records.

In 2005, Skaught and Robertson disbanded Belle Da Gama and formed The Bye Bye Blackbirds. The new group was named after the 1926 jazz standard Bye Bye Blackbird. Skaught and Robertson, both guitarists, recruited drummer Lenny Gill and bass player William Duke online. In forming the new band, Skaught and Robertson decided on a "back-to-basics approach" based on "fundamental things we loved as listeners – songwriting, harmony, cool guitar parts and sounds."

== Recordings ==
=== Honeymoon (2006) ===
The Bye Bye Blackbirds released their debut recording, an EP called Honeymoon, in 2006. Bill Swan, of the indie band Beulah, produced the seven-song EP.

In a review, Richie Unterberger likened the songs to the "late-'70s power pop of Elvis Costello," also finding similarities in approach with Badfinger and the Beatles. Skaught later referred to Honeymoon as "a bit embarrassing to me, although I like a couple songs and I love the sound... It works to me as a kind of statement of intent, but it makes me squirm to hear it."

=== Apology Accepted and Houses and Homes (2008) ===
Houses and Homes
Review scores
Source	Rating
AllMusic	3.5/5 stars

The group released their second EP, Apology Accepted, and their first full-length album, Houses and Homes, on the American Dust label in 2008.

Unterberger likened Houses and Homes to British Invasion bands, with "tunes and the upper-register vocals [that] often echo some of the poppier Beatlesque groups of yore," praising the album's sensitive lyrics and "upbeat guitar-oriented pop/rock with a tinge of the bittersweet." In contrast to the album's dominant pop sound were the dreamy instrumental "Next Door", and the tenser, Brian Eno-like ambient track "Murray Morgan's Last Dream".

Skaught called Houses and Homes "satisfyingly better than Honeymoon to me.... We experimented a lot – goofy stuff with tape echoes and lots of layers." The bluegrass-tinged song "The Ghosts Are All Right" was featured in the book Music: What Happened?, which named it as a favorite for that year, describing the song as "a Byrds-worthy meditation on history and responsibility in a local community."

Apology Accepted, a download-only EP, included "Monster Eyes", a song written with novelist Jonathan Lethem from "lyrical fragments" of his novel You Don't Love Me Yet, and performed with Lethem at a reading. The title track of Apology Accepted was a cover of a song by The Go-Betweens.

=== Fixed Hearts (2011) ===
Fixed Hearts
Review scores
Source	Rating
AllMusic	4/5 stars

Before recording 2011's Fixed Hearts, bass player William Duke, who had previously shared songwriting responsibilities with Skaught, left the band. Skaught stated that writing all of the songs on Fixed Hearts was "liberating" and that the album benefited from his resulting confidence, and from the contributions of new bass player Aaron Rubin and producer Paul Tyler.

The title is a reference to drummer Lenny Gill's then-recent heart surgery, as well as to the protagonists of the songs, who emerge from heartbreak with their own hearts repaired.

Reviewing Fixed Hearts, the Aquarian Weekly cited the "general giddiness of the album", moving from a "nostalgic and swinging vibe" through songs with a "country-pop sound" and "pulsing drums", to the "peaceful" final tracks.

AllMusic's Jack Rabid wrote that the album had the "brightly ringing, polished/unthreatening, anodyne" 1960s pop vibe of a "groovy guitar pop party" where "nice guys finish first and get the girl in the finale." The review cited Skaught's "easy sincerity and the group's harmonic gifts," embracing a "Panglossian panoply of this period from when they were pups, cutting in country-pop, folk, and—heck yeah—a horns-laden opener with bits of Memphis soul."

=== We Need the Rain (2013) ===
We Need the Rain

Studio album by The Bye Bye Blackbirds
- Released: November 12, 2013
- Recorded: 2012–2013
- Length: 40:03
- Producer: Paul Tyler, KC Bowman

==== Production notes ====
The group's 2013 album, We Need the Rain, was produced by Paul Tyler, except for two tracks produced by KC Bowman (of Agony Aunts and Corner Laughers). The album marks Ian Robertson's final contributions as a member, prior to his departure to form a solo project, Black Butterfly Gang.

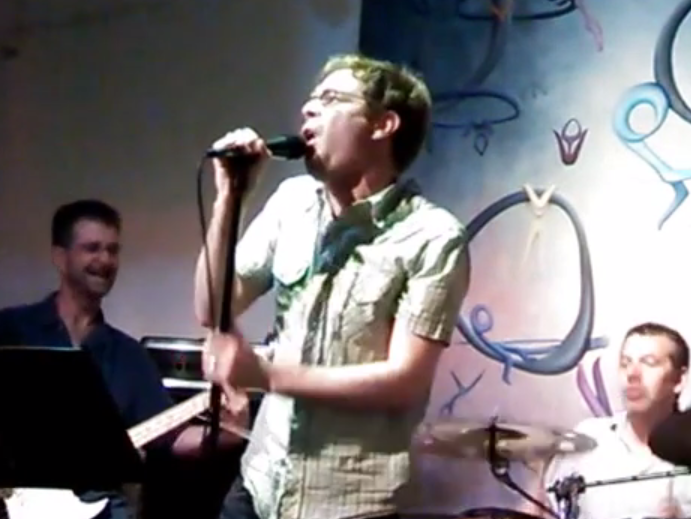
Bradley Skaught in July 2013, performing with Game Theory at memorial for Scott Miller

Skaught dedicated We Need the Rain to Scott Miller, his "musical mentor". Miller was not involved with the album, but Skaught told the San Francisco Chronicle that Miller's death in April 2013 was "the most painful and devastating blow", leading Skaught to consider the album "a kind of anchor, something to channel all that chaos through ... It's the first record we've made that we couldn't take to him and get that final vote of confidence on."

==== Critical response and reviews ====
We Need the Rain was named one of the "Top 20 Releases of 2013" by Goldmine, with critic John M. Borack citing guitars that "jangle, strum and get muscular when they need to."

The San Francisco Chronicle described the album as having "sweetly melancholy jingle-jangle and satisfyingly gutsy guitar and bass parts" with "soulful crunch." Reviewer Bill Kopp wrote in Musoscribe that "chiming guitars, ear candy hooks, punchy guitar riffage, tight vocal harmonies" provide the emotional and "visceral punch" of power pop. In Dirty Impound, Dennis Cook wrote, "Every tune practically shimmies out of the speakers, cool small details etched into ceaselessly ear-snagging melodies as sweet, gently yearning voices sing about love and the weather in ways that make both seem brand new."

According to Tris McCall of the Newark Star-Ledger, the album took a new and "more aggressive approach" in which "guitars still twinkle and shimmer, on occasion, but this time around, they growl, twist, stutter and snap, too." McCall wrote, "Although Skaught's essential optimism is always visible," this "isn't always a happy album," with songs "both more direct and more discontented" than Skaught's prior work. "Yet it is the deepest, gutsiest and most rewarding set in the band's discography, and it points the way forward for a project that once felt like a formal exercise in songcraft."

=== Take Out The Poison (2017) ===
==== Production notes ====
The 2017 album Take Out The Poison was recorded primarily by Scott Evans at Antisleep and Sharkbite Studios in Oakland, CA. The line-up of the band was in flux at this time and, as a result, the album features three different drummers: Charlie Crabtree, Ian Lee and Andrew Wakefield. It is the first of the band's albums for which Lenny Gill is the full-time lead guitarist. Take Out The Poison is notable for featuring three duets, with Lindsay Paige Garfield, Julie Wakefield and Olivia Mancini being the featured duet vocalists. The album is also the first by the band to feature a string section on two songs, arranged by Bay Area musician and composer Mark Clifford. A video for the first single, "Duet", was filmed in San Francisco by Mike Tittel, who also took the cover photograph.

==== Critical response and reviews ====
Commenting on the diversity of the material and the ambition in pursuing different sounds and styles, Musoscribe critic Bill Kopp wrote "this album revels in those seemingly incompatible forms." Tim Hiney at Dagger 'Zine wrote that songwriter Skaught "mines several decades of rock n’ roll and up comes up with another winner"

=== Boxer At Rest (2020) ===
==== Production notes ====
Boxer At Rest was recorded at Hyde Street Studios in San Francisco by engineer Chris von Sneidern and produced by Doug Gillard. It's the first album by the band to feature drummer Jozef Becker (notably of The Loud Family and Thin White Rope). Initial tracking for the record was done in early 2019 without guitarist Lenny Gill who had undergone a heart transplant and was still hospitalized at the time. After a full recovery, Lenny returned to the studio in late 2019 to add his lead guitar parts. Longtime collaborator Bill Swan returned to arrange the horns on "Baby It's Still You" and "You Were All Light". The album features the harmony vocals of Kelly Atkins extensively alongside those of KC Bowman.

==== Critical response and reviews ====
Don Valentine, writing for I Don't Hear A Single, wrote, "Boxer At Rest is a magnificent album, a proper album to be listened to from start to finish. It will definitely be up there at the end of year awards." Mike Baron wrote "If architecture is frozen music, the Blackbirds’ songs are fluid Frank Lloyd Wright or Charles Haertling, beautiful, inviting designs in which you want to live." Dave Franklin commented, "The secret of The Bye Bye Blackbirds sound seems to be that whilst they walk with the swagger of a rock band, they think with the precision of a pop outfit. And if they seem to tip their hats to a few past, pop greats, they do so whilst stepping confidently into the future..." In a Q&A at the Sweet Sweet Music blog, Skaught suggests the choice of Gillard as producer was in part because "we knew him a bit, but also he’s got this amazing body of work for decades and is also a brilliant songwriter." Speaking to Andrea Weiss at All Around Records, Skaught explains the thematic origins of the songs on the album as a combination of personal losses and struggles in society and community: "You know, we’ve lost some really good friends and people from our musical circles, and on top of that the struggles of our times and places – the political landscape, wealth disparity, gentrification, this feeling of things fraying around the edges. I think a lot of just living in Oakland has fed into these songs – Ghost Ship, homeless encampments in public spaces, venues closing, people on the margins pushed even further out. I think the songs sit right where the personal and the public are the same thing."

== Discography ==
=== Albums and EPs ===
Year	Title	Details	Format	Label
2006	Honeymoon	No. / Title / Length; 1. / "In Every Season" / 4:08; 2. / "After Work" / 3:16; 3. / "Weekend Folks" / 2:53; 4. / "Needle-in-a-Haystack Girls" / 4:38; 5. / "How I Knew It Wasn't Love" / 5:19; 6. / "Suit & Make-Up" / 3:25; 7. / "Quiet Confusion" / 4:38	EP	self-released
2008	Apology Accepted	No. / Title / Length; 1. / "Apology Accepted"; 2. / "Monster Eyes"; 3. / "Leave a Light On (Acoustic)"; 4. / "In Every Season (Acoustic)"	EP	American Dust (DAD-106)
2008	Houses and Homes	No. / Title / Length; 1. / "The Ghosts Are Alright" / 5:02; 2. / "Shed the Skin" / 2:50; 3. / "In Stereo" / 4:57; 4. / "Edge of Town" / 3:59; 5. / "Next Door" / 2:17; 6. / "Original Lights" / 3:10; 7. / "It Only Costs a Dime" / 2:10; 8. / "Leave a Light On" / 3:50; 9. / "Murray Morgan's Last Dream" / 5:08	CD	American Dust (DAD-107)
2011	Fixed Hearts	No. / Title / Length; 1. / "Elizabeth Park" / 3:18; 2. / "Open a Light" / 3:54; 3. / "Jack Frost" / 4:44; 4. / "New River Sunset" / 4:03; 5. / "Hats" / 3:18; 6. / "Every Night at Noon" / 4:52; 7. / "Mermaids" / 3:07; 8. / "Kiss the World" / 3:18; 9. / "Through the Clouds" / 3:02; 10. / "Hawaii" / 3:07; 11. / "Silver Sands" / 5:06	CD	Rainbow Quartz
2013	We Need The Rain	All tracks are written by Bradley Skaught (BMI) except as noted.: No. / Title / Writer(s) / Length; 1. / "All in Light" / / 3:50; 2. / "Like a Thief" / Bradley Skaught and Ian Robertson (BMI) / 4:53; 3. / "Don't Come Back Now" / / 4:00; 4. / "Butterfly Drinks" / / 3:16; 5. / "Brand New Sitting Still" / Bradley Skaught and Paula Carino (BMI/ASCAP) / 4:49; 6. / "Waiting for the Drums" / / 2:37; 7. / "Secret Ride" / / 3:15; 8. / "Broad Daylight" / Fraser/Rodgers (Blue Mountain Music Ltd/PRS) / 3:14; 9. / "Shook Down Softly" / / 3:44; 10. / "Spin Your Stars" / Bradley Skaught and Lindsay Paige Garfield (BMI) / 6:25	LP, CD	self-released
2017	Take Out the Poison	All tracks are written by Bradley Skaught (BMI) except as noted.: No. / Title / Writer(s) / Length; 1. / "Earl Grey Kisses"; 2. / "Let Your Hair Fall Down"; 3. / "Duet" / Bradley Skaught & Lindsay Paige Garfield (BMI) / 2:51; 4. / "Wasted"; 5. / "I Meant To Write"; 6. / "Alfred Starr Hamilton"; 7. / "Baby We're Fine"; 8. / "Broken Falls"; 9. / "Your Spell Is Too Late"; 10. / "Poison Love" / Mrs. Elmer Laird; 11. / "Earl Grey Kisses (Reprise)"	LP, CD	self-released
2019	Boxer At Rest		LP, CD	self-released
2022	August Lightning Complex		LP, CD	self-released

=== Various artists compilations ===
Year	Title	Details	Format	Label
2009	Crayon Angel: A Tribute to the Music of Judee Sill	Track 12: "There's a Rugged Road" (4:04)	CD	American Dust (DAD-109)

=== Singles ===
Year	Artist	Title	Format	Label
2014	Dr. Frank & The Bye Bye Blackbirds	"Even Hitler Had A Girlfriend" b/w "Population: Us"	7" single	Good Land Records
2015	The Bye Bye Blackbirds	"Let Your Hair Fall Down" b/w "These Blues"	digital single	self-released
