= The Hill (Richard Buckner album) =

Studio album by Richard Buckner
- Released: 2000
- Studio: Wavelab, Tucson Arizona, and "A Secret Location"
- Length: 34:02
- Label: Overcoat, Merge
- Producer: JD Foster

Richard Buckner chronology
| Since (1998) | The Hill (2000) | Impasse (2002) |

The Hill is the fourth studio album by Richard Buckner, setting poems from Edgar Lee Masters' 1915 Spoon River Anthology to music. It was released by Overcoat Records in 2000, and re-released by Merge Records in 2015.

== Background ==
In PopMatters, Lee Zimmerman wrote about "the album’s genesis. It was inspired by Buckner's stay at a scruffy, out of the way motel near the mouth of Death Valley, California, a week that found him bereft of a phone, TV or any other modern conveniences. With only his guitar and a copy of the anthology to help him pass the time, he worked up a few of the poems, recorded them on cassette and promptly forgot about what he had compiled. It wasn't until an acquaintance discovered the demos in Buckner's truck four years later, that the album actually came to life."

== Recording ==
Brian Howe wrote in Pitchfork, "In 1996, Buckner recorded The Hill while taking a break from recording Devotion + Doubt, but didn't do anything with it until the tape surfaced in his truck four years later. With a guitar, an E-bow, and a keyboard, he entered the studio with Calexico's Joey Burns and John Convertino, but forbade them any traditional percussion. Burns played cello, and Convertino improvised percussion from things around the studio."

== Reception ==
For Trouser Press, Eric Hage wrote, "It's a tribute to Buckner's rugged individualism that he emerged from his major-label dance to put together The Hill, one sprawling, 34-minute track based on early 20th century poet Edgar Lee Masters' Spoon River Anthology (character pieces in which the dead in an Illinois graveyard ruminate on their often tragic lives)... The moody ruralism and tragic themes fit snugly in his canon; he crafts some gorgeously heart-piercing numbers from the ancient grief of such poems as 'Julia Miller' and 'Elizabeth Childers' and adds various sorts of haunting ephemera, including slow, rusty organ and wisps of feedback."

Mark Deming of AllMusic wrote, "The Hill is a sterling example of Buckner's gifts as an interpretive performer, an area he doesn't explore often, and he brilliantly inhabits the characters of Masters' poems, especially the drunken and luckless 'Oscar Hummel,' the eloquently lovelorn 'Reuben Pantier,' and a mother to be shorn of all hope, 'Elizabeth Childers.' With The Hill, Richard Buckner began stepping out in a new creative direction, and if the album isn't as immediately effective or consistent as his first three offerings, at its best this is as powerful and poignant as anything he's ever released."

In PopMatters, Lee Zimmerman said, "It's an eerie concept, but as a piece of sepia-tinted folk art, it works remarkably well. While all the songs, whether instrumental interludes or clipped acoustic ballads, are of the bare-boned variety, Buckner’s yearning delivery and the musical assists from Calexico’s Joey Burns and John Convertino turn these tracks into moving and memorable expressions of significant consequence. So even while the album is best considered as a whole, each selection stands out as a singular yet intimate encounter."

Brian Howe, writing for Pitchfork, called the music "raucous and immediate, with many chorus-less songs abruptly slamming into one another...and the numerous, interstitial instrumentals mean we get fewer actual songs."

== Track listing ==
- Words from Edgar Lee Masters' 1915 book of poetry Spoon River Anthology, music by Richard Buckner.
1. Mrs Merritt (instrumental)
2. Tom Merritt
3. Elmer Karr (instrumental)
4. Ollie McGee
5. Fletcher McGee (instrumental)
6. Julia Miller
7. Willard Fluke (instrumental)
8. Elizabeth Childers
9. A. D. Blood (instrumental)
10. Oscar Hummel
11. Mellie Clark (instrumental)
12. Johnnie Sayre
13. Dora Williams (instrumental)
14. Reuben Pantier
15. Emily Sparks (instrumental)
16. Amanda Barker
17. The Hill (instrumental)
18. William + Emily

== Personnel ==
- Richard Buckner – vocals, various instruments
- Joey Burns – cello, arco bass
- John Convertino – percussion
- JD Foster– producer
- Craig Schumacher – engineer
- Jon Marshall Smith – mastering
- Penny Jo Buckner – scratchboard artwork
