= The Vulgar Boatmen =

Rock band from Florida, US

- Origin: Gainesville, Florida, U.S.
- Genre: Rock
- Years active: 1982–present

The Vulgar Boatmen are an American rock band.

== History ==
The Vulgar Boatmen were formed in Gainesville, Florida, in 1982 by a group of students at the University of Florida, including John Eder and Walter Salas-Humara, later of The Silos. In its original configuration the group issued several cassette-only releases, including Women and Boatmen First (1982) and All Bands on Deck (1984). As first Eder and then Salas-Humara departed, the group coalesced around Robert Ray, a film studies professor at the university, who became one of the group's two principal songwriters and vocalists, the other being Indiana musician Dale Lawrence, a former student of Ray's who was a veteran of the early punk band the Gizmos. The band was named as a play on the Russian folk song The Volga Boatmen.

Though they lived and worked in different states, Ray and Lawrence composed songs by exchanging cassette tapes through the mail. Eventually Lawrence merged his own band, Right to Left, into the Boatmen, who until that time had existed as two distinct performing units. In their revised lineup the Boatmen are known for their straightforward but infectious pop melodies, stark lyrics — many of which focus on women, trains, and automobile travel — and frequent employment of the viola, an instrument relatively uncommon in rock. At least sixteen musicians have been members of the group at one time or another. In addition to Robert Ray and his wife, violist Helen Kirklin, the core of the Florida (recording) branch included Carey Crane (vocals), Jonathan Kaley-Isley (drums, organ, guitar, vocals), and Michael Derry (guitar and drums). Core members of the Indiana (touring) Boatmen include Dale Lawrence, Kathy Kolata (viola), Andy Richards (drums), Jake Smith (bass), and Matt Speake (guitar).

Since 1989 the Boatmen have recorded three albums, You and Your Sister (1989), Please Panic (1992), and Opposite Sex (1995), the last of which was released by Warner Bros (East/West) in the UK and Europe, but was never released in the US. In 2018, all three albums were reissued by the Berlin-label play loud! productions, with liner notes by Bill Wyman (You and Your Sister), Charles Taylor (Please Panic), and Ira Robins (Opposite Sex). In 2003, the band issued a compilation album on CD, Wide Awake. As of 2020, the Indiana branch of the Boatmen remains active under the leadership of Lawrence.

== Legacy ==
Author Jonathan Lethem titled his 2007 novel You Don't Love Me Yet in honor of two (otherwise unconnected) songs of the same title by Roky Erickson and The Vulgar Boatmen.

In 2010, Fred Uhter released a documentary about the group, entitled Drive Somewhere: The Saga of the Vulgar Boatmen.

== Discography ==
- Women and Boatmen First (1982)
- All Bands on Deck (1983)
- You and Your Sister (1989; re-issue with bonus tracks 2015)
- Please Panic (1992)
- Here No Evil: A Tribute to the Monkees (1992)
- Opposite Sex (1995)
- Opposite Sex – UK EP (1996)
- Wide Awake (2004)
