= Surrounded (Richard Buckner album) =

Studio album by Richard Buckner
- Released: September 3, 2013
- Genre: Folk
- Length: 33:44
- Label: Merge
- Producer: Tucker Martine

Richard Buckner chronology
| Our Blood (2011) | Surrounded (2013) |

Surrounded is a studio album by singer-songwriter Richard Buckner. It was released in September 2013 under Merge Records. The album incorporates electronic textures into Buckner's moody folk rock, creating a sound AllMusic's Fred Thomas described as "ambient Americana."

== Critical reception ==
Professional ratings
Aggregate scores
| Source | Rating |
|---|---|
| Metacritic | 71/100 |
Review scores
| Source | Rating |
| AllMusic | 3.5/5 stars |
| Pitchfork | 7.7/10 |

Describing the textures of the recordings, Fred Thomas of AllMusic wrote, "Buckner wrote all nine compositions here with the uncommon instrumentation of an electronic autoharp and an octave-shifting pedal, fleshing the tunes out for recording with more familiar instrumentation. The result could definitely be seen as ambient Americana, with cloudy electronic textures filling in the usually empty spaces in his spare and lonely folk tunes." Brian Howe of Pitchfork wrote, "For 20 years, Richard Buckner has elusively drifted through alt-country, electric folk, acoustic rock. Over the past decade, he has shrouded his abstract singer/songwriter music with vast, ominously serene arrangements. But no matter which way Buckner tacks, he always contrasts imagery so nonfigurative it seems shaped from vapor with tactile, oaken music. His deep-grained acoustic guitar playing is splintery as a raw plank. His voice is a long gnarled shape with a silky finish, like a sea-polished branch, and gives a roughshod impression that belies its smooth range and secure pitch."

== Track listing ==
| No. | Title | Length |
|---|---|---|
| 1. | "Surrounded" | 2:49 |
| 2. | "When You Tell Me How It Is" | 4:28 |
| 3. | "Beautiful Question" | 2:52 |
| 4. | "Foundation" | 3:16 |
| 5. | "Portrait" | 3:11 |
| 6. | "Mood" | 4:35 |
| 7. | "Go" | 2:34 |
| 8. | "Cut" | 4:17 |
| 9. | "Lean To" | 5:42 |
