= You and Your Sister (album) =

Studio album by the Vulgar Boatmen
- Released: 1989
- Length: 46:18
- Label: Record Collect
- Producers: Walter Salas-Humara, Robert Ray

The Vulgar Boatmen chronology
You and Your Sister (1989)	Please Panic (1992)

You and Your Sister is the debut album by the American band the Vulgar Boatmen, released in 1989. The Vulgar Boatmen, at the time of the album, constituted two bands: one based in Florida and one based in Indiana. The band supported the album with a North American tour. "Drive Somewhere" was released as a single. The album was reissued in 2018 by the Berlin-based label play loud! productions, with liner notes by Bill Wyman.

== Production ==
The album's songs were written by Dale Lawrence and Robert Ray. Ray, based in Florida, and Lawrence, based in Indiana, sent songs through the mail. Aside from a few tracks recorded in Indiana, the majority of the album was made at Ray's Gainesville, Florida, home studio. You and Your Sister was coproduced by Ray and Walter Salas-Humara.

== Critical reception ==
Professional ratings
Review scores
Source	Rating
AllMusic	4.5/5 stars
Chicago Tribune	3.5/4 stars
Robert Christgau	B+
The Encyclopedia of Popular Music	3/5 stars
MusicHound Rock: The Essential Album Guide	4/5 stars
The Rolling Stone Album Guide	3.5/5 stars
Spin Alternative Record Guide	9/10
The Tampa Tribune	3/4 stars

Robert Christgau wrote: "These guys make much more than you expect out of what first sounds like almost nothing--just tuneful enough to warrant play two, their mild jangle gains sweetness and kick as your faith increases." The Chicago Tribune thought that "all of it—even the rhythmically powerful songs—is somehow quiet; it`s the dreamy, heart-tugging stuff that drifts in from another room late at night." Greil Marcus, in The Village Voice, called the songs "very '50s in their casualness, present-day in their insistence on doubt." The Boston Globe said that "the band creates its own, often lethargic sound that, after a half-dozen listens, makes perfect sense."

AllMusic wrote that "a dozen near-perfect roots pop tunes ... address simple concerns, like driving and changing the world all around, to a steady four-four beat that just about accomplishes that latter feat with only the occasional syncopated accent." The New Yorker thought that "the sound in general was what you’d call 'organic'—you could basically hear the guitars being strummed, the drums occasionally snapped, the almost-resigned naturalness of the lead singer’s voice, the plaintiveness of the melodies."

== Track listing ==
No.	Title	Length
1.	"Mary Jane"	3:53
2.	"You and Your Sister"	4:06
3.	"Margaret Says"	4:40
4.	"Katie"	2:55
5.	"Drive Somewhere"	6:00
6.	"Decision by the Airport"	4:04
7.	"Change the World All Around"	4:10
8.	"Fallen Down"	3:36
9.	"Hold Me Tight"	3:38
10.	"Cry Real Tears"	2:14
11.	"Drink More Coffee"	2:58
12.	"The Street Where You Live"	4:04
