= Happy Foot Sad Foot sign =

Neighborhood landmark in Los Angeles

- "Sad Foot" side of the sign
- Location: Los Feliz, Los Angeles, California
- Intersection: Sunset Blvd / Benton Wy
- Interactive map of Happy Foot Sad Foot sign
- Coordinates: 34°4′50.685″N 118°16′13.298″W
- Sign relocated to Y Que Trading Post, 1770 N Vermont Ave, Los Angeles

"Happy Foot" side of the sign

The Happy Foot Sad Foot sign (also written Happy Foot/Sad Foot sign) was an advertising sign for a podiatry clinic in Los Angeles, California, United States. Known locally as a fortune-telling device and neighborhood landmark, the sign continuously rotated to show two sides: one with a cartoon of an injured foot with an unhappy face, and the other side with a cartoon of a smiling and healthy foot. A local superstition held that if a person saw the sad side first, this was an omen of bad luck for the day, while seeing the happy side first suggested good luck for the day. Authors of novels and other creative works have incorporated the sign into stories, including Jonathan Lethem and David Foster Wallace.

The sign was installed in about 1985 for the Sunset Foot Clinic at Sunset Boulevard and Benton Way on the border between the Silver Lake and Echo Park neighborhoods of Los Angeles. The podiatrists who owned the clinic said that the sign successfully attracted customers. After the clinic lost its lease in 2019 and moved to a new location, a local shop owner put the sign on display in his store, Y-Que Trading Post, in the nearby neighborhood of Los Feliz.

== Sign ==
The sign revolved to show two sides with "Foot Clinic", the clinic's phone number, and illustrations. The sad side has an illustration of a anthropomorphized foot with a distressed look on its face, small arms holding itself up on crutches, and a bandage around a toe. The toes appear to be the face's hair. The happy side has a foot with a triumphant face and no injuries, wearing sneakers and Mickey Mouse-style gloves. On both sides, the foot has its own small legs and feet. The surreal humor of the sign is part of its appeal for fans.

=== Installation and operation ===
After the Sunset Foot Clinic opened in 1985 at 2711 W. Sunset Boulevard, the podiatrist who owned it installed a version of the sign with a light-skinned foot on a pink background, based on a sketch by a patient. The original version can be seen in the 1993 documentary Silverlake Life: The View from Here. The sign fell down in late 1993 and was replaced with the more famous version, using a foot redrawn by the podiatrist's son. Due to ink problems while printing the redrawn foot, it was colored dark brown. The podiatry practice was in a mini-mall with a motel and a restaurant. Sunset Boulevard is a major thoroughfare, and in this area it has a wide range of small businesses in retail plazas with signs intended to catch the attention of drivers and other passers-by.

Clinic staff said that some patients chose to try the clinic for foot care because they liked the sign. A podiatrist who owned the clinic said in 2019 that the brown foot seemed to reflect that the neighborhood had many Latino and Filipino residents when the clinic opened. He said that the majority of his clients were Latino when he took over the practice in 2007, but many of his former clients had moved away due to increasing prices in the neighborhood.

=== Relocation ===
Sunset Foot Clinic said in July 2019 that it planned to move to Rampart Village in September because the property owner did not renew the clinic's lease. Area residents created a petition to ask the property owner to preserve the sign and to encourage designating the sign as a Los Angeles Historic-Cultural Monument. The clinic owner wanted to display the sign at the new clinic location but needed approval from the new landlord.

The owner of Y-Que Trading Post, a T-shirt shop and gift shop in Los Feliz that sells merchandise depicting the sign, got permission from the clinic owner to take the two sides of the sign and display them inside his store. He moved the large pieces of the sign with help from friends. The store has a wheel that visitors can spin to see if they land on Happy Foot or Sad Foot.

A new restaurant opened in the former clinic space, a sports bar with Indian food, operated by the property owner's son.

== Cultural impact ==
Video of sign rotating while cars drive by

The sign was nicknamed Happy Foot Sad Foot and described as an omen by the late 1990s: seeing the happy side first meant good luck or reassurance, and seeing the sad side first meant bad luck. A Spin article about Beck in 1994 said that "he and his roommates would sit around at dusk, drinking beers and waiting for the sign to stop spinning. If the sign came to a halt and the happy side faced the house...they'd head out for action, but if the sad foot pointed in their direction, they'd call it a night." In later years, the sign continued to rotate after business hours.

The sign was at the edge between the Silver Lake and Echo Park neighborhoods. Some locals started calling this area HaFo/SaFo, short for Happy Foot/Sad Foot, around 2010. Neighborhood residents sometimes dress up as the foot for Halloween.

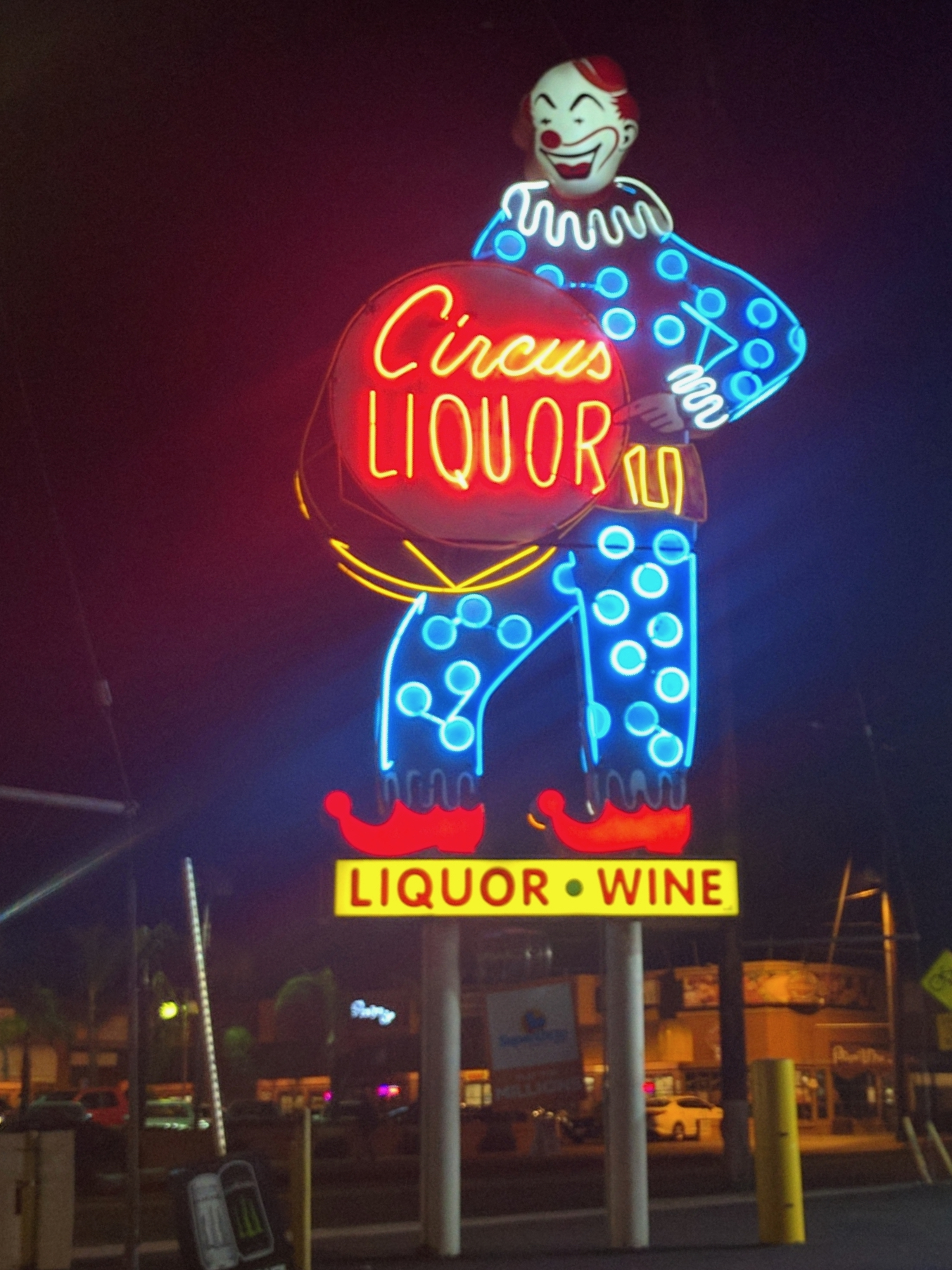
Circus Liquor sign, another roadside landmark in Los Angeles

Fans consider the Happy Foot Sad Foot sign part of local lore and nostalgia related to roadside advertising in Los Angeles, like Googie architecture, the Brown Derby, and Felix Chevrolet. It was one of many unconventional commercial landmarks in the region, like the Circus Liquor sign in North Hollywood, Chicken Boy in Highland Park, and the big donuts of Southern California. A local artist described the Happy Foot Sad Foot sign as "a connection to a kooky, weirder time in the neighborhood" and "not market-tested". A writer for LAist described the sign as more beloved by locals than the Hollywood Sign.

=== Novels ===
In the 2007 novel You Don't Love Me Yet by Jonathan Lethem, the main character lives nearby and interprets the sign as "an eternal marriage of opposites, the emblem of some ancient foot-based philosophical system"; she uses it as a kind of coin flip to help her make decisions. The novel The Pale King by David Foster Wallace, published in 2011, sets a version of the revolving sign in Chicago, where college students use the position of the sign to decide whether to do homework. There is also a reference to the sign in Tomorrow, and Tomorrow, and Tomorrow (2022), a novel by Gabrielle Zevin.

=== Music, film, and television ===
In 2008 the band Eels released a song, "Sad Foot Sign", with lyrics including "Sad foot sign, why you gotta taunt me this way; the happy side is broken now; it's gonna be an awful day". The song reflects that the sign sometimes broke and stopped rotating for a while.

The band YACHT used an animated story about the Happy Foot Sad Foot sign, created by Mike Hollingsworth, as the music video for its song "Hard World" in 2018. Singer Claire L. Evans said, "We believe in the half-assed urban legends that all Angelenos east of La Brea believe, which is that there's some kind of prophetic quality to it."

The animated television series Teen Titans Go! had an episode in 2021 set in Silver Lake, featuring the Happy Foot Sad Foot sign and a podiatrist as part of the plot.

A filmmaker made a short documentary film about the sign, including interviews with the podiatrists from the clinic, released in 2025.

=== Art and merchandise ===
An art show in 2013 at Machine Project, a community event space, included a project "to see if the sign's two-sided message indeed has the ability to predict a good or bad day". The show, which was part of a Getty Foundation initiative about modern architecture in Los Angeles, also included a choral performance below the sign and a website with a simulation of the sign. Artist Barbara Thomason included a painting of the sign in her book 100 Not So Famous Views of L.A. (2014).

The clinic did not make official merchandise, but the owner as of 2019 did not mind people selling T-shirts, pins, and other items inspired by the sign. A shop in Culver City sold Happy Foot and Sad Foot enamel pins in 2015. Y-Que Trading Post, the location of the relocated sign, sells Happy Foot Sad Foot merchandise.

== See also ==
- Sense of place
- Vernacular culture
