= Dents and Shells =

Studio album by Richard Buckner
- Released: October 12, 2004
- Studio: Wavelab, Tucson, Arizona; Tophat, Austin, Texas; Various hotels and hovels
- Length: 34:35
- Label: Merge
- Producer: Craig Schumacher, John Harvey

Richard Buckner chronology
| Impasse (2002) | Dents and Shells (2004) | Meadow (2006) |

Dents and Shells is the sixth album by singer-songwriter Richard Buckner, released in 2004 by Merge Records.

== Release ==
Dents and Shells was released in October 2004. Merge Records celebrated the album's fifteenth anniversary with a re-release on white vinyl in 2019.

== Reception ==
In an 8/10 Pitchfork review, Brian Howe wrote, "Since that first album, Buckner has created increasingly more ephemeral, impressionistic gradations of tone and mood. Dents and Shells continues to explore Buckner's shadowy continent of song, a Symbolist mirror-world where bright glints of detail fleetingly flash, then submerge, cloaked in shifting fogs... While strongly rooted in classic folk, Buckner's songs are rendered pristinely strange by their smallness and smeariness-- they're vast, dim topographies described by chords that are barely there, recondite realms of visions and visitations."

In a 3.5 star review comparing Buckner to Elliott Smith and Lou Reed, Darcie Stevens of the Austin Chronicle wrote, "Without elation or regret, Buckner speaks stories, explanations of missteps and wrong turns, contemplations of lost loves and past lives. Dents and Shells is the travelogue of such a road-worn songwriter. A beater of a vehicle with more miles than an odometer can count, Buckner is what he writes."

Gregory McIntosh of AllMusic described Buckner as "grizzly, conceptual, fragmented, brooding, and plaintive."

== Track listing ==
All songs written by Richard Buckner.

1. A Chance Counsel
2. Firsts
3. Invitation
4. Straight
5. Her
6. Charmers
7. Fuse
8. Rafters
9. Picture Day
10. As the Waves Will Always Roll

== Personnel ==
- Richard Buckner – guitar, vocals
- Bukka Allen
- King Coffey – drums
- Eric Conn
- Andrew Duplantis – bass
- Mike Hardwick – pedal steel
- Morales
- Gary Newcomb – pedal steel
- Jacob Shulze – guitar
- Brian Standefer
- Artwork by Andrew DeGraff
