= Austin Lounge Lizards =

American folk/country band

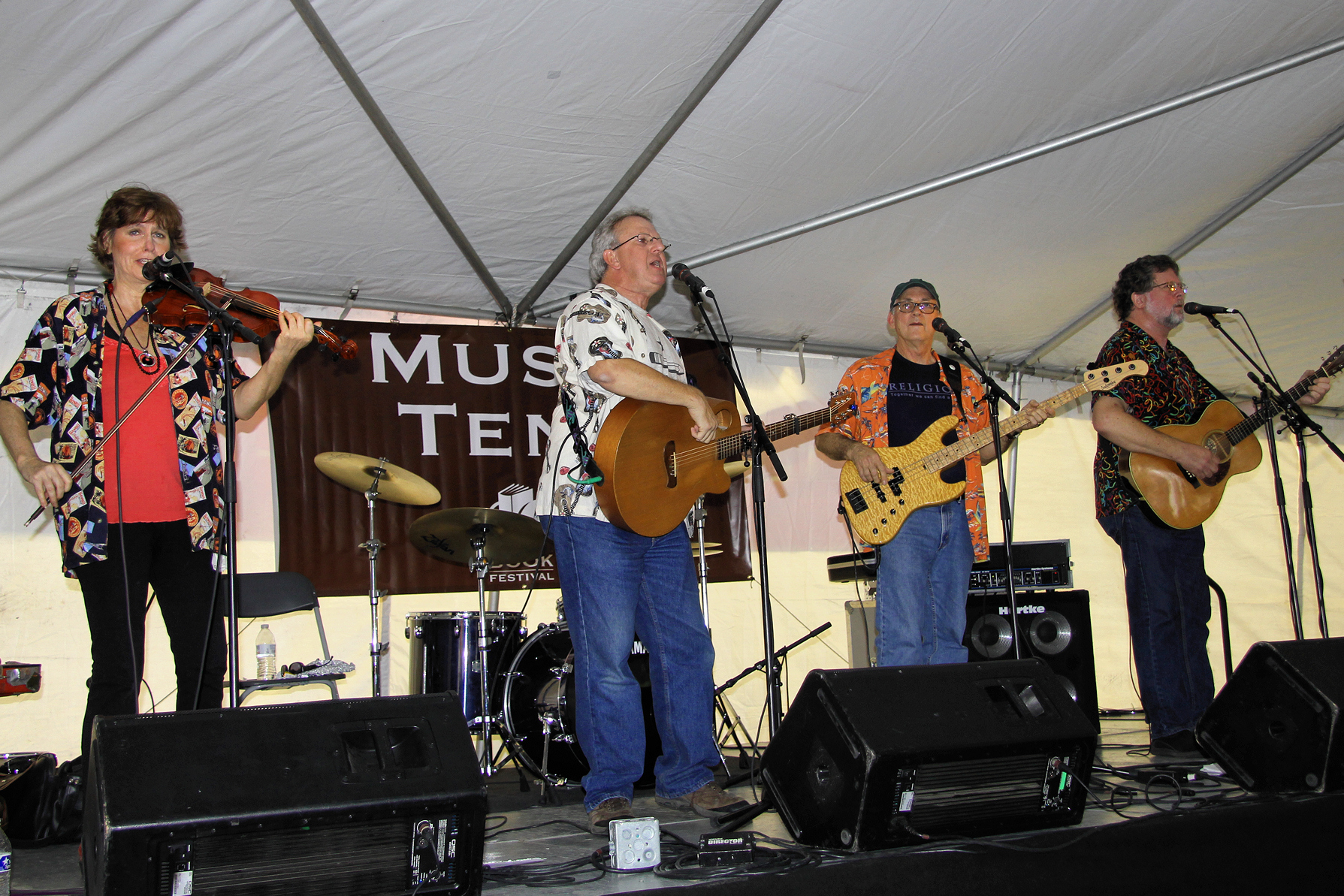
- The Austin Lounge Lizards at the 2013 Texas Book Festival

Background information
- Genres: Progressive bluegrass, Satire,
- Years active: 1980 – present
- Labels: Watermelon, Sugar Hill, Flying Fish
- Members: Hank Card, Conrad Deisler, Tim Wilson, Kirk Williams
- Past members: Tom Pittman, Richard Bowden, Darcie Deaville, Bruce Jones, Boo Resnick, Paul Sweeney, Mike Stevens, Todd Jagger, Clem Rowand, Korey Simeone, Eamon McLoughlin, Lex Browning, Tom Ellis, Julieann Banks
- Website: austinlizards.com

The Austin Lounge Lizards are a musical group from Austin, Texas, formed in 1980. The band includes founding members Hank Card and Conrad Deisler, along with Tim Wilson and Kirk Williams. The third founding member, Tom Pittman, retired from the band in the spring of 2011.

The band started out experimenting with folk, but was still heavily country in its style, combining the bluegrass form with which Pittman was familiar with the progressive-themed folk rock to which Card and Deisler had been accustomed. Between the members, a large number of different instruments have been played, including a rich variety of string instruments such as the banjo, mandolin, and fiddle.

The band got its name because, Deisler explained, "I think it was a slang term I'd heard my grandmother use to describe gentlemen of easy virtue who hung around in bars. When we started out, that's just what we were doing—hanging out and playing for beer and tips and stuff like that." The Austin Lounge Lizards began by playing covers, but eventually they wanted to move towards trying to write their own songs.

== Songwriting and sound ==
All the group's members contribute to songwriting, but the two principal songwriters have been Card and Deisler. Card's lyrics often rely on clever word plays, double entendres, and off-beat but sometimes poignant narratives about ordinary life. His most frequent subject matter is love, especially comically forlorn yearning (Example: "The Dogs, They Really Miss You"). Deisler's lyrics, in contrast, focus on the existentially absurd, often combining absurdly unexpected pairings (such as making Richard Petty the subject of a surreal Luis Buñuel film) as well as pitiable, sometimes lovable characters bewilderingly unaware of their own absurdity and oddness (Examples: "Wendell the Uncola Man" or "Old Blevins"). A recurring theme is the inanity of country music clichés, for example the "we were happier when we were poor" trope exaggerated into absurdity in "Love in a Refrigerator Box". Deisler's lyrics also marry comedy with a remarkably dark vision of humanity and its future (Example: Bonfire of the Inanities).

The sound became less country and progressed more to politically aware songs. The songs they wrote tended to be humorous in an extremely off-beat way, in addition to their political nature, in a way reminiscent of Country Joe McDonald's "Fixing to Die Rag". These songs tend to have primarily liberal messages, "The Ballad of Ronald Reagan", criticizes the Republican American president, while "Gingrich the Newt" criticizes the then-Speaker of the United States House of Representatives, Newt Gingrich. Their song, "Saguaro", co-written by Ann Clardy and Michael Stevens (former bass player), is based on the story of David Grundman, who died from shooting a cactus (see cactus plugging).

== Discography ==
- Creatures From the Black Saloon (1984)
- The Highway Cafe of the Damned (1988)
- Lizard Vision (1991)
- Paint Me on Velvet (1993)
- Small Minds (1995)
- Employee of the Month (1998)
- Live Bait (1999)
- Never an Adult Moment (2000)
- Strange Noises in the Dark (2003)
- The Drugs I Need (2006)
- Home and Deranged (2013)

== See also ==
- Music of Austin
- Drugs I Need
