= Since (album) =

Studio album by Richard Buckner
- Released: 1998
- Studios: Baby Monster, New York NY
- Length: 37:02
- Label: MCA
- Producer: JD Foster

Richard Buckner chronology
Devotion + Doubt (1997)	Since (1998)	The Hill (2000)

Since is the third studio album by Richard Buckner. It was released by MCA records in 1998.

== Background and writing ==
"Jewelbomb" and "Boys the Night Will Bury You" were written during the composition of Devotion + Doubt. Early vocal/acoustic recordings of these two songs appear in a collection of 1996 demos (released by Overcoat Records in 2000 as a self-titled album).

== Reception ==
In a 4-star AllMusic review, Michael Gallucci wrote, "Richard Buckner's follow-up to his 1997 divorce odyssey Devotion + Doubt is a more upbeat affair, with questions of faith and being tossed into the electric mix. Moving from contemplative singer-songwriter treks ('Once') to blurry guitar rave-ups ('Believer')... Yet, for all of the creeping positivity going on within the grooves, Buckner sounds more weary than ever, his already delicate voice cracking under the pressure as he trudges his way through his own brand of electric folk music."

Eric Hage wrote in Trouser Press, "Since shakes off the previous outing's downer trip, with many of the tracks fleshed out into full alt-rock bluster. There's still plenty of acoustic rumination, but the album is characterized by such rave-ups as 'Jewelbomb,' 'Believer' and 'Goner w/ Souvenir.'"

For Entertainment Weekly, Will Hermes gave the album an 'A' rating, calling it a "stunner" with Buckner's voice "keening and careening like George Jones gone haywire."

In the Washington Post, Geoffrey Himes is confused by Buckner's intentions for the album, saying "he throws together cryptic phrases with little thought as to whether they cohere", "his voice constantly strays from its intended path and pitch", and that he "sings in such a flattened mumble that no emotions escape other than depressed ennui."

== Track listing ==
- All songs written by Richard Buckner.
1. Believer
2. Faithful Shooter
3. Ariel Ramirez
4. Jewelbomb
5. The Ocean Cliff Clearing
6. Goner w/ Souvenir
7. Slept
8. Pico
9. Coursed
10. Lucky Buzz
11. 10-Day Room
12. Brief & Boundless
13. Raze
14. Hand @ the Hem
15. Boys, the Night Will Bury You
16. Once

== Personnel ==
- Richard Buckner – guitar, vocals
- John McEntire – drums, percussion
- Chris Cochrane – guitar
- Dave Schramm – guitar
- Eric Heywood – pedal steel guitar
- David Grubbs – piano, organ
- JD Foster – producer, bass, moog, percussion, guitar, piano, mandolin
