= Drugs I Need =

Satirical animated short film

The Drugs I Need is a satirical animated short made by The Animation Farm and the Austin Lounge Lizards and produced by the Consumers Union.

== Plot ==
The animation parodies a regular pharmaceutical television commercial, detailing the benefits the fictional drug Progenitorivox manufactured by fictional company SquabbMerlCo whose use is not described in detail. Instead, a large number of side effects are sung to an upbeat musical jingle, which emphasizes that the consumer should buy Progenitorivox— even if the generic drug is half the cost— if only to be like a family on TV. The animation ends with a seemingly random disclaimer, also a parody of pharmaceutical or "drug" advertisements.

== Reception ==
The video won the Public Affairs Council's Grassroots Innovation Award in 2006.
