= Crayon Angel: A Tribute to the Music of Judee Sill =

2009 compilation album by various artists

Crayon Angel: A Tribute To The Music of Judee Sill

Compilation album by Various Artists
- Released: September 22, 2009
- Recorded: 2007–2009
- Genre: Folk
- Label: American Dust

Professional ratings
Review scores
Source	Rating
Allmusic	4/5 stars
Pitchfork	(6.0/10.0) link

Crayon Angel: A Tribute To The Music of Judee Sill is a tribute album to Judee Sill released in 2009.

== Track listing ==
1. Ron Sexsmith - "Crayon Angel"
2. Beth Orton - "Reach for the Sky"
3. Daniel Rossen - "Waterfall"
4. Frida Hyvönen - "Jesus Was a Cross Maker"
5. Shalants - "Lopin Along Thru the Cosmos"
6. Final Fantasy - "The Donor"
7. Nicolai Dunger -"Soldier of the Heart"
8. Trembling Blue Stars - "Lady-O"
9. Colossal Yes - "The Phoenix"
10. Marissa Nadler & Black Hole Infinity - "The Kiss"
11. Princeton -"Down Where the Valleys Are Low"
12. The Bye Bye Blackbirds - "There's a Rugged Road"
13. Meg Baird - "When the Bridegroom Comes"
14. Bill Callahan - "For a Rainbow"
15. P.G. Six - "Til Dreams Come True"
