= Shoulders (band) =

US musical group

Shoulders was an alternative rock band in Austin, Texas.

Shoulders toured nationally and throughout Europe, and they were especially well known in France and other European countries. Their material, written almost entirely by lead singer Michael Slattery and guitarist Todd Kassens, has been called "drunken carnival music."

Shoulders' lineup included Slattery, who sang and played everything from a huge parade drum which he also used as a trampoline to the "harmonica, out-of-tune cornet, hideous trombone, bent tin whistle," and "free-hanging river pipe"; Kassens on the guitars; Alan Gene Williams on the drums; and Chris Black on bass, piano, and organ. They were frequently accompanied by the well-known Austin cellist John Hagen, who plays in Lyle Lovett's large band. Shoulders' first album, Trashman Shoes, rose to the top of the rock charts in France. Their second was The Fun Never Stops, which did well in Europe but never attained the success of "Trashman Shoes".

Shoulders frequently played at the "Hole in the Wall" at the top of the Drag on Guadalupe in Austin, and for several years they played regularly at Austin's famous acoustic club the Cactus Cafe.
