= Richard Buckner (musician) =

American singer-songwriter

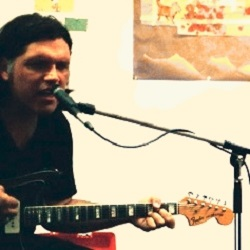
- Buckner in Austin, 2006

Background information
- Born: Richard Carl Buckner; California, U.S.
- Genre: Alt-country
- Labels: Rykodisc; Slow River; Merge
- Website: Official website

Richard Carl Buckner is an American singer-songwriter born in California, United States. After living in Edmonton, Alberta, for a number of years, he relocated to Brooklyn, New York.

== Background ==
Buckner's solo career began with Bloomed (1994), a lyrically dense suite of songs recorded in Lubbock, Texas, and produced by Lloyd Maines. It was released when Buckner was the frontman of the band The Doubters, which was not achieving very much success at the time. In January 1996, while living in San Francisco, he recorded an album's worth of acoustic songs, all of which reappeared in more fully realized forms on his second and third albums. The CD was self-produced and self-released, and was sold exclusively at his early shows.

Later that year, he signed with MCA Records, for whom he recorded two albums, both produced by J.D. Foster. Devotion + Doubt was released in 1997, displaying a more adventurous, almost avant-garde approach to songwriting and arranging, and featuring backing from members of the band Giant Sand, as well as Maines and Marc Ribot, among others. Its follow-up, 1998's Since, continues in this style, with an even greater emphasis on detailed production, this time featuring contributions from John McEntire, Dave Schramm, David Grubbs, Syd Straw, and others. Although these albums garnered considerable critical approval for Buckner, they did not perform well enough for his label, and he was released from his contract with MCA Records (whom he then nicknamed "Musical Career Assassins") shortly thereafter.

His 2000 album, The Hill, was released by Overcoat Recordings and features poems from Edgar Lee Masters's Spoon River Anthology, which Buckner set to music. Also in 2000, his self-released, self-titled album (recorded in 1996) was issued by Overcoat, his final release for the label. He returned in 2002, first with the EP Impasse-ette, then with a full-length entitled Impasse one month later. In 2004, an edited version of Buckner's song "Ariel Ramirez", from the album Since (1998), was featured in a television ad for the Volkswagen Touareg. The song, in its original form, was also featured in the 2008 horror film The Strangers.

He is currently aligned with the North Carolina–based indie label Merge Records, who released 2004's Dents and Shells and 2006's Meadow. Between the two, he released an album with Jon Langford called Sir Dark Invader vs. The Fanglord (2005, originally recorded in Sally Timms's house in 2002) on Buried Treasure Records. Merge Records released Buckner's album Our Blood on August 2, 2011. The album was licensed in Europe and Oceania to Decor records.

Buckner's album Surrounded was released in 2013 by Merge Records.

Buckner has been cited as an inspiration by Justin Vernon of Bon Iver. In an interview, Vernon stated that 22, A Million was dedicated to Buckner and Bernice Johnson Reagon.

In December 2020, Buckner released his first book, Cuttings from the Tangle, with Black Sparrow Press. NPR's Morning Edition said of the book: “During a career spent crisscrossing the country, Buckner has seen plenty. In all those hotels between here and there, at those bars and truck stops and lounges, he would sit and listen . . . Buckner puts that power of observation to good use.” Writing for Literary Hub, author Nina MacLaughlin said: “Cuttings from the Tangle is not the work of a road-weary musician dabbling in another form. This book confirms a truth hinted at all these years in the language of his lyrics: Buckner is a writer.”

== Discography ==
- Bloomed (1994, 1999)
- Devotion + Doubt (1997)
- Since (1998)
- The Hill (2000)
- Richard Buckner (2000)
- Impasse-ette (EP) (2002)
- Impasse (2002)
- Dents and Shells (2004)
- Sir Dark Invader vs. The Fanglord [with Jon Langford] (2005)
- Meadow (2006)
- Our Blood (2011)
- Surrounded (2013)

=== Other contributions ===
- Real: The Tom T. Hall Project. Track 3: “When Love Is Gone” (Sire Records, 1998)
- The Band of Blacky Ranchette – Still Lookin' Good to Me (Thrill Jockey, 2003)

== Books ==
- Cuttings from the Tangle. Black Sparrow Press. 2020. ISBN 978-1-57423-244-8.
