= Tom Freund =

American singer-songwriter

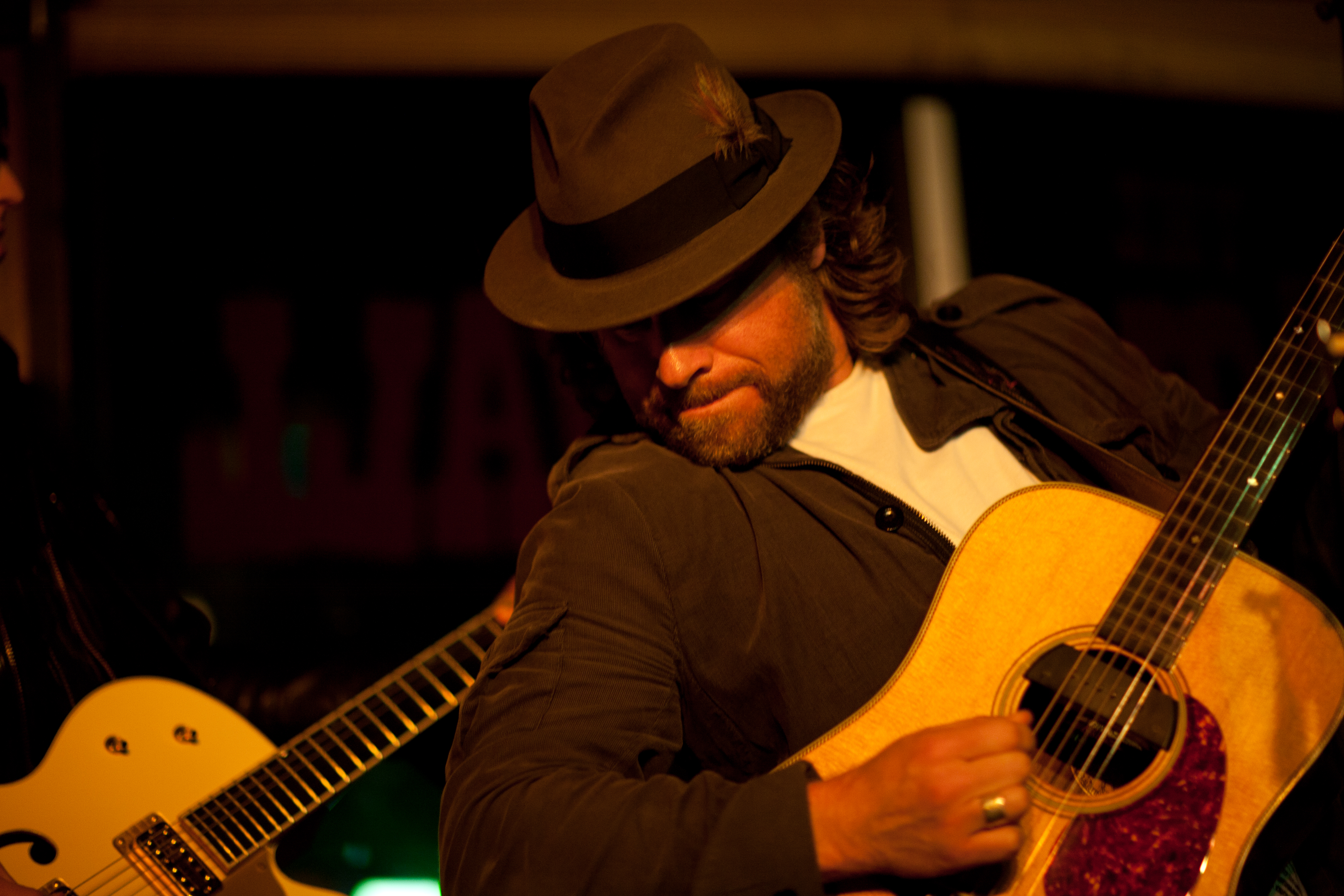
- Tom performing in 2010

Background information
- Born: Thomas Hagström Freund; August 28, 1968 (age 57); New York City; United States
- Genres: Folk rock, alternative rock, surf rock, jam rock, americana
- Occupation: Musician
- Instruments: Guitar, ukulele, piano, double bass, mandolin
- Years active: 1992–present
- Labels: Cardas, Red Ant, Surf Road Records
- Website: Official web site

Thomas Hagström Freund (born August 28, 1968) is an American singer-songwriter and multi-instrumentalist. Freund's music consists of elements of folk rock, americana and alternative rock. Freund met Ben Harper when he was attending Pitzer College in Claremont, California. In 1992 the duo released an album, Pleasure and Pain. Not long after, he joined the alternative country group The Silos as their bassist, and moved to Austin, Texas. He released his debut solo album, North American Long Weekend, in 1998 and has released albums on his own Surf Road Records since 2000. While releasing his own music, Tom has also contributed to albums by artists including Graham Parker, Mandy Moore, and Josh Kelley. Some of his work, including "Copper Moon", appeared on the TV program One Tree Hill, while other songs have appeared on Dawson's Creek and Parenthood.

== Early life ==
Tom attended Horace Mann School, Fiorello H. LaGuardia High School and Greenwich High School. During high school, Tom was a member of the jazz ensemble as an upright bass player. He was also a member of the prestigious Tri-State McDonald's High School Jazz Ensemble, which landed him an audition with Elizabeth Swados. Swados was impressed by his musical talents and cast Tom in her 1987 production of Swing as a part of the Next Wave festival at BAM. In the production, Tom played guitar, upright bass and sang both a solo number and as a member of the ensemble. After graduating high school, Freund immediately became involved in the Off Broadway theater scene while taking classes at Columbia University. During this time, Tom was also playing clubs in New York City and doing some TV music work. In 1991, Tom enrolled at Pitzer College. Through a mutual friend, Freund met Ben Harper. The two formed a duo and in 1992 released a record on Cardas Records entitled Pleasure and Pain.

== Career ==
The limited-release of Pleasure And Pain in 1992 helped launch both Freund and Harper's careers. Harper signed a record deal with Virgin Records while Freund spent several years playing bass with acclaimed roots-rock band The Silos. In 1998, Freund released his solo debut, North American Long Weekend, on the Mercury subsidiary Red Ant Records. The record received an avalanche of critical accolades, most notably in The New York Times in which Ann Powers called it an "unexpected gem" and ranked it #3 in her year-end best-of poll.

Following the release of North American Long Weekend, Freund alternated between recording and touring behind his own discs, playing upright bass, electric bass guitar, and mandolin with the likes of British pub-rock great Graham Parker and rising groove-soul sensation Brett Dennen. During this time, Freund became a favorite of NPR's Weekend Edition and performed live on Morning Becomes Eclectic in 2000.

In 2007, Freund released Hug Trees, a children's record, "born out of a father finding himself composing songs for and with his daughter." The album consists of 11 tracks and featured collaborations with Abra Moore, Brett Dennen and Victoria Williams. The record also contains an eco-friendly motif and encourages kids to go outside and enjoy nature. Freund found influence for the funky "Freezedance" in the work of James Brown. In regards to the album, Freund said, "I've been writing and making music for a long time. Becoming a father just added a beautiful new layer to the whole experience for me. On Hug Trees, my daughter Delilah is my co-producer, my audience, my muse. We created these songs together over the last couple of years. It was very natural to just go ahead and make a record."

A summer tour with Ben Harper helped rekindle the old friends' collaborative spirits, which led to Harper getting involved as producer of Collapsible Plans, Freund's fifth full-length album. The album, released in 2008, also featured piano and vocal contributions from Jackson Browne on two tracks. In regards to the record, Freund has commented, "I wanted to make a record for a long time that really felt like 'a time and a place,' the way records used to be made." The song "Collapsible Plans (Sugar)" was performed live on Last Call With Carson Daly in January 2009.

In 2011, Tom released The Edge of Venice via Surf Road Records. The album was produced by John Alagia (who had previously worked with the likes of John Mayer, Jason Mraz, and Dave Matthews Band) and featured nine new songs. The Edge of Venice was released in the wake of Freund's Fit To Screen EP, whose songs were featured on NBC's Parenthood. In 2012, Freund appeared in Judd Apatow's film, This Is 40.

Two Moons, Tom's seventh studio record, was released in June 2014. In producing and co-engineering the album, Freund drew upon folk, rock, jazz and other roots sources for an urbane Americana sound. The 11 track album includes collaborations with Ben Harper and Serena Ryder.The record was successfully funded through a PledgeMusic campaign. Although admitting to having some trepidations about going the crowd-sourcing route, Freund wound up a believer. "I'm very endeared by the Pledge experience," he confesses. "It showed me that people wanted to engage in it. That was moving for me and got me excited."

To promote his album "Two Moons" Tom Freund toured in October and November 2014 in Europe as solo headliner (Switzerland, Germany, Denmark, Czech Republic and The Netherlands) and then subsequently opened for Brett Dennen in London, Amsterdam, Barcelona, and Madrid

In 2015 Tom Freund opened three dates in the UK (London, Manchester, Birmingham) for Ben Harper.

== Discography ==
=== Studio albums ===
- Pleasure and Pain (as Ben Harper and Tom Freund) (1992, Cardas)
- North American Long Weekend (1998, Red Ant)
- Sympatico (1999, Freund)
- Copper Moon (2004, Surf Road)
- Hug Trees (as Tom Freund and His Friends) (2007, Tom Freund)
- Collapsible Plans (2008, Surf Road)
- The Edge of Venice (2011, Surf Road)
- Two Moons (2014, Surf Road)
- East of Lincoln (2018, Surf Road)
- The Year I Spent In Space (2022, Surf Road)

=== EPs ===
- L.A. Fundamentalist Music (2000, Surf Road)
- Sweet Affection (2005, Surf Road)
- Xmas in Texas (2008, Surf Road)
- Fit To Screen (2009, Surf Road)

=== Live albums ===
- Stronghold Tapes: Live In Venica, CA (2013, Surf Road)

=== Compilation appearances ===
- A Fair Forgery of Pink Floyd (2003, Stanley) (song: "Fearless")
- I. C. Independent Celebration, Vol. 1 (2015, Birdstone Records) (songs: "Collapsible Plans (Sugar)" and "Summer Of '92")
