= Impasse (album) =

Studio album by Richard Buckner
- Released: 2002
- Studio: Beta Sound Recorders, Edmonton AB and “A Secret Location”
- Length: 33:39
- Label: Overcoat Recordings, Merge
- Producer: Richard Buckner

Richard Buckner chronology
The Hill (2000)	Impasse (2002)	Dents and Shells (2004)

Impasse is the fifth studio album by Richard Buckner. It was released by Overcoat Recordings in 2002, and re-released by Merge Records in 2017.

== Recording ==
Gregory McIntosh of AllMusic wrote, "When Impasse was released in late 2002, it was widely noted in the press that Buckner and his second wife, Penny Jo Buckner, were the only two musicians on the album and that, between the recording and the release of Impasse, the pair had split."

== Reception ==
In a review in the Austin Chronicle, Jim Caligiuri wrote, "Like Buckner's past work, Impasse is a challenge that reveals itself only after much careful listening; he's got his own meter and way with melody. Once you catch his drift, however, discovering music that's irresistible comes next."

Zac Johnson wrote in AllMusic, "Mellotron hums and vibraphone chimes back the singer's familiar growl and warm, nylon-stringed guitar, with textures floating past like faded slides bought from a garage sale." Johnson also believes "every song on the album is fantastic—starkly beautiful and unusually comforting" and, while not Buckner's best work, the album "is head and shoulders above 99 percent of the angst-fueled singer\songwriters out there."

Brandan Reid of Pitchfork wrote, "where we once were given a story, start to finish, Buckner now pours out a succession of vague images and emotions, and whenever he decides to cut off his stream of consciousness, it sounds like it's a little too soon."

In a retrospective review, Brian Howe of Pitchfork wrote, "Each song is titled by its own first line, making the tracklist an impromptu poem that demonstrates how Buckner's lyrics are at once self-sufficient and infinitely interchangeable: Seldom has he written a line that doesn't address itself to a fundamental sense of lapsed grace."

== Track listing ==
All songs written by Richard Buckner.

1. "Grace-I'd-Said-I'd-Known"
2. "Born Into Giving It Up"
3. "Hoping Wishers Never lose"
4. "Loaded at the Wrong Door"
5. "A Year Ahead... & a Light"
6. "Put on What You Wanna"
7. "A Shift"
8. "... & the Clouds've Lied"
9. "Stumble Down"
10. "Count Me In on This One"
11. "Dusty from the Talk"
12. "Were You Tried and Not as Tough"
13. "Impasse"
14. "I Know What I Knew"
15. "Stutterstep"

== Personnel ==
- Penny Jo Buckner – drums
- Richard Buckner – other instruments
