= Our Blood =

Studio album by Richard Buckner
- Released: August 2, 2011
- Genre: Alt-country
- Length: 37:02
- Label: Merge

Richard Buckner chronology
Meadow (2006)	Our Blood (2011)	Surrounded (2013)

Professional ratings
Aggregate scores
Source	Rating
Metacritic	79/100
Review scores
Source	Rating
Allmusic	4/5 stars
Pitchfork	8/10

Our Blood is a studio album by avant-garde American musician Richard Buckner. It was released in August 2011 by Merge Records.

== Track listing ==
No.	Title	Length
1.	"Traitor"	5:16
2.	"Escape"	3:32
3.	"Thief"	4:04
5.	"Ponder"	3:00
6.	"Witness"	4:47
7.	"Confession"	3:21
8.	"Hindsight"	4:30
9.	"Gang"	3:18
