= Wild Seeds =

American roots rock band

- Origin: Austin, Texas
- Genres: Roots rock, pop rock, alt-country
- Years active: 1984–1989
- Labels: Aznut, Jungle, Passport
- Past members: Michael Hall, Russell Sanchez, Phil Reed, French Acers, Julia Austin, Bo Solomon, Joey Shuffield, Paul Swift, Steve McCracken, Randy Franklin, Kris McKay

Wild Seeds are a roots-rock band from Austin, Texas formed in 1984. Michael Hall, the band's lead vocalist and guitarist, was inspired to found the band by successful post-punk bands of the time, including the Fleshtones and Dream Syndicate. The band broke up in 1989, but occasionally play together. They have been identified as one of multiple New Sincerity bands active during the 1980s, along with the Dharma Bums, True Believers, and Zeitgeist.

== Critical reception ==
David Menconi wrote in No Depression that the Wild Seeds were "one of the coolest bands to call Austin home during the mid-'80s." He also described their 2001 compilation album, I'm Sorry, I Can't Rock You All Night Long: 1984-1989, as "about the most fun you can have this side of an enchilada dinner with a case of Big Red". Robert Christgau wrote that on their first release, the 1984 EP Life is Grand, the Wild Seeds "show off a drummer supple enough to power their rock and roll eclecticism and a taste for serious fun wide-ranging and complicated enough to give them identity problems, which could clear up with one strong live show (like at the Pep Friday)." Christgau later awarded a B grade to the band's 1988 album Mud, Lies & Shame, writing that "the first three cuts are everything one could have hoped, especially the self-explanatory "I'm Sorry, I Can't Rock You All Night Long," a true classic as these things are measured." A review of the band's 1986 album Brave, Clean + Reverent in Billboard described it as a "crisp album of straight-ahead roof-raisers." Tom Popson wrote that on Brave, Clean + Reverent, "Hall exhibits a knack for creating interesting, concrete images that listeners can see clearly in the mind`s eye, while leaving enough ambiguity between those images to render contexts and relationships open to individual interpretation."

== Discography ==
- Life Is Grand (Life in Soul City) (Aznut EP, 1984)
- Brave, Clean + Reverent (Jungle, 1986)
- Mud, Lies & Shame (Passport, 1988)
- I'm Sorry, I Can't Rock You All Night Long: 1984-1989 (Aznut compilation, 2001)
