= The Silos =

American rock band

Silos
- Origin: New York City, U.S.
- Genres: Rock; alternative rock; roots rock
- Years active: 1985–present
- Labels: Record Collect; RCA; Normal; Watermelon; Checkered Past; Dualtone; Blue Rose; Bloodshot; Sonic Pyramid
- Members: Walter Salas-Humara; Konrad Meissner; Rod Hohl; Caitlin Oliver-Gans; Bruce Martin
- Past members: Bob Rupe (deceased); Mary Rowell; John Galway (deceased); John Ross; Brian Doherty; Graham Maby; Kenny Margolis; J.D. Foster; Darren Hess; Tom Freund; Scott Garber; Manny Verzosa; R. Walt Vincent; Gary Sunshine; Jonathan Tessler; Josema X Angel Cubero; Drew Glackin (deceased); Jeff Muendel
- Website: http://www.thesilos.net

The Silos is an American rock band formed by Walter Salas-Humara and Bob Rupe in New York City, United States, in 1985.

== History ==
Prior to starting the Silos, Salas-Humara had been a member of the Vulgar Boatmen, and Bob Rupe was in Florida bands the Roll N Pinz, the Cichlids, Crank and the Bobs, as well as Screaming Sneakers. The Silos put out the independently released album About Her Steps in 1986, which received a warm critical reception. The band's 1987 follow-up album, Cuba, also independently released, received even more recognition. The Silos were named Best New Artist in the Rolling Stone magazine critics' poll. Cuba continues to be cited as highly influential among alternative country artists. The band subsequently signed to RCA Records and released the album The Silos (1990), produced by Salas-Humara and Rupe along with Peter Moore. Commonly referred to as "the bird album" or "The One With The Bird On The Cover", The Silos led to the band's network TV debut appearance on Late Night with David Letterman.

Salas-Humara quit the band following the release of The Silos and purchased the rights to the Silos name from Rupe in 1991, thus dissolving the partnership. Subsequent albums included Hasta La Victoria (1992), Susan Across the Ocean (1994), Heater and its remix companion Cooler (both 1998). After Heater was recorded, Salas-Humara turned the band into a three piece with Drew Glackin on bass and lap steel guitar and Konrad Meissner on drum and backing vocals. The subsequent records were Laser Beam Next Door (2001), When The Telephone Rings (2004), and the live This Highway Is A Circle. Bloodshot Records released the Silos' 2007 offering, Come On Like The Fast Lane. In 2008, Glackin died. Salas-Humara and Meissner continue to perform with other players. In 2011, the band released Florizona with Rod Hohl playing bass, Bruce Martin on keyboards and Jason Victor on guitar.

Salas-Humara has also released the solo albums Lagartija (1988) (which also featured Bob Rupe), Radar (1995) and most recently, Curve and Shake (2014). He joined Alejandro Escovedo and Michael Hall in a side project called the Setters. The novelist and music aficionado Jonathan Lethem called Salas-Humara "a melodic genius, one of our greatest songwriters." Rolling Stone said Salas-Humara "has a deft songwriting touch, creating terse, stripped-down songs as elegant as Shaker furniture."

Bob Rupe went on to record with House of Freaks, Gutterball, Danny & Dusty and Sparklehorse. Prior to starting Silos he was well established as a producer and engineer in South Florida, handling production for Psycho Daisies, The Chant and The Preachers. He was a member of Cracker from 1994 to 2000 and has appeared as a guest artist on releases by many other artists including Freedy Johnston, Joan Osborne, Steve Wynn, Daniel Johnston and Garrison Starr. Bob Rupe has also mastered records for a variety of artists across many musical styles including Charlie Pickett (Bar Band Americanus). Rupe died on March 3, 2025, at the age of 68.

== Discography ==
- 1985 About Her Steps (Record Collect)
- 1987 Cuba (Record Collect)
- 1990 The Silos (a.k.a. The One with the Bird on the Cover) (RCA) U.S. #140
- 1992 Hasta la Victoria! (Normal Records)
- 1994 Susan Across the Ocean (Watermelon Records)
- 1994 Diablo (European version of Susan Across the Ocean) (Normal Records)
- 1994 Ask the Dust: Recordings 1980-1988 (reissue of About Her Steps and Lagartija [Walter Salas-Humara]) (Watermelon Records)
- 1997 Long Green Boat (Greatest hits with live tracks) (Last Call Records)
- 1998 Heater (Checkered Past Records)
- 1998 Cooler (Remixes of Heater) (Normal Records)
- 2001 Barcelona (Live) (Return to Sender Records/Normal Mail Order)
- 2001 Laser Beam Next Door (Checkered Past Records)
- 2001 Nuestra Vida (Greatest hits) (Discmedi)
- 2004 When the Telephone Rings (Dualtone Records)
- 2006 This Highway Is a Circle (Live CD + DVD) (Blue Rose Records)
- 2007 Come On Like the Fast Lane (Bloodshot Records)
- 2011 Florizona (Sonic Pyramid)
- 2022 Family

== Related projects ==
- 1988 Walter Salas-Humara, Lagartija (Record Collect)
- 1990 The Vulgar Boatmen, You and Your Sister (Record Collect)
- 1992 The Vulgar Boatmen, Please Panic (Safe House Records)
- 1993 The Setters, The Setters (with Alejandro Escovedo and Michael Hall) (Blue Million Miles Records; re-released in 1994 on Watermelon Records)
- 1994 Walter Salas-Humara, Lean (Live) (Return to Sender Records/Normal Mail Order)
- 1994 Walter Salas-Humara, Ask the Dust: Recordings 1980-1988 (reissue of About Her Steps and Lagartija [solo]) (Watermelon Records)
- 1995 The Vulgar Boatmen, Opposite Sex (Blanco y Negro)
- 1996 The Setters, Dark Ballad Trash (Return to Sender Records/Normal Mail Order)
- 1996 Walter Salas-Humara, Radar (Watermelon Records)
- 2000 Woozy, Woozy (with Dave Bassett) (Last Call Records)
- 2003 The Vulgar Boatmen, Wide Awake (Selections from the studio albums plus four new tracks) (No Nostalgia)
- 2008 I'm Not Jim (with novelist Jonathan Lethem), You Are All My People (Bloodshot Records)
- 2014 Walter Salas-Humara, Curve and Shake (Sonic Pyramid)
