= Mary Rowell =

American violinist

Mary Rowell is an American violinist based in New York City. In 1998 Rowell co-founded the string quartet ETHEL. She retired from the group in 2011 but continues to be very active in the downtown New York music community, where she is known as an electric violin soloist. She is a frequent participant in the Tribeca New Music Festival.

Prior to ETHEL, Rowell was a member of the indie band The Silos and the Grammy Award-winning Tango Project. Rowell's best known solo work is her performance of Maxwell’s Demon by Richard Einhorn .

She is a graduate of the Juilliard School.
