= You Don't Love Me Yet =

2007 novel by Jonathan Lethem

- Author: Jonathan Lethem
- Language: English
- Published: 2007 (Doubleday)
- Publication place: United States
- Media type: Print (hardback)
- Pages: 240 pp
- ISBN: 978-0-385-51218-3

You Don't Love Me Yet (2007) is a comic novel about alternative music from Jonathan Lethem, set in modern Los Angeles.

== Title ==
The novel takes its title from two unconnected songs of the same title by Roky Erickson and The Vulgar Boatmen. The original title was Monster Eyes, but Lethem was convinced to change it by his publisher. He later admitted to an interviewer that the association with the two songs "made it feel very lucky to me to put it on the book," and that even though the new title "isn't my phrase, for a book about appropriated language and the way things can be repurposed, it seemed okay. And, it's a beautifully passive-aggressive title."

== Plot summary ==
Lucinda Hoekke is an underemployed woman in her late twenties, playing bass in a fledgling Los Angeles rock group. There are three other members: Matthew, the group's lead singer and Lucinda's ex-boyfriend, who kidnaps a kangaroo from the local zoo to save it from boredom; Denise, the clear-headed drummer, works at "No Shame," a sex shop; and Bedwin, the group's composer and lead guitarist, who is very fragile and suffers from writer's block. Bedwin watches the same Fritz Lang movie repeatedly.

Lucinda takes a job at a performance art project called "Complaint Line", listening to anonymous callers talk about their grievances. She falls for a regular caller, initially known only as the "Complainer," who amuses her with his acerbic reflections about life and self-deprecating humor. She begins using his musings as song lyrics, inspiring her band to new heights of creativity. She becomes obsessed with the complainer, whose name is Carl, and begins an unstable all-consuming love affair with him.

The band's unexpectedly successful performance at a loft party leads to an invitation to appear live on Los Angeles' leading alternative music radio program. However, Carl, who uses his lyrics to force his way into the band, disrupts their radio broadcast, leading to romantic and musical consequences.

== Reception and analysis ==
You Don't Love Me Yet received mixed reviews. In a promotional appearance at Google, Lethem attributed this reaction to the novel's intentionally silly and light tone. He said that the novel was supposed to follow the form of a romantic comedy and was his most "funny" and "sexy" book. He argued that the novel's central theme was the mystery of artistic influence, borrowing and collaboration, the individual artist's murky relationship to the world around him. He thought that this theme could best be explored in the context of a rock band, since band members are often much greater artists collectively than they are as individuals in a way that is difficult to explain clearly. He also noted that musicians often borrow banal pieces of popular culture and give them new and exciting meanings.

The novel was noted for incorporating the real-life Happy Foot/Sad Foot sign in Silver Lake, Los Angeles into its plot. This was a rotating sign for a foot clinic that showed a foot with a happy face on one side and a sad face on the other. Like Lucinda in the book, some locals would use the sign as an omen of good or bad luck based on which side they saw first, until the sign was taken down in 2019.
