= Watermelon Records =

- Parent company: Texas Music Group/New West Records
- Founded: 1989
- Founder: John Kunz, Heinz Gessler, Robert Earl Keen
- Defunct: 1998
- Status: Defunct
- Distributor: Alternative Distribution Alliance
- Genre: Rock; Americana; Alternative country
- Country of origin: U.S.
- Location: Austin, Texas

Watermelon Records was a record label based in Austin, Texas.

== History ==
Watermelon Records was founded in 1989 by John Kunz, Heinz Gessler, and Robert Earl Keen. Keen later sold his interest in the label.

During the 1990s, Watermelon released 10-15 albums a year, mostly Americana music.

Watermelon Records filed for bankruptcy in 1998, and its assets were sold to Texas Clef Entertainment Group, an affiliate of Antone's Records.

In 2010, New West acquired the Texas Music Group, which included the Watermelon Records label.

== Roster ==
- Asylum Street Spankers
- Austin Lounge Lizards
- Vince Bell
- Brave Combo
- Johnny Bush
- The Damnations
- Julian Dawson
- The Derailers
- Alejandro Escovedo
- Rosie Flores with Ray Campi
- The Good Sons
- The Gourds
- Hamilton Pool
- Hayseed
- High Noon
- Tish Hinojosa
- Duane Jarvis
- Santiago Jimenez, Jr.
- Hal Ketchum
- Charlie Louvin
- Iain Matthews
- Steve McNaughton
- Lisa Mednick
- Hugh Moffatt
- Katy Moffatt
- Bob Neuwirth
- Carla Olson
- Omar & the Howlers
- Maryann Price
- Doug Sahm
- Walter Salas-Humara
- The Setters
- The Silos
- Darden Smith
- Hemlock Smith
- Eric Taylor
- Timbuk 3
- Justin Trevino
- Roger Wallace
- Don Walser
- Monte Warden
- Webb Wilder and the Nashvegans
- Steve Young

== See also ==
- List of record labels
