= Devotion + Doubt =

Studio album by Richard Buckner
- Released: March 11, 1997
- Genre: Folk rock
- Length: 39:13
- Label: MCA
- Producer: JD Foster

Richard Buckner chronology
Bloomed (1994)	Devotion + Doubt (1997)	Since (1998)

Devotion + Doubt (sometimes formatted as Devotion+Doubt) is the second studio album by Richard Buckner, and his first album released on a major label. It was released on March 11, 1997 by MCA Records. Buckner recorded the album shortly after the end of his first marriage.

== Critical reception ==
Professional ratings
Review scores
Source	Rating
AllMusic	4.5/5 stars
The Austin Chronicle	3.5/5 stars
Chicago Tribune	2/4 stars
Encyclopedia of Popular Music	4/5 stars
Rolling Stone	3.5/5 stars
Spin	9/10
The Village Voice	B−

Mark Deming of AllMusic wrote that it was "a significantly more ambitious and accomplished effort than [Buckner's 1994 debut album] Bloomed" and "a creative left turn that more than lived up to the promise of [Bloomed]". Trouser Press' Erik Hage wrote that Devotion + Doubt was "...a gut-wrenching song cycle that deserves a place in the divorce-album hall-of-fame alongside Dylan's Blood on the Tracks". Peter Blackstock of No Depression wrote that "It's the voice that brings Buckner's music to flesh; he is, above all else, a singer. It's a smooth, melodious croon, by nature, but imbued with such a warm, bittersweet darkness that the sound seems to ooze from the speakers in richly layered browntones with every careful cadence." A review in SF Weekly praised the album's songs, saying that once you can read its lyric sheet, the previously fragmented lyrics cohere. The review said that once this becomes clear, the songs "...complete Devotion & Doubt's promise."

Dan Kening of the Chicago Tribune was less favorable in his review of the album, writing, "Buckner saddles even his better songs, like "Lil' Wallet Picture" and "A Goodbye Rye," with such pretentious lyrics ("Once upon a blue thing or two/Eyes and sighs and a moon confused") that they sink under their own self-conscious weight." Robert Christgau similarly mocked Buckner's lyrics, writing in The Village Voice, "he has just the sensitive baritone to make awful seem awful romantic to sad sacks and the women who love them."

== Track listing ==
All tracks are written by Richard Buckner.

No.	Title	Length
1.	"Pull"	2:40
2.	"Lil Wallet Picture"	4:33
3.	"Ed's Song"	2:22
4.	"Home"	3:09
5.	"A Goodbye Rye"	4:15
6.	"Fater"	1:55
7.	"Kate Rose"	0:36
8.	"4AM"	3:18
9.	"Roll"	3:23
10.	"Polly Waltz"	1:25
11.	"Figure"	2:47
12.	"On Traveling"	4:29
13.	"Song of 27"	4:21

== Personnel ==
- Richard Buckner – primary artist, vocals, arrangements
- Greg Calbi – mastering
- J. D. Foster – production
- Michael Hall – arrangements
- Craig Schumacher – engineering

=== Guest artists ===
- Joey Burns
- John Convertino
- Howe Gelb
- Champ Hood
- Marc Ribot
