= Walter Salas-Humara =

American songwriter

Walter Salas-Humara is the chief songwriter for and a founding member of The Silos, a rock band formed in 1985 in New York City with Bob Rupe. The Silos were voted the Best New American Band in the Rolling Stone Critics Poll of 1987, and have released more than a dozen albums to date. As indicated by its name, which suggests both agrarian populism and impending apocalypse, the band shows influences of post-punk East Village experimentalism as well as the nascent country-rock revivalism that would return at decade's end. As described by Stephen Holden in the New York Times, "The band's austere style inflects the astringent twang of the Velvet Underground with the drone of R.E.M. and adds countryish echoes that recall Gram Parsons."

Salas-Humara has also recorded four solo records, numerous live albums and several one-offs with other songwriters, and has produced albums for other artists. He is of Cuban-American extraction and known for his occasional use of Spanish-language lyrics. He also works as a painter and visual artist.

== Early life ==
Conceived in Havana, Cuba and born in New York City, Walter Salas-Humara grew up in South Florida with his two older brothers after his family relocated to Ft. Lauderdale when he was three. He began playing drums at age seven, performing with a series of prog-rock and disco bands throughout adolescence. A cross-country road trip before his senior year of high school, led directly to his taking up the guitar and beginning to write songs. He attended the University of Florida in Gainesville, where he studied visual arts and received a Bachelor of Fine Arts degree. While in college, he co-founded the original version of the Vulgar Boatmen.

In 1982, he moved to New York to pursue a career as a visual artist, where he completed a year of graduate study in fine arts at the Pratt Institute in Brooklyn.

== The Silos ==
=== New York, 1985 to 1990 ===
Salas-Humara formed the Silos in 1985 in New York City with Bob Rupe, a veteran of the South Florida music scene. The band also featured Mary Rowell, a classically trained violinist from Juilliard, and a floating rhythm section. The band released its initial album About Her Steps on its own Record Collect label that same year. Their second album, Cuba, was released two years later in 1987, for which they were voted Best New American Band in the Rolling Stone Critics Poll. The band's extensive use of violin and bright acoustic textures made Cuba an acknowledged influence on the burgeoning alt-country/No Depression scene several years later.

In 1990, the band released their major-label debut on RCA, simply called The Silos (more commonly known as The One with the Bird on the Cover), which also featured Amy Allison on vocals and J.D. Foster on bass. In conjunction with the album's release, the band appeared on Late Night with David Letterman. When they were dropped by RCA, Salas-Humara retained the Silos name. Rupe recorded with the bands House of Freaks, Gutterball and Sparklehorse, and was a member of Cracker from 1994 to 2000.

=== Los Angeles, 1990 to 2000 ===
Relocating to Los Angeles in 1991, Salas-Humara reformed the Silos with bassist Tom Freund, singer-guitarist Manny Verzosa, drummer Darren Hess and sometimes guitarist Jon Dee Graham, all of whom hailed from Austin, Texas or later spent time there. This core band (augmented by various studio musicians) played on the albums Hasta la Victoria! (1992) and Susan Across the Ocean (1994), released in the U.S. on Austin label Watermelon Records. A third album, Heater (1998), was released on the Checkered Past label and featured guitarist Gary Sunshine after Verzosa died in an automobile accident while on tour. A series of electronica and trip-hop remixes of Heater was released on the German label Normal the same year under the name Cooler.

=== New York, 2000 to the present ===
Opting for a more aggressive, stripped-down sound and a more experimental approach to the songwriting, Salas-Humara returned to New York and refashioned the Silos as a power trio with Drew Glackin on bass and lap steel guitar and Konrad Meissner on drums. This configuration appeared on Laser Beam Next Door (2001, Checkered Past), When the Telephone Rings (2004, Dualtone), Come on Like the Fast Lane (2007, Bloodshot) and the live This Highway Is a Circle that same year (Blue Rose). After Glackin's unexpected death in 2008, Salas-Humara and Meissner added Jason Victor on guitar, Rod Hohl on bass, and Bruce Martin on keyboard, and recorded the 2011 Silos record Florizona (Sonic Pyramid). Although Salas Humara moved to Flagstaff, Arizona in 2008, at least several other band members remained in the New York area circa 2020.

Salas-Humara and the Silos appear in the George Pelecanos novel Shame the Devil (2000), the last of the D.C. Quartet (The Big Blowdown, King Suckerman, The Sweet Forever), when series regular Nick Stefanos sees them play at the D.C. club the Black Cat: "The Silos, the night's headliner, came out a half hour later. Walter Salas-Humara took center stage and ripped through a set from Heater, his group's latest album, as Stefanos downed two more beers."

== Solo and side projects ==
In addition to his work with the Silos, Salas-Humara has recorded four solo records: Lagartija (1988), Radar (1995) (returning to his first instrument, the drums, on both), after an 18-year hiatus, Curve and Shake (2014), and Explodes and Disappears (2016).

After establishing a beachhead in the Austin music scene, he recorded two records with fellow songwriters Michael Hall of the Wild Seeds and Alejandro Escovedo, late of Rank and File and the True Believers, under the name the Setters: The Setters (1993) and a live album recorded in Berlin, Dark Ballad Trash (1996). The would-be supergroup was conjured out of thin air when Hall was informed by Transatlantic phone call that he wouldn't be invited back to the Berlin Independence Days Festival, which only booked first-time bands. The Setters was his impromptu (and successful) attempt to skirt this momentary impediment.

Salas-Humara partnered with songwriter Dave Bassett (Shinedown, Josh Groban) on the one-off Woozy and their eponymous 2000 release Woozy for the French label Last Call.

In 2008, he recorded the album You Are All My People with novelist Jonathan Lethem under the band name I'm Not Jim, produced by the Elegant Two (Beastie Boys, Yoko Ono) and released on Bloodshot Records. Lethem called Salas-Humara "a melodic genius, one of our greatest songwriters."

In addition to his own projects, Salas-Humara worked as a soundtrack composer for the Sony Classics film Whatever (1998) and the TBS NASCAR documentary Good to Go. His songs have appeared in the films Girl (1998) and Takedown (2000), and he has created original compositions for episodes of Sex and the City and Queer Eye for the Straight Guy. He produced two albums for the Vulgar Boatmen – You and Your Sister (1990, Record Collect) and Wide Awake (2003, No Nostalgia); fellow Setter Michael Hall's first solo album, Quarter to Three (1990, Record Collect); Milwaukee folk-pop duo the Woolridge Brothers' Uncovering the Sun (1998, Don't Records); Ann Arbor singer-songwriter Jim Roll's Lunette (2000, New West); and Minneapolis singer-songwriter Jonathan Rundman's Public Library (2005, Salt Lady), which featured the circa-2000 version of the Silos as its backup band.

== Visual artist ==
Having first moved to New York in 1982 to pursue a career in the visual arts, and having completed a year of graduate work at the Pratt Institute in Brooklyn, Salas-Humara found steady work with the Leo Castelli Gallery during the 1980s Manhattan art boom. Citing as his heroes 1950s minimalist painter Ellsworth Kelly and Pop artist Jasper Johns, Salas-Humara's early paintings were primarily large abstract color fields. His art career was cut short with the success of the Silos three years later.

In the early 2000s, Salas-Humara took up painting again after a hiatus of two decades. On a whim, he created several stylized, cartoon-like dog paintings as holiday gifts for his nieces and nephews. They became so popular that he was soon spending much of his free time painting commissioned dog portraits in his signature style for friends and fans. In 2005, he formed a company called WaltersDogs and began producing originals and prints for sale at shows, by mail-order and in music-oriented art galleries like Yard Dog in Austin, eventually expanding his product line to include apparel, accessories, bedding and stationery products.

"I create paintings that combine qualities of the abstract art I like with fun imagery that anybody can relate to, even kids," he says.

His dog paintings can be seen on the walls of Elisabeth Moss's apartment in the 2010 Universal Pictures comedy Get Him to the Greek.

== Personal life ==
Salas-Humara has been married twice: To film editor Sandy Guthrie from 1986 to 1998 and to graphic designer Tanya Hotton from 2001 to 2008. As of 2022, he has lived in Flagstaff, Arizona since 2008, with Amy Daggett, who has also performed on several of Salas-Humara's albums.

== Discography ==
=== The Silos ===
- 1985: About Her Steps (Record Collect)
- 1987 Cuba (Record Collect)
- 1990: The Silos (RCA) (aka The One with the Bird on the Cover)
- 1992 Hasta la Victoria! (Normal)
- 1994 Susan Across the Ocean (Watermelon)
- 1994 Diablo (European version. of Susan Across the Ocean) (Normal)
- 1994 Ask the Dust: Recordings 1980-1988 (reissue of About Her Steps and Lagartija [Walter Salas-Humara]) (Watermelon)
- 1997 Long Green Boat (Greatest hits with live tracks) (Last Call)
- 1998 Heater (Checkered Past)
- 1998 Cooler (Re-mixes of Heater) (Normal)
- 2001 Barcelona (Live) [Return To Sender (Normal Mail Order)]
- 2001 Laser Beam Next Door (Checkered Past)
- 2001 Nuestra Vida (Greatest hits) (Discmedi)
- 2004 When the Telephone Rings (Dualtone)
- 2006 Come on Like the Fast Lane (Bloodshot)
- 2007 This Highway Is a Circle (Live CD + DVD) (Blue Rose)
- 2011 Florizona (Sonic Pyramid)

=== Related projects ===
- 1988 Walter Salas-Humara, Lagartija (Record Collect)
- 1990 The Vulgar Boatmen, You and Your Sister (Record Collect)
- 1992 The Vulgar Boatmen, Please Panic (Safe House Records)
- 1993 The Setters, The Setters (with Alejandro Escovedo and Michael Hall) (Blue Million Miles)
- 1994 Walter Salas-Humara, Lean (Live) (Return To Sender/Normal Mail Order)
- 1994 Walter Salas-Humara/'The Silos, Ask the Dust: Recordings 1980-1988 (reissue of About Her Steps and Lagartija [solo]) (Watermelon)
- 1995 The Vulgar Boatmen, Opposite Sex (Blanco y Negro)
- 1996 The Setters, Dark Ballad Trash (with Alejandro Escovedo and Michael Hall) (Return To Sender/Normal Mail Order)
- 1996 Walter Salas-Humara, Radar (Watermelon)
- 2000 Woozy, Woozy (with Dave Bassett) (Last Call)
- 2008 I'm Not Jim (with Jonathan Lethem), You Are All My People (Bloodshot)
- 2010 Live at the Hideout: Jon Langford and Walter Salas-Humara (Bloodshot) – digital only
- 2014 Walter Salas-Humara, Curve and Shake (Sonic Pyramid)
- 2016 Walter Salas-Humara, Explodes and Disappears (Sonic Pyramid)

=== Producer ===
- 1990 Michael Hall, Quarter to Three (Record Collect)
- 1990 The Vulgar Boatmen, You and Your Sister (Record Collect)
- 1998 The Woolridge Brothers, Uncovering the Sun (Don't)
- 2000 Jim Roll, Lunette (New West)
- 2003 The Vulgar Boatmen, Wide Awake (No Nostalgia)
- 2005 Jonathan Rundman, Public Library (Salt Lady)
