= Fonzi =

Fonzi may refer to:

Surname

- Dolores Fonzi (born 1978), Argentine actress
- Gaeton Fonzi (1935–2012), American journalist
- Giuseppe Fonzi (born 1991), Italian professional cyclist
- Giuseppangelo Fonzi (1768–1840), Italian dentist
- Tomás Fonzi (born 1981), Argentine actor

First or nickname

- Alan Alda (born 1936; nicknamed "Fonzi"), American actor
- Fonzi Thornton, American singer

== See also ==
- Fonzie, "The Fonz", a Happy Days character
- Fonsi (disambiguation)
- Fonzy
- Fozzie
- Fozzy (disambiguation)
