= Fonsi =

Fonsi may refer to:

- Luis Fonsi (born 1978), Puerto Rican singer
- Fonsi Nieto (born 1978), Spanish motorcycle racer
- Fonsi (footballer) (born 1986), Spanish footballer
- FONSI (finding of no significant impact)

== See also ==
- Fonzie
- Fonzi (disambiguation)
- Fonzy
- Fozzie
- Fozzy (disambiguation)
