= Backfire =

Back-fire is an unintended explosion produced in a vehicle's engine.

Backfire may also refer to:

== Film and television ==
- Backfire (1926 film), part of the Ton of Fun series
- Backfire (1950 film), featuring Virginia Mayo and Gordon Macrae
- Backfire! (1962 film), an entry in the Edgar Wallace Mysteries film series
- Backfire (1964 film), starring Jean-Paul Belmondo and Jean Seberg
- Backfire (1988 film), a movie starring Karen Allen
- Backfire! (1995 film), a 1995 spoof movie starring Josh Mosby, Telly Savalas (final role) and Robert Mitchum
- Backfire, a 2019 American crime drama film directed and written by Dave Patten
- "Backfire" (CSI: Miami), an episode of the TV show CSI:Miami
- Backfire, a recurring segment on The Daily Show, 1996-1998
- "Backfire" (Dexter's Laboratory), an episode of Dexter's Laboratory
- Backfire (Friday Night Lights), an episode of the TV series Friday Night Lights

== Other uses ==
- Backfire, NATO reporting name for the Soviet and Russian Tupolev Tu-22M long-range bomber
- Operation Backfire (World War II), the launch of three A4 rockets in October 1945 near Cuxhaven
- Operation Backfire (FBI), an FBI operation against the radical environmental movement
- In economics, in the Jevons paradox, when the rebound effect exceeds 100%
- Backfire (Transformers), a fictional character
- "Backfire" (song) by Nate Haller and Tenille Townes, 2025
- Controlled burn or backfire, a firefighting technique
- Version 10.03 of the OpenWrt firmware
- The backfire effect, a phenomenon in psychology
- An occurrence of unintended consequences that are the opposite of the intended result, or detrimental (the "perverse result")
