= Elwy Yost =

Canadian television personality and writer

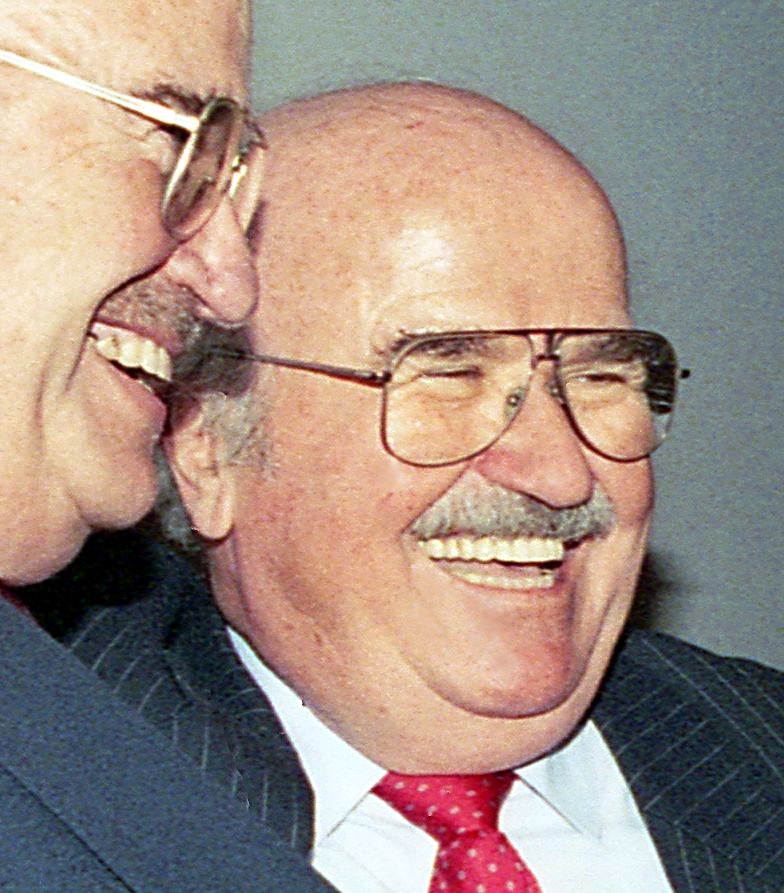
- Yost in 1993
- Born: Elwy McMurran Yost; July 10, 1925; Weston, Ontario, Canada
- Died: July 21, 2011 (aged 86); West Vancouver, British Columbia, Canada
- Occupation: Television host
- Years active: 1952–1999
- Known for: Passport to Adventure; Magic Shadows; Saturday Night at the Movies
- Spouse: Lila Ragnhild Melby
- Children: Christopher and Graham

Elwy McMurran Yost, CM (July 10, 1925 – July 21, 2011) was a Canadian television film historian, best known for hosting, for a quarter-century, Saturday Night at the Movies from 1974 to 1999. Earlier in his career, he hosted CBC Television's weekday Passport to Adventure series from 1965 to 1967, and TVOntario's weekday Magic Shadows, in the 1970s and early 1980s.

He was born in the Toronto suburb of Weston, Ontario and had an early exposure to cinema through his family sending him to see movies and report back on the plot. He served in World War II and after the war graduated from the University of Toronto. In the 1950s, he worked at Avro Canada, during the time that CF-105 Arrow program was being developed.

After the Arrow was cancelled, he transitioned to working as a Toronto-area public school teacher in the early 1960s, before switching over to working at CBC Television. He joined the nascent TV Ontario in the early 1970s, where he achieved his greatest fame. When he retired from broadcasting in 1999, he was awarded one of Canada's greatest civil honours, the Order of Canada. In the late 1980s, he and his wife moved to British Columbia, and that is where he died in late July 2011.

== Early life ==
Elwy McMurran Yost was born on 10 July 1925 in the Toronto suburb of Weston, Ontario. He was the son of pickle manufacturer Elwy Honderich Yost and Annie Josephine McMurran. In his youth, the senior Yost would give his son a dime a week to go see a movie on condition that he'd then recount the plot. Yost graduated from the Weston Collegiate and Vocational School in 1943.

He began studies at the University of Toronto in 1943, and studied engineering but left in 1944, after failing his exams, and joined the Canadian Infantry in 1944. He was honorably discharged in September 1945. After graduating from the University of Toronto with a Bachelor of Arts degree in Sociology in 1948, he worked variously in construction, at the Canadian National Exhibition, made an independent film with a classmate and acted in summerstock theatre. In 1951, he was working in the circulation department of the Toronto Star where he met his future wife, Lila Melby. In 1952 he acted in a small part in the movie Moulin Rouge. He also worked in the Avro Canada personnel department from 1953 until 1959 when he and most of the staff were laid off due to the cancellation of the Avro Arrow project. He then worked as an English and History teacher at Burnhamthorpe Collegiate Institute in Etobicoke, Ontario.

== Career in television ==
Through his acting connections, Yost learned that CBC was looking for quiz show panelists. Yost auditioned and, through the 1960s, appeared intermittently on the CBC as a panelist on shows such as Live a Borrowed Life, The Superior Sex and Flashback. In the mid-1960s, he created and hosted CBC's Passport to Adventure, featuring classic movie serials, and also assisted in the founding of the Metropolitan Educational Television Authority (META). In the late 1960s, he also hosted the CBC Radio show It's Debatable.

He joined the Ontario Educational Communications Authority (later TVOntario) in the early 1970s as a manager and, in 1974, was assisting with the establishment of its regional councils, when he was told OECA had acquired the broadcast rights to three Ingmar Bergman films and was asked if he had any ideas on how the station could air them in an educational context. Yost packaged the shows as Three Films in Search of God adding educational content in the form of interviews, introductions, and discussions, thus creating the model for what became Saturday Night at the Movies, which became the channel's longest-running, and one of its most popular, shows. Yost also developed Magic Shadows, which showed classic films in a serial format in half-hour early evening installments with introductions providing background and interesting details by Yost; the movie review show Rough Cuts; Talking Film and The Moviemakers. In 1979 he appeared in Ida Makes a Movie, the first of four television shorts that spawned The Kids of Degrassi Street in 1982 and by extension, the Degrassi media franchise.

The format of Saturday Night at the Movies was that of two movies, separated by in-depth interviews conducted by Yost. In the early years the interviews were with local film experts, but the show's producers took the opportunity to interview visiting actors when they had engagements in Toronto. As the show grew in popularity, funds were found to send Yost and a crew to Hollywood to arrange interviews with film personalities. His segment library includes interviews with the stars of classic films, character actors, directors, screenwriters, composers, film-editors, special-effects people, and sometimes even their children.

Yost acknowledged that both his wife Lila and producer Risa Shuman were critical in helping him make the show a success. His son, Graham Yost, is a screenwriter whose most famous credit was the hit 1994 film Speed. Speed was the final movie Yost hosted before retiring from Saturday Night at the Movies in 1999. Yost retired from TVOntario in 1999 and his last show was on 9 October 1999, where he introduced his replacement, CBC Radio's Shelagh Rogers.

== Death ==
Yost recovered from "a serious operation" he had in 2005, according to his wife, Lila. He died in West Vancouver, British Columbia on July 21, 2011, aged 86.

== Honours ==
A 1985 short comedy film, Working Title by film students Ken Scott and Fred Jones, featured a character who was an explicit parody of Yost. In 1999, he was made a Member of the Order of Canada. In the same year, he was awarded the Clyde Gilmour Award by the Toronto Film Critics Association. In 2021, TVOntario aired Magic Shadows, Elwy Yost: A Life in Movies, a documentary by Karen Shopsowitz about Yost's life and influence.

== Bibliography ==
Besides being a TV host, Yost was also a writer of fiction and non-fiction.

- Magic Moments from the Movies (1978) ISBN 978-0-385-13691-4
- Secrets of the Lost Empire (1980) ISBN 978-0-590-71055-8
- Billy and the Bubbleship (1982) ISBN 978-0-590-71093-0 *also published as The Mad Queen of Mordra
- The Mad Queen of Mordra (1987) ISBN 978-0-590-71787-8
- White Shadows: A Novel of Espionage and Adventure (2004) ISBN 978-1-55246-541-7
