= Delivery Man (film) =

2013 film by Ken Scott and Martin Petit

- Theatrical release poster
- Directed by: Ken Scott
- Screenplay by: Ken Scott
- Based on: Starbuck by: Ken Scott; Martin Petit
- Produced by: André Rouleau
- Starring: Vince Vaughn; Chris Pratt; Cobie Smulders
- Cinematography: Eric Edwards
- Edited by: Priscilla Nedd-Friendly
- Music by: Jon Brion
- Production companies: DreamWorks Pictures; Reliance Entertainment; Caramel Film
- Distributed by: Walt Disney Studios Motion Pictures (Note: Distributed by Walt Disney Studios Motion Pictures through the Touchstone Pictures banner.) (Select territories); Reliance Entertainment (India)
- Release date: November 22, 2013 (United States)
- Running time: 105 minutes
- Countries: India; United States; Canada
- Language: English
- Budget: $26 million
- Box office: $53.1 million

Delivery Man is a 2013 comedy-drama film written and directed by Ken Scott, produced by DreamWorks Pictures and Reliance Entertainment. It is a shot-for-shot remake of the 2011 Canadian film Starbuck, and stars Vince Vaughn, Chris Pratt, and Cobie Smulders.

It was released by Walt Disney Studios Motion Pictures (through the Touchstone Pictures banner) on November 22, 2013, received mixed reviews and grossed $53.1 million against a $26 million budget.

== Plot ==
David Wozniak is a deliveryman for his family's butcher shop, pursued by thugs to whom he owes $80,000. His girlfriend Emma, an NYPD officer, is pregnant with his child. One day, David returns from work to find a lawyer representing a sperm bank (where he gave 693 donations and earned a sum of $24,255 during his student years) who tells him that the clinic gave his samples to women in the clinic and that he has fathered 533 children. Of those, 142 have joined a class action lawsuit to force the fertility clinic to reveal the identity of "Starbuck," the alias he had used.

David's friend and lawyer Brett represents him as he tries to keep the records sealed. He provides him with profiles of each party to the lawsuit; David searches for them, finding moments for random acts of kindness. He covers for a struggling actor at his job so he can audition for a role. He pretends to be a pizza delivery man when he sees his daughter fighting with her boyfriend and saves her life as she ODs on drugs. He considers identifying himself but, after the thugs assault his father, he allows Brett to counter-sue the sperm bank for punitive damages. He wins the lawsuit, receives $200,000, and keeps his identity a secret.

David has regrets and thinks about revealing his identity. However, if he chooses to do so, he would lose the $200,000 that he won in the countersuit. Revealing to his father that he is Starbuck, his dad pays off David's debt. David finally reveals his identity on Facebook. Going to Emma's, he finds that she is going into premature labor. At the hospital, his baby is born, he proposes to Emma, and many of the children show up to see them.

In the closing sequence, David is shown to maintain contact with many of his children.

== Cast ==
- Vince Vaughn as David Wozniak
- Chris Pratt as Brett
- Cobie Smulders as Emma
- Andrzej Blumenfeld as Mikolaj Wozniak
- Simon Delaney as Victor
- Bobby Moynihan as Aleksy
- Dave Patten as Adam
- Adam Chanler-Berat as Viggo
- Britt Robertson as Kristen
- Jack Reynor as Josh
- Madison McGrew as Rachel
- Amos VanderPoel as Taylor
- Matthew Daddario as Channing
- Jessica Williams as Tanya
- Damian Young as Williams
- Richard Poe as Loan Officer
- Bruce Altman as Mass Action Attorney
- Alexander Flores as Teenage Clerk
- Glenn Fleshler as Coffee Shop Owner
- Jay Leno as himself
- Bill Maher as himself
- Stephen Ellis as 18th Century Professor

== Production ==
The film is a shot-for-shot remake of the 2011 French-Canadian film Starbuck, which was also directed by Ken Scott; Starbuck was also the working title for the English-language production.

Filming began in October 2012 in the Hudson Valley of New York. Filming then moved to New York City locales, in Brooklyn and Manhattan. Concerning the number of extras as the children, actor Dave Patten said, "There were ten of us who were constants on the sets so we didn’t really bond with the others who were extras. But the ten of us became a huge pack of friends and it was really nice. There are usually a lot of egos on set when it comes to a big cast which causes people not to get along but we didn’t have that issue."

== Release ==
Delivery Man was released worldwide in November 2013 by Walt Disney Studios Motion Pictures through the Touchstone Pictures label, except for India and most international territories, where the rights are sold by Mister Smith Entertainment to other independent distributors, including Entertainment One in the UK and Ireland. DreamWorks' financial partner, Reliance Entertainment released the film in India.

== Reception ==
Delivery Man received mixed reviews from critics. Review aggregation website Rotten Tomatoes gave the film a score of 40% based on reviews from 148 critics with an average score of 5.00/10. The site's consensus says: "It has an undeniably sweet charm, and Vince Vaughn is eminently likable in the lead role, but Delivery Man suffers in comparison to Starbuck, the hit Canadian comedy that inspired it." At Metacritic the film received a score of 44/100 based on reviews from 33 critics. Audiences polled by CinemaScore gave the film an average grade of "B+" on an A+ to F scale.

Alonso Duralde of The Wrap gave the film a negative review, stating that "Delivery Man offers comedy and sentimentality in equal doses and, unfortunately, equal efficacy—the jokes, the characters and the situations aren't very funny, and the would-be heart-tuggery is mostly embarrassing." Peter Debruge of Variety wrote, "Delivery Man is virtually nothing like a [typical] Vince Vaughn movie, but rather a heartfelt celebration of the act of parenthood presented under radically exaggerated circumstances... the director demonstrates the good sense not to mess with success, engineering what amounts to a scene-for-scene remake of that earlier feel-good outing—with the notable addition of Chris Pratt in his funniest supporting performance yet." Michael Rechtshaffen of The Hollywood Reporter wrote that "it's nice to see Vaughn moving out of his fast-talking comfort zone in a role that requires him to be more quietly reactive; while Parks and Recreation’s Pratt comically raises the second-banana bar as a put-upon dad itching to get back into the courtroom. While Smulders, unfortunately, isn't given the same opportunity to show off her comedic chops regularly on display on How I Met Your Mother, acclaimed Polish actor Andrzej Blumenfeld (in his American debut) makes a more empathetic impression as the warm Wozniak family patriarch."

== See also ==
- Fonzy, a 2013 French remake of Starbuck
