= Stéphane E. Roy =

Canadian actor, comedian and playwright (born 1968)

Stéphane Emmanuel Roy (born 31 May 1968 in Montreal, Quebec) is a Canadian actor, comedian and playwright. He was a member of the comedy group Les Bizarroïdes 1990–2000 with Ken Scott, Martin Petit, and Guy Lévesque.

In 2016, he directed a segment of the collective film 9 (9, le film), which was based on his own theatrical play 9 Variations on the Void (Neuf variations sur le vide). In 2025 he released Pédalo, a comedy-drama film again adapted from his own theatrical play which was his solo directorial debut.
