= David Giguère =

Canadian singer and actor

- Born: David Giguère
- Genres: Pop
- Years active: 2012-present
- Label: Audiogram

David Giguère is a Canadian singer-songwriter, and film, television and stage actor. He is from Quebec. He is signed to the Audiogram record label.

== Beginnings ==
After studying theatre at the CEGEP Collège Lionel-Groulx, Montreal, Quebec, he worked with Emmanuel Schwartz, and eventually Marc Beaupré with whom he had two roles in Caligula (remix) and Dom Juan... Uncensored

In 2011, he took part in Starbuck, a Quebec comedy film directed by Ken Scott and sang "L'atelier" on the soundtrack.

== Music career ==
In 2012 he released his debut album produced by Pierre-Philippe Côté (aka Pilou) and artistic collaboration and co-production by singer songwriter Ariane Moffatt and Mo'fat Productions. In August 2012, he engaged on a Quebec tour Tournée Sirius XM that also included Loco Locass and Pierre Lapointe and in 2013, he performed at Les FrancoFolies de Montréal. In 2014 he released his second album Casablanca on Audiogram.

== Discography ==
=== Albums ===
==== 2012: Hisser haut [Mo'fat Productions / Audiogram] ====
Track list

1. "Dépanneur" (1:03)
2. "Désirs" (2:53)
3. "L'Atelier" (3:22)
4. "1-2" (3:16)
5. "Encore" (3:19)
6. "Viens que je te griffe" (3:18)
7. "La chose" (3:11)
8. "C'est pas elle" (3:26)
9. "Madame M" (3:34)
10. "Hisser haut" (3:40)
11. "Carambolage" (2:54)
12. "Comme toi" (2:29)
13. "Permettez-moi (1:22)
14. Plus: Digital Booklet

==== 2014: Casablanca [Audiogram] ====
Track list

1. "Tuons nos enfants (4:29)
2. "La noyade (Mami Wata)" (3:51)
3. "L'Échec de l'Odéon" (3:23)
4. "La pornographie" (5:45)
5. "La honte" (4:40)
6. "Océanic 815 ** *****" (3:10)
7. "Gun" (3:20)
8. "Aimer aimer" (3:39)
9. "Albert Prévost" (2:34)
10. "La durée" (4:49)
11. "Casablanca" (5:39)
12. Plus: Digital Booklet

=== Singles / videography ===
- 2011: "Elle et lui"
- 2011: "L'atelier" (from soundtrack of Starbuck)
- 2012: "Encore"
- 2014: "La pornographie"
- 2014: "La noyade (Mami Wata)

== Filmography ==
- 2010: Un tueur si proche (1 episode "Mauvais coup (3 Ados)" as Félix - TV documentary series)
- 2011: Laurentie as brother of Louis
- 2011: Starbuck as speaker
- 2011: Le bleu des confettis (Short film)
- 2014: Série Noire (7 episodes as Mathieu - TV series)

=== Soundtrack ===
- 2011: Starbuck in song "L'atelier"

== Theatre ==
- 2012: Caligula (Remix) directed by Marc Beaupré to words of Albert Camus (Emmanuel Schwartz, David Giguère, Ève Landry, Guillaume Tellier, Michel Mongeau, Alexis Lefebvre, Emmanuelle Orange-Parent)
- 2012: Dom Juan... Uncensored directed by Marc Beaupré (David Giguère in title role)
