= Passport to Adventure =

Passport to Adventure is the name of:

- Passport to Adventure (TV series) (1965-1967), a Canadian television series
- an alternate title for the film Passport to Destiny (1944)
