= Saturday Night at the Movies =

Canadian television series

- Genre: films
- Presented by: Elwy Yost (1974-1999); Shelagh Rogers (1999-2000); Johanna Schneller (2004-2006); Thom Ernst (2006-2013)
- Country of origin: Canada
- Original language: English
- No. of seasons: 39

Production
- Producer: Risa Shuman (1974-2005)
- Production locations: Toronto, Ontario, Canada

Original release
- Network: TVOntario
- Release: March 30, 1974 – August 31, 2013

Saturday Night at the Movies was a weekly television series on TVOntario, the public educational television network in Ontario, Canada. The series presented classic movies, followed by interviews and feature segments with directors, actors and other people involved in making the films presented.

The show was initially formatted in this way due to requirements that all programming shown on TVO (including dramatic programming) needed to contain educational elements, which was usually accomplished by including interviews and analysis of the programming. Nevertheless, even after these requirements were dropped, the format was maintained.

The series typically aired two films per night, usually paired based on a shared star, director or theme. All told, the series presented almost 1,500 films and over 1,000 interviews.

The show was produced for much of its run by Risa Shuman.

== Broadcast history ==
=== Elwy Yost era ===
First aired on March 30, 1974, the program was originally hosted by Elwy Yost. The first film shown was Ingmar Bergman's Through a Glass Darkly. During Yost's 25-year tenure as host, he showed a variety of foreign films, but tended to concentrate on Hollywood-produced films from the 1930s through the 1950s, slowly expanding into also showing films from the 1960s and 1970s as the series progressed. Films shown spanned all genres; Yost famously said that of all the films he had ever seen in his life, he had disliked only two. For a number of years, however, the show was unable to broadcast films from the Warner Bros. studio, as TVOntario's transmitter in Windsor created a programming rights conflict with stations in Detroit.

Although the hosts did interview actors and film directors, they often interviewed film crew, such as cinematographers and film editors, who much more rarely receive widespread publicity. Because the show would present a film and then interviews with the creators of that film, Saturday Night at the Movies is sometimes humorously credited as being a pioneer of the DVD extra.

One noteworthy variation in the show's format occurred in January 1986 when a contemporary short film, Ken Scott and Fred Jones's Working Title, was aired as a bonus interstitial between the evening's feature films. The film was a mockumentary comedy about a film director, being interviewed about his problem-plagued production by an interviewer who was a deliberate parody of Yost.

In his final decade hosting the show, Yost lived in Vancouver, British Columbia, and would travel to Toronto to prepare many episodes of the show at once.

Yost retired as host of the series in 1999. The last film he presented was, atypically, a then-recent Hollywood blockbuster: Yost chose Speed to conclude his run as host, as it was written by his son, screenwriter Graham Yost. Around the same time as his retirement, he was inducted into the Order of Canada.

=== After Yost ===
Soon after Yost's retirement, the Progressive Conservative government of Mike Harris appointed Isabel Bassett as chair of TVOntario, with a mandate to refocus the network's broadcast schedule more clearly on education. Although there was some concern that the network would lose Saturday Night at the Movies, its highest-rated program, Bassett instead negotiated an agreement with York University to include the series in its film studies curriculum.

Yost was replaced as host for one season by Shelagh Rogers, concurrently with her continuing role as host of CBC Stereo's classical music program Take Five. When Rogers became the host of CBC Radio's morning news program This Morning in 2000, she left Saturday Night at the Movies, which briefly changed to a hostless format. At this time, the series added a Sunday night companion series, Sunday Night at the Cinema, which focused more on international film.

The program was then hosted by Johanna Schneller for two seasons beginning in 2004. The show's final host, for the remainder of its run, was Thom Ernst.

On November 13, 2012, it was announced that TVO would cancel Saturday Night at the Movies as of the end of the 2012-2013 season, amidst budget cuts incurred by the network. The final edition of Saturday Night at the Movies was broadcast on August 31, 2013, featuring two foreign films as its last movies: The Lives of Others (at 8 P.M.), and Black Book (starting at 10:50 P.M.)

Copies of many of the show's interviews have been donated to the archives of the Academy of Motion Picture Arts and Sciences.
