= Spoltore =

- Comune
- Comune di Spoltore
- Flag Coat of arms

- Location within Italy Location within Abruzzo
- Coordinates: 42°27′N 14°8′E
- Country: Italy
- Region: Abruzzo
- Province: Pescara (PE)
- Frazioni: Caprara d'Abruzzo, Castellana, Cavaticchi Inferiore, Cavatichi Superiore, Pescarina, Pescarina Superiore, Ripoli, Santa Lucia, Santa Teresa, Torretta, Villa Raspa, Villa Santa Maria

Government
  - Mayor: Luciano Di Lorito (PD)

Area
  - Total: 36 km^{2} (14 sq mi)
- Elevation: 185 m (607 ft)

Population (31 December 2006)
  - Total: 17,250
  - Density: 480/km^{2} (1,200/sq mi)
- Demonym: Spoltoresi
- Time zone: UTC+1 (CET)
  - Summer (DST): UTC+2 (CEST)
- Postal code: 65010
- Dialing code: 085
- Patron saint: San Panfilo (Saint Pamphilus of Sulmona)
- Saint day: April 28
- Website: Official website

Spoltore (locally Spuldórë) is a comune and town in the province of Pescara in the Abruzzo region of Italy, with a population of c. 17,000.

In 1928, Spoltore was annexed into Pescara, but separated from it again on 1 September 1947.

On 25 May 2014, the town residents, alongside the residents of neighboring cities of Montesilvano and Pescara voted in a referendum on merging into a single city. Spoltore voters approved the merger with 4892 (51.15%) Yes votes against 4672 (48.85%) No votes. The regional law approving the merger was passed on 8 August 2018, the deadline for the merger was set to be 1 January 2022, but it was later pushed back to 2023 and again to 2027.

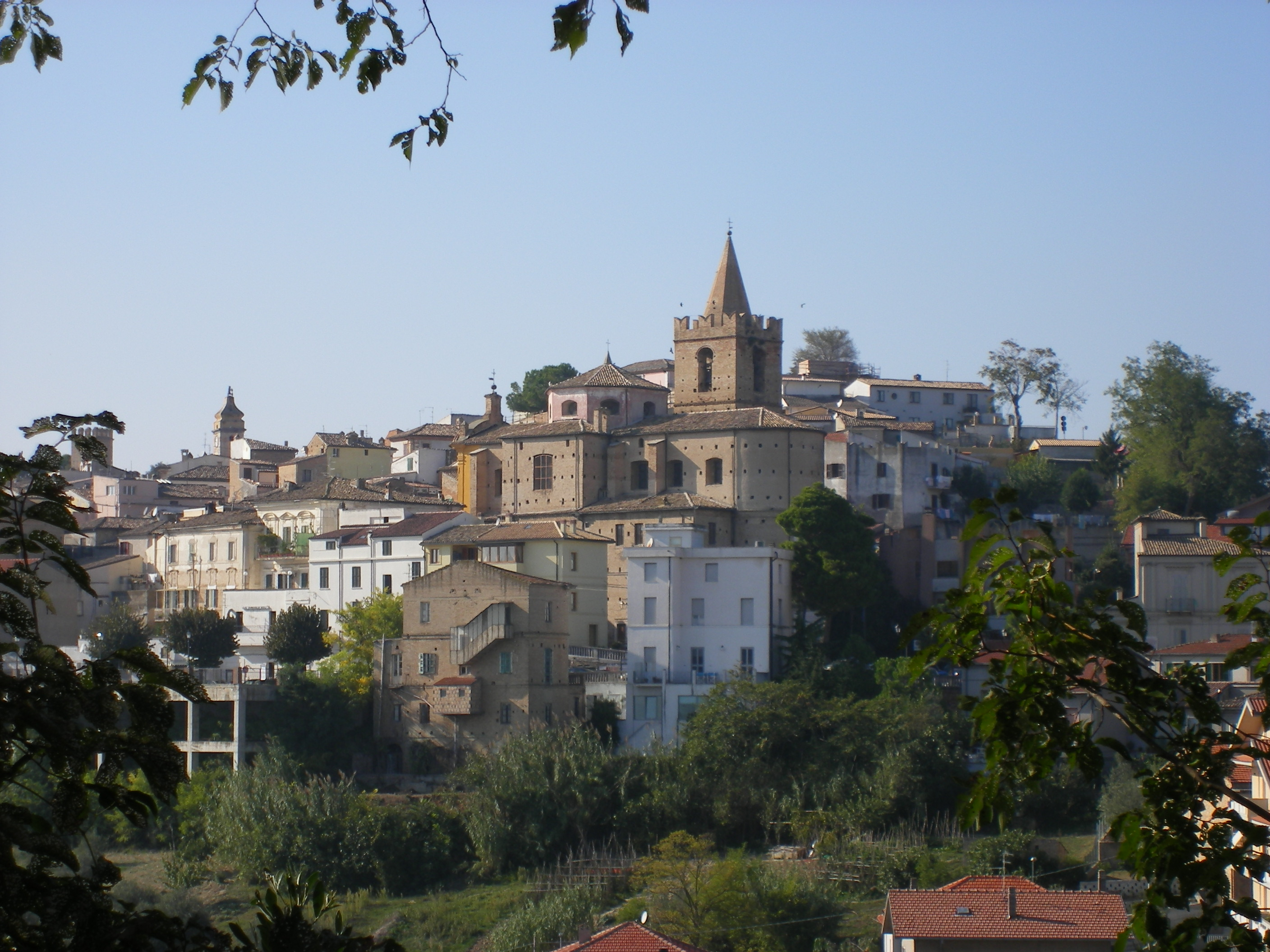
View of Spoltore.

== Personality ==
- Giuseppangelo Fonzi (1768-1840), dental surgeon and dental technician known for having improved the dental prostheses.
