= Mother Russia (play) =

Dark comedy play set in Russia

- Original language: English
- Written by: Lauren Yee
- Characters: Mother Russia; Evgeny; Dmitri; Katya
- Genre: Dark Comedy
- Setting: 1992 Russia

Premiere
- Date: February 3, 2026

Mother Russia is a dark comedy stage play written by American playwright Lauren Yee. It is part of a cycle of plays where Yee explores topics surrounding communism, and countries and people in a state of transition brought upon by Western influences. The play follows Evgeny as he grapples with a rapidly changing world and bizarre circumstances.

The play premiered on February 3, 2026 Off-Broadway at Signature Theatre Company.

== Plot ==
The play begins in 1992 post-Soviet Russia as the unassuming son (Evgeny) of a former powerful bureaucrat returns to his hometown of St. Petersburg. When a job assignment from Evgeny's father lands him in an unexpected reunion with his old friend Dmitri, a new business partnership ensues as the two take on a job surveilling former pop star Katya. Driven by love and the Filet-O-Fish flavored taste of capitalism, the story unravels as Evgeny finds himself as both pawn and perpetrator of an invisible hand.

The play also features a narrator who is none other than Mother Russia herself, functioning as both a witty commentator and a voice of reason.

== Production history ==
=== 2026 ===
The play premiered Off-Broadway at Signature Theatre Company on February 3, 2026 and had an extended run through March 29th due to popular demand. The production was directed by Teddy Bergman, featuring Adam Chanler-Berat as Evgeny, Steven Boyer as Dmitri, Rebecca Naomi Jones as Katya, and David Turner as Mother Russia.

=== 2025 ===
==== Seattle (March 6 - April 13) ====
Mother Russia had its world premiere at Seattle Repertory Theatre from March 6 to April 13, 2025. The production featured direction by Nicholas C. Avila, and the cast consisted of Billy Finn as Evgeny, Jesse Calixto as Dmitri, Andi Alhadeff as Katya, and Julie Briskman as Mother Russia.

==== Maine (May 1 - 18) ====
The Maine production was at Penobscot Theatre Company from May 1 to May 18, 2025. It was directed by Johnathan Berry and the cast was made up of Martin Guarnieri as Evgeny, Daniel Skinner as Dmitri, Stephanie Colavito as Katya, and Irene Dennis as Mother Russia.

==== Portland (June 5 - 22) ====
The Portland production was at Profile Theatre from June 5 to June 22, 2025. The production had direction by Josh Hecht and the cast featured Bets Swadis as Evgeny, Orion Bradshaw as Dmitri, Ashley Song as Katya, and Diane Kondrat as Mother Russia.

== Awards and nominations ==
=== 2026 ===
Year	Award	Category	Nominee	Result
2026	Lucille Lortel	Outstanding Play	Mother Russia	Nominated
2026	Lucille Lortel	Outstanding Featured Performer in a Play	David Turner	Won
