= O Night Divine (film) =

- Directed by: Luca Guadagnino
- Written by: Michael Mitnick
- Produced by: Luca Guadagnino; Daniela Venturelli
- Starring: John C. Reilly; Alex Wolff; Hailey Gates; Samia Benazzouz; Chloe Park; Valerio Santucci; Francesca Figus; Tania Hanyoung Park; Shi Yan Shi
- Cinematography: Arseni Khachaturan
- Edited by: Riccardo Giannetti
- Music by: Alberto Iglesias
- Production company: Frenesy Film Company
- Distributed by: Zara
- Release date: 14 December 2021
- Running time: 43 minutes
- Countries: Italy; Switzerland
- Language: English

O Night Divine is a 2021 short Christmas film directed by Luca Guadagnino. The film was produced in partnership with Spanish fashion retailer Zara, and features a script by Michael Mitnick. Mitnick had previously written the script for Guadagnino's 2019 short film The Staggering Girl, which was produced in collaboration with Italian luxury fashion house Valentino.

The short had a surprise release on Zara's YouTube channel on December 14, 2021.

== Synopsis ==
On a snowy Christmas Eve at a grand mountainside hotel in St. Moritz, Switzerland, five people's lives magically intersect to unlock a madcap night of outrageous adventures and joyous celebration.

== Cast ==
- John C. Reilly as Kristof
- Alex Wolff as Hugo
- Hailey Gates as Babette
- Samia Benazzouz as Sophia
- Chloe Park as Lucia
- Valerio Santucci as Marcello
- Francesca Figus as Julia
- Tnia Hanyoung Park as Lucia's Mama
- Shi Yang Shi as Lucia's Papa

== Production ==
The film was shot on location in St. Moritz at the Suvretta House luxury hotel.
