= Rebecca Naomi Jones =

American actress and singer (born 1981)

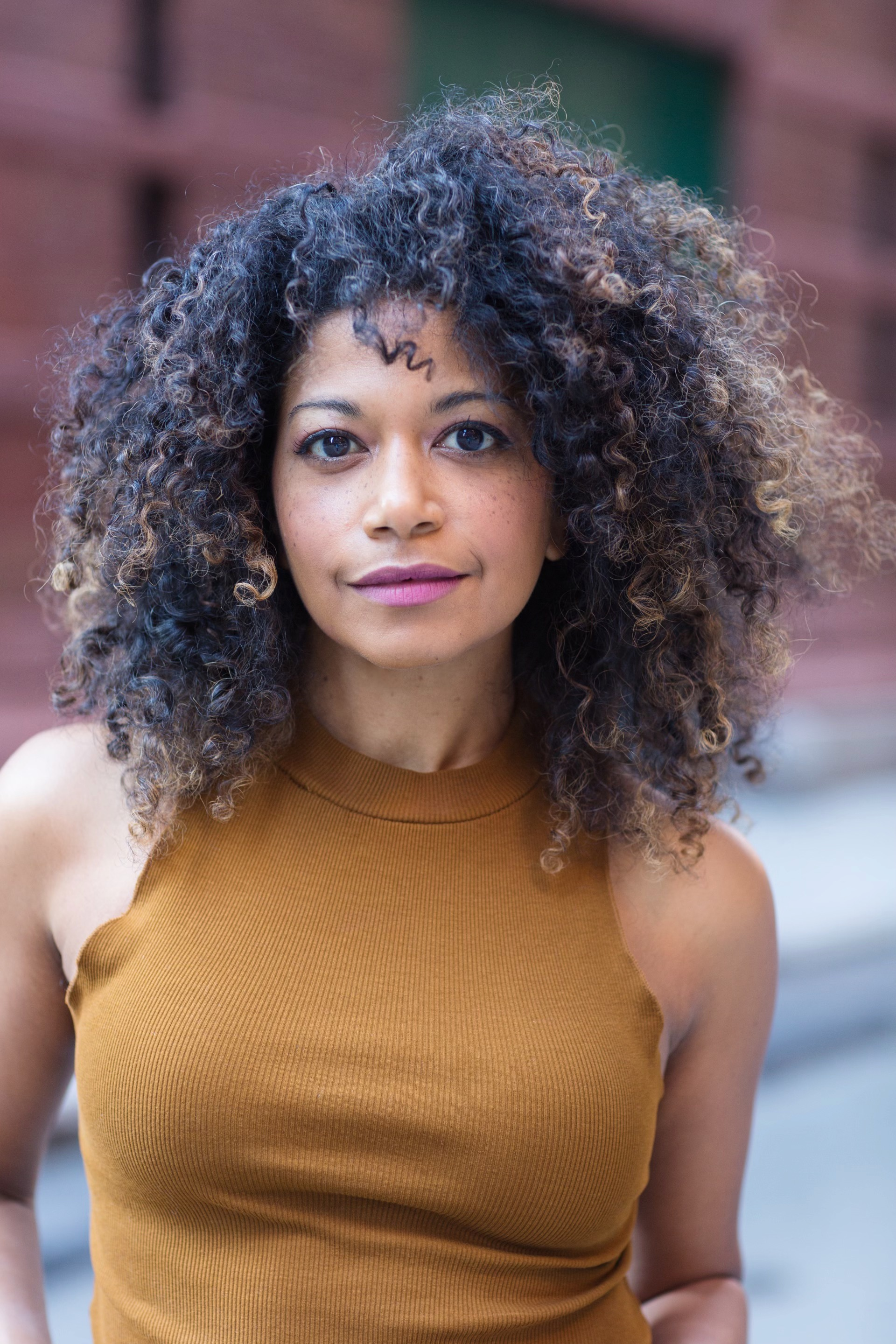
- Jones in 2023
- Born: March 31, 1981 (age 45); New York City, U.S.
- Education: University of North Carolina School of the Arts (BFA)
- Occupations: Actress; singer
- Years active: 2007–present

Rebecca Naomi Jones (born March 31, 1981) is an American actress and singer best known for her performances in the Broadway rock musicals Passing Strange, American Idiot, and Hedwig and the Angry Inch as well as being the first woman of color to play Laurey in Oklahoma! on Broadway. She also starred more recently in New York City's Shakespeare in the Park adaptation of As You Like It.

== Life and career ==
Jones was born in New York City, to a musician father and photographer mother. Her mother is Jewish and her father is African-American. Jones performed in the children's chorus of the Metropolitan Opera as a child and graduated from the Berkeley Carroll School in 1999. "I did theatre all throughout middle school and high school and was really into it, the same with singing," she said. Jones received her BFA in drama from the University of North Carolina School of the Arts and appeared in the national tours of Rent and Caroline, or Change.

In 2007 Jones made her Off-Broadway debut in Passing Strange, which transferred to Broadway on February 28, 2008. She originated the role of Whatsername in the Green Day rock opera American Idiot, which opened on Broadway on April 20, 2010. Paper magazine said of Jones, "She's carved out a nice niche for herself as the girl to call when there's a cooler-than-thou musical in town."

In 2012 Jones played the Narrator in Manhattan Theatre Club's Off-Broadway musical Murder Ballad, for which she received a Lucille Lortel Award nomination for Outstanding Featured Actress. Jones returned for the show's engagement at the Union Square Theatre, which ran from May 22, 2013, to July 21, 2013. Later that summer, Jones appeared as Jaquenetta in a new musical adaptation of Love's Labour's Lost at Central Park's Delacorte Theater.

On June 2, 2014, Jones received a Lilly Award, a prize honoring women in the theater.

On April 14, 2015, Jones replaced Lena Hall as Yitzhak in the Broadway production of Hedwig and the Angry Inch. Jones played the role through the production's end on September 13.

In 2017 she starred as Vanessa in Significant Other on Broadway.

In 2018 Jones starred as Laurey Williams in Daniel Fish's production of Oklahoma! at St. Ann's Warehouse. The production transferred to Broadway at the Circle in the Square Theatre in March 2019.

In September 2025, Jones took over the role of Persephone in the musical Hadestown on Broadway.

== Filmography ==
=== Film ===
Year	Title	Role	Notes
2008	Miracle at St. Anna	Zana Wilder's assistant	
2009	Passing Strange	Sherry / Renata / Desi	
2010	The Switch	Party guest	
2014	Lovesick	Nancy	
2014	You Must Be Joking	Newscaster	
2015	Mistress America	Party hostess	
2015	Ratter	Nicole	
2016	Ordinary World	Gypsy	
2017	The Big Sick	Jesse	
2018	Most Likely to Murder	Elena	
2018	French Fries	Sydney	Short film
2019	Someone Great	Leah	
2020	The Outside Story	Amy	
2026	Influenced	Pam	

=== Television ===
Year	Title	Role	Notes
2009	Great Performances	Sherry / Renata / Desi	Episode: "Passing Strange"
2009	Fringe	Risa Pears	Episode: "Bad Dreams"
2010	America's Got Talent	Whatsername	Episode: "Top Ten Results"
2010	Late Night with Jimmy Fallon	Whatsername	Season 2, episode 137
2010	Macy's Thanksgiving Day Parade	Herself	TV special
2011	Law & Order: Special Victims Unit	Leila	Episode: "Bombshell"
2011	Nurse Jackie	Sister Anne	2 episodes: "Game On" and "Enough Rope"
2011	Pzazz 101	Herself	Episode: "Rebecca Naomi Jones"
2012	Smash	Laura	Episode: "Enter Mr. DiMaggio"
2012	NYC 22	Monica Pridgen	Episode: "Block Party"
2013	Broadway Idiot	Herself	Documentary
2013	The Broadway.com Show	Herself	Season 1, episode 18
2014	Blue Bloods	Barbara Keyes	Episode: "Manhattan Queens"
2015	Good Girls Revolt	Danielle	Episode: "Pilot"
2016	Limitless	Alice	Episode: "Finale: Part One!"
2016	Inside Amy Schumer	Commercial Actress No. 3	Episode: "The World's Most Interesting Woman in the World"
2016	Difficult People	Alison	Episode: "Carter"
2016–18	High Maintenance	Gwen	2 episodes
2016	Sex & Drugs & Rock & Roll	Davvy	5 episodes
2017	Odd Mom Out	Dylan	Episode: "Star Gazing"
2021	Genius	Carolyn Franklin	8 episodes
2022	And Just Like That...	Shelly Jenkins	Episode: "Some of My Best Friends"
2023	Black Cake	Lynette	3 episodes
2024	The Pradeeps of Pittsburgh	Dr. Hewitt	Episode: "Interrogation Log #3"
2025	Power Book III: Raising Kanan	Mara	4 episodes
2025–present	Your Friends & Neighbors	Suzanne Haber	Recurring role

=== Theatre ===
Year	Title	Role	Notes
2007	Passing Strange	Sherry / Renata / Desi	Off-Broadway; Broadway
2008	Wig Out!	Fay	Off-Broadway
2009	This Beautiful City	Performer	Off-Broadway
2010	American Idiot	Whatsername	Broadway
2012	Murder Ballad	Narrator	Off-Broadway
2013	Love's Labour's Lost	Jaquenetta	Off-Broadway
2014	The Fortress of Solitude	Lala / Abby	Off-Broadway
2015	Big Love	Lydia	Off-Broadway
2015	Hedwig and the Angry Inch	Yitzhak	Broadway
2016	Cost of Living	Jess	Williamstown Theatre Festival
2016	Kurt Vonnegut's God Bless You, Mr. Rosewater	Mary Moody / Blanche	New York City Center Encores! Off-Center
2016	Marie and Rosetta	Marie Knight	Atlantic Theatre Company
2017	Significant Other	Vanessa	Broadway
2018	Fire in Dreamland	Kate	Off-Broadway
2018	Oklahoma!	Laurey Williams	Off-Broadway
2019	Oklahoma!	Laurey Williams	Broadway
2022	As You Like It	Rosalind	Off-Broadway
2023	I Can Get It for You Wholesale	Ruthie Rivkin	Off-Broadway
2024	Stereophonic	Holly	Broadway
2025	Hadestown	Persephone	Broadway
2026	Mother Russia	Katya	Off-Broadway

== Awards and nominations ==
Year	Award	Category	Work	Result	Ref.
2008	Obie Award	Distinguished Performance by an Ensemble	Passing Strange	Won	
2013	Lucille Lortel Award	Outstanding Featured Actress in a Musical	Murder Ballad	Nominated	
2015	Drama League Award	Distinguished Performance	Big Love	Nominated	
2019	Drama Desk Awards	Outstanding Actress in a Musical	Oklahoma!	Nominated	
2020	Grammy Award	Best Musical Theater Album	Oklahoma!	Nominated	
