= Thom Ernst =

Canadian television host

Thom Ernst is a Canadian film critic and television host, best known as the final host of the television film series Saturday Night at the Movies.

Originally from Waubamik, Ontario, he later moved to Waterloo Region, attending Waterloo-Oxford District Secondary School and the University of Waterloo.

He began his career as a writer of stage plays, including Masculine Slaps, Kings and Little Ones, Henry Winkler Eats Free, and To Quiet Blue. He wrote the screenplay for Rosa's Time, a short film that screened at the 1998 Sundance Film Festival.

He joined Saturday Night at the Movies in 1998 as a researcher and interviewer, eventually becoming host of the show in the latter half of the 2000s. In 2000 he began appearing as a film critic on radio and television, including regular contributions to CBC Radio One, CBC Television and CTV News Channel. He has written as a freelancer for publications including the Toronto Star, Toro, Northern Stars, Original Cin and the National Post, and became a member of the Toronto Film Critics Association in 2011.

More recently he has hosted the television series Making Movies for TV1, the podcast This Movie Is About You, and the radio program Reel Jazz Radio, devoted to jazz and blues film music, for CJRT-FM.

In 2023 he published The Wild Boy of Waubamik, a memoir of his childhood experiences as a victim of physical and sexual abuse by his adoptive father.
