= The Fortress of Solitude (musical) =

- Off-Broadway promotional art
- Music: Michael Friedman
- Lyrics: Michael Friedman
- Book: Itamar Moses
- Basis: The Fortress of Solitude by Jonathan Lethem
- Productions: 2012 Poughkeepsie; 2014 Dallas; 2014 Off-Broadway

The Fortress of Solitude is a musical with music and lyrics written by Michael Friedman, and a book by Itamar Moses adapted from The Fortress of Solitude by Jonathan Lethem.

== Synopsis ==
According to The Public Theater's website, "The Fortress of Solitude is the extraordinary coming-of-age story about 1970s Brooklyn and beyond — of black and white, soul and rap, block parties and blackouts, friendship and betrayal, comic books and 45s. And the story of what would happen if two teenagers obsessed with superheroes believed that maybe, just maybe, they could fly".

== Productions ==
The musical premiered at Vassar College and New York Stage and Film's Powerhouse Theatre, as a part of the Martel Musical Workshops (concert readings of works-in-progress), opening on June 29, 2012 and closing July 1. The show was directed (and originally conceived) by Daniel Aukin, with Kyle Beltran, Alex Brightman, John Ellison Conlee, André De Shields, Carla Duren, Santino Fontana, Brandon Gill, Conlin Hanlon, Rebecca Naomi Jones, Jahi Kearse, Meghan McGeary, Lauren Molina, and David St. Louis.

The Dallas production at Dallas Theater Center opened on March 7, 2014 and closed on April 6. The show was directed by Daniel Aukin, set design Eugene Lee, lighting design Tyler Micoleau, costume design Jessica Pabst, sound design Robert Kaplowitz, projection design Jeff Sugg, wig design Leah J. Loukas, choreography Camille A. Brown, musical director Kimberly Grigsby, orchestrations John Clancy & Matt Beck. The band was composed of Grigsby (conductor, keyboard 2), Alex Vorse (associate music director, keyboard 1, keyboard programmer), Joe Lee (guitar), Peggy Honea (bass), Mike Drake (drums), Jorge Ginorio (Latin percussion), Pete Brewer (reeds), Cathy Richardson (viola/violin), and Larry Spencer (trumpet/Fleugelhorn/piccolo trumpet).

The Off-Broadway production opened on September 30, 2014 (previews), officially on October 22 at The Public Theater, a co-production with the Dallas Theater Center. The show was directed by Daniel Aukin with choreography by Camille A. Brown. The show closed on November 16.

== Cast ==
Character	Vassar College (2012)	Dallas (2014)	Public Theatre (2014)
Abraham Ebdus	John Ellison Conlee	Alex Organ	Ken Barnett
Mingus Rude	Kyle Beltran	Kyle Beltran	Kyle Beltran
Dylan Ebdus	Santino Fontana	Adam Chanler-Berat	Adam Chanler-Berat
Barrett Rude Senior	André De Shields	André De Shields	André De Shields
Barrett Rude Junior	David St. Louis	Kevin Mambo	Kevin Mambo
Marilla	Carla Duren	Traci Lee	Carla Duren
Robert Woolfolk	Brandon Gill	Nicholas Christopher	Brian Tyree Henry
Arthur Lomb	Alex Brightman	Etai BenShlomo	David Rossmer
Lala / Abby	Rebecca Naomi Jones	Carla Duren	Rebecca Naomi Jones
Raf / Henry / Desmond / Jared/ Timothy	Jahi Kearse	Jahi Kearse	Jahi Kearse
Radio Guy / Mike / Gabe	Colin Hanlon	Jeremy Allen Dumont	Conor Ryan
Rachel Ebdus / Mrs. Lomb	Meghan McGeary	Patty Breckenridge	Kristen Sieh
Skater Girl / Liza	Lauren Molina	Alison Hodgson	Alison Whitehurst
Subtle Distinction		Britton Smith, Akron Watson, Juson Williams	Britton Smith, Akron Watson, Juson Williams
Swing			Stephanie Duret, Malaiyka Reid, Noah Ricketts

== Musical numbers ==
Source: CurtainUp

Act 1

- Prelude — Barrett Rude Junior, Subtle Distinction, Dylan, Rachel
- The One I Remember — Full Company
- The Time Keeps Changing — Dylan, Barrett Rude Junior, Rachel
- (You Gotta) Grab Something — Barrett Rude Junior, Subtle Distinction
- Superman/Sidekick — Mingus, Dylan, Barret Rude Junior, Subtle Distinction
- White Boy — Arthur, Abby, Marilla, Dylan
- The Ballad of Barrett Rude, Sr. — Barrett Rude Senior, Abby, Marilla, Liza
- Painting — Abraham, Mingus
- This Little World — Mingus, Rachel, Abraham, Dylan, Barrett Rude Junior
- Take Me to the Bridge — Barrett Rude Senior, Mingus, Dylan, Ensemble
- High High High School/Fuck You Up — Mike, Skate Girl, Dylan, Robert, Arthur
- I'm Busy Now (So Don't Bother Me) — Marilla, Lala, Subtle Distinction, Ensemble

Act 2

- Act Two Prelude — Rachel
- If I Had Known Then (What I Know Now) — Barrett Rude Junior, Subtle Distinction
- Bothered Blue — Barrett Rude Junior, Subtle Distinction, Dylan, Rachel
- Take It Baby — Barrett Rude Junior, Subtle Distinction, Dylan, Rachel
- Who's Calling Me — Barrett Rude Junior, Subtle Distinction, Dylan, Rachel
- Something — Abby, Rachel, Abraham
- This Little World (Reprise) — Dylan, Abby, Rachel, Barrett Rude Junior, Subtle Distinction
- The Ballad of Mingus Rude — Mingus, Robert, Ensemble
- Superman/Superman (Reprise) — Mingus, Ensemble
- The Gift — Rachel, Ensemble
- Middle Space — Dylan, Mingus, Ensemble

== Awards and nominations ==
=== Original Off-Broadway production ===
Year	Award Ceremony	Category	Nominee	Result
2015	Drama Desk Awards	Outstanding Music	Michael Friedman	Nominated
2015	Drama Desk Awards	Outstanding Lyrics	Michael Friedman	Nominated
2015	Outer Critic's Circle Awards	Outstanding New Off-Broadway Musical		Nominated
