= Adam Chanler-Berat =

American actor (born 1986)

- Born: December 31, 1986 (age 39); West Nyack, Rockland County, New York
- Education: Marymount Manhattan College
- Occupations: Actor, singer
- Years active: 2006–present

Adam Brian Chanler-Berat (born December 31, 1986) is an American stage and film actor and singer. He is best known for his work on Broadway, originating the roles of Henry in Next to Normal (2008–2011), Boy in Peter and the Starcatcher (2011–2013), and Nino in Amélie (2015–2017). Since 2021, he has played teacher Jordan Glassberg in HBO Max's Gossip Girl.

== Early life ==
Chanler-Berat was born in West Nyack, Rockland County, New York, to Shelley Chanler and Bert Berat.

== Career ==
=== Theatre ===
Chanler-Berat made his Off-Broadway debut in the 2008 musical Next to Normal (originally stylized as next to normal), which later transferred to Broadway in 2009. He stayed with the show from its original production at Second Stage Theatre to its closing night on Broadway exactly three years later, being the only cast member to have done so.

Following Next to Normal's closing, Chanler-Berat was cast in the role of Boy (Peter) in the Off-Broadway play Peter and the Starcatcher, based on the book of the same name. The show transferred to Broadway in early 2012, and he remained with the production until its closing during the January of the next year.

After Peter and the Starcatcher, Chanler-Berat participated in a number of Regional and Off-Broadway productions, including Fly By Night as Harold McClam, The Fortress of Solitude as Dylan Ebdus, Sunday in the Park with George as Georges Seurat, and Amélie as Nino, the latter of which transferred to Broadway in 2017.

In 2018, Chanler-Berat starred on Broadway in the play Saint Joan as the Dauphin, Charles VII.

Beginning in 2021, he starred in a limited run Off-Broadway revival of Assassins by Classic Stage Company. The production was directed by John Doyle. Chanler-Berat played John Hinckley Jr., the attempted assassin of President Ronald Reagan. Originally scheduled to play from April 2 to May 17, 2020, it eventually ran from November 2, 2021 to January 24, 2022. The production was nominated for a number of awards at the 2022 Lucille Lortel Awards, including Best Revival.

=== Film and television ===
In addition to his theatre work, Chanler-Berat has appeared in a number of supporting roles in television and film, beginning with an episode of Law and Order in 2006. Possibly his most notable on screen role is that of Viggo in Delivery Man, a 2013 movie starring Vince Vaughn. Chanler-Berat is currently featured in the reboot of Gossip Girl on HBO Max.

== Acting credits ==
=== Film ===
| Year | Title | Role | Notes |
|---|---|---|---|
| 2007 | The Life Before Her Eyes | Ryan | |
| 2013 | Delivery Man | Viggo | |

=== Television ===
| Year | Title | Role | Notes |
|---|---|---|---|
| 2006 | Law and Order | Jason Wade | Episode: "Magnet" |
| 2013 | The Good Wife | Tad Werner | Episode: "Invitation to an Inquest" |
| 2013-14 | It Could Be Worse | Ben Farrel | Web series; 15 episodes |
| 2014 | Veep | Mark | Episode: "The Choice" |
| 2015 | Elementary | Brady Dietz | Episode: "One Sherlock, One Holmes" |
| 2017 | Doubt | Lester | Episode: "Pilot" |
| 2019 | The Code | Lt. Glen 'One-N' Eick | 3 episodes |
| 2019 | NCIS: New Orleans | Steven Marx | Episode: "Boom-Boom-Boom-Boom" |
| 2019 | Soundtrack | Asher Katz | Episode: "Track 8: Gigi and Jean" |
| 2021-23 | Gossip Girl | Jordan Glassberg | Main cast; 22 episodes |

=== Video games ===
| Year | Title | Role | Notes |
|---|---|---|---|
| 2006 | Bully | Norton Williams | Motion capture and voice; as "Adam Chandler-Berat" |

=== Theatre ===
| Year | Production | Role | Category | Theater | Notes |
|---|---|---|---|---|---|
| 2008 | Next to Normal | Henry | Off-Broadway | Second Stage Theatre | January 16 – March 16, 2008 |
| 2008-09 | Next to Normal | Henry | Regional | Arena Stage | November 21, 2008 – January 18, 2009 |
| 2009-11 | Next to Normal | Henry | Broadway | Booth Theatre | March 27, 2009 – January 16, 2011 |
| 2011 | Peter and the Starcatcher | Boy (Peter) | Off-Broadway | New York Theatre Workshop | February 18 – April 24, 2011 |
| 2012-13 | Peter and the Starcatcher | Boy (Peter) | Broadway | Brooks Atkinson Theatre | March 28, 2012 – January 20, 2013 |
| 2011-12 | Rent | Mark Cohen | Off-Broadway | New World Stages | July 14, 2011 – January 2012 |
| 2013 | Animal Crackers | Zeppo, Horatio, John | Regional | Williamstown Theatre Festival | June 26 – July 14, 2013 |
| 2014 | The Fortress of Solitude | Dylan Ebdus | Regional | Dallas Theater Center | March 7 – April 6, 2014 |
| 2014 | The Fortress of Solitude | Dylan Ebdus | Off-Broadway | The Public Theater | September 30 – November 16, 2014 |
| 2014 | Fly By Night | Harold | Off-Broadway | Playwrights Horizons | May 16 – June 29, 2014 |
| 2015 | Amélie | Nino | Regional | Berkeley Repertory Theatre | August 29 – October 18, 2015 |
| 2016-17 | Amélie | Nino | Regional | Ahmanson Theatre | December 4, 2016 – January 15, 2017 |
| 2017 | Amélie | Nino | Broadway | Walter Kerr Theatre | March 9 – May 21, 2017 |
| 2016 | Sunday in the Park with George | George | Regional | Huntington Theatre | September 9 – October 16, 2016 |
| 2017 | This Ain't No Disco | | Workshop | Vogelstein Center | June 30 – July 2, 2017 |
| 2018 | Saint Joan | Dauphin, Charles VII | Broadway | Samuel J. Friedman Theatre | April 3 – June 10, 2018 |
| 2018 | The Year To Come | Jim | Regional | La Jolla Playhouse | December 4–30, 2018 |
| 2019 | Nantucket Sleigh Ride | Poe | Off-Broadway | Newhouse Theater | February 21 – May 5, 2019 |
| 2020 | How to Load a Musket | David | Off-off-Broadway | 59E59 Theaters | January 11–26, 2020 |
| 2021-22 | Assassins | John Hinckley Jr. | Off-Broadway | Classic Stage Company | November 2, 2021 – January 24, 2022 |
| 2023 | A New Brain | Gordon Schwinn | Regional | Barrington Stage Company | August 16 – September 10, 2023 |
| 2023 | I Can Get It For You Wholesale | Meyer Bushkin | Off-Broadway | Classic Stage Company | October 10 – December 3, 2023 |
| 2024 | Titanic | First Officer Murdoch | Off-Broadway | Encores! | |
| 2025-26 | Slanted Floors | Kaplan | Off-Off-Broadway | Site-specific Apartment | |
| 2026 | Mother Russia | Evgeny | Off-Broadway | Signature Theatre Company | March 3 - 29, 2026 |
| 2026 | Slanted Floors | Kaplan | Off-Broadway | Astor Place Theatre | |

=== Staged readings and concerts ===
| Year | Production | Role | Theater | Notes |
|---|---|---|---|---|
| 2009 | Band Geeks! | | New World Stages | NAMT concert |
| 2014 | My Favorite Year | Benjy Stone | York Theatre Company | Musicals in Mufti concert |
| 2015 | Zorba! | | New York City Center | Encores! concert |
| 2017 | My Favorite Year | | Feinstein's/54 Below | Concert |
| 2017 | Darling Grenadine | | New World Stages | NAMT concert |
| 2019 | The Last Sunday in June | | Rattlestick Playwrights Theater | Reading |
| 2020 | Adrienne and The White Bird | The White Bird | Rattlestick Playwrights Theater | Reading |

== Discography ==
Podcasts

- The Fall of the House of Sunshine

Cast recordings

- 2009: Next to Normal (Original Broadway Cast Recording)
- 2015: Fly By Night (Original Off-Broadway Cast Recording)
- 2015: The Fortress of Solitude (Original Cast Recording)
- 2017: Amélie - A New Musical (Original Broadway Cast Recording)
- 2020: (I Am) Nobody's Lunch (World Premiere Recording)
- 2022: Assassins (Off-Broadway Cast Recording)

== Personal life ==
Chanler-Berat is of Jewish descent.
