= The Superior Sex =

- Genre: Game show
- Country of origin: Canada
- Original language: English
- No. of seasons: 1

Production
- Producer: Drew Crossan
- Running time: 30 minutes

Original release
- Network: CBC Television
- Release: 5 July – 20 September 1961

The Superior Sex is a Canadian game show that aired on CBC Television in 1961.

== Premise ==
Elwy Yost moderated this game show in which a team of men competed against a team of women in skills such as golf putting, darts and quiz questions. Corinne Conley, Susan Fletcher, Royce Frith and Paul Kligman also appeared regularly.

== Scheduling ==
This half-hour program was broadcast on Wednesdays at 10:00 p.m. from 5 July to 20 September 1961.
