= Michael Mitnick =

American playwright (born 1983)

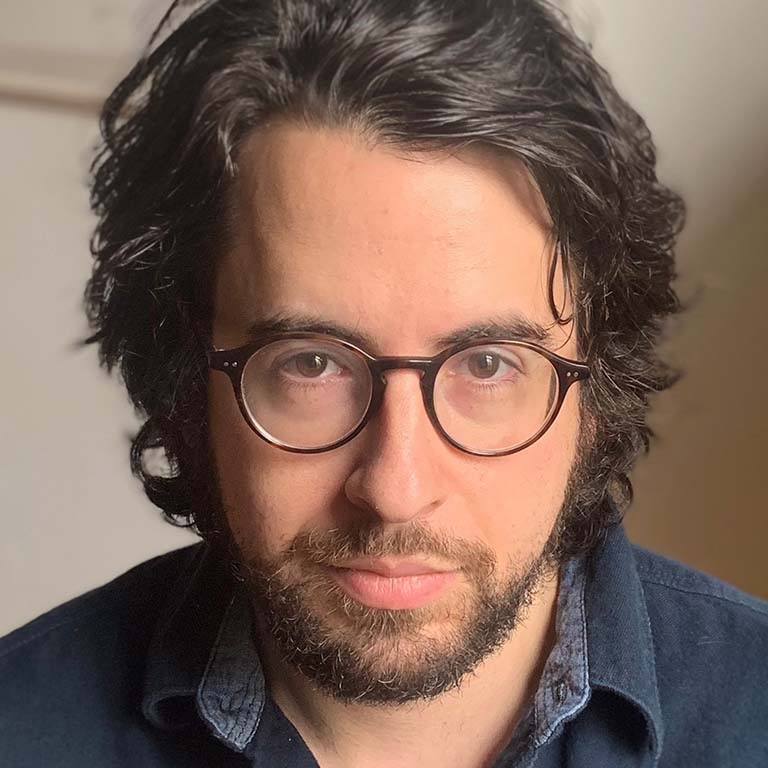
- Mitnick in 2019
- Born: September 7, 1983 (age 43); Pittsburgh, Pennsylvania, U.S.
- Education: Harvard University (BA); Yale University (MFA)
- Spouse: Jessica Brickman (m. 2019)
- Writing career
- Notable works: The Current War (2017); Fly By Night (2014); The Giver (2014)
- Notable awards: Drama Desk Best Musical Nominee (2015)

Michael Mitnick (born September 7, 1983) is an American playwright and screenwriter.

== Early life ==
Mitnick grew up in Pittsburgh, Pennsylvania and attended Fox Chapel Area High School, a public school in the Allegheny Valley. As a high school student, he worked in the graphic design department of WQED Pittsburgh and Mister Rogers' Neighborhood. His father is a professor at the University of Pittsburgh business school. His mother is a public librarian.

Mitnick attended Harvard University, where he wrote or co-wrote four musical comedies, including one Hasty Pudding Theatricals show. His musical Snapshots had two off-Broadway performances in New York. He was a member of the a cappella group the Krokodiloes. After graduating in 2006, Mitnick worked at The Atlantic Monthly before earning his Master of Fine Arts degree in playwriting from the Yale School of Drama.

== Career ==
=== Plays ===
Title	Venue	Year
Elijah	Yale School of Drama	2010 with Lupita Nyong'o
Babs the Dodo	Washington Ensemble Theatre, Seattle	2011
Sex Lives of our Parents	Second Stage, New York	2011
Ed, Downloaded	Denver Center Theater Company	2013
Spacebar a Broadway Play by Kyle Sugarman	The Wild Project, New York	2014
The Siegel	South Coast Repertory, Costa Mesa	2017
Mysterious Circumstance	The Geffen Playhouse, New York	2019
Scotland, PA	Roundabout Theatre Company	2019

=== Film ===
Title	Year
The Giver	2014
The Current War	2017
The Staggering Girl	2019
Oh Night Divine	2021
Muppet Man	TBA
Light of Days	TBA

=== Television ===
Title	Channel	Year
Vinyl	HBO	2016
Siegfried & Roy	HBO	TBA
Dial M for Murder	MGM	TBA

=== Music ===
Mitnick co-wrote the holiday song "Christmas You Go So Fast," which was featured on Vinyl.

He also co-wrote, with Will Connolly and Kim Rosenstock, the musical, Fly By Night, which released a cast recording for its Off-Broadway run.

== Honors ==
He received the 2012 Visionary Playwright Award from Theater Masters.

Variety magazine selected Mitnick as one of "10 Screenwriters to watch" in 2013. He is a two-time winner of the Edgerton New American Foundation Award, for The Siegel (2017) and Fly By Night (2011), the latter of which was also nominated for four 2015 Drama Desk Awards including Best Musical.

== Works in development ==
In May 2017, Deadline placed Mitnick's original screenplay Some Are Born Great on its 2017 Cannes Hotlist, and he was slated to direct the film.

Mitnick is reported to be writing the screenplay for a forthcoming Audrey Hepburn biopic.
