= Passport to Adventure (TV series) =

- Also known as: Passport
- Presented by: Elwy Yost
- Country of origin: Canada
- Original language: English
- No. of seasons: 2

Production
- Executive producer: John Twomey
- Producers: Doug Davidson (1965–1966); Ed Mercel (1966–1967)

Original release
- Network: CBC Television
- Release: 18 October 1965 – 30 June 1967

Passport to Adventure, later retitled Passport, is a Canadian film television series that aired on CBC Television from 1965 to 1967.

== Premise ==
The series presented American and British films of the 1930s through to the 1960s, subdivided for broadcast into a serial format during each week. The series can be perceived as a viewer's digest of some of the best films ever to have been produced up to that time. Episodes included interviews with actors and film experts such as Douglas Fairbanks, Jr., Elwood Glover, Arthur Treacher and Willard Van Dyke.

== Scheduling ==
This half-hour series was broadcast Mondays to Thursdays at 5:00 p.m. (Eastern) from 18 October 1965 to 30 June 1966. The series was retitled Passport for its second season from 17 October 1966 to 30 June 1967. As Elwy Yost explained at the beginning of the first episode of the second season, the title had been shortened from Passport to Adventure to Passport because Yost wanted to start including movies that were not just from the adventure genre. Taken together, both seasons can be seen as a master class in cinema.

When the film King Kong (1933) was aired, the CBC had not been shipped the reel containing the New York subway sequence, so the film was broadcast incomplete.

A comprehensive list of the movies serialized on Passport to Adventure and its sequel Passport is as follows:

- King Kong (1933)
- The Sea Hawk (1940)
- Abbott and Costello Meet Frankenstein (1948)
- The Magic Sword (1962)
- Jesse James (1939)
- The Return of Frank James (1940)
- The Invisible Man (1933)
- The Phantom of the Opera (1943)
- Here Comes Mr. Jordan (1941)
- The Adventures of Robin Hood (1938)
- The Whole Town's Talking (1935)
- Lost Horizon (1937)
- The Man Who Could Work Miracles (1936)
- Saboteur (1942)
- Mighty Joe Young (1949)
- The Wooden Horse (1950)
- They Made Me a Criminal (1939)
- Larceny, Inc. (1942)
- Union Pacific (1939)
- Between Two Worlds (1944)
- Stanley and Livingstone (1939)
- The Mark of Zorro (1941)
- My Darling Clementine (1946) - Director's Cut!
- Hollywood Cavalcade (1939)
- The Sea Wolf (1941)
- Destroyer (1943)
- Captain Blood (1935)
- The Three Musketeers (1939)
- The Prisoner of Zenda (1937)
- Destination Tokyo (1944)
- Submarine Seahawk (1958)
- Star Spangled Rhythm (1942)
- Never Say Die (1939)
- Crash Dive (1943)
- The Spanish Main (1945)
- To Be or Not To Be (1942)
- My Man Godfrey (1936)
- Shut My Big Mouth (1942)
- Earthworm Tractors (1936)
- A Slight Case of Murder (1940)
- The Golden Blade (1953)
- They Died with Their Boots On (1941)
- Man of a Thousand Faces (1957)
- I Married a Witch (1942)
- It Happened on 5th Avenue (1947)
- Elephant Boy (1937)
- Double Indemnity (1944)
- The Sky's the Limit (1943)
- Seven Keys to Baldpate (1947)
- The Miracle of Morgan's Creek (1944)
- His Girl Friday (1940)
- Virginia City (1940)
- She (1935)
- Fighter Squadron (1948)
- Dodge City (1939)
- Ruggles of Red Gap (1935)
- The Master of Ballantrae (1953)
- Against All Flags (1952)
- Adventures of Don Juan (1949)
- The Private Lives of Elizabeth and Essex (1939)
- The Last Days of Pompeii (1935)
- Springfield Rifle (1952)
- Montana (1950)
- Destry Rides Again (1939)
- Scarlet Street (1945)
- The Life and Death of Colonel Blimp (1943)
- Trail Street (1947)
- The Prince and the Pauper (1937)
- My Favorite Spy (1942)
- Gunga Din (1939)
- Callaway Went Thataway (1951)
- The Four Feathers (1939)
- The 39 Steps (1935)
- The Charge of the Light Brigade (1936)
- Prince of Pirates (1953)
- The King's Thief (1955)
- Sanders of the River (1935)
- Foreign Correspondent (1940)
- The Warriors (also known as The Dark Avenger, 1955)
- San Antonio (1945)
- Santa Fe Trail (1940)
- The Black Shield of Falworth (1954)
- Raffles (1930)
- Sons O' Guns (1936)
- Playmates (1941)
- Blood on the Moon (1948)
- Broadminded (1931)
- The White Cliffs of Dover (1944)
- The Dawn Patrol (1938)
- Rocky Mountain (1950)
- Only the Valiant (1951)
- The Great McGinty (1940)
- Gentleman Jim (1942)
- The Westerner (1940)
- Edge of Darkness (1943)
- The Outriders (1950)
- Annie Oakley (1935)
- The Postman Always Rings Twice (1946)
- The Ox-Bow Incident (1943)
- The Dude Goes West (1948)
- The Plainsman (1936)
- Northern Pursuit (1943)
- The Corsican Brothers (1941)
- Pony Express Days (1940 short)

== See also ==
- Magic Shadows, a similar series hosted by Elwy Yost
