= Fly by Night (musical) =

US stage musical

- Off-Broadway cast recording cover art
- Music: Will Connolly; Michael Mitnick; Kim Rosenstock
- Lyrics: Will Connolly; Michael Mitnick; Kim Rosenstock
- Book: Will Connolly; Michael Mitnick; Kim Rosenstock
- Productions: 2014 Off-Broadway; International Productions

Fly by Night is a stage musical written by Will Connolly, Michael Mitnick, and Kim Rosenstock, and conceived by Kim Rosenstock.
The show was first developed and presented by Yale Summer Cabaret in 2009, and had a workshop at The American Musical Theatre Project at Northwestern University in 2011.

After an out of town run at Dallas Theater Center in 2013, it opened Off-Broadway on May 16, 2014 in the Playwrights Horizons Mainstage Theater, where it ran until June 29. The production was directed by Carolyn Cantor.

The show, described as a 'darkly comic rock-fable', is set largely in 1965 New York at the time of the northeast blackout, and centres around a love triangle between a sandwich maker and two sisters.

== Plot ==
=== Act 1 ===
The Narrator introduces the story by describing the death of Cecily Smith, Mr McClam's wife and Harold's mother, on November 9, 1964 ("Fly By Night"). After the funeral, Harold and his father clean out Cecily's closet and find a record of La Traviata and a guitar. Mr McClam attempts to tell his son about why the record is important to him; however, Harold is fixated on the guitar, which Mr McClam lets him keep.

The Narrator jumps forward five months to a 'smoky club', where Harold performs a song ("Circles in the Sand") using his mother's old guitar. The Narrator cuts Harold off mid-song when he realises he has skipped a large part of the story.

The Narrator then takes the audience back in time to introduce Daphne, a young woman living in South Dakota who dreams of moving to New York and becoming an actress. Her mother agrees to let her pursue her dreams providing she takes her sister Miriam with her, and although Miriam is initially reluctant to leave her home, Daphne manages to convince her, and the two set off for New York ("Daphne Dreams"). Daphne is forced to take a job at a coat and shoe store while attending auditions, none of which are successful. One of these auditions is with the playwright Joey Storms, whose script she describes as 'worse than garbage' after being insulted by the producer.

Shortly after this audition, Daphne meets Harold, who is working as a sandwich maker at a deli run by the grumpy Crabble, and he makes her lunch. A few weeks later, he asks her out, and they kiss ("More Than Just a Friend").

The Narrator once again disrupts the chronology, taking the audience back in time to show Miriam on the night before she and Daphne leave for New York. Nervous about moving, Miriam finds comfort looking up at the stars, which she associates with her dead father ("Stars I Trust"). On Miriam's first night in New York, she has an unsettling encounter with a Romani fortune teller, which reinforces her worries about living in the city. However, she becomes more optimistic when she gets her dream job: waitressing at the Greasy Spoon Café, a 24-hour diner in Brooklyn ("Breakfast All Day").

The Narrator takes the audience forward to New Year's Day, 1965, when the playwright Joey Storms enters Daphne's store and declares her his muse ("What You Do To Me"). He begs her to star in his new show, entitled 'The Human Condition'. Daphne is ecstatic and goes to the deli to tell Harold her news. He proposes to her and she says yes ("More Than Just a Friend (Reprise)"), and decides that Harold and Miriam should meet.

That night, Miriam gets lost on her way to the diner and runs into the fortune teller again ("The Prophecy"). They say that Miriam will meet her soulmate that night, and tell her of three signs: the question "What does it look like when time stops?"; the numbers five, two, and seven; and a mysterious melody. Miriam goes to the diner and sees that the only person there is Harold. The two hit it off and Miriam sings the fortune teller's melody for Harold, who realises it is the perfect fit for the song he has been writing. Miriam is amazed by this and tells Harold everything about the prophecy, announcing "You're my soulmate, I think". When Daphne enters and introduces Harold to Miriam as her fiancé, Miriam is mortified.

The fortune teller later finds Miriam and warns her that there is a second part to the prophecy: she will have a love affair with her soulmate, and then she will have a great fall ("The Prophecy Part 2").

Although Miriam vows to avoid Harold, he can't stop thinking about her. He writes a song for her and performs it at the 'smoky club' The Narrator showed the audience earlier, tricking Miriam into attending by telling her that the wedding band Daphne asked her to book is playing there that night. This time, The Narrator allows the scene to complete and Harold finishes his song ("Circles in the Sand (Reprise)"). Afterwards, he finds Miriam in the crowd, and they kiss.

=== Act 2 ===
Miriam is filled with guilt over kissing her sister's fiancé and flees to South Dakota ("Pulled Apart"). With Miriam gone, Harold falls into a state of depression. He and Daphne move in together, however they rarely see each other as she spends so much time rehearsing with Joey. Mr McClam calls his son repeatedly, however Harold can't bring himself to answer the phone. At work, Harold and Crabble complain about the state of their lives ("Eternity").

The opening night of Joey's play is set for November 9, 1965. On 'Opening Eve', he presents Daphne with a new song ("I Need More") which references her acting dreams and her strained relationship with Harold. That night, both Daphne and Harold dream of escaping their empty lives ("The Rut").

The next morning, Harold's alarm clock breaks and he sees it as a sign: "this is what it looks like when time stops!". He books a train ticket to South Dakota to find Miriam. As he waits for his train, The Narrator talks us through the activities of the other characters: Mr McClam wants to mark the anniversary of his wife's death by seeing La Traviata, but the show is sold out; Daphne and Joey prepare for opening night; and Crabble, alone at the deli, tries to make as many sandwiches as possible ("At Least I'll Know I Tried").

Harold is about to board his train when he spots Miriam, who has returned to New York to see Daphne's play. She explains why she can't be with him, but he convinces her to have one lunch with him ("Me With You"). This lunch lasts for hours, and as they are about to part ways, the northeast blackout hits and the lights go out.

Mr McClam, who was about to take his own life by dropping his record player into his bath, believes that his wife sent the blackout to save him. He goes outside and tells a small crowd of neighbours the story of how he met his wife, and the significance of La Traviata ("Cecily Smith").

Meanwhile, the blackout - which struck just as the curtain was about to rise on the play - causes Joey to have an epiphany, and he decides he needs to leave New York. He asks Daphne to come with him, but she refuses as living in New York is her dream.

Harold and Miriam, caught up in the romance of the blackout, decide to run away; however, Miriam looks up at a clock and sees that the time stopped at 5:27. She stops in her tracks, remembering the prophecy, and is hit by a speeding car. At the hospital, Daphne and Harold learn that she has died ("Fly By Night (Reprise)").

Grief-stricken, Harold spends hours wandering around the dark city, eventually finding himself on his childhood stoop, where he is comforted by his father. He goes to his apartment, where Daphne sings 'Stars I Trust' on the roof. Together, they look at the sky and mourn Miriam ("November Stars").

== Musical numbers ==
As per the program and soundtrack:

Act 1

- "Fly By Night" – Narrator and chorus
- "Circles in the Sand" – Harold and chorus
- "Daphne Dreams" – Daphne, Miriam, Narrator, Harold, Narrator/Producer, Joey
- "More Than Just a Friend" – Harold and Daphne
- "Stars I Trust" – Miriam
- "Breakfast All Day" – Miriam and chorus
- "What You Do to Me" – Joey and Daphne
- "More Than Just a Friend (Reprise)" † – Harold and Daphne
- "The Prophecy" – Narrator/Gypsy, Miriam, chorus
- "The Prophecy (Reprise)" † – Miriam
- "The Prophecy Part 2" – Narrator/Gypsy and Miriam
- "Circles in the Sand (Reprise)" † – Harold

Act 2

- "Pulled Apart" – Miriam
- "Eternity" – Harold and Crabble
- "I Need More" – Daphne
- "The Rut" - Daphne
- "At Least I'll Know I Tried" – Whole cast
- "Me With You" – Harold and Miriam
- "Cecily Smith" – Mr McClam
- "Fly By Night (Reprise)" † – Narrator
- "November Stars" – Instrumental/choral

† Does not appear on soundtrack album

== Roles and original cast ==
=== Cast ===
Character	Original Off-Broadway Production (2014)
Narrator	Henry Stram
Harold McClam	Adam Chanler-Berat
Mr. McClam	Peter Friedman
Daphne	Patti Murin
Miriam	Allison Case
Crabble	Michael McCormick
Joey Storms	Bryce Ryness

=== Characters ===
- The Narrator – The Narrator guides the audience through the story, while also portraying several minor characters such as the fortune teller and the producer.
- Harold McClam – A sandwich maker and aspiring musician who is caught between the sisters Daphne and Miriam.
- Mr McClam - Harold's father. He spends much of the musical mourning his wife, Cecily Smith.
- Daphne – An aspiring actress who moves from South Dakota to New York in the hopes of achieving her dreams. She is engaged to Harold, although their relationship is unhappy.
- Miriam – Daphne's sister. She reluctantly follows Daphne to New York and becomes a waitress in a 24-hour diner. She believes Harold to be her soulmate.
- Crabble – Harold's co-worker, a grumpy sandwich maker who was once an air-traffic controller.
- Joey Storms – A troubled playwright, he is inspired by Daphne's harsh criticism and casts her in his new play, 'The Human Condition', which he wrote with her in mind.
- Cecily Smith – Mr McClam's deceased wife. They met when she was nineteen years old and the two of them attended La Traviata together.

== Awards and honours ==
=== 2014 Off-Broadway Run ===
Year	Award Ceremony	Category	Nominee	Result
2015	Drama Desk	Outstanding Musical		Nominated
2015	Drama Desk	Outstanding Featured Actor in a Musical	Peter Friedman	Nominated
2015	Drama Desk	Best Director of a Musical	Carolyn Cantor	Nominated
2015	Drama Desk	Best Book of a Musical	Kim Rosenstock, Will Connolly, and Michael Mitnick	Nominated

== Recording ==
The original Off-Broadway cast recording was released in 2015 under the Yellow Sound Label. The album was produced by Michael Croiter.

In addition to the songs from the live show, the album includes a cover of the song "Cecily Smith" by writer Will Connolly as a bonus track.

== Reception ==
TheaterMania described Fly by Night's script as "a perfect balance of serious and self-deprecatingly funny" and praised its "beautifully melodic score and... absolutely heartwarming story".

Ben Brantley of The New York Times wrote, "The score makes extensive use of time-freezing vamps and riffs that flirt with early rock 'n' roll, as well as recurrent motifs that are guaranteed to take up longtime residence in your ear" and described the song 'Eternity' as "a perfectly self-contained tour de force". He did, however, criticise the show's "sense of stasis" and "tendency to repeat itself, both thematically and musically", as well as its length: "at 80 or 90 minutes, instead of two and a half hours, 'Fly by Night' would have been just the ticket for audiences with a taste for sentimental quirkiness set to music".

Reviewers generally praised the show's direction, set design, and lighting. TheaterMania said, "this is not a script that moves in a perfectly chronological fashion, but thanks to Cantor's very clear direction, the time and place are never lost. Lighting designer Jeff Croiter rises to the unique challenge of lighting a blackout with an audience-enveloping design that is truly beautiful." David Cote of Time Out wrote, "the show is lent coherence and weight by director Carolyn Cantor and set designer David Korins, who ground the repetitive whimsy in effective stage pictures and fluid transitions".

The cast members' performances were similarly well received. The New York Times review said, "the first-rate cast gleams with professional polish, while specializing in a mannered deadpan hysteria, and nobody oversells the cute eccentricity". Similarly, Time Out described the cast as "brimful of talent", and the TheaterMania review said, "Stram won me over, making his lines feel unforced and spontaneous. Murin is hilarious, as are Chanler-Berat and Case. Their dialogue comes trippingly on the tongue, as if saying it were second nature".

Special mention was frequently given to Peter Friedman's performance. TheaterMania said, "Friedman's touching and heartfelt interpretation left quite a large percentage of the audience in sniffles, all while the actor unflappably maintained a stoic dignity that is indelibly characteristic of the World War II generation", while The New York Times said, "Mr. Friedman’s man in mourning finally gets — and nails — the exultant memory solo his character deserves."
