= Starbuck (film) =

2011 comedy film directed by Ken Scott

- Directed by: Ken Scott
- Written by: Martin Petit; Ken Scott
- Produced by: André Rouleau
- Starring: Patrick Huard; Antoine Bertrand; Julie Le Breton
- Cinematography: Pierre Gill
- Edited by: Yvann Thibaudeau
- Music by: David Lafleche
- Production company: Caramel Film
- Distributed by: Les Films Christal
- Release dates: 21 June 2011 (NAC premiere); 27 July 2011 (Quebec); 27 June 2012 (France)
- Running time: 108 minutes
- Country: Canada
- Language: Quebec French
- Box office: US$6.5–6.8 million

Starbuck is a 2011 French-Canadian comedy film directed by Ken Scott and co-written by Scott and Martin Petit. It was produced by André Rouleau for Caramel Film and was shot in Montreal. It stars Patrick Huard, Antoine Bertrand and Julie Le Breton. The story follows an irresponsible middle-aged man who unexpectedly faces fatherhood on two fronts: his girlfriend is pregnant, and dozens of adult children born as a result of his youthful sperm donations have filed a lawsuit to have his identity revealed.

Comedy partners Scott and Petit used the premise to explore fatherhood roles, which are the central theme of the film, with the tragicomic protagonist finding redemption through fatherhood. Critical reception to the film was mixed; some praised Huard's performance and the story which mixed comedy with heartfelt moments, while others felt that the film was overly sentimental. It was the top-grossing Canadian film of 2011, won two Genie Awards and numerous audience awards at film festivals, and appeared on best-film lists in Variety and The Globe and Mail. The film was remade in 2013 as Delivery Man and as Fonzy.

== Plot ==
David Wozniak is shown making multiple donations at a Quebec sperm bank in 1988. Twenty-three years later, in 2011, he is a hapless deliveryman for his family's butcher shop, attempting to grow cannabis in his apartment to pay an $80,000 debt to dangerous thugs. (Note: The reason for David's debt is never explained.) He hides this from his police officer girlfriend Valérie, who reveals that she is pregnant with his child and expects nothing from him. David is unsure how to meet his responsibilities and receives conflicting advice on fatherhood from his younger brother and from his best friend. David then meets a lawyer from the sperm bank and is informed that he has fathered 533 children, 142 of whom have filed a class action lawsuit to force the clinic to reveal the identity of "Starbuck", the alias David used for donations.

David's best friend represents him to keep the records sealed, and shares profiles provided of each plaintiff in the lawsuit. Curious, David seeks encounters with several of the young adults, finding moments to be supportive and in the process saving a life and having his own life saved, and determines to act as their guardian angel. One day, he accidentally follows one of them into a meeting of the plaintiffs and becomes overwhelmed in the midst of his progeny. Given the floor, he tells them that he loves them all and that while the focus has been on Starbuck, that it is remarkable that they've found each other as brothers and sisters. Recognized by several of the attendees, he identifies himself as the adoptive father of a disabled plaintiff who could not attend. Inspired by David's words, they have a weekend camping holiday in which David participates.

In the meantime, David reconciles with Valérie, taking her for an ultrasound and bringing her to dinner with his family. It is revealed that he sent his family on a vacation to Venice when his mother was terminally ill, which was secretly funded by his sperm donation fees. The press sensationally report on the class action suit as it goes to court and Starbuck is maligned in editorials. David decides to identify himself, but when the thugs assault his father he agrees with his lawyer to sue the sperm bank for damages. He wins both suits, receiving $200,000 and his identity remains secret.

David has regrets, but revealing his identity would require him to return the money and place his family in danger. However, his father buys out David's share of the family business to pay his debt, and David sends an email to the media identifying himself as Starbuck. He goes to Valérie's house and discovers that she is going into premature labour and rides with her to the hospital, where the healthy baby is born. He proposes to Valérie, tells her that he is Starbuck, and defends himself as a father. Dozens of the donor children gather to see him and their new brother, whom they shower with baby gifts.

== Cast ==
- Patrick Huard as David Wozniak ("Starbuck"). Huard was a stand-up comic before transitioning to acting. At the time of filming, Huard was a "superstar" in Quebec, having starred in four Golden Reel winning films and having directed another. Huard's father died 12 days before the film's release, resulting in his cancelling numerous promotional appearances.
  - Maxime Després as 18 year-old David
- Antoine Bertrand as David's lawyer and best friend (Note: Bertrand's character is not named in the film; his credit is given for l'ami avocat (lawyer friend).)
- Julie Le Breton as Valérie. Le Breton and Huard had previously co-starred as siblings in the 2009 comedy thriller Cadavres.
- Igor Ovadis as David's father, an immigrant from Poland.
- Dominic Philie as Frère sombre
- Marc Bélanger as Frère sympathique, Paul

Donor children:

- David Michaël as Antoine, a goth vegetarian
- Patrick Martin as Étienne, an aspiring actor
- David Giguère as a busker and the plaintiffs' spokesperson. A singer-songwriter, he performed an original song for his audition which was used in several of the character's scenes in the film.
- Sarah-Jeanne Labrosse as Julie, a retail clerk and recovering drug user
- Félix Brassard as Julien
- Alex Vallée as Ricardo
- Félix-Antoine Tremblay as Sauveteur (Marcos), a lifeguard at a public pool
- Sébastien René as Raphaël, a disabled young man. René reprised this role in the Hollywood remake of the film.

== Development and production ==
The film was co-written by Ken Scott and Martin Petit, former members of comedy troupe Les Bizarroïdes. It was their first collaboration in a decade when they began writing the film in 2009. Petit had the initial idea to tell the story of an irresponsible middle-aged man who had made numerous sperm donations for money and was the donor father to hundreds of grown children. They first set the number of donor children at 200, which seemed comedically absurd to them. However, during development, they learned of a man who had 500 donor children by artificial insemination, (Note: Sperm donation had become an issue of controversy and debate in the 2000s as registries like the Donor Sibling Registry appeared and the wave of donor children born in the 1980s and 1990s (when sperm donation had gained popularity) became adults. The growing databases revealed instances of anonymous donors who had spread rare genetic diseases. They also revealed large numbers of donor children sharing the same biological father in a single community. With donor children of similar ages, genetically predisposed to sharing the same interests, the chances of them meeting and becoming romantically involved are high, and their children would be more likely to have birth defects.) and increased their number to bring the script in line with reality.

Fathers of young children, Scott and Petit saw the absurd premise as a way to explore issues of modern fatherhood and "to look at every possible aspect of paternity." In particular, they wanted to look at delayed fatherhood and how father roles had changed in the previous fifteen years. Making David a guardian angel to the donor children allowed them to show the character acting as a father in different situations before becoming a father.

The donor children were initially written as stereotypes – the handicapped, the actor, the drug user – and were not fleshed out with names and details until later in the process. These descriptive terms are retained in the film's credits for many of these roles, along with David's brothers and lawyer. Most of the young actors cast for the donor children were relative unknowns, making their first feature film performances.

The title comes from the Canadian Holstein bull Hanoverhill Starbuck, which was prized by the Artificial Insemination Centre of Quebec (Centre d'Insémination artificielle du Québec, CIAQ) for its genetics. It sired more than 200,000 cows through artificial insemination during its 19-year life.

Starbuck was produced by André Rouleau of Montreal-based Caramel Films on a budget of $6 million. It received funding from Telefilm Canada's Canadian Feature Film Fund and from the Quebecor fund. From financing to the completion of production took two years.

Filming commenced on 15 September 2010. Most of the film was shot in the Mile End district of Montreal, a multicultural neighbourhood which informed the production design. The professional soccer scenes were filmed at Saputo Stadium with the participation of the Montreal Impact soccer club, during their 19 September 2010 match against the Tampa Bay Rowdies.

Pierre Gill served as director of photography with production design by Danielle Labrie and music by David Lafleche. Costume design was by Sharon Scott. The film was edited to 108 minutes by Yvann Thibaudeau. Dialogue is in Quebec French with subtitles in other regions and countries, including in France for certain passages.

== Themes ==
Paternity is the central theme of the film. Film critic Jay Stone wrote that Starbuck's David belongs to a new generation of fathers in film, neither an idealized role model nor a bumbling incompetent, but a character who is "both comic and tragic [as he] connects with the children he doesn't know". Meeting the donor children as adults, David must put aside preconceived expectations and accept the children for who they are. There are the talented ones (e.g.: the sports star and the actor), the cool ones (the lifeguard and the busker), and the worrying ones (the drug user, the promiscuous homosexual and the goth). As David helps to improve the lives of several of the donor children, the story reveals that David has always been giving, despite this being the cause of many of his misfortunes. This selflessness reveals a talent for being a father and David finds redemption through fatherhood.

While most of the film focuses on ties between David and the donor children, David is surrounded by other fathers: his own, his best friend, and his brothers who both have children. Scenes between David and his father discuss the importance of being present in the lives of one's children, and the perspective of fatherhood improves David's relationship with his father.

Sociologist Margaret Nelson found that, like other popular North American films involving assisted reproductive technologies, (Note: The Hollywood sperm-donor movies referenced by Nelson are Made in America (1993), The Switch, The Back-up Plan, and The Kids Are All Right (all 2010).) Starbuck reinforces the nuclear family. David's numerous genetic children are shown throughout the film to be isolated from other family relationships: no birth mothers, adoptive fathers, or other siblings are shown or referenced. The genetic tie between David and the donor children is shown as an irresistible bond, reaching a climax in the extended group hug after David announces that a new "brother" has joined their family. However, Nelson found that the conclusion places David's heart with Valérie and their new son, while the donor children are reduced to a battalion of babysitters. (Note: The film closes with the busker performing a song in a subway station corridor, surrounded by the other donor children. It is notably the film's only scene in which David is absent.) Nonetheless, film critic Roger Moore found Starbuck to be "a most rewarding reinvention of what family can mean."

== Release ==
Starbuck was distributed by Les Films Christal in Quebec and by its parent company Entertainment One in English Canada. The film had its world premiere on 21 June 2011 at the National Arts Centre in Ottawa, hosted by the heritage minister James Moore. The film opened across the province of Quebec on 27 July. The film had a gala presentation at Roy Thompson Hall on 14 September as part of the 2011 Toronto International Film Festival (TIFF). It then had a limited release in English Canada on 23 September (with subtitles).

In February 2012, Telefilm Canada announced that Starbuck had been sold in 101 countries, making it among their best international performers. Rouleau gave credit for much of the international sales to a press and industry screening of Starbuck at TIFF, where there was enough excitement to generate sales for major markets including bidding wars for France and Spain. Further sales occurred at the Berlin International Film Festival.

Starbuck opened in France on 27 June 2012, with a wide release of 190 screens. (Note: The French release benefited from good promotion and word-of-mouth, the success of La grande séduction (Scott's previous screenplay), press releases regarding the Hollywood remake, the provoking premise and generally positive reviews.) After attracting 100,000 admissions in its first week, attendance unusually held steady at 25,000 to 30,000 admissions per week for the following six weeks. On French cinema website AlloCiné, the film ranked as users' second-favourite movie of the summer, behind The Dark Knight Rises.

Starbuck was shown as part of the Canada Front showcase by Telefilm Canada in association with the Museum of Modern Art (MoMA) as its New York City premiere in March 2012. Following appearances on the film festival circuit, Starbuck had a limited US release in New York City and Los Angeles on 22 March 2013.

The film was released in China on 12 April 2013 on more than 2,000 screens.

The film was released on DVD and Blu-ray in Canada the week of 26 November 2011.

== Reception ==
=== Box office ===
Starbuck earned $3,399,338 at the Quebec box office with a total Canadian gross of over $3.5 million. The French box office was estimated at $5 million. The worldwide gross was reported as US$6,509,940 by Box Office Mojo and US$6,824,619 by The Numbers.

=== Critical response ===
On review aggregator Rotten Tomatoes, the film holds an approval rating of 65% based on 71 reviews, with an average rating of 6/10. On Metacritic, the film has a weighted average score of 49 out of 100, based on 23 critics, indicating "mixed or average reviews". On Allociné, the film has an average rating of 3.4 out of 5 based on 19 reviews in the French press. In the International Film Guide, Tom McSorley called it "one of the most engaging films of the year". Peter Debruge, chief film critic for Variety, called Starbuck "an infectiously appealing Canadian farce" and included it on his list of the ten best films of the first half of 2013. In 2023, Barry Hertz of The Globe and Mail named the film among the 23 best Canadian comedy films ever made.

Many critics complimented the writing and direction. Dave McGinn of The Globe and Mail wrote that Scott "deftly balances" the comedy and drama. McGinn and National Post chief film critic Chris Knight agreed that the expressive writing was so genuine as to lend credulity to the more outlandish scenes. Bruce DeMara of the Toronto Star wrote that it was full of surprises, alternating between laughs and tenderness, and always intelligent. Bruce Kirkland, of the Toronto Sun called it a "perfect balance [of] crazy comedy and heart-wrenching drama." However, Charlotte O'Sullivan of the London Evening Standard wrote that it lacked momentum and a cohesive tone and Radheyan Simonpillai of Now found the film to be devoid of substance, logic or realism, with an uninspired resolution.

An extended group hug in the maternity ward has been called the film's most "syrupy" moment.

Several critics commented on the emotional tone of the film. Tribute called it "one of the most heartwarming films you could ever see." Maxime Demers of Le Journal de Montréal wrote that the film "touche en plein coeur, en abordant avec délicatesse et originalité" (English: touches the heart, with delicacy and originality). DeMara called it "sweet and poignant". Hertz wrote that it was "as potent as these kind of amiable comedies come", full of sincerity. Rose Pacatte of the National Catholic Reporter called the film "extremely funny [and] heartwarming". A review in The Hollywood Reporter noted that the Caramel Films production was not overly sweet. Kirkland wrote that "the emotional depth is legitimate [and] not overly sentimental". However, also writing for the Sun, Liz Braun called the film "somewhat dopey" and falsely sweet. John Anderson of Variety and Matthew Taylor of Sight and Sound felt that the film suffered from moments of excessively sentimentality. Stephen Holden of The New York Times found the film to be "shamelessly sentimental". A review in Le Temps also found it to be overly sentimental, linking this to "la maladresse et les grands sentiments inhérents au cinéma québécois" (English: the strong yet awkward emotionality typical of Quebec cinema). Film critic Roger Moore wrote that the key moment of the film is the meeting of the plaintiffs, where David's overwhelmed emotions resolve into pride. At this point, he wrote, the audience either accepts or rejects the film's tone and all that follows.

Huard's performance was praised by Anderson, Hertz, Knight and Taylor. Stephen Cole of the Globe and Mail wrote that the film succeeded on the performance of the comedian "who can flip, flop and fly off a diving board while maintaining his sex appeal." Steven Boone of RogerEbert.com recommended the film based on Huard's performance, writing that his "warmth and passionate concern ... sell this movie's humanist spirit". Bertrand's performance was also praised. Taylor stated that Bertrand delivered the film's funniest moment in a post-trial scene on the courthouse steps. Carole Milleliri of Critikat wrote that Bertrand's performance was a complimentary blend of Seth Rogen and Jonah Hill while Moore compared Bertrand to Oliver Platt.

Some of the movie's promotional material referenced the works of filmmaker Judd Apatow, a comparison which was validated by critics Boone and Milleliri. Demers and Kelly compared the writing to Scott's previous screenplay for Seducing Doctor Lewis, which also blended comedy and drama. Peter Bradshaw stated in his review in The Guardian a belief that Starbuck was based on the same true story as the 2010 documentary Donor Unknown and faulted it for losing "almost all the charm of the real story". Debruge compared the film's comedic tone to that of My Big Fat Greek Wedding. Taylor compared David's "guardian angel" mission to the premise of My Name is Earl, in which the title character tries to redeem himself by performing good deeds for those he previously wronged.

=== Awards and nominations ===
Starbuck was nominated for six Genie Awards and seven Jutra Awards, winning the Genies for Best Original Screenplay and Best Original Song ("Quelque part" by Carole Facal). Additionally, it was recognized with three awards for being the Canadian film with the largest box office revenue of 2011 in Canada (Golden Reel Award), (Note: The Golden Reel is called the Bobine d'Or in some French-language sources.) in Quebec (Billet d'Or) and in Canada for a French-language film (Guichet d'Or).

At international film festivals, Starbuck won best film awards at Palm Springs, Seattle and Sonoma, and audience awards at Calgary, Florida, Santa Barbara, Sonoma, Traverse City, and Vancouver. The film won a Special Jury Prize at the L'Alpe d'Huez Comedy Film Festival (France). Huard won for Best Actor at L'Alpe d'Huez and at the Valladolid International Film Festival (Spain). The film was named Best North American Independent Film at the Tallinn Black Nights Film Festival (Estonia). It was a runner-up for the People's Choice Award at TIFF and was named to the festival's Canada's Top Ten list for 2011.

| Award | Category | Recipients | Result | Ref. |
|---|---|---|---|---|
| 32nd Genie Awards | Golden Reel Award | André Rouleau | Won | |
| 32nd Genie Awards | Best Motion Picture | André Rouleau | Nominated | |
| 32nd Genie Awards | Best Original Screenplay | Ken Scott and Martin Petit | Won | |
| 32nd Genie Awards | Best Actor | Patrick Huard | Nominated | |
| 32nd Genie Awards | Best Supporting Actor | Antoine Bertrand | Nominated | |
| 32nd Genie Awards | Best Supporting Actress | Julie Lebreton | Nominated | |
| 32nd Genie Awards | Best Original Song | Carole Facal for "Quelque part" | Won | |
| 2012 Prix Jutra | Billet d'Or | André Rouleau | Won | |
| 2012 Prix Jutra | Best Film | André Rouleau | Nominated | |
| 2012 Prix Jutra | Best Direction | Ken Scott | Nominated | |
| 2012 Prix Jutra | Best Actor | Patrick Huard | Nominated | |
| 2012 Prix Jutra | Best Screenplay | Ken Scott and Martin Petit | Nominated | |
| 2012 Prix Jutra | Best Art Direction | Danielle Labrie | Nominated | |
| 2012 Prix Jutra | Best Sound | Pierre-Jules Audet, Arnaud Derimay and Bernard Gariépy Strobl | Nominated | |
| 2013 Prix Jutra | Most successful Quebec film outside Quebec | Starbuck | Finalist | |
| Telefilm Canada | Guichet d'Or (Note: The Guichet d'Or (English: Golden Wicket) is awarded by Telefilm Canada to the Canadian writer and director of the highest domestic box-office grossing Canadian French-language feature film of the previous year.) | Ken Scott and Martin Petit | Won | |
| 2011 Toronto International Film Festival (TIFF) | People's Choice Award | | Runner-up | |
| 2011 Vancouver International Film Festival (VIFF) | Most Popular Canadian Film | | Won | |
| Vancouver Film Critics Circle | Best Canadian Film | | Nominated | |
| Vancouver Film Critics Circle | Best Actor – Canadian Film | Patrick Huard | Nominated | |
| Vancouver Film Critics Circle | Best Director – Canadian Film | Ken Scott | Nominated | |
| Calgary International Film Festival | People's Choice Award | | Won | |
| L'Alpe d'Huez Film Festival | Special Jury Award | Ken Scott | Won | |
| L'Alpe d'Huez Film Festival | Best Male Performance | Patrick Huard | Won | |
| Palm Springs International Film Festival | Best Narrative Film | | Won | |
| Santa Barbara International Film Festival | Audience Choice Award | | Won | |
| Seattle International Film Festival | Best Narrative Film | Starbuck | Won | |
| Sonoma International Film Festival | Audience Award | | Won | |
| Sonoma International Film Festival | Best Narrative Feature | | Won | |
| Traverse City Film Festival | Audience Award – Best Foreign Film | Ken Scott | Won | |
| Florida Film Festival | Audience Award for Best International Feature | Starbuck | Won | |
| Tallinn Black Nights Film Festival | Best North American Independent Film | | Won | |
| Valladolid International Film Festival | Best Actor | Patrick Huard | Won | |
| Quebec Council on Tobacco and Health | Oxygen Prize | | Won | |

== Controversies ==
The comedy's treatment of its subject matter sparked controversy over anonymous sperm donation, which protects the donor but can lead to harm for the donor children. In particular, when there are large groups of donor children with the same biological father in a community, there is risk of overrepresented genetic diseases and of accidental incest. At the time, there were no legal prohibitions in North America limiting the number of children conceived through artificial insemination from a single man.

Guillaume Cochin, author of the 2007 novel Spermatofolie, and publishers Editions Jean-Claude Gawsewitch alleged plagiarism against the authors of Starbuck. The filmmakers denied this or being aware of the novel. In September 2012, the publisher's lawyer filed for copyright infringement in the French high court, claiming 3 million Euros. (Note: An absence of news coverage after August 2012 suggests that the infringement lawsuit was unsuccessful or settled through the production's insurance.)

== Remakes and legacy ==
A French remake, Fonzy, was released in France on 30 October 2013. José Garcia played the lead character.

A Hollywood remake by DreamWorks Pictures, Delivery Man, unusually retained Scott as writer and director and Rouleau as producer. Begun in 2012 on an "accelerated production schedule", it starred Vince Vaughn and was released on 22 November 2013. Variety described it as a scene-for-scene remake.

Adaptation rights were sold for a Bollywood remake in Hindi, to be dubbed into Punjabi and six other languages. Producer Ajay Virmani of Toronto-based First Take Entertainment was attached to the project. (Note: Ajay Virmani had previously produced Breakaway with Rouleau.) Some sources incorrectly identified Vicky Donor as this remake. The project was apparently abandoned. (Note: The Bollywood remake may have been abandoned due to the success of Vicky Donor. Producers Rouleau and Virmani instead turned their efforts to Dr. Cabbie, which began filming in 2013.)

The artwork The Commerce of Infertility (2013) by Andi Arnovitz was inspired by Starbuck and the events on which the film is based. It consists of 400 plastic babies with price tags, each encased in resin to resemble ice cubes, arranged in a grid. According to the artist, the piece questions the enormity of the fertility business and the need for oversight in the profitable industry.
