= Lauren Yee =

American playwright

- Born: 1985 (age 40–41)
- Education: Yale University (BA); University of California, San Diego (MFA)
- Occupation: Playwright
- Spouse: Zachary Zwillinger
- Website: laurenyee.com

Lauren Yee (Chinese: 余秀菊) is an American playwright and television writer. Her play, Cambodian Rock Band, received the 2018 Horton Foote Prize for Outstanding New American Play.

== Early life and education ==
Yee was born and raised in San Francisco, California. While in high school, she discovered a forwarded email about a 10-minute play contest with a Lunar New Year theme and wrote her first play overnight. The experience of hearing actors perform her words inspired her to found Youth for Asian Theater, a company she created with friends to write, direct, act, and put on shows for their community. She graduated from Lowell High School in 2003.

Yee graduated from Yale University in 2007, majoring in English and Theatre Arts. She then attended University of California, San Diego's MFA playwriting program and graduated in 2012.

== Career ==
Yee is a member of the Ma-Yi Writers' Lab, a Playwrights' Center Core Writer, and has worked under commission from the Goodman Theatre, Lincoln Center, and Mixed Blood. She has named "Christopher Chen, Julia Cho, Mike Lew, and so, so many others" and "graphic novelists Thi Bui and Gene Luen Yang," among others, as Asian American playwrights and writers she admires.

The Great Leap (2018), Cambodian Rock Band (2018), and Mother Russia (2026) form a cycle of plays that collide 20th-century Asian communism with Western pop culture.

In addition to plays, Yee has written for the Netflix series Mixtape.

== Personal life ==
Yee is currently based in New York City. She is married to Zachary Zwillinger, an attorney. The two met at Yale. They have two daughters.

== Plays ==
- Ching Chong Chinaman (Berkeley Impact Theatre)
- Crevice (Impact Theatre)
- The Tiger Among Us (January - February 2013, Mu Performing Arts (Minneapolis)
- The Hatmakers Wife (developed at PlayPenn New Play Conference in 2011; August 27, 2013 - September 21, 2013, Off-Broadway The Playwrights Realm)
- Samsara (February 2015 - March 8, Chicago)
- in a word (April 2015, San Francisco Playhouse)
- Hookman (May 2015, Encore Theatre Company, San Francisco)
- King of the Yees (2015, The Goodman Theatre's New Stages Festival)
- The Great Leap (2018, Off-Broadway)
- Cambodian Rock Band (2018, South Coast Repertory)
- The Song of Summer (2019, Trinity Repertory Company)
- Young Americans (2023, Portland Center Stage/Pittsburgh Public Theater)
- A Wrinkle In Time (2025, Arena Stage)
- Mother Russia (2026, Off-Broadway, Signature Theatre Company)

== Awards and honors ==
2026

- Lucille Lortel Award for Outstanding Play nomination, Mother Russia

2019

- Doris Duke Performing Artist Award
- Steinberg Playwright Award, with a cash award of $50,000.
- Harold and Mimi Steinberg/American Theatre Critics Association New Play Award for Cambodian Rock Band, which includes a $25,000 prize.
- Whiting Award in Drama
- Signature Theatre Company (New York City) Residency 5 program. The program "guarantees playwrights three premieres over five years."

2018

- Horton Foote Prize for Outstanding New American Play for Cambodian Rock Band.
- Susan Smith Blackburn Prize finalist for The Great Leap
- Princeton University MacKall Gwinn Hodder Fellows for the 2018–2019 academic year.

2017

- Joseph Kesselring Prize for The Great Leap.

2016

- Will Glickman Playwright Award winner (for in a word)
- Ashland New Plays Festival – Women's Invitational winner (for King of the Yees)
- Francesca Primus Prize from the American Theatre Critics Association

2015

- The Kilroys List Top 50 (for King of the Yees and The Tiger Among Us)
- Susan Smith Blackburn nominee (for in a word)
- The Chance Theatre playwright-in-residence
- Theatre Bay Area Award nominee – Outstanding World Premiere Play (for Hookman)

2014

- Lark Playwrights' Week playwright (for The Tiger Among Us)
- Constance Saltonstall Foundation residency Berkeley Rep Ground Floor finalist (for King of the Yees)
- Leah Ryan Prize for Emerging Women Playwrights runner-up (for The Tiger Among Us)

2013

- O'Neill Conference playwright (for Samsara)
- Sundance Theatre Lab finalist (for in a word) Playwrights' Center Core Writer (2013-2016)
- Virginia B. Toulmin Foundation grant (with the Goodman Theatre, for King of the Yees)
- Playwrights Realm Page One resident playwright
- Second Stage Theatre – Shank playwright-in-residence
- UCross Foundation residency
- L. Arnold Weissberger Award nominee (for Samsara)
- Gerbode Foundation Playwright Commissioning Award (with Encore Theatre Company)

2012

- Susan Smith Blackburn Prize nominee (for Samsara)
- Bay Area Playwrights Festival winner (for Samsara)
- Ma-Yi Writers Lab playwright (2012–present) PEN USA Literary Award for Drama finalist (for A Man, his Wife, and his Hat)
- Time Warner fellow at the Women's Project Playwrights Lab
- Bay Area Theatre Critics Circle nominee (for Crevice)
- Kitchen Dog Theatre's New Works Festival winner (for A Man, his Wife, and his Hat)
- East West Players' Face of the Future Playwriting Competition third place (for Samsara)
- Aurora Theatre Global Age Project finalist (for in a word)

2011

- PlayPenn Conference playwright (for A Man, his Wife, and his Hat)
- KCACTF's Paul Stephen Lim Playwriting Award winner (for in a word)
- KCACTF's Jean Kennedy Smith Playwriting Award winner (for in a word)
- IICAS Student Research Travel Grant recipient (for Mu Performing Arts commission)

2010

- MAP Fund grantee (with Mu Performing Arts)
- Hangar Theater Lab Company playwright-in-residence (for in a word)
- Kennedy Center American College Theater Festival Paula Vogel Award in Playwriting (for Ching Chong Chinaman)
- El Gouna Writers' Residency fellow

2009

- MacDowell Colony fellow
- Public Theater Emerging Writers Group member
- Theatre Bay Area New Works Fund commission (with AlterTheater)
- Wasserstein Prize finalist PONY Fellowship finalist
- Jerome Fellowship finalist (selected)
- American Antiquarian Society – Robert and Charlotte Baron fellow
- Hawthornden Castle International Retreat for Writers fellow
- 2008 Princess Grace Award finalist (for Ching Chong Chinaman)
- Ludwig Vogelstein Foundation grantee Dramatists Guild fellow New York Mills Arts Retreat writer-in-residence
- Edward F. Albee Foundation fellow PlayGround June Anne Baker Prize winner/commission (for Crevice)

2007

- Kumu Kahua Theatre Pacific Rim Prize winner (for Ching Chong Chinaman)
