= Working Title (film) =

1985 Canadian short film

- Directed by: Ken Scott; Fred Jones
- Written by: Ken Scott; Fred Jones
- Produced by: Gerry Quigley
- Cinematography: Fred Jones
- Edited by: Ken Scott; Fred Jones
- Production company: IDS Films
- Release date: September 1985 (Toronto)
- Running time: 14 minutes
- Country: Canada
- Language: English

Working Title is a Canadian short film, directed by Ken Scott and Fred Jones and released in 1985. The film is a satirical mockumentary about a film director who is being interviewed about the problem-plagued production of his planned magnum opus, The Merchant of Venus, by a parody of Canadian television host Elwy Yost.

The film premiered at the 1985 Toronto International Film Festival, and was later screened at Toronto Film Now, an event highlighting short films by emerging local directors, in November. Yost also aired it as an interstitial bonus, between the evening's feature films, on his TVOntario film series Saturday Night at the Movies in January 1986.

The film was a Genie Award nominee for Best Live Action Short Drama at the 7th Genie Awards in 1986.
