= Giuseppangelo Fonzi =

Italian dental surgeon and dental technician

Giuseppangelo Lucinto Fonzi
- Born: 18 July 1768; Spoltore, Abruzzo, Kingdom of Sicily
- Died: 31 August 1840 (aged 72); Barcelona (Catalonia)
- Known for: Improvement of dental prothesis
- Medical career
- Profession: Dentist
- Field: Dental technology

Giuseppangelo Lucinto Fonzi (18 July 1768, Spoltore in Abruzzo - 31 August 1840, Barcelona in Catalonia) was a Sicilian dental surgeon and dental technician known for having improved the dental prostheses.

== Biography ==
He began to study law in Orsogna, in the province of Chieti, and in 1788 he enrolled at the University of Naples. After interrupting his law studies, he boarded a Spanish warship called La Bettina where he learned Spanish, astronomy and navigation. Tired of maritime life, he left for Spain and worked at various jobs to survive. There he observed the skillful work of some tooth pullers and dentists, learned their art, which he found lucrative, and began to practice it with skill and luck. He had finally found a field of activity that he liked and devoted himself enthusiastically to it. Thus he became an itinerant dentist, working outdoors. Fascinated by this field, he decided to go to France to perfect and deepen his knowledge of dentistry. In 1795, Giuseppangelo Fonzi moved to Paris to train where Pierre Fauchard and his successors worked. Around 1795, he set up a dental practice in Paris. He received illustrious people such as Eugène de Beauharnais, son of Joséphine de Beauharnais, Napoleon's first wife.

With the Restoration, because of his pro-Napoleonic past, he was subject to police surveillance and accused of conspiracy. He therefore left France and began to travel especially as his services were requested by European monarchs. At the same time, these travels allowed him to enrich his body of knowledge. His reputation as a specialist in the aesthetic aspects of prostheses had to be asserted at every stage of his travels. In 1815 he was appointed dentist to the Bavarian King Maximilian I and received a large financial reward. In 1816 he worked in London and, on 4 September 1818 he received 80,000 "real de vellón" for services rendered to the Spanish monarch Ferdinand VII. In 1823 he was appointed "Dental Surgeon of the Russian Imperial Court". On 20 June 1825, his presence in Madrid was requested by Ferdinand VII. After several trips across Europe, he returned to Madrid where he worked as a dentist of the King's Chamber until 1835. In 1827, after another brief period in Paris, he went to Naples hoping to set up a factory for the manufacture of artificial teeth similar to the one he had just built in Paris. But the Bourbon authorities refused him the concession because of his republican past and he decided to return to the French capital. However, his business fortunes were beginning to decline and in 1835 he sold his factory to a nephew. He lived for a time in Madrid, then ill, he settled in Málaga.

Once he had recovered, he moved to Barcelona where he decided, once again, to spend his old age in his native Italy. But, surprised by another attack, he died on 31 August 1840 in Barcelona, where he had asked to be buried.

== Works ==
In the 1770s, an apothecary in Saint Germain en Laye, Alexis Duchâteau, had hippopotamus ivory prostheses made for him, following the deterioration of his own teeth. Soon, the stench of this porous and therefore unhealthy ivory bothered him and he considered making porcelain teeth. In 1774, he made armatures out of Sèvres porcelain. Duchâteau met the dentist Nicolas Dubois de Chémant to ask him for advice, but he ended up not selling his prostheses and abandoned the project. Nicolas Dubois de Chémant resumes Duchâteau's experiments alone. Dubois de Chémant published in 1788: Dissertation sur les avantages des nouvelles dents et rateliers artificiels, incorruptibles et sans odeur (Dissertation on the advantages of incorruptible and odourless artificial teeth and racks).

In 1790, he worked closely with the Royal Porcelain Manufactory of Sèvres. On 6 September 1791, he obtained a 15-year patent for the manufacture of raw paste teeth and racks. During the revolutionary period, Dubois de Chémant went into exile in London in early 1792 and settled in Soho, 2 Frith street. He obtained a patent for his "mineral paste" teeth in England: at the beginning of the 19th century, the Wedgwood company produced for Dubois de Chémant porcelain pastes for the manufacture of artificial teeth. Dubois de Chémant is at the origin of the beginnings of a small industrial production of ceramic teeth. In London, he may have had exchanges with Claudius Ash.

In 1795, Fonzi moved to Paris to practice his profession of dentistry. He was interested in rot-proof teeth with a real practical sense. He learned chemistry and began to make what he called "terro-metallic" teeth himself. He allowed aesthetic choices and, above all, the fixing of ceramic teeth with different possibilities of attachment systems on metal bases possible, while understanding the usefulness of using platinum. He also invented flexible hooks for the retention of prostheses.

The one-piece ceramic dentures of its predecessors are replaced by dentures where the teeth are baked one by one, placing a platinum pin in each of them, then inserted on a base and held in place with this hook. He mastered the problem of instability of prostheses for which the volumetric shrinkage of the ceramic paste during cooling of the piece led to complications of placement on the gums. The variable composition of his innovative ceramic paste allowed him to create systems with 28 different colours, obtained by mixing different metallic oxides.

To make the bases, Fonzi took a first wax impression of the mouth from which he made a plaster model of the toothless jaw. After taking a clay impression of this model, Fonzi then cast it in bronze. On this bronze replica he applied a platinum plate which gave the exact shape of the toothless arch. Fixation to other parts by means of enamelled elastic hooks finally gave the prosthesis a high degree of stability and a remarkable aesthetic result.

To improve comfort and prevent gums pain, Fonzi used a rubber mix spread over the base of the prosthesis, allowing for a softer interface with the underlying tissue.

In 1807, at the French Academy of Sciences, Fonzi successfully presented all its systems for the improvement and prosthetic adaptation of mineral teeth as well as techniques for the creation of metallic dental plates. This presentation significantly advanced dental prosthetics and Fonzi achieved a major success that once again exasperated some Parisian dentists, including Dubois Foucou, Napoleon's personal dentist, who challenged him in 1808. Fonzi responded with a well-documented public open letter and even offered to provide all his colleagues, including Dubois Foucou, with the new ceramic teeth they needed.

Thus, in 1808, the first offer was made by a dental technician to sell ceramic teeth to dentists and the beginnings of industrial production of prosthetic teeth were observed.

== Legacy ==
A street is named after him in Spoltore. (42°27′17″N 14°08′19″E)

== Bibliography ==
- Humanities, National Endowment for the (1939-04-30). "Evening star (Washington, D.C.) 1854-1972, April 30, 1939, Image 94". p. 10. ISSN 2331-9968.
- "Dalle Citta'e Borgate Degli Abruzzi e Molise". Marsica Nuovo (in Italian). 5 December 1922 – via Colorado Historic Newspapers Collection.
- G. Tanzer (December 1983). "History of dentistry. Giuseppangelo Fonzi, 13 July 1768-31 August 1840". Der Zahnarzt; Colloquium Med. Dent. 27 (12): 765–769. ISSN 0044-1678. PMID 6367280.
