= Fonzy =

- Film poster
- Directed by: Isabelle Doval
- Written by: Isabelle Doval; José Garcia; Martin Petit; Ken Scott; Karine de Demo
- Produced by: Odile McDonald; Alain Pancrazi
- Starring: José Garcia
- Cinematography: Gilles Henry
- Edited by: Guerric Catala
- Music by: André Manoukian
- Distributed by: StudioCanal
- Release date: 30 October 2013 (France)
- Running time: 103 minutes
- Country: France
- Language: French
- Budget: $9 million
- Box office: $3.6 million

Fonzy is a 2013 French comedy film about a fish deliveryman in Paris becomes involved in a legal battle with his sperm donation children. The film is a remake of the Quebecois film Starbuck (2011).

== Plot ==
Twenty years ago, Diego Costa, under the pseudonym "Fonzy", repeatedly donated sperm to the sperm bank. Today, at 42, he is a deliveryman in a family-owned fishmonger and leads a teenage irresponsible and blundering life. While his wife Elsa learns that she is pregnant, his past resurfaces. Diego discovers he is the father of 533 children, 142 of them want to know who is Fonzy.

== Cast ==
- José Garcia as Diego
- Audrey Fleurot as Elsa
- Lucien Jean-Baptiste as Quentin
- Gérard Hernandez as Ramon
- Arnaud Tsamere as Maître Chasseigne
- Alice Belaïdi as Sybille
- François Civil as Hugo
- Alison Wheeler as Alix
- Pablo Pauly as Pablo
