= Magic Shadows =

Canadian television series

Magic Shadows was a thirty-minutes Canadian television series produced by the TVOntario public television network hosted by Elwy Yost that ran on weekday evenings from 1974 to the mid 1980s.

The format was that the host would present classic feature films in a serialized format over the week from Monday to Friday. In addition, Yost presented material related to the film in question such as interviews, and visits to interesting places in Ontario that related to the featured film.

When the main film was concluded early, the Friday night airing would present classic film serials including acclaimed productions from Republic Studios such as The Adventures of Captain Marvel, Mysterious Doctor Satan, Daredevils of the Red Circle and Captain America.

The Magic Shadows theme song was composed by musician Harry Forbes.
