= Dave Patten =

American musician

- Born: March 12, 1988 (age 38); Philadelphia, Pennsylvania, United States
- Occupations: Actor, musician

David Clark Patten (born March 12, 1988) is an American musician, actor, director, and author from Philadelphia.

== Early life and education ==
Patten attended Temple University in Philadelphia, graduating with a degree in film in 2010. While at university, he collaborated with rapper Meek Mill on tracks "Believe Me" and "How Good", also directing some of Mill's music videos. This led Patten to sign with Creative Artists Agency, and subsequently with Meek Mill's record label DreamChasers Records in 2012.

== Career ==
Patten has been signed to Clark Records since 2009, releasing nine studio albums and one live album. Patten has toured America and Canada, currently represented by Neon Entertainment.

He played the role of Adam in the DreamWorks film Delivery Man (2013). In 2015, he played the role of Jay Miller in the dark comedy "Escorts".

== Discography ==
Title	Album details
Too Close, Too Far	Released: February 9, 2006; Label: Clark Records
Fly Away	Released: November 27, 2007; Label: Clark Records
Pace of Change	Released: March 25, 2008; Label: Clark Records
No Direction	Released: January 13, 2009; Label: Clark Records
Boomerang	Released: January 1, 2010; Label: Clark Records
Exposure	Released: December 7, 2010; Label: Clark Records
Gone	Released: February 28, 2012; Label: Clark Records
On This Ledge	Released: October 1, 2013; Label: Clark Records
Live in Philadelphia	Released: June 3, 2014; Label: Clark Records
Heavy Mind	Released: February 24, 2015; Label: Clark Records
Live at the Ardmore Music Hall	Released: July 27, 2016; Label: Clark Records
Badlands	Released: October 11, 2016; Label: Clark Records
