= Fozzy (disambiguation) =

Fozzy is an American heavy metal group.

It may also refer to:

- Fozzy, nickname for Craig Foster, Australian football commentator and human rights advocate
- Fozzy (album), album by the band Fozzy
- Fozzy Group, Ukrainian group of retail companies
- Fozzy Whittaker, American football player

== See also ==
- Fozzie Bear, a Muppet character
