= Martin Petit =

Canadian comedian and actor (born 1968)

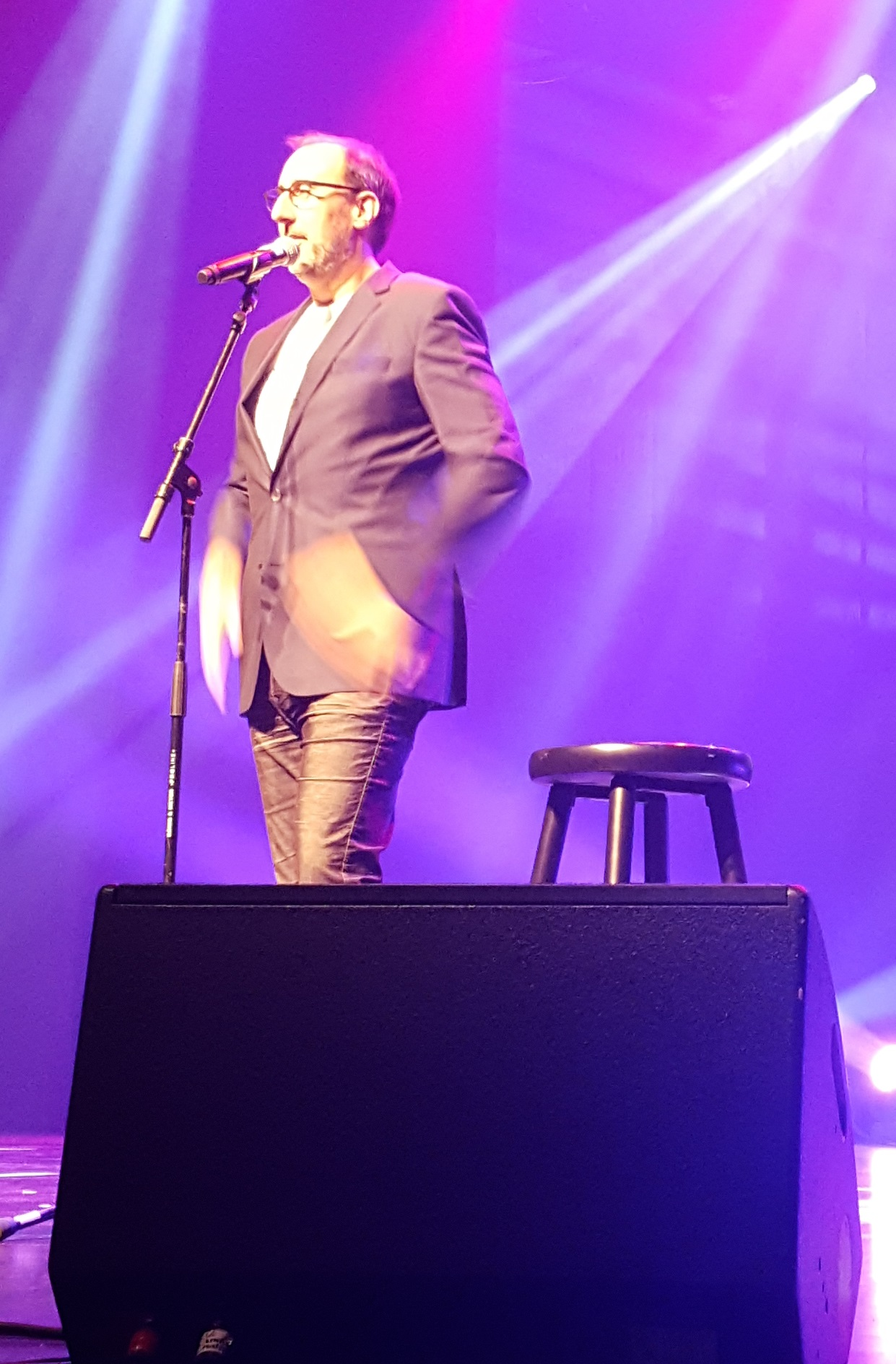
- Martin Petit photographed in Laval, Quebec, Canada at the Salle André-Mathieu.
- Born: September 24, 1968 (age 56); Laval, Quebec, Canada
- Occupation(s): actor, comedian, screenwriter
- Known for: Stand-up specials, comedy gala host, creator and star in Les Pêcheurs sit-com, The Bizarroides; Starbuck; Delivery Man

Martin Petit (born September 24, 1968 in Laval, Quebec, Canada) is a Canadian comedian and actor. Creator and star of the Sit-com Les Pêcheurs (2012-2017) on Ici Radio-Canada. Known for his one-man shows, Grandeur Nature, Humour libre, Martin Petit et le micro de feu, all of them won best comedy show at Les Olivier comedy award in Montreal. He is a former member of The Bizarroides. He won a Genie Award for Best Screenplay, for Starbuck. He co-wrote the American Remake of Starbuck with director Ken Scott.
