= Ken Scott (filmmaker) =

Canadian screenwriter, director, actor and comedian

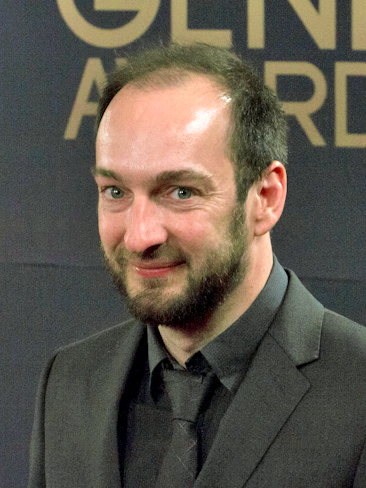
- Scott at the 2012 Genie Awards
- Born: 1970 (age 55–56); Dalhousie, NB, Canada
- Occupations: Screenwriter, actor, director, comedian

Ken Scott (born in 1970 in Dalhousie, New Brunswick) is a Canadian screenwriter, actor, director, and comedian. He is best known as a member of the comedy group Les Bizarroïdes with Martin Petit, Stéphane E. Roy and Guy Lévesque, and as screenwriter of the films Seducing Doctor Lewis, The Little Book of Revenge (Guide de la petite vengeance), and Starbuck, as well as television series Le Plateau.

== Life and career ==
Scott was raised in Laval, Quebec, and gained a degree in cinematography at the Université du Québec à Montréal in 1991. While in film school, he and classmate Fred Jones collaborated on three short films; the most noted of these, Working Title, was a Genie Award nominee for Best Live Action Short Drama at the 7th Genie Awards in 1986. The other two short films, Gibbons: Canada's Fighting Elite and Reel to Reel, were less widely screened.

His first widely seen work was a series of commercials for cheese made between 1995 and 1998. In 2000, he played the theatrical role of Monsieur Pearson in the play Propagande, written by Stéphane E. Roy. In 2002, he wrote episodes for the television series Le Plateau, in which he also played the role of François Chamberland.

In 2008, Scott produced his first feature film, Sticky Fingers, which he also wrote. It has been announced he will direct the film adaption of the Stephen King novel From a Buick 8.

== Filmography ==
| Year | Title | Credited as | | Notes |
| Year | Title | Director | Writer | Notes |
|---|---|---|---|---|
| 1985 | Working Title | Yes | Yes | Short film; with Fred Jones |
| 2000 | Life After Love (La vie après l'amour) | No | Yes | |
| 2003 | Seducing Doctor Lewis (La Grande Séduction) | No | Yes | |
| 2009 | Sticky Fingers (Les Doigts croches) | Yes | Yes | |
| 2011 | Starbuck | Yes | Yes | |
| 2013 | Delivery Man | Yes | Yes | |
| 2015 | Unfinished Business | Yes | No | |
| 2018 | The Extraordinary Journey of the Fakir (L'Extraordinaire Voyage du Fakir) | Yes | No | |
| 2021 | Goodbye Happiness (Au revoir le bonheur) | Yes | Yes | |
| 2025 | Once Upon My Mother (Ma mère, Dieu et Sylvie Vartan) | Yes | Yes | |

== Awards ==
Scott won the Audience Award at the 2004 Sundance Film Festival for Seducing Doctor Lewis. He has been nominated for the Quebec film industry's Prix Jutra and the national Genie Awards four times each; at both ceremonies, Scott and Petit won the 2012 awards for Best Original Screenplay for Starbuck.
