= Pastoral science fiction =

Science fiction subgenre

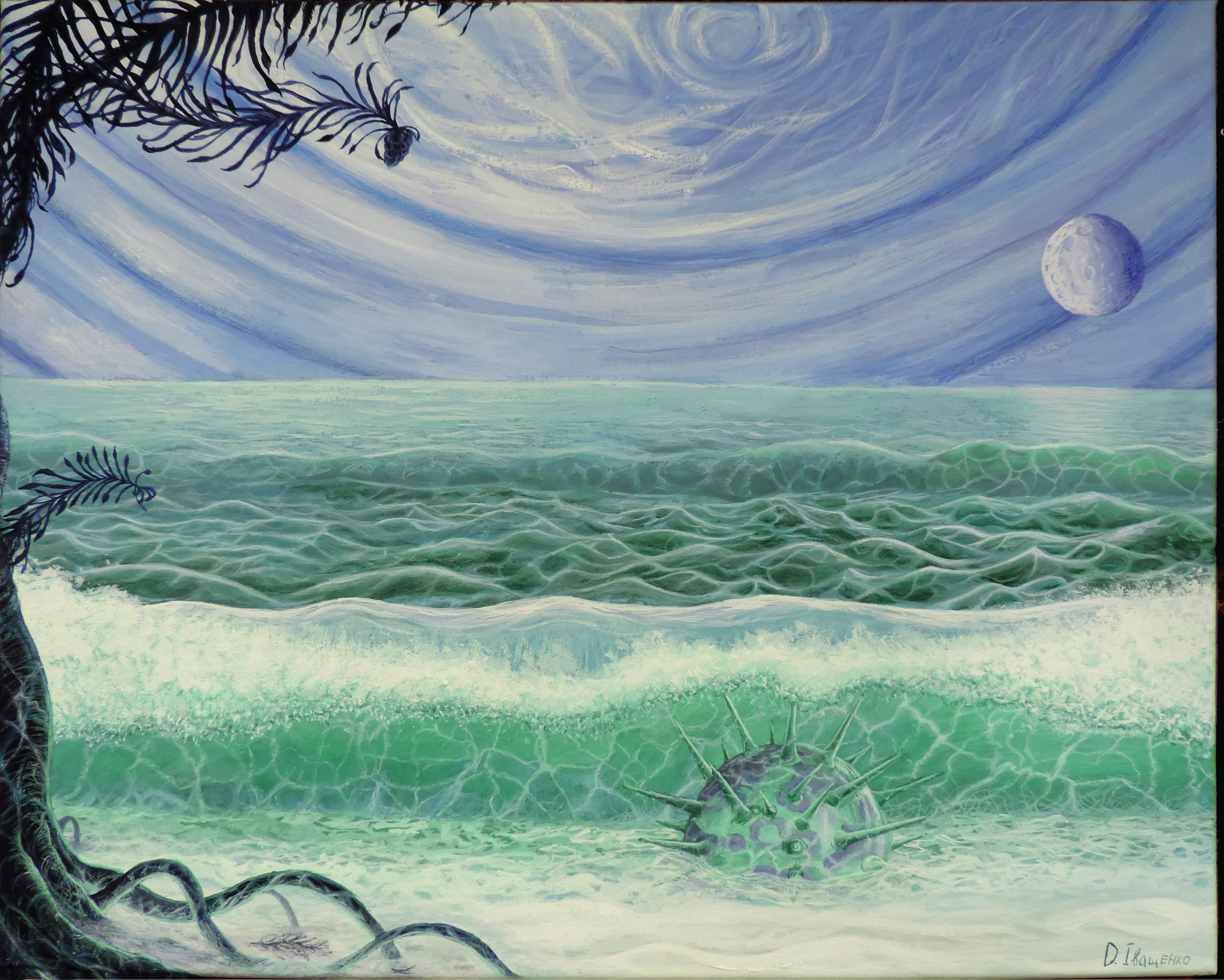
A gouache painting depicting an imaginary scene on a watery moon of a ringed exoplanet

Pastoral science fiction is a subgenre of science fiction which uses bucolic, rural settings, like other forms of pastoral literature. Since it is a subgenre of science fiction, authors may set stories either on Earth or another habitable planet or moon, sometimes including a terraformed planet or moon. Unlike most genres of science fiction, pastoral science fiction works downplay the role of futuristic technologies. The pioneer is author Clifford Simak (1904–1988), a science fiction Grand Master whose output included stories written in the 1950s and 1960s about rural people who have contact with extraterrestrial beings who hide their alien identity.

Pastoral science fiction stories typically show a reverence for the land, its life-giving food harvests, the cycle of the seasons, and the role of the community. While fertile agrarian environments on Earth or Earth-like planets are common settings, some works may be set on ocean or desert planets or habitable moons. The rural dwellers, such as farmers and small-townspeople, are depicted sympathetically, albeit with the tendency to portray them as conservative and suspicious of change. The simple, peaceful rural life is often contrasted with the negative aspects of noisy, dirty, fast-paced cities. Some works take a Luddite tone, criticizing mechanization and industrialization and showing the ills of urbanization and over-reliance on advanced technologies.

== Terminology ==
The subgenre is also called "rural science fiction" (RSF) in some 2020s sources. Kirkus Reviews has noted the subgenre of "small-town science fiction" set in the countryside, which takes inspiration from Ray Bradbury's stories about bucolic towns. Simon Reynolds has applied this subgenre to film, stating that Super 8 is a "small town science fiction movie".

== Theory ==
American historian and literary critic Leo Marx's book The Machine in the Garden: Technology and the Pastoral Idea (1964) sets out the theoretical underpinnings of modern pastoral literature. He states that the pastoral setting has a "dynamic relationship with [t]echnology", which transforms the pastoral ideal of an idyllic paradise into "commodified nostalgia" about a "middle landscape" (which is in between the small farms that are still within the town gates and the wilderness that lies beyond) where lives can be "lived in harmony, momentarily unburdened by history." This sentimental version of the American pastoral uses rural landscapes and sublimation to create a sense of nostalgia and an "illusion of peace and harmony in a green pasture."

Tom Shippey contrasts between the pastoral genre, which focuses on "rural, nostalgic, [and] conservative" communities, and genres focused on societies that use technologies to create new tools and devices. For example, in mainstream science fiction, there is often an emphasis on the role of advanced technologies (spaceships, robots, computers, etc.) and their impact on people and society. Shippey states that these literatures about innovation and technology-oriented "fabril" societies depict these cultures as "overwhelmingly urban, disruptive, future-oriented, eager for novelty,"' and "centred on the image of the 'faber'" (craftsman, from a root meaning "fashioning" or "fitting") which historically referred to a blacksmith, but in a science fiction context, it refers to creators, designers, and builders of new artefacts and devices. These could be new spaceships, laser weapons, artificial intelligence or other technology, which Darko Suvin collectively refers to as the "novum" element of science fiction.

Andy Sawyer argues that the pastoral genre in science fiction depends on the "tension between these two modes", in which pastoral science fiction (SF) focuses on "anxiety about the future", whereas stories about urban faber society tend to enthusiastic about the future and the changes it will bring. Leo Marx gives an example of the busy, noisy urban life disrupting the peaceful rural realm with his recounting of Nathaniel Hawthorne working in the woods in the countryside when the quiet was shattered with the shrieking of a train locomotive whistle, showing "technology's intrusion into the pastoral landscape."

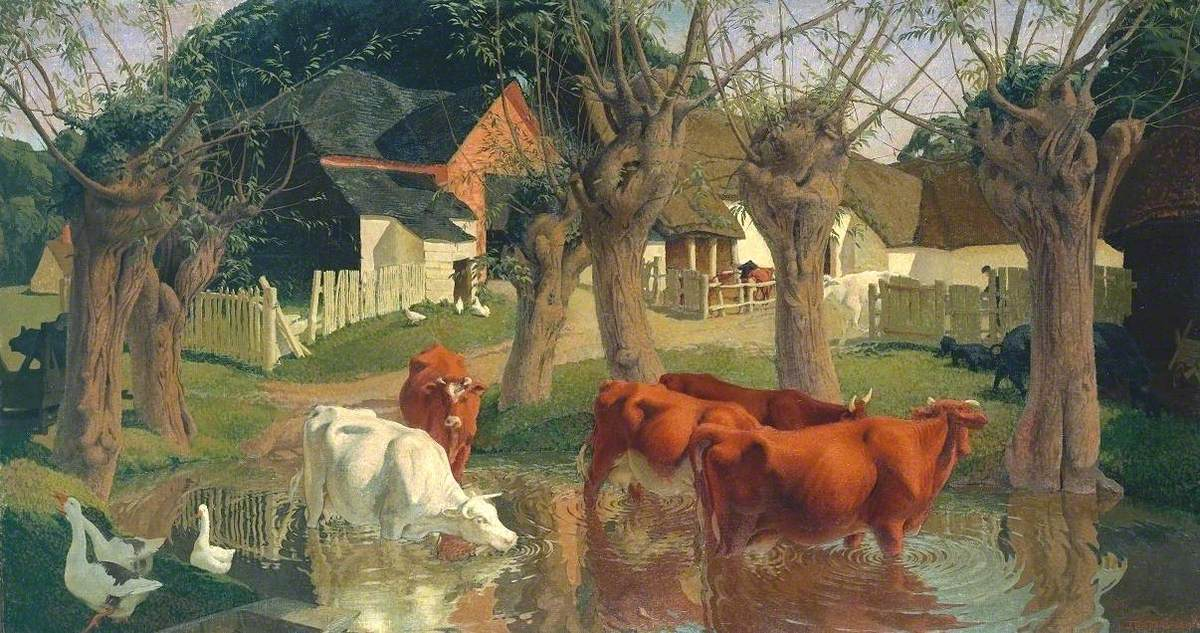
James Bateman's (1814–1849) painting "Pastoral" depicts a nineteenth century farm setting.

Pastoral stories have a nostalgic and sentimental focus on tradition, in contrast to "faber cultures which are obsessed with developing innovations. Darko Suvin states that due to "cognitive estrangement", the pastoral genre is closer to science fiction than it is to fantasy. Pastoral symbols and myths are at the roots of American cultural narratives. Along with apocalyptic and urban strands, pastoral symbols are "mutually interpenetrating elements" in American Protestant culture and part of the values of the Enlightenment. The pastoral opposition between the country and the city may be recreated by comparing Earth to a technologically advanced alien planet.

Sawyer uses English literary critic and poet William Empson's 1950 argument that the pastoral genre "compress[es] complex meaning into emblematic ecological images" of "wilderness, garden and farm" that serve as "metaphor, a poetic idea" showing the impact of technology on how we relate to nature. Pastoral stories typically focus on communities and regular people's life events, such as falling in love, marriage, birth, and death, and on processes that are key to sustaining rural communities, such as harvesting food. As well, pastoral stories often use the changing seasons as an organizing framework and as metaphor for natural cycles (e.g., Brian Aldiss' Helliconia Spring). Sawyer argues that some pastoral utopias have a dark side, in that the idyllic setting for the few settlers or colonists was achieved at the expense of the land being turned into a dystopia for the Indigenous inhabitants who were displaced or used as slaves to clear the land.

== Antecedents ==
One of the antecedents of pastoral science fiction works was nineteenth century rural utopian pastorals which depicted an idyllic Arcadia. Most utopian writers placed a strong emphasis on technological progress as a way to a better future; examples range from Edward Bellamy's Looking Backward (1888) to King Gillette's The Human Drift (1894) to Alexander Craig's Ionia (1898) to H. G. Wells's A Modern Utopia (1905). However, a minority of nineteenth century utopian writers reacted with a skepticism toward, or even a rejection of, technological progress, and favored a return to a rural, agrarian simplicity.

These "pastoral utopias" include William Morris's News from Nowhere (1891), about a future common ownership society based on agrarian production in small communities where people take pleasure in nature; the "Altrurian trilogy" by William Dean Howells, including A Traveler from Altruria (1894), about a faraway island of Altruria where all resources are shared and craftspeople work slowly on their work, as there is no capitalist pressure (and well as its sequels), and W.H. Hudson's A Crystal Age, a pastoral utopia where people have no machines and only simple devices; they plow their fields with horses and use axes to chop down trees. News from Nowhere is both from the pastoral genre and it is soft science fiction, since the premise of the story is time travel to a utopian future. Canadian science fiction author Frederick Philip Grove's novels The Master of the Mill (1944) and Consider Her Ways (1947) blend pastoral science fiction with naturalism and utopian themes.

== Hidden aliens in a rural area ==
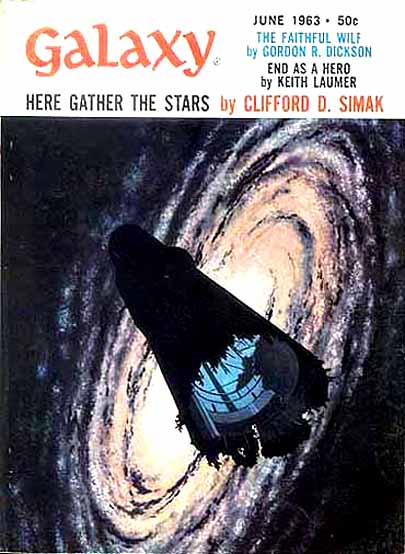
Way Station was serialized in Galaxy Science Fiction in 1963 as Here Gather the Stars.

One challenge with writing pastoral science fiction is that if the advanced, futuristic technologies are too prominent, their presence may undercut the bucolic rural setting. One solution is to set the story in an isolated rural area, and have aliens with advanced technologies (interstellar travel, spaceships, etc.) land in the region, but keep their advanced technologies hidden from all or almost all people. Sam Jordison states that Simak "pioneered 'pastoral science-fiction'" with Way Station (1963) and earlier stories by creating scenarios in which aliens land in the isolated woods. In Way Station, a Civil War veteran living in a rural farmhouse strikes a deal with aliens soon after the war. In return for letting the aliens convert his house into a hidden "way station" for aliens traveling between galaxies, the aliens give him immortality, so that he is still alive in the 1960s (and appears like a young man). Two other pastoral examples from Simak with "hidden aliens" include "Neighbor" (June 1954 issue of Astounding Science Fiction), which is about a new immigrant to an isolated rural region who arrives with an automated tractor powered by a mysterious advanced technology and the ability to cure illnesses beyond what current medicine can treat (the townsfolk do not realize he is a human-appearing alien), and "A Death in the House" (October 1959 issue of Galaxy), which is about an old farmer who finds a small crashed UFO and an injured alien in the woods, and keeps the discovery hidden from curious big-city scientists until he can repair the alien's spaceship so it can return to its planet.

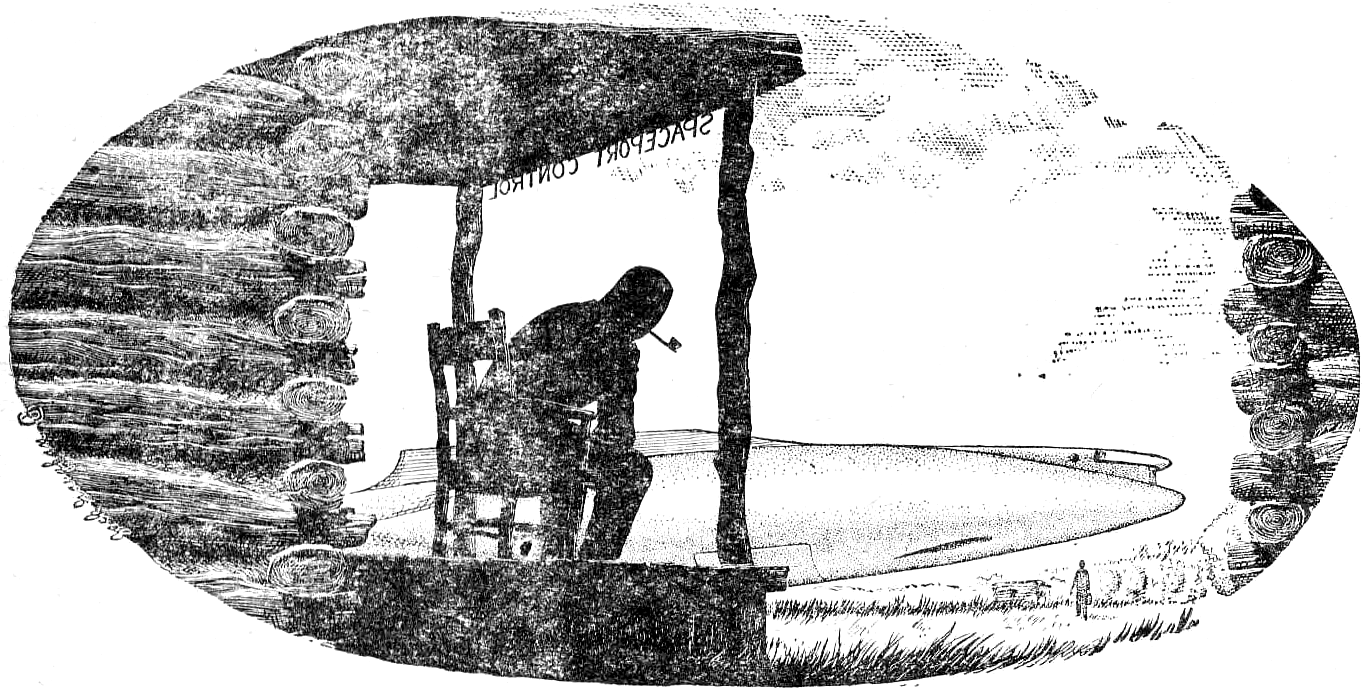
In this early 1950s illustration from Astounding Science Fiction, a man sitting on the porch of a log cabin awaits a visitor who is exiting from a sleek, elongated spaceship.

Under the Dome is a 2013-2015 American science-fiction mystery drama television series based on Stephen King's 2009 novel of the same name which is about the residents of a small town who are trapped under massive, transparent and indestructible dome after an alien species sends an "egg" inside a meteor which crashes in the small town. The alien egg explodes, forming a mysterious transparent force that cuts the town off from the rest of the world. The people trapped inside find their own ways to survive with diminishing resources and rising tensions.

The Austrian-German science fiction film The Wall (2012), like Under the Dome, depicts a mysterious, transparent force field that suddenly appears. In The Wall, based on the 1963 novel Die Wand by Austrian writer Marlen Haushofer, a woman who visits a hunting lodge in the Austrian Alps discovers she is cut off from all human contact by a mysterious invisible wall. In the novel, the female character sees the trappings of modern life visible on the other side of the wall, such as her Mercedes-Benz car, being overgrown by plants. Trapped behind the invisible wall, she learns to hunt animals for food.

In The Tommyknockers a 1987 science fiction novel by Stephen King, a woman living in a rural area in Maine discovers a spaceship that has been buried for millennia on her property. As she excavates the ship, she and the townsfolk gradually fall under the influence of mysterious alien powers. The townsfolk cannot leave the town, due to an invisible barrier, and outsiders are repelled by the noxious gases the ship emits.

Nope is a 2022 American science fiction horror film written, directed, and produced by Jordan Peele, about horse-wrangling siblings who attempt to capture evidence of an unidentified flying object or extraterrestrial flying organism at a ranch in the tiny community in Agua Dulce in California's Sierra Pelona Ridge region.

In John Wyndham's novel The Midwich Cuckoos (1957), extraterrestrials land a silvery object in the rural village of Midwich and all human and animal life is knocked unconscious by an unknown means; after a day they all recover. However, every woman of child-bearing age is pregnant by xenogenesis. Nine months later, 31 boys and 30 girls are born who have none of the genetic characteristics of their mothers. They are not completely human and they have telepathic abilities, they can control others' actions, and they have group minds and accelerated development.

No One Will Save You is a 2023 American science fiction horror film written and directed by Brian Duffield about young seamstress living alone, shunned by the local townspeople, who must fight off a home invasion by gray aliens and their associated parasites that take over the townsfolk that has unexpected consequences.

Resident Alien is a TV series about an extraterrestrial who crash-lands on Earth in a small Colorado town with a mission to wipe out humanity. Instead, the extraterrestrial kills a vacationing physician and takes on his identity. Only the mayor's young son can see his true alien appearance. He develops compassion for humanity and ends up having to defend them from other extraterrestrial threats.

== Pastoral apocalypse ==
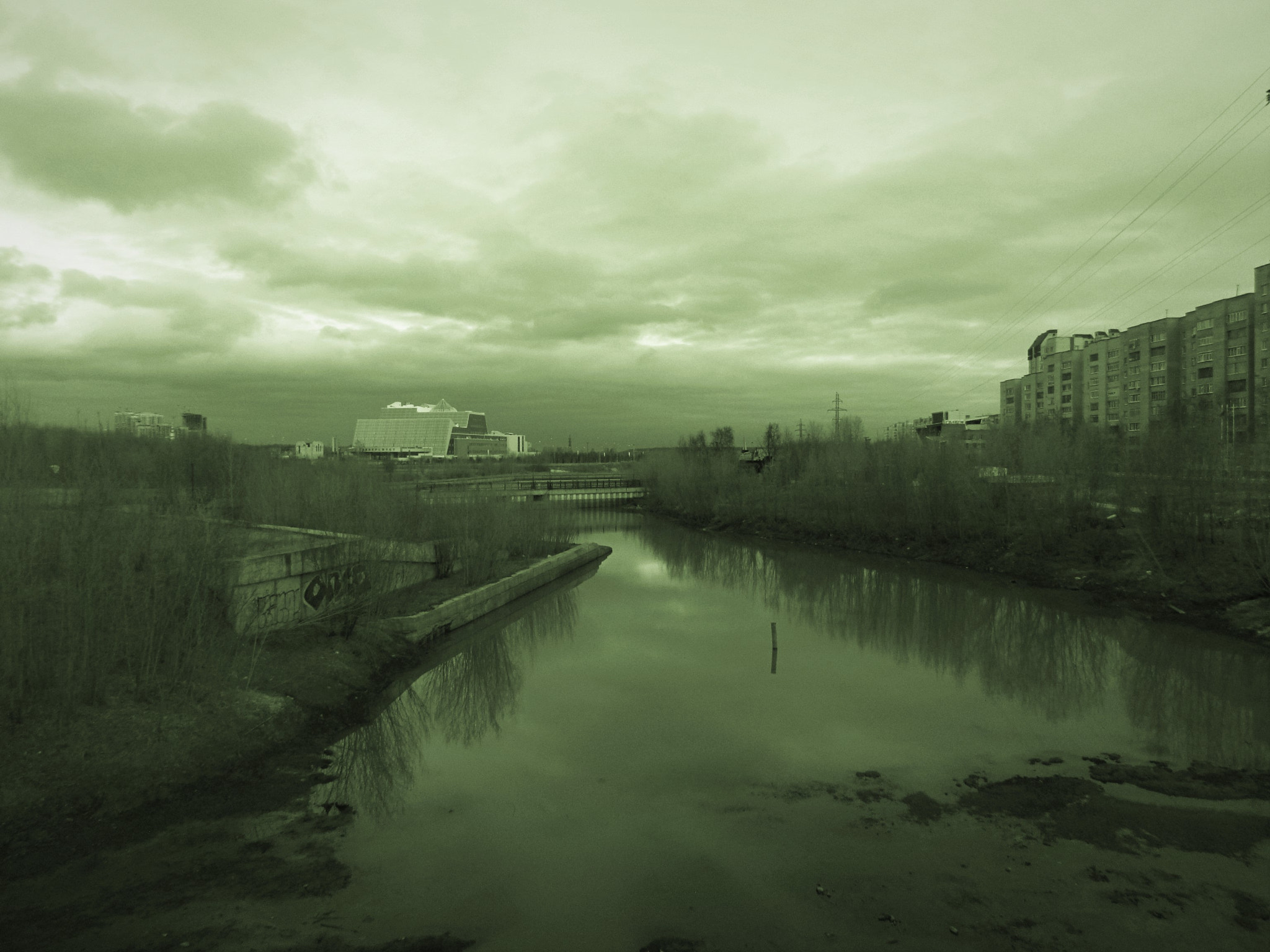
A photo entitled "After Fall" depicts a bleak landscape in which the "world is poisoned as that river is".

Another way to have a pastoral setting in a futuristic science fiction story is to have an advanced civilization revert to a simple, rural way of life after the cities are destroyed by some apocalyptic disaster. Leigh Brackett's The Long Tomorrow has been called the "first example of the American pastoral apocalypse" story. The story is set after a nuclear war, and it depicts a world where Mennonites and Amish farmers teach agricultural skills to fleeing refugees from the ruined cities. The beleaguered United States government passes the Thirtieth Amendment, an anti-city law that limits towns to a thousand people, in an effort to prevent re-urbanization. As is common in pastoral stories, the rural setting is contrasted with a densely populated city area. In this story, the urban area is a secret underground site, Bartorstown, that uses advanced technologies such as nuclear power and a supercomputer. The farm-dwelling Mennonites view Bartorstown's advanced technology as the tools of the devil.

The Wild Shore, Kim Stanley Robinson's first published novel (1984), is the story of survivors of a nuclear war. The nuclear strike consisted of 2,000–3,000 neutron bombs that were detonated in 2,000 of North America's biggest cities in 1987. Survivors have started over, forming villages and living off agriculture and sea. The theme of the first chapters is that of a quite normal pastoral science fiction, which is deconstructed in later chapters. Post-nuclear rural life is hindered from developing further by international treaties imposed by the victorious Soviets, with an unwilling Japan charged with patrolling the West Coast.

Pastoral apocalypse stories are not limited to settings where fertile agrarian communities re-emerge in the countryside from the ashes of a huge disaster. James Lovegrove states that Cormac McCarthy's novel The Road, in which a father and his young son journey on foot across the bleak, desolate post-apocalyptic ash-covered United States some years after an undefined extinction event (in an America where all plant life and virtually all animal life has died) is a pastoral apocalypse.

Paul O. Williams' "Pelbar Cycle" consists of six post-apocalyptic science fiction novels, from The Breaking of Northwall (1981) to The Sword of Forbearance (1985). The Pelbar Cycle is set in North America about a thousand years after a "time of fire" apocalyptic event, in which the world was almost completely depopulated. The novels track a gradual reconnection of the human cultures which developed. Much of the action takes place in the communities of the Pelbar along the Upper Mississippi River, as several cultures, including the matriarchal Pelbar, join to form the Heart River Federation.

The apocalypse does not have to be nuclear war or an extinction event. In Fredric Brown's "The Waveries" (1945 edition of Astounding Science Fiction), aliens invade the United States and they prevent inhabitants from using electricity, so the people have to revert to a simple, rural lifestyle resembling the Amish culture, using horses, buggies and hand tools.

In the 1980s, pastoral apocalypse themes were used by women science fiction authors to explore feminist issues, such as in Ursula Le Guin's Always Coming Home (1985). Le Guin's novel depicts a women-centric pastoral culture that rebuilds after an apocalypse. The book's setting is a time so post-apocalyptic that only a few folk tales even refer to it. The only signs of our civilization that have lasted into their time are indestructible artefacts such as styrofoam and a self-maintaining, solar-powered computer network. There has been a great sea level rise which floods coastal areas. The Kesh use writing, electricity, and the solar-powered computer network, but they do nothing on an industrial scale, as they deplore domination of the natural environment. They reject cities (literal "civilization") and limit settlement to a few-dozen multi-family or large family homes.

Canadian filmmaker Pixie Cram makes pastoral science fiction films that use a style she calls "rustic futurism", in which "systems and machines have largely broken-down, and nature inspires a new approach to old questions. Her film Pragmatopia is about "three young people adrift in the countryside following the nuclear bombing of their city."

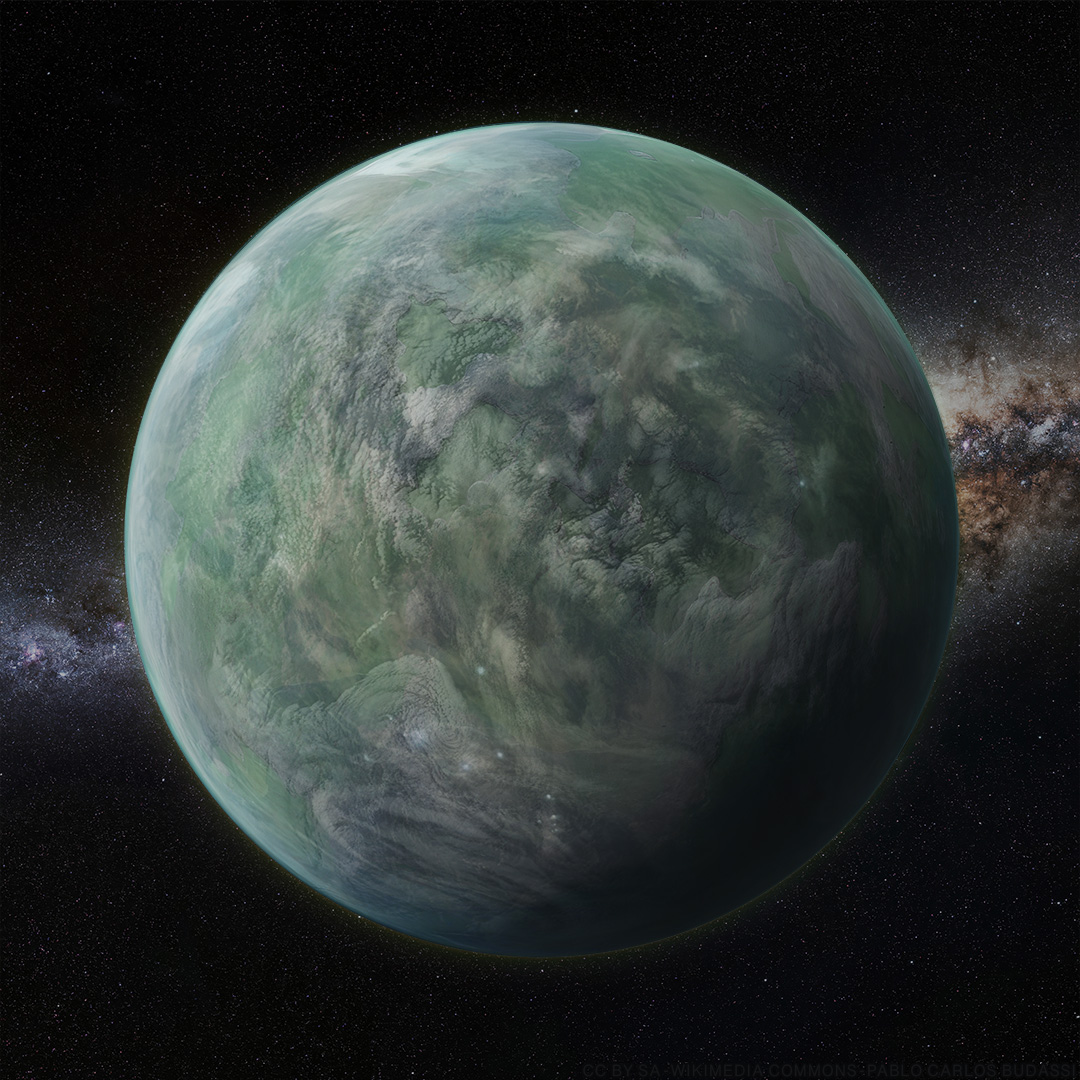
A jungle planet which appears mostly green from space. A jungle planet in another star system might be habitable by humans.

The Arrest (2020) is a post-apocalyptic science fiction novel by Jonathan Lethem set in a small Maine town following the global collapse of technology. The pastoral life of the town is challenged when a large, gleaming nuclear-powered vehicle arrives, carrying the novel's antagonist and many new technologies.

== Terraforming to create a pastoral idyll ==
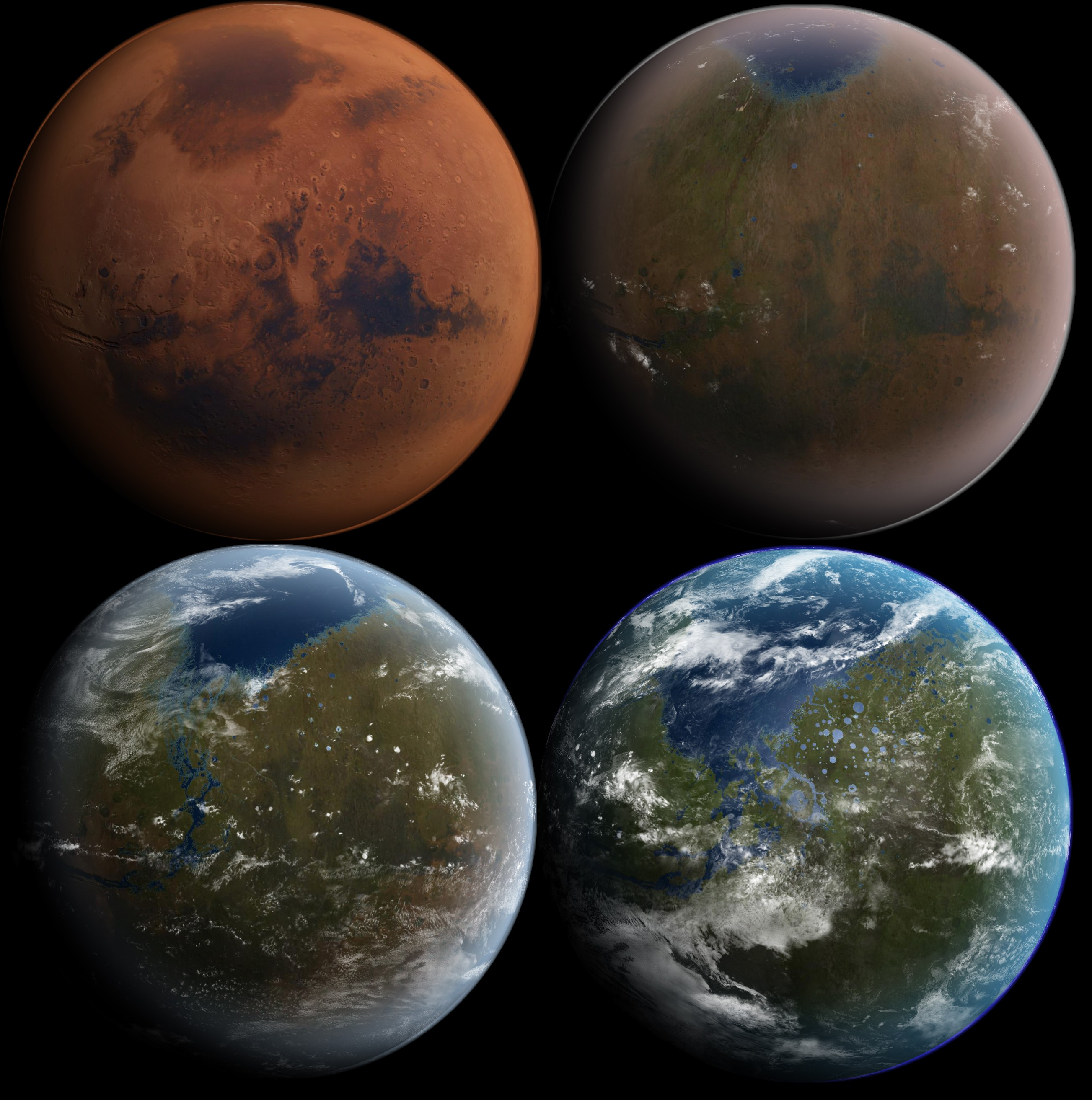
An artist's conception shows a terraformed Mars in four stages of development.

Chris Pak believes that the American Pastoral genre changed when the science fiction concept of "terraforming" became popular in the 1950s. Terraforming stories describe the conversion of alien planets into Earth-like places. These 1950s tales tended to use terraforming stories to retell narratives about American pioneers expanding into the west (repackaged as space pioneers exploring and colonizing uncharted planets). Some stories depict dystopian terraforming situations where the pastoral setting was created using immoral practices, like forcing enslaved aliens to do the terraforming work. As well, stories about terraforming can show how these huge environmental projects can devastate the existing alien environment.

Ray Bradbury's The Martian Chronicles (1958) is a collection of stories, most of which were first published separately in 1946–1952, about the colonization of Mars and its conversion into a planet habitable by humans. Humans settle Mars to escape the problems on Earth, including devastation by a nuclear war. The stories depict indigenous Martians as hostile to the human explorers, who bring chicken pox to the planet which kills most of the Martians. Bradbury said he "subconsciously borrowed" elements from John Steinbeck's novel The Grapes of Wrath, which Bradbury read at age nineteen, the year the novel was published.

Robert Heinlein's Farmer in the Sky is the earliest novel about terraforming. In the book's future setting, food is carefully rationed on an overcrowded Earth. Teenager Bill Lermer emigrates with his father to a farming colony on Ganymede, one of Jupiter's moons. The arriving colonists realize that the soil has to be built from scratch before it will support crops.

Arthur C. Clarke's The Sands of Mars (1951) is an ironic take on the pastoral depictions of colonization. Examples of stories about planetary adaptation that leads to dystopian outcomes include Frederik Pohl and C.M. Kornbluth's The Space Merchants (1974), Walter M. Miller's Crucifixus Etiam (1973), and Poul Anderson's The Big Rain (2001).

In the late 1950s, terraforming stories were increasingly focused on humans' efforts to modify planets that already had alien species on them (rather than adding life to a sterile, rocky planet). These stories examined the political and philosophical implications of changing the environment of a planet and the impacts on the native inhabitants. In Robert A Heinlein's Red Planet (1949), teens from a Mars colony meet Martian creatures and realize that the native inhabitants are being oppressed. The teens join the Indigenous inhabitants' rebellion against human colonization.

Ursula Le Guin's The Word for World is Forest is set on a military logging colony set up on the fictional planet of Athshe by people from Earth. The colonists have enslaved the gentle native Athsheans, and treat them harshly. Eventually, one of the native inhabitants, whose wife was raped and killed by an Earth military officer, leads a rebellion against the loggers, and ousts them from the planet. However, in the process their peaceful Athshean culture is exposed to war for the first time.

Richard McKenna's "Hunter, Come Home" (March 1963 issue of The Magazine of Fantasy and Science Fiction) is about planet ecologies that safeguard humans. It is set on the fictional planet Mordin, where the human colonists use killing a giant creature, the "Great Russel", as their coming of age ritual. Over the years, young men decimate the Great Russels population through this hunt. To ensure that all young men can keep doing the manhood ritual, which is important to their culture, the government tries to terraform a nearby planet with the plan of breeding Great Russels on it. As a preliminary step, the terraforming team releases poison to kill the native plants, but the plants manage to absorb the poison and the terraforming plans are stymied.

== Environmental themes ==
Christopher Cokinos states that Simak's Time and Again has elements that belie the stereotypes we have of the writer, since the "environmental attitude" expands Aldo Leopold's Land Ethic" while using lyricism that also evokes Leopold's approach. The story is about a lost space traveler who had voyaged to a distant star system who finds his way back to Earth after two decades. The space voyager is no longer human after his decades in space, as he was influenced by an alien species with psychic powers. He finds Earth is a comfortable paradise, except that all is not as it seems. Some of the inhabitants are androids that can reproduce, robots work as slaves, and secret assassins have been sent there from the future to prevent him from writing a book in the future that will have a major impact on society.

Sawyer states that Ursula Le Guin is referred to as pastoral science fiction author due to her setting of her science fiction works in "a-technological" countryside settings, such as in City of Illusions (despite the title, most of the story is set in the forest and plains) and the story The Word for World is Forest, which Ian Watson said shows influence from the pastoral poet Andrew Marvell.

Jason W. Ellis states that James Cameron's science fiction film Avatar "on the level of [its] narrative, re-inscribes and challenges the concept of the machine in the garden" as set out by Leo Marx and Ben-Tov. Ellis states that in the film, human space travelers (space marines, scientists and engineers) "and their machines invade Pandora's idyllic garden as part of an imperialistic expansion of capitalistic rapaciousness. The tranquility of the pastoral scene is disturbed and broken by the technological ends of industrialization." Ellis notes that the lush alien planet, Pandora, is depicted as "an in-between space" (as set out in Leo Marx's paradigm), but it also shows a "fusion of the pastoral and the technological into a third way, a techno-ecological possibility for hope in a sustainable world."

In Here There Be Tygers (1972), Ray Bradbury depicts a setting in which a beautiful utopia on a green pastoral planet makes a spaceship's resource extraction team reminisce about their childhoods.

Becky Chambers' debut novel, A Psalm for the Wild-Built (2015), is an "eclogue" or "pastoral dialogue" set on Panga, a fictional Earth-like planet where robots, which achieved sentience in the human cities several centuries ago, have left the urban centers to live free from human oversight in the countryside. Without their computer-automated factories and robot workers, the humans have adopted a simpler agrarian lifestyle based around small communities, using a solarpunk approach in which technology such as solar-powered computers and pedal-powered vehicles are used to live sustainably. For the robots' part, without access to factories producing new robot parts, the robots repair their components using scavenged components.

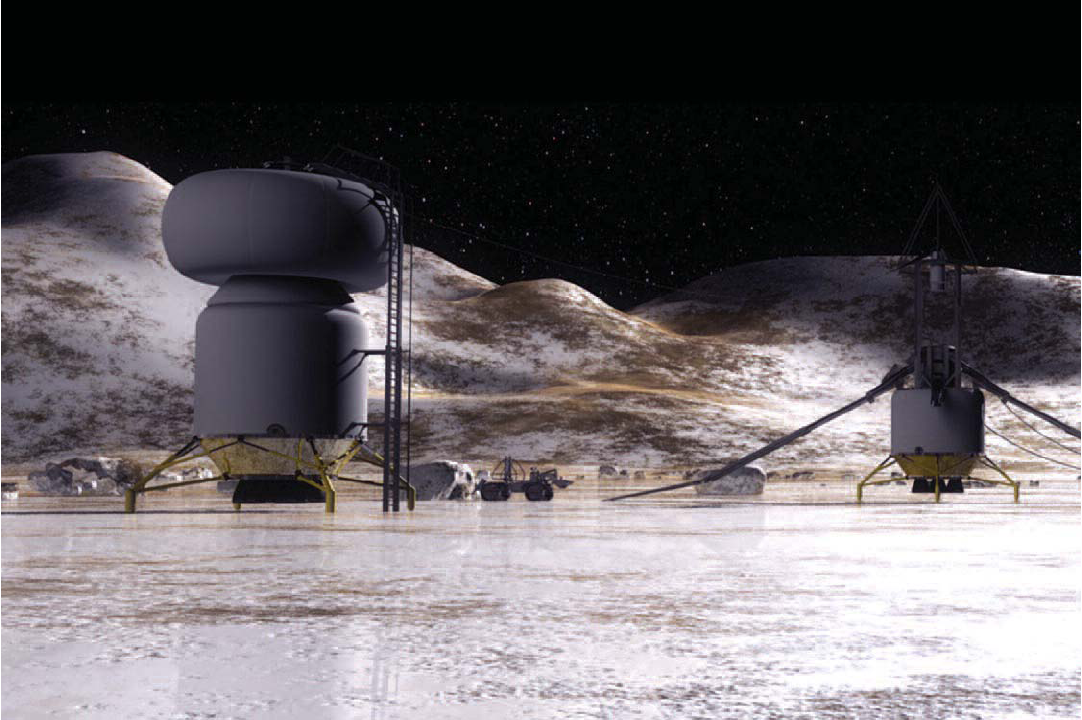
A terraformed planet or moon might still face resource scarcity, as shown on this artist's impression of the bare, icy surface of a human base on Callisto, a moon of Jupiter.

Not all pastoral SF depicts green, fertile agricultural regions or plains teeming with wildlife. Some works in the subgenre are set in forbidding deserts and desolate wastelands such as Frank Herbert's Dune (1965) and Ursula K. Le Guin's The Dispossessed (1999). In these harsh environments, humans can only extract meager resources from the land by developing "supportive social frameworks." As such, these works focus on the political implications of resource scarcity for communities.

Joan Slonczewski's A Door into Ocean is another example of feminist pastoral science fiction. It is set in the future, on the fictional planet of Shora, a moon covered by water. The inhabitants of this planet, known as Sharers, are all female and they use genetic engineering to control the ecology of their planet. They are peaceful beings who share resources and treat everyone equally. When they are being threatened by an outside power in an invasion, they resist nonviolently.

== Other themes ==
In the British film Skeletons (2010), two psychic investigators "walk through the British countryside" and access portals to "visit couples and others who want to exhume and clear out the secrets" in each other's lives.

White Dwarf is a 1995 American science fiction television film directed by Peter Markle which is about a medical student in 3040 who is completing his internship on the fictional rural planet of Rusta. The planet is tidally locked to its primary, so it is divided into contrasting halves of day and night with the halves separated by a wall.

"The Contrary Gardener" is a story by Christopher Rowe about a gardener, Kay Lynne, who works in a southeastern part of the United States in the near future. The rigidly controlled society, in which even social interactions are regulated, uses a combination of human gardeners and robots to grow genetically altered fruits and vegetables to provide food. As well, genetically modified beans are used as ammunition in an ongoing war.

The movie eXistenZ is about a new virtual reality game that the designer launches at an isolated rural location. The players connect to the game by plugging into a cyber-port drilled into the spine. The game is played in a rural setting, amidst wooded areas, trout aquaculture farms that are growing mutated fish and a small-town gas station where players can get illegal black market bio-ports for game play installed. Reviewer Gilbert Adair notes that it is unusual for a science fiction story to be set in the countryside and calls it a "rural science-fiction movie."

Simon Stålenhag is a Swedish artist who does retro-futuristic digital art "which combine[s] bucolic visions of rural Sweden with sci-fi elements" The settings of his artwork formed the basis for the 2020 Amazon television drama series Tales from the Loop. His graphic novel The Electric State was adapted into the 2025 Netflix film of the same name, which is about the aftermath of fictional 1990 war between humans and robots which left the world in disarray, and which led to robots being banished to a remote desert.

== Post-pastoral, urban pastoral and other variants ==
In 1994, British literature professor Terry Gifford proposed the concept of a "post-pastoral" subgenre. By appending the prefix "post-", Gifford does not intend this to refer to "after" but rather to the sense of "reaching beyond" the contraints of the pastoral genre, but while continuing the core conceptual elements that have defined the pastoral tradition. Gifford states that the post-pastoral is "best used to describe works that successfully suggest a collapse of the human/nature divide whilst being aware of the problematics involved", noting that it is "more about connection than the disconnections essential to the pastoral". He gives examples of post-pastoral works, including Cormac McCarthy's The Road (2006), Margaret Atwood's The Year of the Flood (2009) and Maggie Gee's The Ice People (1999), and he points out that these works "raise questions of ethics, sustenance and sustainability that might exemplify [Leo] Marx's vision of the pastoral needing to find new forms in the face of new conditions".

Gifford states that British eco-critics such as Greg Garrard have used the "post-pastoral" concept, as well as other variants: "gay pastoral", the seemingly contradictory "urban pastoral" and "radical pastoral". Gay pastoral is not a new subgenre: homoerotic pastoral fiction dates back to Antiquity, such with works like Virgil's (70 BC – 19 BC) second pastoral eclogue, "Formosum pastor Corydon ardebat Alexin" ("The shepherd Corydon burned with passion for pretty Alexis"), which focuses on a shepherd's gay romance.

Gifford lists further examples of pastoral variants, which he calls "prefix-pastoral[s]": "postmodern pastoral,...hard pastoral, soft pastoral, Buell's revolutionary lesbian feminist pastoral, black pastoral, ghetto pastoral, frontier pastoral, militarized pastoral, domestic pastoral and, most recently, a specifically 'Irish pastoral'".

In 2014, The Cambridge Companion to the City in Literature had a chapter on the urban pastoral subgenre.

== See also ==
- Biblical speculative fiction
- Mundane science fiction (it may also use environmental themes)
- Climate fiction
- Solarpunk
