= Andy Muschietti =

Argentine filmmaker (born 1973)

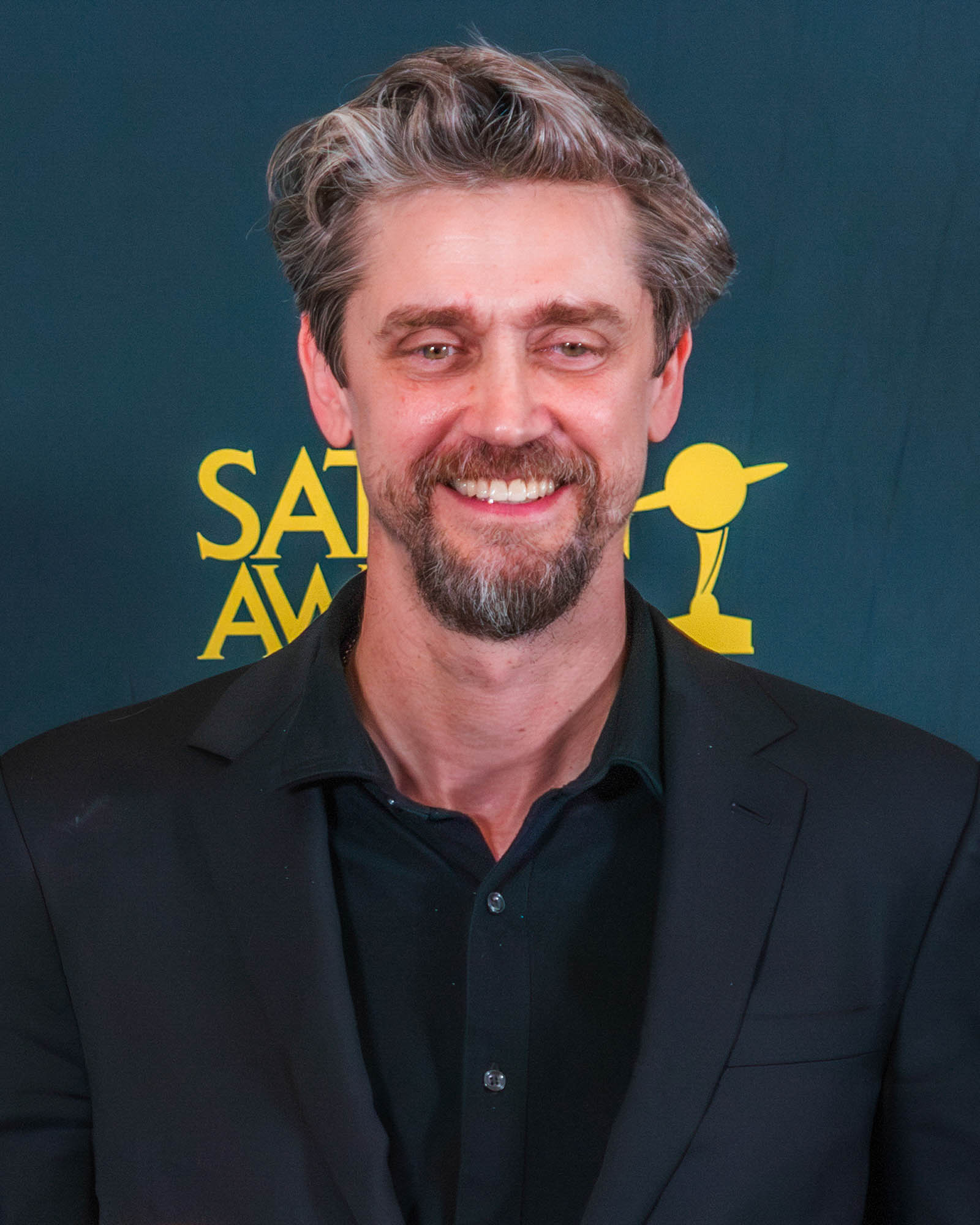
- Muschietti in 2026
- Born: Andrés Walter Muschietti; 26 August 1973 (age 53); Vicente López, Buenos Aires, Argentina
- Occupations: Film director; screenwriter
- Years active: 1995–present
- Relatives: Barbara Muschietti (sister)

Andrés "Andy" Walter Muschietti (Spanish: [musˈkjeti]; born 26 August 1973) is an Argentine film director and screenwriter who had his breakthrough with the 2013 film Mama. He gained further recognition for directing both films in the It film series, the 2017 film adaptation of the Stephen King novel and its 2019 sequel, It Chapter Two. In 2023, he directed the DC Extended Universe film The Flash. In 2025, Muschietti developed and executive-produced the HBO series It: Welcome to Derry, of which he directed 4 episodes.

== Early life ==
Muschietti was born and raised in Vicente López, Buenos Aires and has one older sister, Barbara Muschietti. Both he and his sister studied at Fundación Universidad del Cine. He worked as a storyboard artist during his early years in the film industry. He is of Italian-Argentine ancestry.

== Career ==
In 2013, Muschietti directed his debut film, the supernatural horror Mama, which he co-wrote with Neil Cross and his sister Barbara Muschietti, with the latter also acting as producer. It was based on Muschietti's three-minute short film Mamá, which attracted Guillermo del Toro, who stated that it had the "scariest" scenes he had "ever seen". The short convinced del Toro to executive produce the feature-length film, which starred Jessica Chastain, Nikolaj Coster-Waldau, Megan Charpentier, Isabelle Nélisse, and Javier Botet, and was released by Universal Pictures on 18 January 2013. The film had a budget of $15 million and grossed more than $146 million.

In July 2015, after the departure of Cary Joji Fukunaga, Muschietti was hired by New Line Cinema to direct It, the two-part adaptation of the Stephen King's novel. Barbara produced it, along with Dan Lin, Roy Lee, Seth Grahame-Smith and David Katzenberg. The film was released in two chapters in 2017 and 2019.

In July 2019, Muschietti entered into negotiations to direct The Flash, a film set in the DC Extended Universe, from a screenplay by Christina Hodson; his sister, Barbara, was set to serve as a producer. Muschetti was the fifth director to have been attached to The Flash (Seth Grahame-Smith, Rick Famuyiwa, John Francis Daley & Jonathan Goldstein had previously been attached to it at various points). In August 2019, Muschietti confirmed that The Flash would be his next project, following the release of It Chapter Two.

In April 2021, Andy and Barbara formed their own production company, called Double Dream, with The Flash serving as the company's first project. The Flash had its world premiere on 25 April 2023 at CinemaCon; this was followed by a wide release on 16 June 2023.

In June 2023, Muschietti was reported to be the studio's top choice to direct The Brave and the Bold for the DC Universe. Muschietti would not formally commit to the film until a script materialized after the 2023 Writers Guild of America strike concluded. Muschietti was confirmed to have signed on later in the month. Later that month, he, Barbara and their production company Double Dream signed parallel three-year first-look deals with Warner Bros. Pictures, Warner Bros. Television Studios, and HBO Max.

In December 2024, Muschietti announced that he was writing a new science fiction film that he believed would move forward to production before The Brave and the Bold. In May 2025, it was announced that Muschietti would direct the project, entitled Drift, for Skydance Media, based on a short story of the same name. The film was described as a cross between Alfonso Cuarón's Gravity and Denis Villeneuve's Arrival.

== Previously announced projects ==
Since 2013, Muschietti has been reported to be involved in, or under consideration for, several other projects that have yet to come to fruition and whose status has not been publicly updated.

In February 2013, Universal Pictures announced Muschietti would direct the film adaptation of the Josh Malerman novel Bird Box, which Scott Stuber, Chris Morgan and Barbara Muschietti would produce, with Eric Heisserer set to write the script. The eventual film would be released on Netflix with Susanne Bier directing.

In September 2013, Universal hired Muschietti for a reboot of The Mummy franchise, but he left the project in May 2014 due to creative differences with Jon Spaihts' draft of the script.

In January 2014, Muschietti was reportedly among front-runners to direct a He-Man film for Warner Bros. Pictures, a remake of Masters of the Universe. The remake would eventually be released on June 2026 by Amazon MGM Studios, with Travis Knight directing.

In June 2014, Deadline reported that Muschietti was on the shortlist of directors to direct a sequel to the fantasy film Snow White and the Huntsman for Universal. The sequel was finally released on April 2016, directed by Cedric Nicolas-Troyan.

In September 2014, Sony Pictures tapped Muschietti to direct the film adaptation of Shadow of the Colossus after Josh Trank left due to a commitment to a Star Wars spin-off film. Barbara was set to co-produce the film with Kevin Misher, and Seth Lochhead was set to write the screenplay.

In February 2015, Deadline reported that Sony was looking to hire Muschietti to direct a live-action Robotech project, with Gianni Nunnari and Mark Canton attached to produce, and Michael B. Gordon to serve as screenwriter.

In March 2015, Plan B Entertainment optioned the film rights to Stephen King's short story "The Jaunt" from the Skeleton Crew collection, with Muschietti to direct and Barbara attached as producer.

In December 2015, it was reported that Muschietti would direct an adaptation of The Witch of Lime Street, about Harry Houdini.

In September 2017, Deadline reported that Muschietti was attached to a film version of Dracul.

In December 2017, it was announced that Muschietti was in talks to direct the film adaptation of the sci-fi novel The Electric State by Simon Stålenhag, with the Russo brothers producing alongside Andy and Barbara Muschietti. In December 2020, it was announced that the Russos would direct the film, with the Muschiettis serving as executive producers.

In October 2018, it was announced that Muschietti would direct a Warner Bros. live-action film reboot of Attack on Titan.

In November 2018, it was announced that Muschietti would develop a new film adaptation of The Time Machine with his sister Barbara. Leonardo DiCaprio was attached to produce.

In August 2019, it was announced that Muschietti would produce a film adaptation of King’s novel Roadwork, with Pablo Trapero directing.

In January 2020, it was announced that Muschietti would direct a remake of The Howling for Netflix.

In April 2021, it was announced that Muschietti would direct an adaptation of The Doubtful Guest, with Andy and Barbara Muschietti producing. Kumail Nanjiani and Emily V. Gordon would write the screenplay and also serve as executive producers, while Amblin Entertainment would produce the film as well.

In July 2021, it was reported that Muschietti would develop and direct the pilot for the series adaptation The Final Girl Support Group at HBO Max. In July 2026, Paramount Pictures purchased the rights to turn it into a film instead, with Christopher Landon now directing. Muschietti would remain attached as producer.

== Filmography ==
=== Film ===
Year	Title	Director	Writer	Producer	Notes
1999	Historias Breves 3	Partial	Partial	No	Segment: "Nostalgia en la mesa 8"
2008	Mamá	Yes	Yes	No	Short film
2013	Mama	Yes	Yes	No	Feature directorial debut
2017	It	Yes	No	No	
2019	It Chapter Two	Yes	No	No	
2023	The Flash	Yes	No	No	
2025	The Electric State	No	No	Executive	
2026	They Will Kill You	No	No	Yes	

=== Television ===
Year	Title	Director	Executive producer	Notes
2020–2022	Locke & Key	No	Yes	
2025–present	It: Welcome to Derry	Yes	Yes	4 episodes
2026	Ride or Die	No	Yes	

Other credits

Year	Title	Role
1995	Fotos del alma	Assistant director
1996	Moebius	Public relations manager
1996	Evita	Set production assistant
2000	Una noche con Sabrina Love	Second assistant director

Acting roles

Year	Title	Role	Notes
2000	Una noche con Sabrina Love	TV switcher	
2019	It Chapter Two	Customer at pharmacy	Uncredited
2023	The Flash	Reporter with hot dog	
2024	Música	Subway busker	
2026	Minions & Monsters	Max	Voice; Spanish version only
