= The Master of the Mill =

1946 novel by Frederick Philip Grove

The Master of the Mill is a 1946 novel by German-Canadian writer Frederick Philip Grove (1879 – 1948). The story takes place in northwestern Ontario in 1938. Through recollections, it spans several generations of the Clark family, who own a flour mill. The family introduces mechanization of their flour mill to make workers’ tasks easier, but instead it creates a cold, isolated life for them. The novel explores the impact of colonization and industrialization in the late nineteenth century and the first third of the twentieth century in North America, and examines themes of the "Promised Land" ideal. In Salvator Proietti's article in Science Fiction Studies, he calls the novel an example of pastoral utopianism.

== Plot ==
A wealthy humanitarian and botanist, Senator Samuel Clark reflects on his experiences as he nears the end of his life, insulated from day-to-day affairs by his position as the patriarch of a large estate.

His father started a small mill in an isolated town, using the river to power the mill. While his time as a botanist was a time of contribution to society as he developed new types of plants, Clark feels guilty about creating a mechanized flour mill, which led to his father and son becoming dominated by their service to the company and its machines. He is saddened that the family's efforts to reduce the burden of work by automation essentially turned people into parts of a machine, removing their independence and learning them with cold, empty lives. By the end of the novel, Clark finds a spark of hope that the human spirit can be rekindled.

== Reception ==
The Canadian Encyclopedia calls The Master of the Mill "a painstakingly researched, prophetic attempt to trace the effects of industrial mechanization on individuals, societies and civilization”, and says that it has “been criticized for being too technically demanding, with its frequently shifting time frame and points of view, and its complicated subplots.” Grove researched the novel in 1928, when he did a detailed study of the flour-milling industry. Robin Mathews' 1982 article on the novel, which analyzes the book's weight versions, found that “Nietzsche's will in history is manifested in various ways, and is more or less apparent in different versions of the novel.” In Grove's reading of modern society in North America, he describes the "pastoral ethos" where people "give up their worldly striving in favor of a simpler, more contemplative life" (as set out in Leo Marx's works), but shows that it cannot be an "expansionist and Jeffersonian industrialized version" of the ideal".
