= The Electric State (film) =

2025 film by Anthony and Joe Russo

- Release poster
- Directed by: Anthony Russo; Joe Russo
- Screenplay by: Christopher Markus; Stephen McFeely
- Based on: The Electric State by Simon Stålenhag
- Produced by: Russell Ackerman; Chris Castaldi; Mike Larocca; Patrick Newall; Anthony Russo; Joe Russo
- Starring: Millie Bobby Brown; Chris Pratt; Ke Huy Quan; Jason Alexander; Woody Harrelson; Anthony Mackie; Brian Cox; Jenny Slate; Giancarlo Esposito; Stanley Tucci
- Cinematography: Stephen F. Windon
- Edited by: Jeffrey Ford
- Music by: Alan Silvestri
- Production companies: AGBO Films; Double Dream; Skybound Entertainment
- Distributed by: Netflix
- Release dates: February 24, 2025 (Grauman's Egyptian Theatre); March 14, 2025 (United States)
- Running time: 128 minutes
- Country: United States
- Language: English
- Budget: $320 million

The Electric State is a 2025 American science fiction action-adventure film produced and directed by Anthony and Joe Russo. Its screenplay by Christopher Markus and Stephen McFeely is loosely based on the 2018 illustrated novel by Simon Stålenhag. The film stars Millie Bobby Brown, Chris Pratt, Ke Huy Quan (in a dual role), Jason Alexander, Woody Harrelson, Anthony Mackie, Brian Cox, Jenny Slate, Giancarlo Esposito and Stanley Tucci.

Plans for a film adaptation were announced in 2017, with Andy Muschietti. The Russo brothers signed on to direct in December 2020. Universal Pictures acquired the distribution rights before Netflix took over the rights in June 2022. Much of the cast was revealed between June 2022 and November 2024, with filming taking place in Atlanta, Georgia in fall 2022. With a reported budget of $320 million, it is one of the most expensive films ever made.

The Electric State premiered at Grauman's Egyptian Theatre in Los Angeles on February 24, 2025, and was released on Netflix on March 14. It received negative reviews from critics, who criticized the plot and unfaithfulness to the original source material, although the visual effects and action sequences were praised.

== Plot ==
In an alternate 1990, a war between humans and robots has left the world in disarray. With the help of Sentre CEO Ethan Skate, who developed Neurocaster technology that allowed humans to upload their minds into drone robots, humanity managed to win the war, while robots were banished to the Exclusion Zone. However, the success of this technology meant many people opted to live their virtual lives in a semi-vegetative state while drones did most of the work.

In 1994, teenager Michelle lives with her deadbeat foster dad Ted. Years earlier, she was involved in a car crash along with her family, in which her parents and brother reportedly perished, and has since lived with a succession of foster families. Michelle is also having trouble at school due to her refusal to use Neurocaster technology to participate in virtual classes.

One day, the sentient robot Cosmo – a robot character of the cartoon of the same name which Michelle's declared-deceased younger brother Christopher, who was a child prodigy, watched – finds Michelle. He is only able to communicate using gestures and a limited set of pre-recorded words, but manages to convince her that he is controlled by Christopher. Michelle and Cosmo set out across a dystopian landscape to find him by first finding Dr. Clark Amherst, the doctor who confirmed Christopher's death. Along the way, they encounter Keats, a veteran, and Herman, a sentient robot who is able to take on multiple forms. Together, they eventually meet up with a band of robots in the Exclusion Zone led by Mr. Peanut.

There, they find Dr. Amherst and his robot friend P.C., who explains that Sentre found Christopher in a seemingly permanent vegetative state after the accident and discovered that they could create the Neurocaster technology by exploiting Christopher's exceptional intellect and integrating his consciousness into the Neurocaster; this technology was instrumental in giving humans an advantage in the war against the robots. However, after Christopher unexpectedly came out of his coma thirteen months later, a remorseful Amherst built a way for his mind to escape. Sentre drones, under the command of Colonel Bradbury, attack and recapture Christopher, killing Amherst and destroying the robots' home.

Determined to rescue her brother, Michelle and P.C. infiltrate Sentre's headquarters with the help of Keats and Herman, while the other robots wage war with Skate's drone army. Disgusted with Skate's actions, Bradbury defects and helps Peanut to confront Skate while Michelle discovers Christopher in a comatose state, his consciousness trapped within the Neurocaster system.

In the virtual realm, Christopher explains to Michelle that his consciousness is powering Skate's drones, and expresses his desire to be freed from his exploited existence. Michelle disconnects him, resulting in his physical body dying. Christopher's death triggers the shutdown of Sentre's drone operations.

In the aftermath, Skate is arrested and the world begins to rebuild from the devastation wrought by the war and corporate greed. Michelle then broadcasts to the world exposing how the Neurocaster technology has affected people's lives and inviting those who wish to live in peace to the Exclusion Zone.

Cosmo's body is dumped in a junkyard, but he is shown rising up, suggesting that a part of Christopher's consciousness may still reside within the robot.

== Cast ==
- Millie Bobby Brown as Michelle Leona Greene, a teenager that lives in foster care
  - Emma Maltby serves as a double for Michelle
- Chris Pratt as John D. Keats, a former robot war soldier, drifter, and smuggler who makes a living selling stuff that he finds in the Exclusion Zone
- Ke Huy Quan as Dr. Clark Amherst, a medical doctor and scientist at Sentre who took refuge in the Exclusion Zone
- Jason Alexander as Ted Finister, Michelle's deadbeat foster father who operates the drone Wingman
- Giancarlo Esposito as Marshall Bradbury, a soldier who was nicknamed the "Butcher of Schenectady"
- Stanley Tucci as Ethan Skate, the CEO of Sentre
- Woody Norman as Christopher, Michelle's brother whose comatose body was used in Sentre's experiments
- Marin Hinkle as Ms. Sablinsky, the school counselor at Michelle's school
- Michael Trucco as Ben Abbott
- Holly Hunter as Madeline Vance
- Patti Harrison as Ligotti
- Ann Russo as Michelle and Christopher's mom
- Greg Comer as Michelle and Christopher's dad
- Camrus Johnson as Corporal Cason
- Antoinette LaVecchia as Elena Skate

=== Voices ===
- Anthony Mackie as Herman, a robot and Keats' partner-in-crime
- Woody Harrelson as Mr. Peanut, a robot version of the famous Planters mascot who leads the robots in the Exclusion Zone
- Jenny Slate as Penny Pal, a mail carrier robot that lives in the Exclusion Zone
- Ke Huy Quan as P.C., a robot that Dr. Amherst built to assist him and has his voice
- Alan Tudyk as Cosmo, a robot based on the cartoon character that contains parts of Christopher's mind
- Brian Cox as Popfly, a baseball-themed robot that lives in the Exclusion Zone
- Hank Azaria as Perplexo, a magician robot that lives in the Exclusion Zone
- Colman Domingo as Wolfe, a drone customer of Keats whose operator is not shown in person
- Rob Gronkowski as Blitz, a football-themed robot that lives in the Exclusion Zone
- Jordan Black as Clem, a hamburger-themed robot that lives in the Exclusion Zone and sold whatever food he had left
- Billy Gardell as Garbage Bot
- Susan Leslie as Mrs. Scissors, a hairdresser-themed robot that lives in the Exclusion Zone
- Joe Russo as Skeevy Bot
- Will Lyman as a documentary narrator
- Kurt Loder as himself, his voice can be heard in one of the news reports

=== Motion-capture artists ===
- Terry Notary as:
  - Mr. Peanut
  - Pop Fly
  - Sentre Drones
  - Ice Cream Bot
  - Skeeve Bot
- Adam Croasdell as:
  - The Marshall
  - Taco Bot
  - Sentry Bot
  - Blitz
- Chris Silvestri as:
  - P.C.
  - Perplexo
  - Construction Bot
  - Clem
  - Lieutenant Leeks
  - Garbage Can Bot
- Devyn Dalton as Cosmo
- Phoenix Notary as Young Cosmo
- Gabrielle Maiden as
  - Penny Pal
  - Mrs. Scissors
  - Happy Pill Bot
  - Sentre Drones
- Martin Klebba as:
  - Herman
  - Milkman Bot

== Production ==
The film was announced in December 2017, when Anthony and Joe Russo acquired the rights to Simon Stålenhag's 2018 illustrated novel The Electric State. The Russos were set as producers, with Andy Muschietti in negotiations to direct. Christopher Markus and Stephen McFeely, frequent collaborators of the Russo brothers, were set to write the screenplay. In December 2020, Universal Pictures won the distribution rights to the film, with the Russos now directing and Muschietti remaining as an executive producer on the project via his new production company. Millie Bobby Brown was slated to star, with production set to begin as soon as the Russos completed The Gray Man (2022) and Brown concluded filming for season four of Stranger Things.

In June 2022, it was reported that the film might have its distribution rights transferred to Netflix, as Universal was no longer planning to give the film a theatrical release. Later that month, it was confirmed that Netflix would be distributing the film, with Chris Pratt in talks to star alongside Brown. Pratt was confirmed in August, with Michelle Yeoh, Stanley Tucci, Jason Alexander, Brian Cox and Jenny Slate joining the cast. Cox and Slate were reported to be voicing characters in the film. In October, Woody Norman was added to the cast. In November, Giancarlo Esposito was cast in the film as the voice of Marshall, a menacing robotic drone. Anthony Mackie and Billy Bob Thornton also joined the cast. Ke Huy Quan, Yeoh's co-star in Everything Everywhere All at Once (2022), had to replace her after she left the project due to scheduling conflicts. In October 2024, it was reported that Woody Harrelson, Alan Tudyk, Hank Azaria and Colman Domingo had joined the cast as the voices of robot characters.

Principal photography began in October 2022 in Atlanta, under the working title Stormwind. On November 4, 2022, film production was temporarily paused after a crew member working on the film died in a car crash off-set. Filming wrapped in early February 2023. February 2024, reshoots had occurred from March 20 to April 5. The score was composed by Alan Silvestri, marking the third collaboration between Silvestri and the Russo Brothers, following their work on Avengers: Infinity War (2018) and Avengers: Endgame (2019).

== Marketing ==
The Electric State sponsored NASCAR Craftsman Truck Series Ford of Frankie Muniz at Daytona

The first images and a plot summary of the film were released by Netflix on October 1, 2024. Dais Johnston of Inverse expressed concerns that these photos were confirmation that the film would seemingly be unfaithful to the original book since it showcased a visual style that involved "muddy color-grading" compared to the original artwork from Stålenhag.

Netflix released a teaser trailer on October 17, 2024, during New York Comic Con. It was confirmed that the film would largely diverge from the original source material in the hopes of telling its own original story, which received a negative response by fans that hoped for a direct adaptation.

These major plot changes were explained at the film's panel, which involved Anthony Russo stating that they did find the original material as "fascinating" and compared their experience of adapting it as similar to the Marvel films. But he also stated that it was difficult for them to understand the story and felt that the world was not shown enough in the graphic novel, which caused the idea of developing it into a two-hour film as challenging. This led to them using the artwork as inspiration to make an entirely new story that featured the usage of 1990s aesthetics and the plot addition of robotic animatronics developing artificial intelligence, which involved them campaigning for equal rights in a retro-futuristic society.

== Release ==
The Electric State had its world premiere on February 24, 2025, at Grauman's Egyptian Theatre, in Los Angeles, California. The film was released on Netflix on March 14, 2025.

== Reception ==
=== Viewership ===
The Electric State debuted at No. 1 on Netflix's English films chart from March 10–16, accumulating 25.2 million views. The following week, from March 17–23, it remained in the top position on the English films list with 22.5 million views. In the subsequent week, between March 24–30, the film placed No. 2 on the English films chart, garnering 7.6 million views. Nielsen Media Research, which records streaming viewership on certain U.S. television screens, reported that it was streamed for 3.254 billion minutes between January and June 2025, ranking seventh among films in that period. Netflix later announced that in the first half of 2025, The Electric State garnered 158.2 million hours of watch time across 74.2 million views, placing seventh among films on the platform. For the full year, Nielsen Media recorded 3.8 billion minutes of watch time, ranking the film eighth among the "Top Movies for General Audiences" of 2025.

=== Critical response ===
The film received negative reviews from critics. On the review aggregator website Rotten Tomatoes, 14% of 158 critics' reviews are positive, with an average rating of 3.7/10. The website's consensus reads: "Lumbering along like a giant automaton, The Electric State has plenty of hardware to back it up but none of the spark that'd make it come to life." Metacritic, which uses a weighted average, assigned the film a score of 30 out of 100, based on 37 critics, indicating "generally unfavorable" reviews.

Many critics took issue with the film's loose interpretation of the original novel. In a scathing review by The New York Times, Elisabeth Vincentelli panned the film's creative departures from the source material. She opens her review describing the plot of the novel, highlighting how "the book is elliptical in narrative, muted in color palette and melancholy in mood" whereas the movie "is obvious, garish and just plain dumb". Courtney Howard of Variety criticized the film's lack of capitalization on its source material, "in favor of a generic conceit centered on freedom, preachy commentary on prejudice and a reductive, rote conflict between humankind and robots." IGN's A.A. Dowd gave the film a 4 out of 10, also critical of the film's handling of the novel, saying: "Leave it to the directors of Marvel's most overstuffed event pictures to bastardize a deeply lonely science fiction yarn into another expensive group hug and team-building comedy routine."

Brown's and Pratt's performances were also received negatively. Kevin Maher of The Sunday Times gave the film one star out of five. He questioned Brown's performances in her previous cinematic outings as well as The Electric State, left wondering if she was "profoundly ill-equipped" for big-screen acting. Comic Book Resources' C.M. Ramsburg came to a similar conclusion, explaining that despite the casting of Pratt and Brown, "their performances remain flat and one-dimensional as they portray characters without depth or substance", giving the film a 3 out of 10. Screen Rant's Alex Harrison found little to note about the film, other than "Millie Bobby Brown's look to echo Eleven and Chris Pratt's look to echo Star Lord".

Several critics thought that the film's reported $320 million budget was wasted. Sam Adams from Slate called the end product disastrous, saying the film joins "the list of the costliest films of all time". New York Post's Johnny Oleksinski noted the Russo brothers' directing efforts after Avengers: Endgame as "some of the worst and priciest movies of the past six years". He panned the film's lack of originality. Jared Rasic of Detroit Metro Times praised the film's special effects but panned the screenplay, calling the end product film "a garish, unfunny, Netflix original dumpster fire."

=== Accolades ===
Award	Date of ceremony	Category	Nominee(s)	Result	Ref.
Nickelodeon Kids' Choice Awards	June 21, 2025	Favorite Movie Actor	Chris Pratt	Nominated	
Nickelodeon Kids' Choice Awards	June 21, 2025	Favorite Movie Actress	Millie Bobby Brown	Nominated	
Golden Raspberry Awards	March 14, 2026	Worst Picture	The Electric State	Nominated	
Golden Raspberry Awards	March 14, 2026	Worst Director	The Russo Brothers	Nominated	
Golden Raspberry Awards	March 14, 2026	Worst Screenplay	Christopher Markus and Stephen McFeely	Nominated	

== Tie-in media ==
A video game based on the film, The Electric State: Kid Cosmo, was released on iOS and Android by Netflix Games on March 18, 2025. It follows Michelle and Christopher during their childhood as they navigate a mobile game featuring Cosmo. The game was developed in collaboration with AGBO and Buck Game.

== See also ==
- Tales from the Loop – A TV series adapted from another of Stålenhag's books
