= Simon Stålenhag =

Swedish artist and designer (born 1984)

- Stålenhag in 2016
- Born: 20 January 1984 (age 42); Mälaröarna, Stockholm county, Sweden
- Occupations: Artist; musician; designer
- Known for: Inspiring Tales from the Loop and The Electric State
- Website: simonstalenhag.se

Simon Stålenhag (born 20 January 1984) is a Swedish artist, musician, and designer specialising in retro-futuristic digital art. His work primarily focuses on nostalgic Swedish and American countryside environments, with retro sci-fi elements.

The settings of his artwork formed the basis for the 2020 Amazon television drama series Tales from the Loop. His graphic novel The Electric State was adapted into the 2025 Netflix film The Electric State.

== Artwork ==
Stålenhag grew up in Mälaröarna, a rural area near Stockholm, and began illustrating local landscapes at a young age. He was inspired by different artists, including Lars Jonsson. Stålenhag experimented with science fiction artwork after discovering concept artists such as Ralph McQuarrie and Syd Mead. Initially, this body of work was done as a side project, without any planning behind it. Thematically, his work often combines his childhood with themes from sci-fi movies, resulting in a typical Swedish landscape with a retrofuturistic bent. According to Stålenhag, this focus originates from his perceived lack of connection with adulthood, with the science fiction elements being added in part to draw audience attention and partly to influence the work's mood. These ideas result in a body of work that can feature giant robots and megastructures alongside regular Swedish items like Volvo and Saab vehicles.

As his work has evolved, Stålenhag has created a backstory for it, focused around a governmental underground facility. In parallel with the real-life decline of the Swedish welfare state, large machines slowly fail, and the eventual result of this remains a mystery. In a 2013 interview with The Verge, Stålenhag said, "The only difference in the world of my art and our world is that... ever since the early 20th century, attitudes and budgets were much more in favour of science and technology."

Outside of his usual canon, Stålenhag also drew 28 pictures of dinosaurs for the Swedish Museum of Natural History's prehistoric exhibits after he rediscovered his childhood interest in the creatures, and contacted the museum to see if he could do anything. In 2016, he followed this with pictures of hypothetical results of a rising ocean under climate change for Stockholm University's Resilience Centre. He also did some promotional artwork for the sci-fi video game No Man's Sky.

Stålenhag uses a Wacom tablet and computer for his work, which is designed to resemble oil painting. Initially, he attempted to use various physical media to mimic a more traditional style, including gouache. Even after switching to digital methods, he has stated that he puts "a lot of effort into making the digital brushes behave naturally and preserve a certain amount of 'handwriting' in the brush strokes". The majority of his work is based on pre-existing photographs that he takes; these are then used as a starting point for a number of rough sketches before the final work is completed.

=== Books ===
Most of Stålenhag's artwork was initially available online, before later being released for sale as prints. Since then, it has been turned into two narrative art books: Tales from the Loop (Ur Varselklotet in Swedish) in 2014 and Things from the Flood (Flodskörden in Swedish) in 2016. Both focus on the construction of a supermassive particle accelerator called the Loop.

Stålenhag covered the western United States in a third art book, The Electric State, which was crowdfunded via Kickstarter. It is centered around a teenage girl and her robotic companion traversing the fictional state of Pacifica in an attempt to find her long-lost younger brother. Simon & Schuster published the UK edition in September 2018, and Skybound Books published a North American edition the following month. The Electric State (the Simon & Schuster edition) was one out of six finalists for the Arthur C. Clarke Award in 2019. Also in 2019, the Skybound edition was shortlisted for the Art Book category of the Locus Award.

Stålenhag's fourth art book, The Labyrinth, was announced in late 2020. As with his previous books, a crowdfunding campaign was run on Kickstarter to fund its printing and distribution. Image Comics published the North American edition for wide release in November 2021.

In 2021, Stålenhag won the Kurd Laßwitz Award for Tales from the Loop.

In August 2024, Free League Publishing launched a Kickstarter page for Stålenhag's fifth book. Described as his "most personal work yet", Swedish Machines explores masculinity, sexuality, and time in an alternate version of Mälaröarna outside of Stockholm, Stålenhag's hometown.

== Adaptations ==
In 2016, a Kickstarter campaign was launched to fund a tabletop role-playing game called Tales from the Loop, based on the book of the same name. Set in the 1980s, in either the United States or Sweden, players roleplay as a group of teenagers dealing with the impact of the Loop; this focus on nostalgia and young protagonists meant multiple media outlets compared it to the TV series Stranger Things. Different classes of characters are equivalent to stereotypical childhood roles, for example, "Jock", "Bookworm", or "Computer Geek".

An English-language television series, Tales from the Loop, produced by Amazon Studios in conjunction with Fox 21 Television Studios, Indio Film, and 6th & Idaho Moving for Amazon Prime, was released in its entirety on 3 April 2020 and adapts elements from Stålenhag's narrative art books. The initial season comprises eight episodes of 50–57 minutes each. All screenplays were written by Nathaniel Halpern, while each episode had a unique director from a diverse pool, including Mark Romanek, Andrew Stanton, and Jodie Foster.

The movie rights for The Electric State were sold to the Russo brothers in 2017, and plans for an adaptation were confirmed in 2019. Producers for the film include It: Chapter One and Chapter Two creators Andy Muschietti and Barbara Muschietti. The film adaptation was released by Netflix on 14 March 2025.

== Other work ==
Stålenhag produced the 8-bit chiptune score for the Community episode "Digital Estate Planning".

As part of the crowdfunding campaign for The Electric State, Stålenhag produced and released an electronic music album with the same title for a backer goal. In 2018, he released his second album, Music for DOS, containing ambient music authored using old keyboards and the Impulse Tracker software package.

Additionally, Stålenhag has been involved in a variety of advertisements, films, and video games. This includes his work on the platform game Ripple Dot Zero, in collaboration with Tommy Salomonsson.
