= Tales from the Loop =

American science fiction drama TV series

- Genre: Drama; Science fiction
- Based on: Tales from the Loop by Simon Stålenhag
- Developed by: Nathaniel Halpern
- Written by: Nathaniel Halpern
- Starring: Rebecca Hall; Paul Schneider; Duncan Joiner; Daniel Zolghadri; Jonathan Pryce
- Composers: Philip Glass; Paul Leonard-Morgan
- Country of origin: United States
- Original language: English
- No. of seasons: 1
- No. of episodes: 8

Production
- Executive producers: Matt Reeves; Adam Kassan; Rafi Crohn; Nathaniel Halpern; Mark Romanek; Mattias Montero; Adam Berg; Samantha Taylor Pickett
- Running time: 50–57 minutes
- Production companies: Indio Film; 6th & Idaho; Fox 21 Television Studios; Amazon Studios

Original release
- Network: Amazon Prime Video
- Release: April 3, 2020

Tales from the Loop is an American science fiction drama television series developed and written by Nathaniel Halpern based on the art book of the same name by Swedish artist Simon Stålenhag. The eight-episode first season was released in its entirety on Amazon Prime Video on April 3, 2020.

== Series overview ==
Tales from the Loop follows the interconnected lives of the residents in the fictional town of Mercer, Ohio. Mercer is home to the Mercer Center for Experimental Physics, an underground facility known as the Loop. It is here that researchers attempt to "make the impossible possible".

== Cast and characters ==
=== Main ===
- Rebecca Hall as Loretta, the mother of Jakob and Cole. She works alongside her husband George as a physicist at the Loop.
  - Abby Ryder Fortson as Young Loretta
- Paul Schneider as George, the father of Jakob and Cole.
  - Emjay Anthony as Young George
- Duncan Joiner as Cole, the youngest son of Loretta and George.
  - Shane Carruth as Adult Cole
- Daniel Zolghadri as Jakob, the oldest son of Loretta and George.
- Jonathan Pryce as Russ, the founder of the Loop. He is also the father of George and the husband of Klara.

=== Recurring ===
- Jane Alexander as Klara, the wife of Russ and the mother of George.
- Tyler Barnhardt as Danny Jansson
- Ato Essandoh as Gaddis
- Nicole Law as May
- Danny Kang as Ethan
- Christin Park as Stacey
- Dan Bakkedahl as Ed
- Lauren Weedman as Kate
- Alessandra de Sa Pereira as Beth
- Leann Lei as Xiu
- Dominic Rains as Lucas
- Jon Kortajarena as Alex
- Brian Maillard as Kent
- Elektra Kilbey as Alma
- Stefanie Estes as Sarah

== Episodes ==
No.	Title	Directed by	Written by	Original release date
1	"Loop"	Mark Romanek	Nathaniel Halpern	April 3, 2020
A young girl named Loretta comes home from school one day to find her house has disappeared, as has her mother. In its place, she finds a small black rock that does not always follow gravity's rules. While searching the area, she meets Cole, a boy around her age who lives in the area. Together, they investigate the Loop where both their parents worked, but fail to find anything useful. At Cole's house, his mother realizes that Loretta is a younger version of herself displaced in time. She finds Loretta and together, they return the black stone to a massive orb inside of the Loop. Younger Loretta disappears, and Older Loretta comforts Cole, fearing she has not been the best mother.
2	"Transpose"	So Yong Kim	Nathaniel Halpern	April 3, 2020
Cole's older brother Jakob and his friend Danny discover a strange pod in the forest that allows them to switch bodies. They decide to live each other's lives for a day, where Jakob experiences Danny's distraught but freer life while Danny experiences Jakob's richer but more confining one. Danny persuades Jakob to wait another day, but after realizing that he will never have the opportunities that Jakob will, refuses to switch back. Jakob, confused and distraught, tries to switch back into his own body without Danny being present, with disastrous results. When Danny finds his body with no Jakob inside of it, he regretfully takes over Jakob's life while Danny's family take care of their son's empty body. Later that night, a robot visits Jakob's house, and Danny realizes that Jakob's consciousness was transferred into the robot. When approached by Danny, the robot runs away.
3	"Stasis"	Dearbhla Walsh	Nathaniel Halpern	April 3, 2020
May, Jakob's girlfriend, finds a strange device in a lake. While at a wedding, May befriends Ethan, a boy with a foot disability. Ethan helps May steal a component for the device, and she inserts it to activate the machine. May kisses Ethan, but she leaves and she finishes the machine which, when she turns it on, temporarily freezes time. They spend a month together, having fun, and eventually pronounce their love for one another. After finally deciding to resume time, May discovers that an integral component of the machine is broken. She and Ethan go looking for a replacement in the house where her mother is having an affair, something she was unaware of before. Distraught, she argues with Ethan, who then runs off and leaves the paused time. May fixes the machine and restarts time, where she tries to apologize to Ethan and they part ways.
4	"Echo Sphere"	Andrew Stanton	Nathaniel Halpern	April 3, 2020
Cole catches fireflies at his grandparents Russ and Klara's yard. The next day, Russ takes Cole to an old Loop project, a huge rusting "echo sphere". Russ informs Cole, George, and Klara that his doctor has predicted he does not have long to live. At the Loop, Russ tells Loretta that he is putting her in charge of the Loop and she accepts. Russ takes Cole on a drive for one last teachable moment. Russ arrives home and makes a foreshadowing comment to Klara. He goes to the bedroom and collapses. Jakob informs Cole that their grandfather is in the hospital. Determined that the Loop can save Russ, Cole breaks into the underground complex, but gets caught by Loretta as he’s about to touch the mysterious sphere at the heart of the Loop. After initially hesitating, George takes Cole to see Russ in the hospital. Russ is delusional, which shocks Cole. Later at the hospital, Russ, in his final moments, dreams of merging with the underground sphere. Cole returns to the echo sphere alone. He shouts into it again, and with each echo, he envisions the decades of his life passing by. Finally, he sees the sphere filled with fireflies.
5	"Control"	Tim Mielants	Nathaniel Halpern	April 3, 2020
Danny is in a comatose state after having his consciousness transferred out of his body. His father, Ed, becomes more and more paranoid that something is stalking his family. Ed purchases a robot for protection and patrols his home at night with it in order to keep his daughter and wife safe. The fusebox to the house malfunctions and they do not have enough money to replace it due to Danny's hospital bills and the new robot. It is revealed that the person sneaking onto the property is Danny, whose consciousness was transferred into Jakob's body. He had been coming over to visit his sister, Beth. Ed's wife and daughter eventually leave to stay with family, leaving Ed to guard the property at night. Ed eventually realizes that he cannot keep his family safe forever and sells the robot. He uses the money to repair the fusebox. He calls his wife and daughter and they return home.
6	"Parallel"	Charlie McDowell	Nathaniel Halpern	April 3, 2020
A guard for the Loop, Gaddis, has the photo of a man he does not know. He later meets a man named Kent at a bar, and the acquaintance goes horribly wrong. The next day, Gaddis goes into a field and tries to fix a tractor, to no avail. Gaddis heads home only to find the man from the photo playing piano in his house. An alternative version of Gaddis lives with him there. The two Gaddises form a friendship and attempt to use the tractor to send the original Gaddis back to his own universe. The tractor will not start, and The Loop has been shut down in this parallel universe, so there is no way for him to return home. Forced to stay hidden from everyone, Original Gaddis becomes jealous of Alternative Gaddis and Alex, the man from the photo. Original Gaddis starts flirting with Alex, and the two eventually kiss. Original Gaddis confesses his love to Alex only to be rejected. Angry, Alternative Gaddis confronts Original Gaddis, who leaves, walks to a diner and comes into contact with Alternative Kent. The two hit it off and agree to go bird watching together.
7	"Enemies"	Ti West	Nathaniel Halpern	April 3, 2020
The episode starts in a flashback to George's childhood; George is with his friends working on a radio, at the movies, and playing in the woods. They talk about an old story of a monster from the Loop who lives on an island. They decide to take a boat to the island and George's two friends leave George on the island as a prank. There, his arm is bitten by a snake and he meets the robot monster from the story. After he is rescued, his arm is amputated and replaced with a robotic arm. Then, in the present, adult George has the same robotic arm. He talks to his mother, who tells him the monster was a creation of his father's and he put it on the island for its own safety. At the end of the episode George returns to the island to see the robot again, where they seem to recognize each other.
8	"Home"	Jodie Foster	Nathaniel Halpern	April 3, 2020
Cole misses his brother, who has moved to an apartment closer to the Loop. He goes to visit his brother and he learns that his brother is actually Danny, stuck in Jakob's body. He also learns his brother's consciousness is in the blue robot. He finds the robot and wants to bring him to his mother to help. In the woods, Jakob dies after fighting with another robot, and Cole has to leave him. He eventually leaves the woods, crossing a stream in the woods and unknowingly jumping forward in time several decades. He finds his mother as an old woman. She explains they have been looking for him for many years and his grandmother and father have died, Jakob (Danny) has married and had kids. Cole also learns that his teacher, who had taught his older brother and parents, is the second generation of human-like robots (androids), following the first generation of robot like the one from Episode 7. The episode ends many years later when an adult Cole is visiting his childhood home with his new family.

== Production ==
=== Background ===
Tales from the Loop is based on the 2014 narrative art book of the same name by Swedish artist Simon Stålenhag; also drawing inspiration from the fact Stålenhag never fully explains what the science fiction objects he depicts do or where they come from.

=== Development ===
On July 17, 2018, it was announced that Amazon had given the production a series order for a first season consisting of eight episodes. Executive producers include Matt Reeves, Adam Kassan, Rafi Crohn, Nathaniel Halpern, Mark Romanek, Mattias Montero, Adam Berg, and Samantha Taylor Pickett. Halpern serves as showrunner and Romanek directed the pilot episode. Production companies involved with the series include 6th & Idaho, Indio, Amazon Studios, and Fox 21 Television Studios. The first season was released in its entirety on April 3, 2020. A first trailer was released on February that year.

Writer and showrunner Nathaniel Halpern drew inspiration from the short story cycle Winesburg, Ohio by Sherwood Anderson; its themes of loneliness and isolation, and its focus on small town characters. Executive producer and director Mark Romanek drew inspiration from the Dekalog, the 10-part series of television films by Krzysztof Kieślowski. Other directors cited to influence the production include Ingmar Bergman, Yasujirō Ozu, and Andrei Tarkovsky.

=== Filming ===
The team, headed by visual effects producer Andrea Knoll, attempted to preserve the "painterly feeling" of Stålenhag's artwork, earning them an Emmy nomination for Outstanding Special Visual Effects in a Supporting Role. In his attempts to "crack the code" of Stålenhag, cinematographer Jeff Cronenweth chose to shoot night scenes during dusk instead.

== Reception ==
=== Critical response ===
On Rotten Tomatoes, season one has an approval rating of 87% based on 68 reviews, with an average rating of 7.3/10. The website's critical consensus reads: "Though the show around them burns a bit too slowly, Tales from the Loop beautifully transposes Simon Stålenhag's paintings into moving art and provides a welcome dose of warmth and humanity with its sci-fi." On Metacritic, season one has a score of 68/100 based on reviews from 15 critics.

David Baird from The B.C. Catholic characterizes the series as "a set of loosely interrelated meditations upon ephemerality, the impact of technology, and human vulnerability infused with a mild science fiction savour" and considers it "a beguiling fusion of forward-looking nostalgia". Joshua Thomas from The Michigan Daily simply considers it "superb sci-fi"; "exactly what good sci-fi should look like." Writing for Firstpost, Prahlad Srihari thinks its "wide shots, the symmetrical frames, and the play of light and space all do justice to Stålenhag's retrofuturistic vision". According to The Verge's Joshua Rivera, "Tales from the Loop is so pretty it breaks your heart." Writing for /Film, Hoai-Tran Bui thinks the show explores "universal elements of grief, aging, parenthood, loneliness, and love" but also that it "often toes the line between beguiling and boring". Polygon's Charlie Hall, meanwhile, was left "feeling uneasy and confused".

Writing for Fortean Times, Steve Toase commented, "A TV show based on a series of static, albeit evocative, paintings would be easy to get wrong, but not here. The cinematography is stunning, and the succession of beautiful images will make your heart soar." Despite each episode having a different director, Toase noted, "the series emerges as a coherent whole in which main characters from one episode become background characters in others, and events in one story have consequences further down the line." Despite the technological angle, Toase thought, "These are incredibly human stories that integrate the technological without pivoting away from the emotional." Toase concluded by giving this series a rating of 5 out of 5, saying, "Tales from the Loop will break your heart several times over, while showing the silence of loss and the grief and beauty of change that cannot be reversed."

=== Awards and nominations ===
Association	Category	Recipient	Results	Ref
Primetime Emmy Awards	Outstanding Special Visual Effects in a Supporting Role	Andrea Knoll, Ashley Bernes, Eduardo Anton, Julien Hery, Laurent Pancaccini, Andrew Kowbell, Alan Scott, David Piombino, Rajesh Kaushik (For "Loop")	Nominated	
Primetime Emmy Awards	Outstanding Cinematography for a Single-Camera Series (One Hour)	Jeff Cronenweth (For "Loop")	Nominated	
Visual Effects Society Awards	Outstanding Effects Simulations in an Episode, Commercial, or Real-Time Project	Dominik Kirouac, Gaël Chopin, Sylvain Nouveau, Laurent Pancaccini (For "Loretta's House")	Nominated	

== See also ==
- The Electric State
