= The Electric State =

2018 graphic novel by Simon Stålenhag

- Author: Simon Stålenhag
- Original title: Passagen
- Genre: Dystopian science fiction
- Published: 25 September 2018 (Skybound Books) (English)
- Publication date: 25 September 2018
- ISBN: 978-1-5011-8141-2

The Electric State (Swedish: Passagen, lit. 'The Passage') is a 2018 dystopian science fiction illustrated novel by Swedish artist Simon Stålenhag. Set in an alternate technologically ravaged 1990s, it follows a teenage girl and her robot on a journey to the West Coast of the United States in search of her long-lost brother.

In 2017, the Russo brothers acquired film rights to the book. They directed and produced a film adaptation for Netflix, released in 2025. Tabletop game publisher Free League Publishing ran a successful Kickstarter for a game version of the book in 2023, releasing the game in 2025.

== Premise ==
The book is told through a series of paragraphs linked to large illustrations, which depict the landscape and characters, often featuring monolithic relics or pieces of technology. The main story follows Michelle, a teenage orphan traveling to the West Coast with a robot companion, Skip, to find her long-lost brother. Flashbacks gradually reveal Michelle's past and the reason for her separation.

Intertwined with Michelle's journey are details of the novel's setting, Pacifica (later revealed to be California) is portrayed as a hyper-consumerist society in decline, with the vast majority of the population using brain-computer interfaces called Neurocasters, originally used as military interfaces to control immense combat drones in a second civil war. They later enter the civilian market, where they are used to escape the trauma of the war and act as an interface for virtual reality networks. Technological addiction has become a widespread issue, leading to a widespread breakdown of law and order through which Michelle must travel.

The Desert

The book opens on Michelle and Skip travelling on foot through the Mojave Desert in southeastern Pacifica, hauling a kayak. They encounter scattered articles of clothing, which lead them to an abandoned Oldsmobile and its deceased owners, who appear to have died and decomposed while preoccupied by their Neurocasters. After taking the owners' belongings, Michelle comandeers the vehicle, and reveals her destination as the Pacific coast.

Meanwhile, Walter, a government agent tasked with locating Christopher, Michelle's brother, for an undisclosed purpose, is introduced. He contemplates the nature of the human mind, recalling his time in the war and his personal revelation of the physicality of human nature when his friend was fatally shot.

Michelle and Skip journey through a dust storm and reach the town of Mojave, where citizens are desperately stocking up on dwindling groceries under the supervision of paramilitary soldiers. They leave and continue driving through the desert as Michelle recalls her foster parents Ted and Birgitte, and the road trip that they took through the same region. She also notes her violent hatred for Birgitte, and her indifference to her death. She reminisces her time at Summerglade, a rehabilitation camp, where she meets her romantic interest, Amanda.

The Mountains

Michelle reaches the Sierra Nevada, and continues westward as she remembers her time in the care of her grandfather in the city of Kingston. She alludes to the fact that she is physically unable to use a Neurocaster. It is revealed that her grandfather died due to respiratory illness caused by the air pollution emitted by the city's drone shipyard. Michelle recalls the beginning of the decline of society, and tells how her foster parents became increasingly addicted to the Neurocaster technology, which consumed their time and sanity, and even altered the function of their bodies.

Walter, travelling by car in pursuit of the duo, reveals the theory that all of the users of the Neurocaster network's minds merged through their constant connection to form a hive mind or higher conscience called the Intercerebral Intelligence. This nonphysical entity is what he believes influences the reproductive cycles of users, and was responsible for the vast number of stillbirths by veterans of the war, who had used the technology.

The Central Valley

Michelle and Skip enter the Central Valley, where they stop at a motel in Martell. Michelle reveals that her foster mother, Birgitte, had drowned while wearing her Neurocaster in a pool. This led to the mental decline of her foster father, Ted, who eventually remained in his Neurocaster until his death.

The Coast

Michelle and Skip reach the coast, and begin to near their destination of Cape Victory (the fictional equivalent of Point Reyes, California.) As she drives, Michelle notices the wrecks of multiple gigantic combat drones, which causes her to recall her mother, a veteran of the civil war in which she piloted similar drones. She remembers how she and her mother had lived in poverty, and were largely transient. Her mother suffered health complications from the mental effects of piloting the drones through the neural interface; as such, her younger brother, Christopher, was born with numerous mental disorders. She also remembers Amanda moving away, and her return after seemingly undergoing some form of conversion therapy, which caused her to become distant from Michelle. When she arrives at Cape Victory, she camps in her car.

When Michelle wakes up, she sees a massive, monstrous improvised machine surrounded by a crowd of people wearing Neurocasters. The crowd is gathered who around a minivan into which the machines cables have intruded; Michelle sees the naked torso of a woman in the throes of sexual pleasure. After a few minutes the cables withdraw from the van, and the machine and the crowd disappear into the mist. A few moments later, Michelle sees a woman emerge from the minivan, compose herself, and leave the parking lot

Walter, now very near to Michelle and Skip, recounts a tale from his experience in the war, in which he encountered soldiers who had been influenced by the Intercerebral Intelligence to reproduce in order to manifest a physical form for the conscience. He notes that the Intercerebral Intelligence created at least one successful pregnancy during the war, producing a child that bore a nonhuman genome, and an organization called the Convergence seeks to spread this genome. It is revealed that the sole child of the intelligence, Christopher, must be found in order to combat the Intercerebral Intelligence. He views Christopher as a threat, and likely intends to kill him.

Michelle locates Christopher, who has been piloting her drone companion through a Neurocaster, in a house in the town of Point Linden, on the tip of Cape Victory. Walter approaches the house, but is killed by a monstrous drone. Michelle takes Christopher to a nearby convenience store, where she worries that, like Birgitte, Christopher will die if she removes his Neurocaster.

The Sea

Michelle then takes him and the car, with her kayak in tow, to the ocean. She eventually did remove the Neurocaster, which sits abandoned alongside the drone on the beach. The kayak is nowhere to be seen. Michelle and Christopher's fates are unclear, but it appears as though Michelle has embarked on the kayak into the ocean.

== Reception ==
Critics at NPR and New York Journal of Books gave positive reviews.

It received starred reviews from both Booklist and Publishers Weekly, where it was praised for the illustrations, writing, and structure of the graphic novel.

NPR named it one of the best books of 2018.
