= 63rd Tony Awards =

2009 US theatrical awards ceremony

- 63rd Tony Awards poster
- Date: June 7, 2009
- Location: Radio City Music Hall
- Hosted by: Neil Patrick Harris

Highlights
- Most wins: Billy Elliot the Musical (10)
- Most nominations: Billy Elliot the Musical (15)
- Website: tonyawards.com

Television/radio coverage
- Network: CBS
- Viewership: 7.4 million
- Produced by: Ricky Kirshner; Glenn Weiss
- Directed by: Glenn Weiss

The 63rd Annual Tony Awards, which recognized Broadway productions of the 2008-2009 season, were presented on June 7, 2009 at Radio City Music Hall in New York City. The ceremony was broadcast by CBS, hosted by Neil Patrick Harris.

The cut-off date for eligibility for the awards was April 30, 2009. Nominations were announced on May 5, 2009 by Cynthia Nixon and Lin-Manuel Miranda. Of the musicals, Billy Elliot the Musical received 15 nominations, every one that it was eligible for, which tied for the most received by any Broadway production until this record was surpassed by Hamilton (16), followed by the Pulitzer Prize for Drama winner Next to Normal with eleven. Among the nominees for Best Revival of a Musical, Hair had the most nominations, with eight. Of the plays, the revivals Mary Stuart and The Norman Conquests tied for the most nominations, with seven each. All four stars of God of Carnage were nominated, as was the play itself. Billy Elliot won 10 awards, the most of the night, including Best Musical. Next to Normal and God of Carnage each won three.

The Isabelle Stevenson Award, a non-competitive award named after the late president of the American Theatre Wing, was presented for the first time. Its purpose is to recognize individuals from the theatre community who have volunteered time to one or more humanitarian, social service, or charitable organizations. The first recipient of this honor was Phyllis Newman. This was the first non-competitive category to be introduced since the Tony Honors for Excellence in the Theatre was established in 1990.

The broadcast won the 2009 Primetime Emmy Award for Outstanding Special Class Programs. The telecast also was nominated in the category of Outstanding Art Direction for Variety, Music or Nonfiction Programming.

== Eligibility ==
Shows that opened on Broadway during the 2008–09 season before May 1, 2009 are eligible.

Original plays

- The American Plan
- Dividing the Estate
- God of Carnage
- Impressionism
- Irena's Vow
- Reasons to Be Pretty
- 33 Variations
- To Be or Not to Be

Original musicals

- Billy Elliot the Musical
- Next to Normal
- 9 to 5
- Rock of Ages
- Shrek The Musical
- The Story of My Life
- A Tale of Two Cities
- 13
- title of show
- White Christmas

Play revivals

- Accent on Youth
- All My Sons
- American Buffalo
- Blithe Spirit
- Desire Under the Elms
- Equus
- Exit the King
- Hedda Gabler
- Joe Turner's Come and Gone
- Mary Stuart
- A Man for All Seasons
- The Norman Conquests
- The Philanthropist
- The Seagull
- Speed-the-Plow
- Waiting for Godot

Musical revivals

- Guys and Dolls
- Hair
- Pal Joey
- West Side Story

== Pre-telecast events ==
The Visa Signature Tony Awards Preview Concert featured performers from the musicals Guys and Dolls, Hair, West Side Story, 9 to 5; Billy Elliot the Musical, Next to Normal, Rock of Ages, and Shrek The Musical. The concert was televised on various CBS stations, and in New York City on May 30. Newscaster Harry Smith from The Early Show hosted the special.

The red-carpet arrivals and pre-Tony telecast awards (Creative Arts Awards) were webcast on TonyAwards.com. A Creative Arts Awards (CAA) ceremony, hosted by Laura Benanti and Brian Stokes Mitchell, was held prior to the main ceremony. The CAA presented the awards for orchestrations and scenery, costume, lighting and sound design.

== Presenters ==
Presenters included Lucie Arnaz, Kate Burton, Kristin Chenoweth, Jeff Daniels, Hope Davis, Edie Falco, Will Ferrell, Carrie Fisher, Jane Fonda, Hallie Foote, James Gandolfini, Lauren Graham, Colin Hanks, Marcia Gay Harden, Anne Hathaway, Jessica Lange, Frank Langella, Angela Lansbury, Audra McDonald, David Hyde Pierce, Piper Perabo, Oliver Platt, Susan Sarandon, John Stamos and Chandra Wilson.

== Performances ==
Performances included scenes from nine Broadway musicals: Billy Elliot the Musical (with an appearance by Elton John); Guys and Dolls, with Tituss Burgess and company performing "Sit Down, You're Rockin' the Boat" (at the start of the performance, Burgess's microphone was not working, so a stagehand ran up to him to give him a handheld); Hair, with the company performing the title song and "Let the Sunshine In"; Next to Normal, with Alice Ripley, J. Robert Spencer, and Aaron Tveit performing "You Don't Know/I Am The One"; Pal Joey, represented by Stockard Channing singing a few lines from "Bewitched, Bothered, and Bewildered" during the opening segment; Rock of Ages, with Constantine Maroulis and fellow cast members singing "Don't Stop Believin'"; Shrek the Musical, with the company performing "What's Up, Duloc"; West Side Story, with the company performing the Dance At The Gym; and 9 to 5, with Dolly Parton joining the cast to sing the title tune. Cast members from national touring companies of three musicals also appeared: The lead character from four Jersey Boys casts (Joseph Leo Bwarie (Toronto), Rick Faugno (Las Vegas), Courter Simmons (national tour) and Dominic Scaglione, Jr. (Chicago) sang together with Jarrod Spector from the Broadway cast; Legally Blonde spotlighted Becky Gulsvig; and Michelle Dawson, Kittra Wynn Coomer and Rachel Tyler from the national tour of Mamma Mia! sang "Dancing Queen" with fellow cast members.

Performers from the nominated Best Plays category presented brief clips of those plays, which included God of Carnage, 33 Variations, Dividing the Estate and Reasons to Be Pretty.

Liza Minnelli performed in the opening sequence, and rock icon Bret Michaels and his band Poison joined the cast of Rock of Ages during their segment in the opening number, performing the band's 1988 Top Ten hit "Nothin' but a Good Time". While exiting the stage, Michaels was struck in the head by a descending set and knocked to the floor. He suffered a fractured nose and a split lip that required three stitches. He subsequently sued the event's organizers, claiming that the collision led to his 2010 brain hemorrhage. The suit was settled in May 2012 for an undisclosed amount.

Neil Patrick Harris ended the show with a pastiche of "Tonight" from West Side Story and "Luck Be a Lady" from Guys and Dolls, with lyrics re-written by Marc Shaiman and Scott Wittman that recapped the awards.

== Competitive awards ==
Winners in bold.

Best Play	Best Musical
**God of Carnage – Yasmina Reza**; Dividing the Estate – Horton Foote; Reasons to Be Pretty – Neil LaBute; 33 Variations – Moisés Kaufman	**Billy Elliot the Musical**; Next to Normal; Rock of Ages; Shrek The Musical
Best Revival of a Play	Best Revival of a Musical
**The Norman Conquests**; Joe Turner's Come and Gone; Mary Stuart; Waiting for Godot	**Hair**; Guys and Dolls; Pal Joey; West Side Story
Best Performance by a Leading Actor in a Play	Best Performance by a Leading Actress in a Play
**Geoffrey Rush – Exit the King as King Berenger**; Jeff Daniels – God of Carnage as Alan; Raúl Esparza – Speed-the-Plow as Charlie Fox; James Gandolfini – God of Carnage as Michael; Thomas Sadoski – Reasons to Be Pretty as Greg	**Marcia Gay Harden – God of Carnage as Veronica**; Hope Davis – God of Carnage as Annette; Jane Fonda – 33 Variations as Katherine Brandt; Janet McTeer – Mary Stuart as Mary Stuart; Harriet Walter – Mary Stuart as Elizabeth I
Best Performance by a Leading Actor in a Musical	Best Performance by a Leading Actress in a Musical
**David Alvarez, Trent Kowalik, and Kiril Kulish – Billy Elliot the Musical as Billy Elliot**; Gavin Creel – Hair as Claude Hooper Bukowski; Brian d'Arcy James – Shrek The Musical as Shrek; Constantine Maroulis – Rock of Ages as Drew; J. Robert Spencer – Next to Normal as Dan	**Alice Ripley – Next to Normal as Diana Goodman**; Stockard Channing – Pal Joey as Vera Simpson; Sutton Foster – Shrek The Musical as Princess Fiona; Allison Janney – 9 to 5 as Violet Newstead; Josefina Scaglione – West Side Story as Maria
Best Performance by a Featured Actor in a Play	Best Performance by a Featured Actress in a Play
**Roger Robinson – Joe Turner's Come and Gone as Bynum Walker**; John Glover – Waiting for Godot as Lucky; Zach Grenier – 33 Variations as Beethoven; Stephen Mangan – The Norman Conquests as Norman; Paul Ritter – The Norman Conquests as Reg	**Angela Lansbury** – **Blithe Spirit as Madame Arcati**; Hallie Foote – Dividing the Estate as Mary Jo; Jessica Hynes – The Norman Conquests as Annie; Marin Ireland – Reasons to Be Pretty as Steph; Amanda Root – The Norman Conquests as Sarah
Best Performance by a Featured Actor in a Musical	Best Performance by a Featured Actress in a Musical
**Gregory Jbara – Billy Elliot the Musical as Dad**; David Bologna – Billy Elliot the Musical as Michael Caffrey; Marc Kudisch – 9 to 5 as Franklin Hart Jr.; Christopher Sieber – Shrek The Musical as Lord Farquaad; Will Swenson – Hair as George Berger	**Karen Olivo – West Side Story as Anita**; Jennifer Damiano – Next to Normal as Natalie Goodman; Haydn Gwynne – Billy Elliot the Musical as Ms. Wilkinson; Martha Plimpton – Pal Joey as Gladys Bumps; Carole Shelley – Billy Elliot the Musical as Grandma
Best Book of a Musical	Best Original Score (Music and/or Lyrics) Written for the Theatre
**Lee Hall – Billy Elliot the Musical**; Brian Yorkey – Next to Normal; David Lindsay-Abaire – Shrek The Musical; Hunter Bell – [title of show]	**Next to Normal – Tom Kitt (music) and Brian Yorkey (lyrics)**; Billy Elliot the Musical – Elton John (music) and Lee Hall (lyrics); 9 to 5 – Dolly Parton (music and lyrics); Shrek The Musical – Jeanine Tesori (music) and David Lindsay-Abaire (lyrics)
Best Scenic Design of a Play	Best Scenic Design of a Musical
**Derek McLane – 33 Variations**; Dale Ferguson – Exit the King; Rob Howell – The Norman Conquests; Michael Yeargan – Joe Turner's Come and Gone	**Ian MacNeil – Billy Elliot the Musical**; Robert Brill – Guys and Dolls; Scott Pask – Pal Joey; Mark Wendland – Next to Normal
Best Costume Design of a Play	Best Costume Design of a Musical
**Anthony Ward – Mary Stuart**; Dale Ferguson – Exit the King; Jane Greenwood – Waiting for Godot; Martin Pakledinaz – Blithe Spirit	**Tim Hatley – Shrek The Musical**; Gregory Gale – Rock of Ages; Nicky Gillibrand – Billy Elliot the Musical; Michael McDonald – Hair
Best Lighting Design of a Play	Best Lighting Design of a Musical
**Brian MacDevitt – Joe Turner's Come and Gone**; David Hersey – Equus; David Lander – 33 Variations; Hugh Vanstone – Mary Stuart	**Rick Fisher – Billy Elliot the Musical**; Kevin Adams – Hair; Kevin Adams – Next to Normal; Howell Binkley – West Side Story
Best Sound Design of a Play	Best Sound Design of a Musical
**Gregory Clarke – Equus**; Paul Arditti – Mary Stuart; Russell Goldsmith – Exit the King; Scott Lehrer and Leon Rothenberg – Joe Turner's Come and Gone	**Paul Arditti – Billy Elliot the Musical**; Acme Sound Partners – Hair; Peter Hylenski – Rock of Ages; Brian Ronan – Next to Normal
Best Direction of a Play	Best Direction of a Musical
**Matthew Warchus – God of Carnage**; Phyllida Lloyd – Mary Stuart; Bartlett Sher – Joe Turner's Come and Gone; Matthew Warchus – The Norman Conquests	**Stephen Daldry – Billy Elliot the Musical**; Michael Greif – Next to Normal; Kristin Hanggi – Rock of Ages; Diane Paulus – Hair
Best Choreography	Best Orchestrations
**Peter Darling – Billy Elliot the Musical**; Karole Armitage – Hair; Andy Blankenbuehler – 9 to 5; Randy Skinner – Irving Berlin's White Christmas	**Martin Koch – Billy Elliot the Musical** (tie); **Michael Starobin and Tom Kitt – Next to Normal** (tie); Larry Blank – Irving Berlin's White Christmas; Danny Troob and John Clancy – Shrek The Musical
Best Special Theatrical Event
**Liza's at The Palace....**; Slava's Snowshow; Soul of Shaolin; You're Welcome America - A Final Night with George W. Bush

== In Memoriam ==
Bebe Neuwirth introduced a special number to honor those who died during the past theatre season. The Broadway Inspirational Voices and orchestra performed "What I Did for Love" from A Chorus Line. Broadway theatres dimmed their lights in memoriam, as well. Among those remembered were:

- Natasha Richardson
- Gerald Schoenfeld
- Harold Pinter
- Luther Davis
- Estelle Getty
- Dale Wasserman
- A. Larry Haines
- Edie Adams
- Bruce Adler
- Horton Foote
- James Whitmore
- Sydney Chaplin
- Clive Barnes
- Marilyn Cooper
- Tom O'Horgan
- Bea Arthur
- Ron Silver
- Robert Prosky
- Roy Somlyo
- Robert Anderson
- Lee Solters
- Pat Hingle
- Irving Cheskin
- Anna Manahan
- Sam Cohn
- George Furth
- Eartha Kitt
- Hugh Leonard
- Rodger McFarlane
- William Gibson
- Tharon Musser
- Paul Sills
- Lawrence Miller
- Paul Newman

== Non-competitive awards ==
- Tony Award for Lifetime Achievement in the Theatre – Jerry Herman
- Regional Theatre Tony Award – Signature Theatre, Arlington, Virginia
- Isabelle Stevenson Award – Phyllis Newman
- Tony Honors for Excellence in Theatre – Press Agent Shirley Herz

== Multiple nominations and awards ==
These productions had multiple nominations:

- 15 nominations: Billy Elliot the Musical
- 11 nominations: Next to Normal
- 8 nominations: Hair & Shrek The Musical
- 7 nominations: Mary Stuart & The Norman Conquests
- 6 nominations: God of Carnage & Joe Turner's Come and Gone
- 5 nominations: Rock of Ages & 33 Variations
- 4 nominations: Exit the King, 9 to 5, Pal Joey & West Side Story
- 3 nominations: Reasons to Be Pretty & Waiting for Godot
- 2 nominations: Blithe Spirit, Dividing the Estate, Equus, Guys and Dolls & White Christmas

The following productions received multiple awards.

- 10 wins: Billy Elliot the Musical
- 3 wins: God of Carnage & Next to Normal
- 2 wins: Joe Turner's Come and Gone

== See also ==
- Drama Desk Awards
- 2009 Laurence Olivier Awards – equivalent awards for West End theatre productions
- Obie Award
- New York Drama Critics' Circle
- Theatre World Award
- Lucille Lortel Awards
