= Rui Rita =

American lighting designer

Rui Rita is an American theatre lighting designer based in New York City. He won the Obie Award in 2005 and is known for his work both on Broadway and off-Broadway.

== Career ==
=== Broadway ===
Year	Show	Theater
2014	The Velocity of Autumn	Booth Theatre
2013	The Trip to Bountiful	Stephen Sondheim Theatre
2010	Present Laughter	American Airlines Theatre
2008	Dividing the Estate	Booth Theatre
2007	Old Acquaintance	American Airlines Theatre
2003	Enchanted April	Belasco Theatre
1999	The Price	Royale Theater
1997	A Thousand Clowns	Criterion Center Stage Right

=== Off-Broadway ===
Year	Show	Theater
2018	Paradise Blue	Pershing Square Signature Center The Romulus Linney Courtyard Theatre
2016	Skeleton Crew	Linda Gross Theater
2014	Just Jim Dale	Laura Pels Theatre
2014	The Happiest Song Plays Last	Second Stage Theater
2013	The Old Friends	Pershing Square Signature Center Irene Diamond Stage
2013	The Mound Builders	Pershing Square Signature Center The Romulus Linney Courtyard Theatre
2013	Talley's Folly	Laura Pels Theatre
2012	The Piano Lesson	Pershing Square Signature Center Irene Diamond Stage
2011	The Milk Train Doesn't Stop Here Anymore	Laura Pels Theatre
2010	The Orphans' Home Cycle Part III	Peter Norton Space
2009	The Orphans' Home Cycle Part II	Peter Norton Space
2009	The Orphans' Home Cycle Part I	Peter Norton Space
2009	The Torch-Bearers	Williamstown Theatre Festival
2009	Nightingale	New York City Center-Stage I
2007	Dividing the Estate	59E59 Theater A
2006	All's Well That Ends Well	The Duke on 42nd Street
2005	Moonlight and Magnolias	New York City Center-Stage I
2004	The Day Emily Married	59E59 Theater A
2004	Engaged	Lucille Lortel Theatre
2004	Big Bill	Mitzi E. Newhouse Theater
2002	Endpapers	Variety Arts Theatre
2002	The Carpetbagger's Children	Mitzi E. Newhouse Theater
2001	Crimes of the Heart	Second Stage Theater
1999	Dinner with Friends	Variety Arts Theatre
1999	Far East	Mitzi E. Newhouse Theater
1997	Secrets Every Smart Traveler Should Know	Triad Theater
1997	Antony and Cleopatra	Public Theater/Anspacher Theater
1994	Vita & Virginia	Union Square Theatre

=== Regional ===
Rita continues to work regionally, including accruing over 40 production credits at Williamstown Theater Festival.

== Awards and nominations ==
Year	Award	Show	Result
2005	Obie Award for Outstanding Lighting Design	Engaged	Won
2010	Henry Hewes Design Award for Notable Effects	The Orphans' Home Cycle Part I-III	Won
2010	Henry Hewes Design Award for Lighting Design	The Orphans' Home Cycle Part I-III	Nominated
2010	Lucille Lortel Award for Lighting Design	The Orphans' Home Cycle Part I-III	Nominated
2013	Henry Hewes Design Award for Lighting Design	Talley's Folley	Nominated
2013	Henry Hewes Design Award for Lighting Design	The Piano Lesson	Nominated
2013	AUDELCO Award, Lighting Design	The Piano Lesson	Won
2013	Lucille Lortel Award for Lighting Design	The Piano Lesson	Nominated
