= Benjamin Waisbren =

American film producer

Benjamin Waisbren is an American film producer, who co-founded Virtual Studios in 2005, a studio that was a film financier, distribution and production company, he worked for the company until 2008, it was closed in 2009

== Selected filmography ==
Year	Title	Notes
2005	Duane Hopwood	executive producer (uncredited)
2006	V for Vendetta	executive producer
2006	Poseidon	executive producer
2006	The Good German	executive producer
2006	Blood Diamond	executive producer
2007	300	executive producer
2007	First Born	executive producer
2007	Next	executive producer
2007	Gardener of Eden	executive producer
2007	Nancy Drew	executive producer
2007	The Assassination of Jesse James by the Coward Robert Ford	executive producer
2008	Bangkok Dangerous	executive producer
2011	Hall Pass	producer
2014	22 Jump Street	executive producer
2014	Think Like a Man Too	executive producer
2014	Deliver Us from Evil	executive producer
2014	Sex Tape	executive producer
2014	The Equalizer	executive producer
2014	Fury	executive producer
2014	The Interview	executive producer
2015	The Wedding Ringer	executive producer
2015	Chappie	executive producer
2015	Paul Blart: Mall Cop 2	executive producer
2015	Aloha	executive producer
2015	Pixels	executive producer
2015	Ricki and the Flash	executive producer
2015	Hotel Transylvania 2	executive producer
2015	The Walk	executive producer
2015	Goosebumps	executive producer
2015	Freaks of Nature	executive producer
2015	The Night Before	executive producer
2015	Concussion	executive producer
2016	The 5th Wave	executive producer
2016	Grimsby	executive producer
2016	Money Monster	executive producer
2016	The Magnificent Seven	executive producer
2016	Inferno	executive producer
2016	Billy Lynn's Long Halftime Walk	executive producer
2016	Passengers	executive producer
2017	Underworld: Blood Wars	executive producer
2017	Smurfs: The Lost Village	executive producer
2017	The Emoji Movie	executive producer
