= Lily Dale (film) =

1996 film directed by Peter Masterson

- Genre: Drama
- Based on: Lily Dale by Horton Foote
- Written by: Horton Foote
- Directed by: Peter Masterson
- Starring: Mary Stuart Masterson; Sam Shepard; Stockard Channing; Tim Guinee
- Music by: Peter Melnick
- Country of origin: United States
- Original language: English

Production
- Executive producers: John Thomas Lenox; Irwin Meyer; Linda Curran Wexelblatt
- Producers: Peter Crane; Hallie Foote
- Cinematography: Don E. FauntLeRoy
- Editor: Michael N. Knue
- Running time: 98 minutes
- Production companies: Producers Entertainment Group; Showtime/Hallmark Entertainment

Original release
- Network: Showtime
- Release: June 9, 1996

Lily Dale is a 1996 American drama television film directed by Peter Masterson and adapted by Horton Foote from his like-named play (the third in his 9-part Orphans' Home Cycle), which debuted Off-Broadway in 1986. It stars Mary Stuart Masterson, Sam Shepard, Stockard Channing, and Tim Guinee, and aired on Showtime on June 9, 1996.

== Plot ==
Set in 1910 in Texas, the story concerns 19-year-old Horace Robedaux (a character modeled on the playwright's father), who, following a roughly seven-year exile, is invited by his widowed and remarried mother, Corella Davenport, to visit her and his younger sister, Lily Dale, at their home in Houston while Mr. Davenport is away on business. (As to what had brought about that 7-year separation, it had its roots in the chronic alcoholism of their Mr. Robedeaux, which led, in turn, to his and Mrs. Robedeaux's separation when Horace was just 8, to his death four years later, and, shortly thereafter, to Mrs. Robedeaux's prompt remarriage. Unfortunately for Horace, Pete Davenport had proved an only half-willing step-parent, agreeing to take on Lily but not her 12-year-old sibling, insisting instead that Horace go out and earn his own way, much as Davenport himself had allegedly done at his age.) However, Mrs. Davenport's best laid plans quickly unravel when Pete decides to drastically curtail his planned 3-week trip.

== Cast ==
All credits derived from The Motion Picture Guide : 1997 Annual (The films of 1996).

- Mary Stuart Masterson as Lily Dale
- Sam Shepard as Pete Davenport
- Stockard Channing as Corella
- Tim Guinee as Horace Robideaux
- John Slattery as Will Kidder
- Jean Stapleton as Mrs. Coons
- Sean Hennigan as Card Player
- Chamblee Ferguson as Drummer
- Elbert Lewis as Vegetable Vendor
- Jonathan Bren as Trio Singer
- Brent Anderson as Trio Singer
- Mark Walters as Uncle Albert
- Angee Hughes as Mrs. Westheimer
- John Hussey as Mr. Westheimer
- Horton Foote as Voice of Old Horace

== Production ==
Filming took place in the Dallas–Fort Worth metroplex, beginning in December 1995 and concluding the following month. According to Foote biographer Wilborn Hampton, Shepard—having himself first achieved fame as a playwright before embarking on his more lucrative onscreen career—had turned down a Showtime project paying four times as much for the opportunity to participate in this production, yet was, at the same time, utterly appalled at the network's tight-fisted funding of its ostensibly prestige production. "Who are these people? Don't they know this is Horton Foote?"

== Reception ==
The film received mixed reviews, with America's papers of record prominent among the naysayers. Both the New York and Los Angeles Times found fault with the play as well as its screen adaptation. John J. O'Connor cites Foote's best-known work, The Trip to Bountiful, and bemoans Lily's lack of any corresponding "Page-like turn to galvanize the production." O'Connor's L.A. counterpart Robert Koehler calls Lily Dale a "curiously pallid work from an usually interesting writer," suffering from "weak, sepia-toned cinematography [and] the hazy, lazy nature of Foote's dramaturgy." On the plus side, both O'Connor and Koehler deem Stockard Channing's portrayal of the conflicted mother one of the film's few positives. The Washington Post's Linton Weeks, however, attached no such qualification to his blistering critique, describing the production as "simply awful," adding that, "unlike Foote's masterpieces Tender Mercies and The Trip to Bountiful, this play is buh-leak beyond belief."

By contrast, the Dallas Morning News, New York Daily News, Chicago Tribune, Hartford Courant, and Philadelphia Inquirer were all but unanimous in their praise, a common theme being the contrast between the substance and subtlety on display in Lily Dale and the redundancy, risk avoidance, and even outright pandering so prevalent in network TV programming. On that note, Morning News critic Ed Bark concludes his review.

"Lily Dale" resonates without being cloying or obvious. It's a heartbreaker on its own terms. Showtime should be commended for providing it with a home – albeit a home away from most homes. The bottom line? Increasingly bottom-feeding commercial networks should consider what they're missing by shunning movies such as "Lily Dale." More to the point, they should consider what we're missing.

Variety's Tony Scott stakes out something of a middle ground, stating at the outset that the source work is "not a great play" (upon which he later expands by dubbing it a "morose two-act-er," albeit one which director Masterson and assorted crew members have "coaxed into a comfortable flow"), but immediately adds, much like Dallas critic Bark, that "it's absorbing, uninterrupted theater — something PBS and the commercial nets have too much laid aside." He also notes that Guinee's "self-contained, uncomplaining, repressed Horace glows" and that Jean Stapleton's two appearances as the "well-meaning Mrs. Coons"—in the bookending scenes of Horace's train journeys to and from the film's principal setting—are "beautifully realized."

== Accolades ==
Jean-Pierre Dorléac received an Emmy nomination—as Jean-Pierre Dorleac—for "Costume Design, Miniseries or Special."
