= James Houghton (artistic director) =

- Born: September 4, 1958; San Francisco, California, U.S.
- Died: August 2, 2016 (aged 57); Manhattan, New York City, U.S.
- Education: Santa Clara University (BFA); Southern Methodist University (MFA)
- Occupation(s): Educator, mentor, arts administrator
- Spouse: Joyce O'Connor
- Children: 2

James Houghton (September 4, 1958 – August 2, 2016) was an American educator, mentor, and arts administrator. He was primarily known for being the former Director of Drama at the Juilliard School and the former artistic director of Signature Theatre Company.

== Early life ==
James Houghton was born in San Francisco to his mother Joan Heaney, a preschool teacher and dental assistant, and his father Sherrill Houghton, a school administrator. He first became involved in theatre at St. Ignatius Preparatory School, a Jesuit school in the San Francisco Bay Area from which he graduated in 1976. He started his own theatre company with friends called Overeasy Productions at age 18.

Then, Houghton attended Meadows School of the Arts at Southern Methodist University in University Park, Texas as young actor, and directly after college auditioned for John Houseman and gained a spot in his prestigious group, The Acting Company.

Houghton was married to actress Joyce O'Connor with whom he had two children, Henry and Lily.

== Career ==
=== Acting and Directing ===
While in New York City early in his career, Houghton worked as an actor, director, waiter and carpenter.

=== Eugene O'Neill Theatre Center ===
Houghton became the artistic director of the Eugene O'Neill Theatre Center in Waterford, Connecticut from 2000-2003. Here, he developed plays by Kia Corthron, Gina Gionfriddo, David Lindsay-Abaire, and Adam Rapp among others.

=== Signature Theatre Company ===
When he was working with Romulus Linney, he first got the idea for Signature Theatre Company to showcase one playwright for an entire season. Featuring Linney, the first season starting in 1991 had 6 shows in an 87-seat house and spent $35,000. In the 1994-1995 season, they featured playwright Horton Foote and produced The Young Man from Atlanta, which later was produced on Broadway and won a Pulitzer Prize. Signature would go on to feature playwrights such as Edward Albee, Arthur Miller, Adrienne Kennedy, María Irene Fornés, and more recently the likes of Athol Fugard and Annie Baker.

It became apparent to Houghton soon that Signature Theatre Company needed a permanent and flexible home, and needed to build a theater, so in 2009 Houghton began fundraising. The building was first going to be featured at the Ground Zero location downtown as part of a redevelopment of downtown by mayor Michael Bloomberg. When costs began to be prohibitive, they moved towards the 42nd street Times Square theatre district. Part of the program to convince to build there was a plan to underwrite tickets so that they would be frozen at $25 each.

Houghton ended up raising $70 million for the project. Pershing Square Signature Center opened in 2012, and is a three-theatre, 75,000 square foot complex designed by Frank Gehry Architects. It also includes two studio spaces, a shared lobby with a café, a bookshop, concierge desk, and administrative offices. The intent was to create a haven for theatre-makers, especially playwrights, that would hold 10 playwrights in residence to produce shows from the level of readings to full productions and all levels in-between. The goal of these types of programs and the subsequent building where to provide a sense of living and creating under one roof and creating points of intersection between artists, as Houghton once explained:

"What running these three programs simultaneously is about is that we get to collide. The artists and audience get to breathe the same air. We have such an appetite for it, whether we’re colliding with ourselves in the story we’re seeing, or the people we’re seeing it with, or the artists we bump into. To me, that’s what theater is. I hope this one gives much pleasure to many people for many years to come."

Houghton stepped down for the 2015-2016 season, and was replaced by Paige Evans, formerly the artistic director of LCT3, the new-play development program at Lincoln Center Theater.

=== Juilliard School ===
Houghton became the Richard Rodgers Director of Drama at the Juilliard School in the 2006-2007 season, taking over the program that was founded by his former mentor John Houseman.

After starting at Juilliard, he shifted the program from a one-day audition process and a cut program that would drop up to 1/3 of students after their first year to a weekend audition process with no-cuts. He also obtained funding and created for a Master of Fine Arts program that fully funds the students' final year of school as well as provides a stipend for living and working. Additionally, the masters program included a partnership with Signature in order to give students experience in a professional theatrical atmosphere. He spoke on his goals for the program: "My greatest hope for the students graduating from the Juilliard graduate division is that we provide them the opportunity to be expressive and more of themselves, and that we give them the tools to express through their work in a manner that is generous, responsible and authentic. We want our graduates to enter the workplace not just prepared for the task at hand, but equipped to produce work that ultimately stems from their core selves… who they are, and their own voice."

== Awards and accolades ==
In 2015, Houghton was presented a special Obie Award by the American Theatre Wing for Sustained Achievement in the theatrical community.

== Death and legacy ==
On August 2, 2016, Houghton died of stomach cancer in Manhattan.

Former collaborator Tony Kushner wrote on the death of Houghton: "He was smart and passionate. He built his singular legacy, founded on his devotion to playwrights’ work and to playwrights themselves, with a uniquely sweet, generous spirit; with unflagging optimism; and with grace."

Colleague Oskar Eustis, artistic director of The Public Theater, wrote upon hearing of Houghton's passing: "By his example, he reminded me constantly that we are all in this together, that theater isn’t a competition but a communion, that art isn’t a zero-sum game but a way of being that elevates all of us, and that the collaborative nature of our form must be reflected in the way we treat one another."
