= Jean-Pierre Dorléac =

American costume designer (1943-2026)

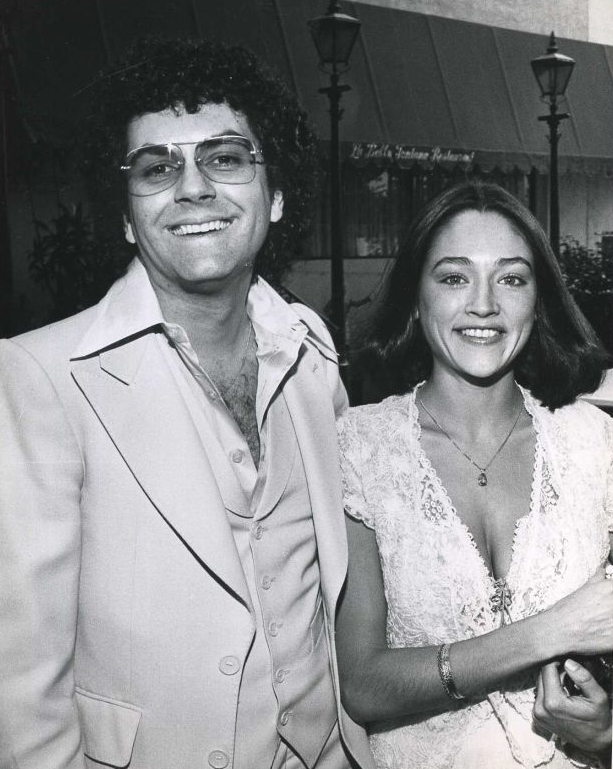
- Dorléac with British-American actress Olivia Hussey, circa 1978
- Born: Jerome Benson Paine; April 12, 1943; San Bernardino, California, U.S.
- Died: July 23, 2026 (aged 83); Los Angeles, California, U.S.
- Other name: Jean-Pierre Dorléac
- Occupation: Costume designer
- Years active: 1972–2004

Jean-Pierre Dorléac (born Jerome Benson Paine; April 12, 1943 – July 23, 2026) was an American costume designer who primarily worked in television.

== Life and career ==
Dorléac was born Jerome Benson Paine in San Bernardino, California, on April 12, 1943 to an American military family of Ruby Mae Culver and Joseph Paine. In the 1960s, Jerome served as an enlisted member of the US Air Force, and took courses in theater, where he pursued acting. His acting career was not successful. Preferring to design costumes, he started his career in the theatrical and film industry in the United States in 1972, where he first assumed the name Jean-Pierre Dorléac for a stage production of Marat/Sade. He was nominated at the 53rd Academy Awards in the category of Best Costumes for his work on the 1980 film Somewhere in Time.

Additionally he was nominated for eleven Emmy Awards, winning twice for the 1978 TV series Battlestar Galactica and the 1999-2001 TV series The Lot. He was also nominated for Quantum Leap five times, along with Mae West, Lily Dale, The Bastard and Tales of the Gold Monkey.

He was also known for films The Blue Lagoon, Heart and Souls, and Leave It to Beaver among many others.

In 2015, Dorleac published The Naked Truth: An Irreverent Chronicle of Delirious Escapades. The book was an account of select Hollywood names that he claimed he had known or worked with, ranging from Fred Astaire to Edith Head.

== Personal life ==
Dorleac was gay, and had a husband called Gilberto Mello, whom he met in Rio De Janeiro. Dorléac died at his home in Hollywood Hills on July 23, 2026, at the age of 83.

== Selected filmography ==
=== Films ===
- The Great Smokey Roadblock (1977)
- Good Guys Wear Black (1978)
- Battlestar Galactica (1978)
- Buck Rogers in the 25th Century (1979)
- The Blue Lagoon (1980)
- Somewhere in Time (1980)
- National Lampoon's Class Reunion (1982)
- The Boss' Wife (1986)
- The Killing Time (1987)
- Heart and Souls (1993)
- The Only Thrill (1997)
- Leave It to Beaver (1997)
- Walking to the Waterline (1998)
- In Enemy Hands (2004)

=== Television movies ===
- The Bastard (1978)
- The Rebels (1979)
- Jacqueline Susann's Valley of the Dolls (1981)
- Twirl (1981)
- Mae West (1982)
- Rooster (1982)
- Rosie: The Rosemary Clooney Story (1982)
- Airwolf (1984)
- The Highwayman (1987)
- For the Very First Time (1991)
- A Burning Passion: The Margaret Mitchell Story (1994)
- An Element of Truth (1995)
- Dead Man's Island (1995)
- Lily Dale (1996)

=== Television series ===
- Battlestar Galactica (1978)
- Galactica 1980 (1980)
- The Greatest American Hero (1981)
- Tales of the Gold Monkey (1983)
- Emerald Point N.A.S. (1983)
- Masquerade (1983)
- Automan (1983)
- Knight Rider (1984)
- Airwolf (1984)
- Cover Up (1984)
- Max Headroom (1987)
- Jake and the Fatman (1987)
- Matlock (1988)
- Quantum Leap (1989–91)
- The Lot (2001)
