= Midnight Caller (disambiguation) =

Midnight Caller is an American TV series.

Midnight Caller may also refer to:

- The Midnight Caller (play) 1957
- "Midnight Caller", song by Chase & Status (featuring Clare Maguire) from the album No More Idols
- "Midnight Caller", song by Badfinger from the album No Dice
