= James Colby =

American actor (1961–2018)

- Born: James Leo Colby; September 20, 1961; Arlington, Massachusetts, U.S.
- Died: February 23, 2018 (aged 56); New York City, U.S.
- Education: Bridgewater State University; Brooklyn College
- Occupation: Actor
- Years active: 1993–2018
- Spouse: Alyssa Bresnahan (m. 2008)
- Children: 1

James Leo Colby (September 20, 1961 – February 23, 2018) was an American actor in film, television and stage. Colby appeared in multiple Broadway plays and few stage productions in Connecticut.

Colby was notable for his film roles in The Peacemaker (1997), Tower Heist (2011), Safe (2012), The Amazing Spider-Man 2 (2014) and in Patriots Day (2016). In television, he was known for his role as Sergeant Ray Dwyer in Chicago P.D., Burleson in Empire.

== Early life ==
Colby was born in Arlington, Massachusetts. He studied at Bridgewater State University and Brooklyn College. He moved to Manhattan in the 1980s to pursue his stage career.

== Career ==
In stage, Colby was seen in the 1992 Broadway production of Hamlet. He performed extensively Off-Broadway at The Public Theater, Roundabout Theatre Company, Manhattan Theatre Club, Playwrights Horizons, New York Theatre Workshop, Westside Theatre and Symphony Space.

Colby had a long association with Hartford Stage included Tennessee Williams's A Streetcar Named Desire, Camino Real, The Night of the Iguana, and Cat on a Hot Tin Roof.

His stage roles include Blade to the Heat (1994), The Food Chain (1995), The Devils (1997), The Butterfly Collection (2000), The Day Emily Married (2004) and Dividing the Estate (2007). He originated the role of Stan in the off-Broadway production of Lynn Nottage's Sweat (2016), later reprising his turn in the Pulitzer Prize-winning play's Broadway premiere.

His non-stage credits include television roles ranging from Taxi Brooklyn, Law & Order, Limitless, Jessica Jones, Blue Bloods, Law & Order: Special Victims Unit, Deception, and The Blacklist. His film roles include Demolition, Tower Heist, Safe, Solitary Man, The Company Men, and in The Opponent. His last role was in the TV series Taken, Season 2, Episode 11.

Colby appeared as Lieutenant Bill Cranston in Gotham in 2014. In 2016, he starred as Ed Manion in the miniseries Madoff, from 2017 to 2018 Colby starred as Burleson in Empire and FBI SWAT Jackson in Tell Me a Story in season 2.

Colby starred as William B. Evans of the Boston Police Department in the 2016 true crime-drama-thriller film Patriots Day alongside Mark Wahlberg.

== Personal life ==
Colby met his wife, actress Alyssa Bresnahan, when she played Stella to his Stanley, during a production of A Streetcar Named Desire in 1998. They were married in December 2008 and had one daughter together.

== Death ==
Colby died on February 23, 2018, in New York City at the age of 56.
