= The Young Man from Atlanta =

Play written by Horton Foote

- Written by: Horton Foote
- Subject: Two parents attempt to cope with the death and homosexuality of their only son
- Genre: Drama
- Setting: Spring, 1950. Houston, Texas.

Premiere
- Date: January 27, 1995
- Place: Signature Theatre; New York City

The Young Man from Atlanta is a drama written by American dramatist Horton Foote first produced Off-Broadway by the Signature Theatre in January 1995. Foote received the 1995 Pulitzer Prize for Drama. This was one of four Foote plays the group produced during its 1994/1995 season.

== Overview ==
In this play Foote revived characters which had been in his The Orphans' Home Cycle of nine plays. Will Kidder — 64 years old in this play — was in his early twenties in Lily Dale, and approaching middle age in Cousins. Sixty-year-old Lily Dale Kidder was introduced in Roots in a Parched Ground as a ten-year-old, and was portrayed in subsequent life stages in Lily Dale and Cousins. Her stepfather, 72-year-old Pete Davenport, first appears at age thirty in Roots in a Parched Ground. According to the playwright, he thought he was done with these characters after Cousins, but in the early 1990s found himself thinking about them again and started work on this play.

== Plot ==
In 1950, Will Kidder, age 64, is at his office at the Sunshine Southern Wholesale Grocery, where he has worked since his early 20s. He and his wife Lily Dale have just moved into their new house in Houston and, in Will's words, "There's no finer house in Houston." He was poor as a child and had a successful career. However, Will is fired.

Will talks about his only son, Bill, who had moved to Atlanta. Bill drowned six months ago, and Will suspects Bill actually committed suicide. Lily Dale refuses to consider that he committed suicide, instead believing that his death was an accident. Bill's roommate, Randy Carter, the "Young Man from Atlanta", had been trying to see Will, who believes that all he wants is money. Will learns that Bill had given Randy money, but eventually accepts that he knew Bill and "that's the only Bill I care to know about." A review in The New York Times titled "Nameless Menace in Latest by Foote" points out: "This being 1950, nobody in the play mentions the word 'gay,' or refers even euphemistically to the truth of the relationship between Bill and Randy."

=== Characters ===
- Lily Dale Kidder
- Will Kidder
- Pete Davenport
- Carson
- Tom Jackson
- Miss Lacey
- Ted Cleveland Jr.
- Clara
- Etta Doris Meneffree

== Productions ==
The Young Man from Atlanta opened Off-Broadway at the Signature Theatre on January 27, 1995, and closed on February 26, 1995. Directed by Peter Masterson, the cast featured Ralph Waite as Will Kidder, Carlin Glynn as Lily Dale and James Pritchett as Pete Davenport. The production won the 1995 Pulitzer Prize for Drama.

The play was next produced at the Huntington Theatre in Boston, Massachusetts in 1995, the Alley Theatre in Houston on February 16, 1996, to March 16, both with Ralph Waite and Carlin Glynn, and the Goodman Theatre (Chicago) in January 1997, with new cast members Rip Torn and Shirley Knight. (The play had been developed at the Alley Theatre, where it had readings.)

The play opened on Broadway at the Longacre Theatre running from March 13, 1997 (previews) to June 8, 1997. Directed by Robert Falls, the cast featured Rip Torn as Will Kidder, Shirley Knight as Lily Dale, and Biff McGuire as Pete Davenport. The play was nominated for the Tony Award for Best Play, Biff McGuire for Best Performance by a Featured Actor, and Shirley Knight for the Best Performance by a Leading Actress.

The play was revived Off-Broadway at the Signature Theatre, opening on November 24, 2019. The director is Michael Wilson, with the principal cast of Aidan Quinn as Will Kidder, Kristine Nielsen as Lily Dale, and Stephen Payne as Pete Davenport.

=== Development ===
Because the producer felt that the play needed changes, a new director, Robert Falls, and new cast were added. The producer said of Falls: "We reached for someone we considered to be the best director in the country for American material, someone who could take Horton's remarkable work and best reveal the subterranean working beneath the surface." Changes to the script were in the nature of fine tuning, for example, moving exposition from one scene to another part of the play.

== Awards and nominations ==
=== Original Off-Broadway production ===
Year	Award	Category	Nominee	Result
1995	Pulitzer Prize	Pulitzer Prize for Drama	Horton Foote	Won

=== Original Broadway production ===
Year	Award	Category	Nominee	Result
1997	Tony Award	Best Play		Nominated
1997	Tony Award	Best Actress in a Play	Shirley Knight	Nominated
1997	Tony Award	Best Featured Actor in a Play	Biff McGuire	Nominated
