= William Converse-Roberts =

American actor

William Converse-Roberts is an American actor. He was born William Converse Roberts in Needham, Massachusetts. He attended both Stony Brook University and the Yale School of Drama. In 1989, he won an Obie Award for his performance in an Off-Broadway production of Love's Labour's Lost. He resides in Los Angeles County, California.

== Filmography ==
=== Film ===
William Converse-Roberts film credits
Year	Title	Role
1985	1918	Horace Robedaux
1986	On Valentine's Day	Horace Robedaux
1987	Courtship	Horace Robedaux
1992	Just Off the Coast	Daniel Claymore
1997	Kiss the Girls	Dr. Wick Sachs
1999	Crazy in Alabama	Murphy
1999	Drive Me Crazy	Mr. Hammond
2001	Bandits	Charles Wheeler

=== Television ===
William Converse-Roberts television credits
Year	Title	Role	Notes
1979	Mayflower: The Pilgrims' Adventure	Stephen Hopkins	TV movie
1979	Ryan's Hope	Duke Cheever	13 episdoes
1981	Another World	Blue	3 episodes
1982	American Playhouse		Episode: "Story of a Marriage"
1985	Stone Pillow	Max	TV movie
1985	Private Sessions	Artist	TV movie
1987	Spenser: For Hire	Clay Roberts	Episode: "The Heart of the Matter"
1987	Crime Story	Steve Altman	3 episodes: "The Kingdom of Money," "The Battle of Las Vegas," "The Survivor"
1987	The Equalizer	Will Rattigan	Episode: "Suspicion of Innocence"
1987-1991	The Days and Nights of Molly Dodd	Fred Dodd	30 episodes, Director credits for S3.E11 "Here's a Shot in the Dark"
1989	The Equalizer	John Kelly	Episode: "Making of a Martyr"
1990	L.A. Law	Wayne Lafferty	Episode: "Justice Swerved"
1991	Sisters	Bingo	Episode: "Devoted Husband, Loving Father"
1991–1993	Reasonable Doubts	Dist. Atty. Arthur Gold	44 episodes
1994	The Commish	Doug Magruder	Episodes: "The Lady Vanishes"
1994	Confessions: Two Faces of Evil	John Watson	TV movie
1995	Serving in Silence: The Margarethe Cammermeyer Story		TV movie
1995	Almost Golden: The Jessica Savitch Story	Dr. Donald Payne	TV movie
1995	Deadly Family Secrets	District Attorney Brooke Akins	TV movie
1995	Murder, She Wrote	Justin	Episode: "Home Care"
1995	Diagnosis Murder	Ivan Brock	Episode: "The Bela Lugosi Blues"
1995–1996	John Grisham's The Client	Dr. Gus Gardoni	6 episodes
1996	One West Wikiki	Dr. Scott Jenkins	Episode: "Allergic to Golf"
1996–1997	Dangerous Minds	Hal Gray	6 episodes
1997	House of Frankenstein	Grant Russo	2 episodes
1998–2002	The Practice	Atty. Michael Forbes	3 episodes
1998-2002	Any Day Now	Matt O'Brien	32 episodes
2000	Diagnosis Murder	Ethan Foster	Episode: "By Reason of Insanity"
2000	The District	Congressman Donner	Episode: "The Jackal"
2001	Kate Brasher	Lincoln Cole	Episode: "Jackson"
2002	Firefly	Gabriel Tam	Episode "Safe"
2002	Robbery Homicide Division	C. Conway Plummer	Episode: "Had"

== Theatre Credits ==
=== Stage Appearances ===
William Converse-Roberts stage appearances
Year	Stage Production	Role	Theatre	Location
1978	Sganarelle: An Evening of Moliere Farces	Lycaste ("The Forced Marriage"), Lelie ("Sganarelle"), Member of ensemble ("A Dumb Show")	New York Shakespeare Festival, Public Theatre	New York City, NY
1979-1980	Sorrows of Stephen	Understudy for Stephen Hurt	Joseph Papp Public Theatre	New York City, NY
1981	Frankenstein	Victor Frankenstein	Palace Theatre	New York City, NY
1981	The Chisholm Trail Went Through Here	Bryan	Manhattan Theatre Club In-the-Works, Upstage Theatre	New York City, NY
1981	Romeo and Juliet		Dallas Shakespeare Festival	Dallas, TX
1981	As You Like It		Dallas Shakespeare Festival	Dallas, TX
1982	Monday after the Miracle	John	Eugene O'Neill Theatre	New York City, NY
1983	Lumiere	Eugene	Ark Theatre Company, Ark Theatre	New York City, NY
1983	Buried Inside Extra	Don Kane	New York Shakespeare Festival, Public Theatre	New York City, NY
1984	Romance Language	Henry David Thoreau, George Armstrong Custer	Playwrights Horizons Theatre	New York City, NY
1984	The Common Pursuit		Long Wharf Theatre	New Haven, CT
1985	Mrs. Warren's Profession	Frank Gardner	Roundabout Theatre	New York City, NY
1985	Walk the Dog	Willie	Production Company	New York City, NY
1988	Big Time: Scenes from a Service Economy	Paul	American Theatre Exchange, Joyce Theatre	New York City, NY
1989	Love's Labor's Lost	Berowne	New York Shakespeare Festival, Public/Newman Theatre	New York City, NY
1989	Macbeth	Captain, Macduff	Joseph Papp Public Theatre/Martinson Hall	New York City, NY
1992-1993	Creditors	Adolf	American Conservatory Theatre	San Francisco, CA
