= The Day Emily Married =

Play written by Horton Foote

- Original language: English
- Written by: Horton Foote
- Characters: Sadie; Lyd Davis "Belle"; Emily; Richard Murray; Addie; Lee Davis; Lucy Fay; Alma Nash; Maud Barker
- Setting: Early summer of 1956 in Harrison, Texas

Premiere
- Date: May/June 1997
- Place: Silver Spring Stage

The Day Emily Married is a play by Horton Foote. The play takes place in the fictitious town of Harrison, Texas, where Foote has set many of his plays.

== Setting ==
The setting is in the early summer of 1955 and takes place in Harrison, Texas. (Southern Texas town, 50 miles southwest of Houston and 40 miles north of the Gulf of Mexico)

== Synopsis ==
A newlywed couple, Emily and Richard Murray, move into the house of her parents. Emily had divorced her first husband. She soon finds herself caught between her seemingly-ideal husband and her family. Her parents, Lyd and Lee Davis, are loving but also controlling. Lee plans on selling his own farm and some property, to help Richard set up a business.

== Productions ==
The play premiered at the Silver Spring Stage in Silver Spring, Maryland in May/June 1997. It was directed by Jack Sbarbori and the cast included Eugenia Sorgnit (Sadie), Gay Hill (Lyd Davis "Belle"), Stephanie Mumford (Emily), Bob Justis (Richard Murray), Sunday Wynkoop (Addie), Rob Peters (Lee Davis), Elizabeth Lawrence (Lucy Fay), Patty Richmond (Alma Nash), and Marilyn Osterman (Maud Barker).

The Day Emily Married was presented by the Lost World theatre company, Whittier, California, in July 2000. According to Playbill, the play was written in the 1960s but never performed until the Silver Spring Stage amateur workshop, the Lost World being the first fully staged production. The Lost World company had presented a staged reading of the play in November 1998, featuring Peri Gilpin as Emily.

The play opened the Primary Stages 20th anniversary season. The play opened Off-Broadway at the 59 East 59th Street Theatre on August 3, 2004 and closed on August 29, 2004. Directed by Michael Wilson, the set design was by Jeff Cowie, costume design by David C. Woolard, lighting design by Rui Rita, and sound design by Andre Plues. It starred Estelle Parsons (Lyd Davis "Belle"), Hallie Foote (Emily), Biff McGuire (Lee Davis), James Colby (Richard Murray), Terri Keane (Alma Nash), Delores Mitchell (Addie), and Pamela Payton-Wright (Maud Cleveland).

== Critical response ==
Elyse Sommer, in her review for CurtainUp, wrote: "The pleasure of The Day Emily Married comes from the unobtrusive excellence Foote still extracts from that bone and what the actors do with the roles he's written for them." Ben Brantley in his New York Times review wrote "Even at its most forced, The Day Emily Married emanates an infectious, eerily familiar melancholy that keeps pricking at the memory like a wandering melody. I can think of no other playwright who is as harsh in his sentimentality as Mr. Foote is. His plays may radiate the burnished nostalgia of sepia-tone photographs, but he insists on your feeling that there is more ice than fire in their glow."
