= 33 Variations =

Play written by Moisés Kaufman

33 Variations is a play by Moisés Kaufman, inspired by Ludwig van Beethoven's Diabelli Variations. It débuted on Broadway on March 9, 2009, starring Jane Fonda. Originally written in 2007, its world première was held at Arena Stage in Washington, D.C. before continuing on to La Jolla Playhouse in 2008.

== Plot ==
The play simultaneously examines the creative process behind Beethoven's Diabelli Variations and the journey of a musicologist, Katherine Brandt, to discover the meaning behind why Beethoven was compelled to write thirty-three distinct variations on a simple theme by a minor music publisher. The progression of her Amyotrophic lateral sclerosis (ALS) and her relationship with her daughter are also themes of the story, as is Beethoven's growing deafness.

The action takes place both in Beethoven's time and the present, switching back and forth between the two. However, at certain key points, characters from both time periods appear on stage to deliver lines simultaneously, emphasizing the parallels between the exploits of both sets of characters.

== Production history ==
The original production was directed by the playwright, Moisés Kaufman, with piano by Diane Walsh.

33 Variations premièred at Arena Stage in September 2007, with Mary Beth Peil as Katherine, Laura Odeh as her daughter Clara, and Graeme Malcolm as Beethoven.

A West Coast production ran in April 2008 at La Jolla Playhouse's Mandell Weiss Theatre, with Jayne Atkinson as Katherine, Zach Grenier as Beethoven, and Odeh returning as Clara.

The play premièred on Broadway at the Eugene O'Neill Theatre in a limited engagement, on March 9, 2009, with Jane Fonda as Katherine, in her first appearance on Broadway in forty-six years. Grenier returned as Beethoven. Sets by Derek McLane; costumes by Janice Pytel; lighting by David Lander; sound by André J. Pluess; projection design by Jeff Sugg; choreography by Daniel Pelzig. It closed May 21, 2009.

33 Variations had regional premieres at Carolina Actors Studio Theatre in Charlotte, North Carolina on November 23, 2012, at the Capital Repertory Theatre in Albany, New York on September 10, 2010, and at the Ensemble Theatre of Cincinnati on September 2, 2009.

In March 2019, the play was staged for a limited engagement at the Comedy Theatre in Melbourne, Australia. The production featured Ellen Burstyn as Katherine, Lisa McCune as Clara, William McInnes as Beethoven, Francis Greenslade as Diabelli, Helen Morse as Gertrude, André de Vanny as Schindler, and Toby Truslove as Mike

== Awards and nominations ==
2009 Tony Awards:

- Best Play (nominated)
- Best Performance by a Leading Actress in a Play, Jane Fonda (nominated)
- Best Performance by a Featured Actor in a Play, Zach Grenier (nominated)
- Best Scenic Design of a Play, Derek McLane (WINNER)
- Best Lighting Design of a Play, David Lander (nominated)

It won the 2007 Edgerton New American Play Award and the 2008 Harold and Mimi Steinberg American Theatre Critics Association New Play Award.
