= William McGhee =

American actor

William McGhee (July 24, 1930 – February 17, 2007) was an American stage, film and television actor. He was also known professionally as Bill McGee, Bill McGhee and William Bill McGhee.

== Hotel explosion ==
On June 21, 1946, aged 15, McGhee held an elevator operator job at the Baker Hotel in downtown Dallas, when an ammonia explosion occurred during work on a refrigeration unit. He was temporarily reported as dead in the media, but he survived. He suffered amnesia, but was fully restored to health. He resumed his pursuit for the theater after recovery.

== Korean War ==
He served his country as an Army corporal in the 31st Unit division in the Korean War, and performed for the troops at Camp Atterbury, Indiana. He was among the soldiers exposed to atmospheric nuclear testing at Yucca Flats, Nevada to measure the bomb's consequences. He was reportedly selected for the mission because of the injuries he had survived in the Baker Hotel blast.

== Acting career ==
After his honorable discharge from the military, McGhee returned to performing at the Dallas Theater Center's Janus Players. In 1954, he broke racial barriers and was the first African-American actor to perform professionally on the Dallas stage in roles without racial requirements. He performed in more than 35 theater productions and stage plays, and in more than 15 films, including High Yellow (1965), Curse of the Swamp Creature (1966), Don't Look in the Basement (1973), Drive-In (1976), 1918 (1985) and Riverbend (1989).

He was one of the first unionized African-American actors in Dallas with SAG (Screen Actors Guild) and AFTRA (American Federation of Television and Radio Artists).

== Death ==
McGhee died from male breast cancer, aged 76. He was survived by his wife, Ina B. Daniels Hurdle-McGhee, a civil rights activist, as well as by his children: a son, Derek McGhee, a daughter, Dawn McGhee, an actress/director/producer. He was also survived by ten siblings.

== Filmography ==
Year	Title	Role	Notes
1963	Free, White and 21	Witness	
1964	The Trial of Lee Harvey Oswald	Witness	
1965	High Yellow	Joseph	
1971	Fairplay	Jefferson Washington	
1971	Quadroon	Jacques	
1973	Don't Look in the Basement	Sam	
1973	The Pickle Goes in the Middle	Scarfie School Teacher	
1974	Slick Silver		
1976	Drive-In	Dr. Demars	
1985	1918	Sam the Cemetery Worker	
1986	On Valentine's Day	Sam	
1986	Shadows on the Wall	Preacher Readman	
1989	Riverbend	Reverend Benson	(final film role)
