= Virtual Studios =

American finance and film production studio

Virtual Studios, LLC
- Company type: Private limited company
- Industry: Entertainment
- Founded: 2005; 21 years ago
- Founders: Benjamin Waisbren
- Defunct: 2009; 17 years ago
- Fate: Closed
- Headquarters: United States
- Products: Motion pictures
- Services: Film financing, Film production, Film distribution, Film development

Virtual Studios LLC was an American film financier, distributor and production studio based in the United States.

== History ==
=== Establishment and early years ===
Virtual Studios was founded by film producer Benjamin Waisbren in 2005 as a film financier and media company. The funding was backed by the hedge fund Stark Investments, where he worked at the time of founding.

=== Film industry ===
The companies first film production and financing credits were the romantic comedy film Duane Hopwood and the dystopian political thriller film V for Vendetta in 2005. In 2006, they signed a deal to produce and finance films in association with Warner Bros. Their next films (Poseidon, V for Vendetta, The Good German and 300) were all distributed by Warner Bros. The Assassination of Jesse James by the Coward Robert Ford was their last film they co-produced for Warner Bros. and the deal was signed off. Their last film was Bangkok Dangerous and the company was left dormant after the film became a box-office flop.

=== Virtual Films ===
Virtual Studios started a film distribution company called Virtual Films in early 2006. The company was short-lived and only lasted a year, and it was shut down in 2007. First Born was the only film that Virtual Films distributed.

== Closure ==
Virtual Studios ultimately closed in 2009 after being dormant for a year due to Waisbren leaving the company to pursue other ventures. He later worked for LStar Capital's film funding company LSC Film Corporation on their deal with Sony Pictures, and also currently owns and operates Virtually There Holdings LLC since 2014.

== Films ==
Release date	Film title	Notes
November 11, 2005	Duane Hopwood	distributed by IFC Films; co-produced by Big Beach; first Virtual Studios film
March 17, 2006	V For Vendetta	distributed and produced by Warner Bros. Pictures; co-produced by Silver Pictures, Anarchos Productions Inc., Vertigo, Medienboard Berlin-Brandenburg and Fünfte Babelsberg Film GmbH.
May 12, 2006	Poseidon	distributed and produced by Warner Bros. Pictures; co-produced by, Irwin Allen Productions, Next Entertainment, Radiance Productions and Synthesis Entertainment.
December 8, 2006	Blood Diamond	distributed and produced by Warner Bros. Pictures; co-produced by Bedford Falls Productions and Initial Entertainment Group
December 15, 2006	The Good German	distributed by Warner Bros. Pictures; co-produced by Section Eight Productions
March 9, 2007	300	distributed and produced by Warner Bros. Pictures; co-produced by Legendary Pictures, Atmosphere Pictures and Hollywood Gang Productions
March 20, 2007	First Born	
April 26, 2007	Gardener of Eden	co-produced by Appian Way Productions
April 27, 2007	Next	distributed by Paramount Pictures; co-produced by Revolution Studios, Initial Entertainment Group and Saturn Films
June 15, 2007	Nancy Drew	distributed and produced by Warner Bros. Pictures; co-produced by Jerry Weintraub Productions
September 21, 2007	The Assassination of Jesse James by the Coward Robert Ford	distributed and produced by Warner Bros. Pictures; co-produced by Scott Free Productions and Plan B Entertainment
January 18, 2008	Cassandra's Dream	distributed by StudioCanal Limited overseas while The Weinstein Company handled the US Distribution rights; co-produced by The Wild Bunch
September 5, 2008	Bangkok Dangerous	distributed by Lionsgate; co-produced by Saturn Films and Blue Star Entertainment; final Virtual Studios film
