= On Valentine's Day =

- Directed by: Ken Harrison
- Written by: Horton Foote (play and screenplay)
- Produced by: Lillian V. Foote; Calvin Skaggs
- Starring: William Converse-Roberts; Hallie Foote; Matthew Broderick
- Cinematography: George Tirl
- Edited by: Nancy Baker
- Music by: Jonathan Sheffer
- Release date: 1986
- Language: English

On Valentine's Day is a 1986 American drama film directed by Ken Harrison. It is the prequel to Harrison's 1918. It was entered into the main competition at the 43rd Venice International Film Festival and was screened at the 1986 Toronto International Film Festival.

== Plot ==
On Valentine's Day is the central film in Horton Foote's semi-autobiographical trilogy that also includes Courtship and 1918. It is a nearly verbatim retelling of his stage play and the sets and costumes.

== Cast ==
- William Converse-Roberts as Horace Robedaux
- Hallie Foote as Elizabeth Robedaux
- Rochelle Oliver as Mrs. Mary Vaughn
- Michael Higgins as Mr. Vaughn
- Matthew Broderick as Brother Vaughn
- Richard Jenkins as Bobby Pate
- Steven Hill as George Tyler
- Irma P. Hall as Aunt Charity
- Bill McGhee as Sam, the Cemetery Worker
- Carol Goodheart as Miss Ruth
- Horton Foote Jr. as Jessie
- Tim Green as Sheriff
