= Michael Higgins (actor) =

American actor

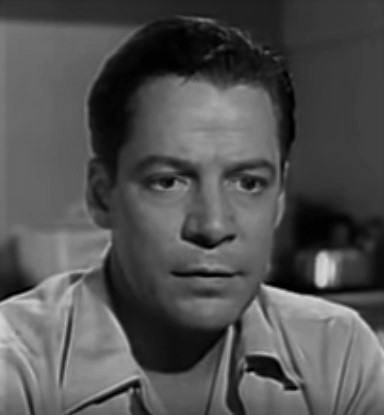
- Born: Michael Patrick Higgins, Jr. January 20, 1920; Brooklyn, New York
- Died: November 5, 2008 (aged 88); Manhattan, New York
- Years active: 1949–2008
- Spouse: Elizabeth Lee (Betty) Goodwin (m. 1946)
- Children: 3

Michael Patrick Higgins Jr. (January 20, 1920 – November 5, 2008) was an American actor who appeared in film and on stage, and was best known for his role in the original Broadway production of Equus.

== Early life ==
Higgins was born in Brooklyn on January 20, 1920, the son of Mary Katherine (née McGowan) and Michael Peter Higgins, a poet and grocer who worked in the insurance business. He made efforts as a teenager to rid himself of his Brooklyn accent, hoping for a future career in theater. His father gave him an early love of Shakespeare. He served in the United States Army in Italy during World War II, where he earned a Bronze Star Medal and a Purple Heart.

== Career ==
After returning from military service, Higgins made his Broadway debut on February 18, 1946, in a production of Antigone (1946), starring Katharine Cornell and Sir Cedric Hardwicke in a modern-dress adaptation of the Sophocles play based on Jean Anouilh's French version. Higgins played the role of the Third Guard.

Higgins appeared in the original Broadway production of Peter Shaffer's Equus in the role of Frank Strang, the father of a youth who blinds horses, alongside Peter Firth as the youth, Frances Sternhagen as Alan's mother and Anthony Hopkins as his psychiatrist. As part of cast that Clive Barnes called "exemplary", Walter Kerr found Higgins "excellent as a father turned ashen when caught out at a skin flick".

Among his Broadway performances are Romeo and Juliet as Benvolio with Olivia de Havilland in 1951, Jean Anouilh's The Lark in 1955 with Julie Harris and Christopher Plummer, Eugene O'Neill's The Iceman Cometh with James Earl Jones at Circle in the Square Theatre in 1973, and the 1980 production of Mixed Couples, his final Broadway appearance. In 1963, he starred in Antony and Cleopatra opposite Colleen Dewhurst, in Joseph Papp's Shakespeare Festival in Central Park. He won two Obie Awards for his work Off Broadway; for his 1958 performance as John Proctor in The Crucible and in 1980 in David Mamet's play Reunion. He won a Drama Desk Award in 1978 for his role in Molly, earning honors as Outstanding Featured Actor in a Play.

He appeared in early live television productions including Kraft Television Theatre, Academy Theatre and Studio One, as well as on Ben Casey, Gunsmoke and The Andy Griffith Show. From 1949 to 1951, he played the role of Johnny Roberts on the NBC television series One Man's Family.

Later in his career he worked primarily on screen, appearing in over 50 films. He co-starred in Coppola's The Conversation and Barbara Loden's Wanda. He appeared in Angel Heart, The Black Stallion, The Seduction of Joe Tynan, The Stepford Wives, David Mamet's State and Main, and Charlie Kaufman's Synecdoche, New York, among many others.

== Death ==
Higgins died at age 88 on November 5, 2008, at Beth Israel Medical Center of heart failure.

== Selected filmography ==
=== Film ===
- Shades of Gray (1948) - U.S. Army Soldier
- Edge of Fury (1958) - Richard Barrie
- Chūshingura: Hana no Maki, Yuki no Maki (1962) - Narrator (1963 US version) (voice)
- Terror in the City (1964) - Carl
- The Arrangement (1969) - Michael Anderson
- Wanda (1970) - Norman Dennis
- Desperate Characters (1971) - Francis Early
- The Conversation (1974) - Paul
- The Stepford Wives (1975) - Mr. Cornell
- Death Play (1976) - Sam
- An Enemy of the People (1978) - Billing
- King of the Gypsies (1978) - Traffic Court Judge
- The Seduction of Joe Tynan (1979) - Senator Pardew
- The Black Stallion (1979) - Neville
- Fort Apache, The Bronx (1981) - Heffernan
- A Midsummer Night's Sex Comedy (1982) - Reynolds
- Staying Alive (1983) - Dancer
- Rumble Fish (1983) - Mr. Harrigan
- Girls Just Want to Have Fun (1985) - Featured Dancer
- 1918 (1985) - Mr. Vaughn
- Seven Minutes in Heaven (1985) - Senator Peterson
- On Valentine's Day (1986) - Mr. Vaughn
- Angel Heart (1987) - Dr. Albert Fowler
- Courtship (1987) - Mr. Vaughn
- Crusoe (1988) - Dr. Martin
- New York Stories (1989) - Robber (segment "Life without Zoe")
- Dead Bang (1989) - Reverend Gebhardt
- Forced March (1989) - Andras Bereg
- The Local Stigmatic (1990) - Drunk man
- An Empty Bed (1990) - Man in 50's Restaurant
- Death Becomes Her (1992) - Dancer
- Wind (1992) - Artemus
- School Ties (1992) - Mr. Gierasch
- The Impostors (1998) - Older Man who Drops Dead
- Just the Ticket (1999) - Confessional Priest
- State and Main (2000) - Doc Wilson
- Swimfan (2002) - Mr. Tillman
- Messengers (2004) - Poor Old Man from Room 410
- Off the Black (2006) - Al Cook
- The Savages (2007) - Resident #1
- The Favor (2007) - Mr. Ritter
- Synecdoche, New York (2008) - Actor Playing Man with Nose Bleed
- An American Carol (2008) - Parent

=== Television ===
Michael Higgins television credits
Year	Title	Role	Notes
1949–1951	One Man's Family	Johnny Roberts	1 episode
1963	The Outer Limits	Dr. Thomas Kellander	Episode: "The Mice"
1963	Gunsmoke	Irish Immigrant Finnegan	Episode: "Two of a Kind"
1985	The Equalizer	Marvin Stahl	Episode: "Lady Cop"
1968	The Andy Griffith Show	Mr. Clifford	Episode: "Barney Hosts a Summit Meeting"
1991	Law & Order	Thad Messimer	Episode: "In Memory Of"
1999	Law & Order	Darryl Grady	Episode: "Ramparts"
