= 1918 (1985 film) =

1985 film

- Poster
- Directed by: Ken Harrison
- Written by: Horton Foote
- Produced by: Lillian V. Foote; Calvin Skaggs
- Starring: William Converse-Roberts; Hallie Foote; Matthew Broderick
- Cinematography: George Tirl
- Edited by: Leon Seith
- Distributed by: Cinecom Pictures
- Release date: 1985
- Running time: 94 minutes
- Country: United States
- Language: English

1918 (also known as Horton Foote's 1918) is a 1985 American drama film directed by Ken Harrison and starring William Converse-Roberts, Hallie Foote, and Matthew Broderick. It is based on the play 1918 by Horton Foote, who also wrote the screenplay for the film. It was followed by On Valentine's Day.

== Plot ==
It's 1918, the height of United States involvement in World War I: Liberty Bonds are sold, German immigrants are suspected as traitors or saboteurs, young men everywhere succumb to the patriotism and propaganda, and enlist. In a small Texas town, Horace Robedaux feels the pressure.

He does not want to leave his young wife Elizabeth and their young child Jenny, but Elizabeth's can't-do-anything-right younger brother Brother Vaughn constantly talks about the war. The young man sees the glory in battle and is eager to go to France and prove himself a hero. He later reveals to Elizabeth that he has flunked out of college due to drinking and partying and in so doing has got a fellow student pregnant. He begs Elizabeth for a loan so they can get an abortion and Elizabeth grudgingly gives him the money.

Elizabeth's stern father, who opposed the marriage initially, becomes proud of Horace when he learns his son in law bought an exhorbitant amount of bonds. Feeling he is preventing the younger man from joining the war effort he announces to Elizabeth and Horace that he will allow Horace to go fight and take Brother with him and in so doing he will take care of his daughter and their young daughter. However, the Spanish flu influenza epidemic is sweeping the town (and the United States) and a lot of the townsfolk are succumbing to the disease.

Horace and Elizabeth catch the flu and manage to recover however their young daughter succumbs devastating the young married couple. While they recuperate they learn that an armistice has been signed and Germany has surrendered. Brother can no longer go to war but his father decides the younger man needs to get a job and sends him off to work on a ship, which excites the young man.

As the town welcomes the soldiers back from the war, Elizabeth is now pregnant with a second child and mourning her first born. Horace returns to work. He is recalled to his home as Elizabeth gives birth to their son. He declare his love for Elizabeth. They learn Brother has again gotten into trouble, his parents finally tell the young man off and force him to continue onto Galviston and his new career on the cotton boats.

The film closes looking at the grave of Horace and Elizabeth's young daughter as Elizabeth falls asleep cradling their son.

== Cast ==
- William Converse-Roberts as Horace Robedaux
- Hallie Foote as Elizabeth Robedaux
- Rochelle Oliver as Mrs. Mary Vaughn
- Michael Higgins as Mr. Vaughn
- Matthew Broderick as Brother Vaughn
- Jeanne McCarthy as Bessie Stillman
- Bill McGhee as Sam the Cemetery Worker
- L.T. Felty as Mr. Thatcher
- Horton Foote Jr. as Jessie
- Tom Murrel as Stanley
