= Matt Mulhern =

American actor (born 1960)

- Born: July 21, 1960 (age 66); Philadelphia, Pennsylvania, U.S.
- Education: Rutgers University, New Brunswick (BFA); City College of New York (MA); Fordham University
- Occupation: Actor
- Years active: 1986–2015 (acting)
- Spouse: Karen Sellon (m. 1988)
- Children: 2, including Jack Mulhern

Matt Mulhern (born July 21, 1960) is an American actor and historian who has starred in such films as One Crazy Summer and Biloxi Blues, and such television series such as Major Dad, JAG, and Rescue Me (playing Lt. John Stackhouse).

Mulhern attended Pascack Hills High School in Montvale, New Jersey.

Mulhern was trained as an actor by William Esper at Mason Gross School of the Arts of Rutgers University, where he received a BFA in Acting in 1982. He was first cast as Joseph Wykowski in Neil Simon's Tony Award winning Biloxi Blues. From there, he went on to a film, TV, and theater career as an actor, appearing in films such as One Crazy Summer, Extreme Prejudice, Biloxi Blues, Junior, Walking to the Waterline, Infinity, The Sunchaser, and others.

New York theater credits include: The One-Armed Man at Ensemble Studio Theater, Surviving Grace at the Union Square Theater, The Night Hank Williams Died at the Orpheum Theater, Wasted at the WPA. Regional appearances at the La Jolla Playhouse in The Glass Menagerie, The Habitation of Dragons, at Pittsburgh Public Theater, the National Tour of Death of a Salesman as Biff opposite Hal Holbrook, and The Orphans Home Cycle at Hartford Stage.

On TV, Mulhern played Lieutenant Eugene "Gene" Holowachuk on the top-ten CBS hit Major Dad from 1989 through 1993. Other guest appearances include NBC's Third Watch, Law and Order, Law and Order: Criminal Intent, Law and Order: Special Victims Unit,The Education of Max Bickford and Ed; a recurring role on FX's Rescue Me; and appearances on Fox's Fringe; and CBS's CSI, Blue Bloods.

He has written and directed two films, Walking to the Waterline, in which he also acted, and Duane Hopwood, starring David Schwimmer, which Roger Ebert named one of 2005's best films.

He also wrote a novel, Crossing Open Spaces, published by CreateSpace in March 2009.

After a 35-year career he left acting, writing, and directing in 2015, and received a master's degree in history from City College-CUNY in 2019. He is currently pursuing a PhD. in history at Fordham University.

Mulhern lives north of New York City with his wife. They have two sons, including Jack.

== Filmography ==
Year	Title	Role	Notes
1986	Dallas: The Early Years	Garrison Southworth	TV movie
1986	One Crazy Summer	Teddy Beckersted	
1986–1987	The Ellen Burstyn Show	Mikey	2 episodes
1987	Extreme Prejudice	Staff Sergeant Declan Patrick Coker	
1987	Private Eye	Tommy Dade	Episode: "High Heels and Silver Wings"
1988	Biloxi Blues	Private Joseph T. Wykowski	Reprisal of Broadway role
1988	Now I Know	Jim	
1989–1993	Major Dad	Lieutenant Gene Holowachuk	96 episodes
1992	Gunsmoke: To the Last Man	Will McCall	TV movie
1994	Terror in the Night	Tom Cross	TV movie
1994	Murder, She Wrote	Walter Perry	Episode: "Deadly Assets"
1994	A Burning Passion: The Margaret Mitchell Story	John Marsh	TV movie
1994	Junior	Mover	
1996	The Sunchaser	Dr. Chip Byrnes	
1996	Infinity	Gate Guard	
1998	Walking to the Waterline	Francis McGowan	Also director and writer
1999	Third Watch	Stanley, Faith's Brother	Episode: "History of the World"
2000	Young Americans	Charlie	2 episodes
2000	Law & Order	Officer Pete Bennett	Episode: "Standoff"
2001	18 Wheels of Justice	Sheriff	Episode: "Honor Thy Father"
2001	JAG	Lieutenant Commander Stinson	Episode: "Valor"
2001	Ed	Coach Gale	Episode: "Replacements"
2002	The Education of Max Bickford	Officer Will Coleman	Episode: "Past, Present, Future"
2003	Law & Order: Special Victims Unit	Officer Greg Kendall	Episode: "Risk"
2003	Queens Supreme	Mr. Sutton	Episode: "Let's Make a Deal"
2005	Duane Hopwood	—N/a	Director and writer
2006	Rescue Me	Lieutenant John Stackhouse	3 episodes
2006	Law & Order: Criminal Intent	Officer Sajak	Episode: "Siren Call"
2007	Trainwreck: My Life as an Idiot	Andy	
2008	Law & Order	Chief Baranek	Episode: "Illegal"
2009	Fringe	Dennis	Episode: "Inner Child"
2010	CSI: Crime Scene Investigation	Plant Manager	Episode: "Bump and Grind"
2014	Blue Bloods	Steve Brandt	Episode: "Power of the Press"
