= Rochelle Oliver =

American acting coach and actress (1937–2024)

- Born: April 15, 1937; New York City, U.S.
- Died: April 13, 2024 (aged 86); New York City, U.S.
- Occupations: Acting coach; actress
- Years active: 1959–2003 (acting)
- Spouses: James Patterson (m. 1959; died 1972) Fritz Weaver (m. 1997; died 2016)
- Children: 1

Rochelle Oliver (April 15, 1937 – April 13, 2024) was an American acting coach and actress.

== Early life and career ==
Oliver studied acting with Uta Hagen. Her stage appearances include The Brothers Karamazov, The Cave Dwellers, The Diary of Anne Frank and Toys in the Attic, the latter of which earned her a Clarence Derwent Award in 1960.

In 1958, she appeared on television in the "Saw My Baby There" episode of Naked City. In 1963, she played the part of Jean Lowell in the episode "The Noose" from The Defenders. In 1970, she had a recurring role as Barbara Lamont in the series The Best of Everything. In 1976, she played the part of Dr. Marsha in Paul Mazursky's Next Stop, Greenwich Village. From 1993 to 2003, she appeared as Judge Grace Larkin in Law & Order.

Oliver had been teaching acting since the 1970s. She was on the faculty of HB Studio in New York City until her death in 2024.

== Personal life and death ==
Oliver was Jewish. In 1959, she married actor James Patterson, with whom she had a son. They remained together until his death in 1972. In 1997, Oliver married actor Fritz Weaver. They remained together until Weaver's death in 2016.

Oliver died in New York City on April 13, 2024, two days before her 87th birthday.

== Filmography ==
Film
Title	Year	Role	Director	Notes
The Happy Hooker	1975	Norma	Nicholas Sgarro	
Next Stop, Greenwich Village	1976	Doctor Marsha	Paul Mazursky	
Lianna	1983	Betty	John Sayles	
In Defense of Kids	1983	Mrs. Giankanis	Gene Reynolds	TV movie
1918	1985	Mrs. Mary Vaughn	Ken Harrison	
On Valentine's Day	1986	Mrs. Vaughn	Ken Harrison	
Courtship	1987	Mrs Vaughn	Howard Cummings	
The Appointments of Dennis Jennings	1988	Woman on TV	Dean Parisot	Short
An Unremarkable Life	1989	Mary Alice	Amin Q. Chaudhri	
Scent of a Woman	1992	Gretchen	Martin Brest	
Hollywood Ending	2002	Script supervisor	Woody Allen	

Television shows
Title	Episode	Role	Director	Year / Air date	Notes
Naked City	"Four Sweet Corners"	Cora Gary	Stuart Rosenberg	April 28, 1959	
Naked City	"Saw My Baby There "	Katie Harris	Stuart Rosenberg	June 9, 1959	
The United States Steel Hour	"Little Lost Sheep"		Ernest Kinoy	November 1, 1961	
The Defenders	"The Noose"	Jean Lowell	Stuart Rosenberg	April 27, 1963	
The Nurses	"Credo"	Sally Ellis	Stuart Rosenberg	January 9, 1964	
The Defenders	"The Objector"	Anne Wendel	Leonard Horn	February 11, 1965	
The Best of Everything	Barbara Lamont	Episode #1.1		March 30, 1970	Writer: James Lipton; Producer: Jacqueline Babbin
The Best of Everything	Barbara Lamont	Episode #1.112	Dennis Kane	September 7, 1970	
The Best of Everything	Barbara Lamont	Episode #1.114	Alan Pultz	September 9, 1970	
Ryan's Hope	Episode #1.838	Jeri Jerome	Lela Swift	September 25, 1978	
ABC Afterschool Specials	Mrs. York	"Amy & the Angel"	Ralph Rosenblum	September 22, 1982	
Tribeca	"The Hopeless Romantic"	Blanche	Barry Primus	April 6, 1993	
Law & Order	"Manhood"	Judge Grace Larkin	Ed Sherin	May 12, 1993	
Law & Order	"Big Bang"	Judge Grace Larkin	Dann Florek	March 2, 1994	
Law & Order	"Competence"	Judge Grace Larkin	Fred Gerber	November 2, 1994	
All My Children	Episode dated 20 June 1995	Alice Hart		June 20, 1995	
Law & Order	"Paranoia"	Judge Grace Larkin	Fred Gerber	November 15, 1995	
Law & Order	"Family Business "	Judge Grace Larkin	Lewis Gould	November 20, 1996	
Law & Order	"Faccia a Faccia"	Judge Grace Larkin	Martha Mitchell	February 25, 1998	
Law & Order	"Ill-Conceived"	Judge Grace Larkin	David Platt	December 3, 2003	
