= Hallie Foote =

American actress

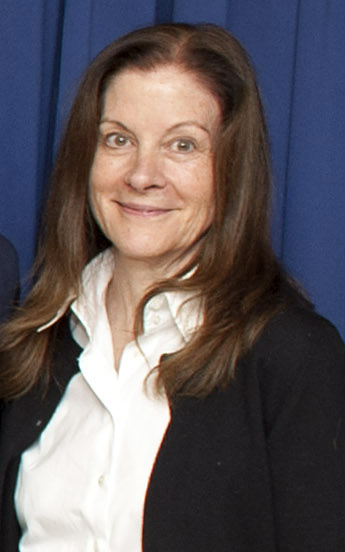
- Foote in 2014
- Born: Barbara Hallie Foote; March 31, 1950 (age 76); Manhattan, New York, U.S.
- Occupation: Actress
- Years active: 1979-present
- Spouse: Devon Abner (1994-present)

Barbara Hallie Foote (born March 31, 1950) is an American actress.

== Life and career ==
Born Barbara Hallie Foote in Manhattan, the daughter of Lillian Vallish Foote and writer and director Horton Foote, she was raised in Nyack, New York and New Hampshire.

Foote began her stage career in 1982, when she was cast in the role of "Sophia" in A Little Family Business on Broadway, starring Angela Lansbury. Foote also understudied two roles in that production. In 1986 she played the title role of her father's off-Broadway play The Widow Claire, which featured Matthew Broderick, Dan Butler, and Sarah Michelle Gellar. Father and daughter later collaborated on Talking Pictures, Night Seasons, Laura Dennis, When They Speak of Rita, The Last of the Thorntons, The Carpetbagger's Children, The Day Emily Married, The Trip to Bountiful, for which she won the Lucille Lortel Award for Outstanding Featured Actress and was nominated for the Outer Critics Circle Award for Outstanding Featured Actress in a Play, and Dividing the Estate, for which she won the 2008 Richard Seff Award and was nominated for the 2009 Tony Award for Best Featured Actress in a Play. She was appearing in the Hartford Stage production of her father's theatrical adaptation of the Harper Lee novel To Kill a Mockingbird when he died.

Foote appeared in The Orphans' Home Cycle off-Broadway in 2009, receiving an Outer Critics Circle Award nomination, Outstanding Featured Actress in a Play. In 2012, Foote appeared as Dolores and Mrs. Crawford in the off-Broadway production of Harrison, TX: Three Plays by Horton Foote with Primary Stages. She then appeared as Pauline in the Primary Stages production of Him. Foote also played Rosalynn Carter in the 2014 production of Camp David at Arena Stage, the performance was attended by Rosalynn Carter herself, as well as President Jimmy Carter.

Foote also won the Obie Award in 1993 and the Drama League Award in 2000 and 2002 and was nominated for the 1995 Drama Desk Award for Outstanding Featured Actress in a Play for The Horton Foote Plays.

Foote's movie career has been limited to small roles in C.H.U.D., Walking to the Waterline, Friends with Money, and Paranormal Activity 3, among others. Her television appearances include Miami Vice, Murder, She Wrote, and Law & Order and the television movies The Habitation of Dragons and Alone, both written by her father.

== Personal life ==
Foote is married to actor/screenwriter Devon Abner and is the sister of playwright/screenwriter Daisy Foote.

== Filmography ==
=== Film ===
Year	Film	Role	Notes
1984	C.H.U.D.	Waitress	
1985	1918	Elizabeth Robedaux	
1986	On Valentine's Day	Elizabeth Robedaux	
1987	Courtship	Elizabeth Vaughn	
1998	Walking to the Waterline	Lucy Bammer	
2006	Friends with Money	Woman	
2011	Paranormal Activity 3	Grandma Lois	
2014	Paranormal Activity: The Marked Ones	Grandma Lois	Uncredited, only a photo
2015	Paranormal Activity: The Ghost Dimension	Grandma Lois	

=== Television ===
Year	Show	Role	Notes
1979	Orphan Train	Nellie	TV movie
1986	American Playhouse	Agnes Wood	Roanoak: Part I
1986	Miami Vice	Laura Kaplan	1 episode
1987	Little Match Girl	Mary-Margaret Dutton	TV movie
1988	Hothouse	Rose	3 episodes
1991	Separate but Equal	Julia Davis	TV movie
1992	The Habitation of Dragons	Margaret Tolliver	TV movie
1992–1993	Murder, She Wrote	Margaret Johnson / Sylvia Moffett	2 episodes
1994	Gunsmoke: One Man's Justice	Hannah Miller	TV movie
1995	The Client	Caroline Hutchinson	1 episode
1995–2002	Law & Order	Marjorie Durban, Margaret Chapman	2 episodes
1996	Relativity		1 episode
1996	Sliders	Lady Mary	1 episode
1997	Alone	Agnes	TV movie
1998	Promised Land	Olivia Milner	1 episode
1999	Strange World		1 episode

=== Stage ===
Year	Title	Role	Notes
1982	A Little Family Business	Sophia	Martin Beck Theatre, Broadway
1986	The Widow Claire	Claire	Circle in the Square Downtown, Off-Broadway
1994	Talking Pictures	Myra	Kampo Cultural Center, Off-Broadway
1994	Night Seasons	Laura Lee Weems	Signature Theatre Company, Off-Broadway
1995	Laura Dennis	Velma	Kampo Cultural Center, Off-Broadway
2000	When They Speak of Rita	Rita	Primary Stages, Off-Broadway
2000	The Last of the Thorntons	Alberta Thornton	Signature Theatre Company, Off-Broadway
2002	The Carpetbagger's Children	Sissie	Lincoln Center Theatre, Off-Broadway
2004	The Day Emily Married	Emily	Primary Stages, Off-Broadway
2005	The Trip to Bountiful	Jessie Mae	Signature Theatre Company, Off-Broadway
2008	Dividing the Estate	Mary Jo	Booth Theatre, Broadway
2009	To Kill a Mockingbird	Jean Louise Finch	Hartford Stage
2009	The Death of Papa	Elizabeth Robedaux	Hartford Stage
2010	The Orphans' Home Cycle	Mrs. Vaughn	Signature Theatre Company, Off-Broadway
2012	Harrison, TX: Three Plays by Horton Foote	Dolores and Mrs. Crawford	Primary Stages, OFf-Broadway
2012	Him	Pauline	59E59 Theater, Off-Broadway
2013	The Old Friends	Sibyl Borden	Pershing Square Signature Center, Off-Broadway
2016	Camp David	Rosalynn Carter	Old Globe Theatre
2016	The Roads to Home	Mabel Votaugh	Cherry Lane Theatre, Off-Broadway
