= Walking to the Waterline =

- Directed by: Matt Mulhern
- Written by: Matt Mulhern
- Produced by: Ron Kastner; Lemore Syvan
- Starring: Matt Mulhern; Hallie Foote; Alan Ruck; Beverly Archer; Jon Cypher; Matthew Broderick; Hal Holbrook; Jim Fyfe; Michael Boatman
- Cinematography: Kurt Lenning
- Edited by: Steve Silkensen
- Music by: David Wilcox
- Distributed by: Porchlight Entertainment (international)
- Release date: June 13, 1998
- Running time: 100 minutes
- Country: United States
- Language: English

Walking to the Waterline is a 1998 American drama film written and directed by Matt Mulhern and starring Matt Mulhern, Alan Ruck, Matthew Broderick, and Hallie Foote. The film premiered at the Florida Film Festival on June 13, 1998. The film aired in heavy rotation on IFC.

== Premise ==
Once a successful television sitcom star, Francis McGowan is now a struggling actor who returns to his family home on the Jersey Shore to sell it following his father's death. While there, he interacts with his agent Michael Woods, his childhood friend Duane Hopwood, and tour guide Lucy Bammer, with whom he drifts into a casual affair while his wife and children wait for him to return home.

== Cast ==
- Matt Mulhern as Francis McGowan
- Alan Ruck as Duane Hopwood
- Matthew Broderick as Michael Woods
- Hallie Foote as Lucy Bammer
- Jon Cypher as Fred Blumquist
- Hal Holbrook as Man on the Beach
- Beverly Archer as Pam Whitman
- Michael Boatman as Marshall

== Production ==
Walking to the Waterline was Matt Mulhern's directorial debut and was filmed during 1997 in Ocean City and Atlantic City, New Jersey. His sophomore effort, the 2005 drama Duane Hopwood, focused on one of the supporting characters he created for this film.

Mulhern starred in the film and was able to enlist Ruck, Broderick, Holbrook, and Boatman to the cast as they were friends of his.

== Release ==
Walking to the Waterline premiered at the Florida Film Festival on June 13, 1998.

== Critical reception ==
Josh Ralske of TV Guide reviewed the film, writing "There's a sweet underlying sadness to the film, but it's much too soft around the edges."
