= The Orphans' Home Cycle =

Plays by Horton Foote

The Orphans' Home Cycle is a 3-play drama written by Horton Foote. Each of the three plays in the trilogy comprises three one-act plays. They are The Story of a Childhood (Part 1), The Story of a Marriage (Part 2), and The Story of a Family (Part 3).

The plays focus on Horace Robedaux, whose character was inspired by Foote's father, from Texas, at the turn of the 20th Century to the beginning of the Depression. The plays follow Horace through three decades, as "seen through three generations of three families."

== Productions ==
Most of the individual plays had been produced previously, either on stage, in film, or for television. Hartford Stage and the Signature Theatre Company co-produced the cycle. Foote said "It's incredibly moving to see all of these plays from my years of writing come together into the theatrical cycle that I've always envisioned."

The cycle was produced at the Hartford Stage, Hartford, Connecticut, in September 2009 through October 2009. The cycle ran in repertory off-Broadway at the Signature Theatre Company from November 19, 2009 (Part 1), December 17, (Part 2), and January 26, (Part 3) through May 8, 2010. They (collectively) won the Lucille Lortel Award for Outstanding Play.

The director was Michael Wilson, sets by Jeff Cowie and David M. Barber, and costumes by David C. Woolard. An original score was composed by John Gromada. The cast included Bill Heck, Maggie Lacey, Annalee Jefferies, Emily Robinson, Hallie Foote, Pamela Payton-Wright, and Dylan Riley Snyder.

In April 2016, Baylor University's Theatre Department put on the first ever consecutive reading of all nine plays in the cycle, bookending its full-fledged production of Story of a Marriage. Horton Foote had a long relationship with Baylor's Department of Theatre Arts and was a good friend of Dr. Marion Castleberry, a graduate professor at the University and Foote's biographer as well as director of the Cycle.

== The plays ==
Part 1, The Story of a Childhood, 1902-1911

Act 1: Roots in a Parched Ground, 1902-1903; Act 2: Convicts, 1904; Act 3 Lily Dale, 1911.

- Roots in a Parched Ground was first presented on the television show "DuPont Show of the Month", in 1962 under the title The Night of the Storm. The cast featured Julie Harris as Julia, E. G. Marshall as Jim Howard, and Mildred Dunnock as Grandma Robedaux.
- Convicts was made into a film and released in 1991, with Robert Duvall as Soll Gautier and Lukas Haas as Horace Robedaux.
- Lily Dale ran off-Broadway at the Samuel Beckett Theatre from November 20, 1986 to February 15, 1987. The cast featured Molly Ringwald as Lily, later replaced by Mary Stuart Masterson. It was also televised in the "Hallmark Hall of Fame" series in 1996, with Masterson as Lily.

Part 2, The Story of a Marriage, 1912–1917

Act 1: The Widow Claire; Act 2: Courtship; Act 3: Valentine's Day

- The Widow Claire was produced off-Broadway at the Circle in the Square Theatre from December 17, 1986 to April 26, 1987, with Matthew Broderick as Horace Robedaux and Hallie Foote as Widow Claire.
- Courtship was filmed in 1987 with William Converse-Roberts as Horace Robedaux.
- Valentine's Day was filmed and released in 1986 with Matthew Broderick as Brother, William Converse-Roberts as Horace Robedaux, and Hallie Foote as Elizabeth Robedaux.

Part 3, The Story of a Family, 1918 to 1928

Act 1: 1918; Act 2: Cousins; Act 3: The Death of Papa.

- 1918 was produced in the 1990–91 season at the American Conservatory Theater, San Francisco, California.
- Cousins was first produced in 1983 at the Loft Theatre, Los Angeles, California.
- Death of Papa premiered in 1997 at the Playmakers' Repertory Company, Chapel Hill, North Carolina, with Matthew Broderick and Ellen Burstyn. It was produced by the Hartford Stage in June 1999 with Frankie Muniz as Horace Robedaux Jr., Hallie Foote as Elizabeth Robedaux, and Dana Ivey as Mary Vaughn.

== Critical response ==
Ben Brantley in The New York Times wrote of The Story of a Marriage that they "are both the starkest and most sentimental of this lovingly painted life-and-times portrait."

John Simon called the cycle "absorbing and uplifting", and noted that it was "suffused with Foote’s almost uncanny humanity in portraying besetting hardships and hard-won victories, disheartening letdowns and dogged loyalties. Foote has a smiling empathy with all people."

== Awards and nominations ==
Drama Desk Award

- Special Award, To the cast, creative team and producers of Horton Foote’s epic The Orphans' Home Cycle (winner)
- Outstanding Actor in a Play, Bill Heck (nominee)

Outer Critics Circle Award

- Outstanding New Off-Broadway Play (winner)
- Outstanding Director of a Play, Michael Wilson (winner)
- Outstanding Actor in a Play, Bill Heck (nominee)
- Outstanding Featured Actor in a Play, James DeMarse (nominee)
- Outstanding Featured Actress in a Play, Hallie Foote (nominee)

New York Drama Critics' Circle

- Best Play (winner)

American Theatre Wing Henry Hewes Award for Design "Notable Effects- for outstanding Production Design", David M. Barber, Jeff Cowie, David Woolard, Rui Rita, John Gromada, Jan Hartley (winners)
