= First Born (2007 film) =

- Film poster
- Directed by: Isaac Webb
- Written by: Isaac Webb
- Produced by: Rick Schwartz; Lemore Syvan
- Starring: Elisabeth Shue; Steven Mackintosh
- Cinematography: Alejandro Martínez
- Edited by: John Gilroy
- Music by: John Frizzell
- Production companies: Blueprint Films; Elevation Filmworks; Initial Entertainment Group (IEG)
- Distributed by: Virtual Films
- Release date: March 20, 2007
- Running time: 95 minutes
- Country: United States
- Language: English

First Born is a 2007 American drama film directed by Isaac Webb.

== Plot ==
Laura is an artistic dancer married to a wealthy businessman in New York City. She suspects she is pregnant after she gets ill following a dance performance. She takes the subway home, and while she is on the subway she sees a young woman sitting across from her holding a baby. After a moment, she looks back and the young woman is gone but has left the baby behind. Alarmed, Laura jumps up and runs over to the baby but it is just a doll wrapped in a blanket and she hears an echo of a baby crying in the background. Laura gets a pregnancy test from the drug store, having taken the doll from the subway home with her. Later that night, she and her husband Steven share their good news: he has made a partnership at his firm and she is pregnant. After moving and settling down in the countryside, Laura becomes haunted by the cry of a baby continuously and it often affects her emotional health. One day while talking to her mother on the phone, she puts her dog in the basement but later it dies when it ingested rat poison that she had laid out for mice she had seen earlier. Upon hearing the baby's cries, she trips and her water breaks, forcing her to drive herself to the hospital. With complications to labor, Laura goes into an emergency C-section and gives birth to a girl. She visits the nursery area, but cannot help bring herself to be as happy as the new mothers inside.

At home, Laura is having insomnia and struggles with pumping breast milk for her baby. Her mother assures her that postpartum depression is very common and tells her to make sure that Steve is helping her with their baby. However, she refuses to bother him as he has continued to work long hours. She goes to check the basement one day but the door is broken and she is locked down there all day until Steven arrives home to open the door for her. When Laura insists that their baby hates her, Steven hires an au pair named Mrs. Kasperian who has been a kind company to Laura.

Later that week, Steven insists that Laura come to his company's dinner event. Laura becomes frantic about preparing for the dinner event and panics when she sees some gray hairs. She takes her baby infant to the store to buy hair dye, but after setting her hair, she does not see the baby in the house, eventually finding the baby still in the car. She is upset with herself and holds her baby until nighttime when Mrs. Kasperian arrives. Mrs. Kasperian tries to comfort her on being a new mother after seeing hair dye still in her hair. After Steve calls angrily that Laura is late to the dinner event, Laura cuts her hair when her hair begins to fall out from the hair dye. She gets to the event improperly dressed but leaves almost immediately when she felt people were talking about her with an irate Steve taking her home.

Laura starts to suffer from nightmares, the doctor gives her sleeping pills to help her sleep at night, disregarding her other complaints. At home, Laura's consciousness drifts in and out of reality, while still visibly bothered by baby cries throughout the house. She looks through the baby monitor and sees Mrs. Kasperian pulling out a butcher's knife from the baby's crib. The two get into a verbal altercation where Mrs. Kasperian is very worried about Laura's mental health, believing that she had put the butcher knife there, and Laura eventually calls the police and chases her out. However, the police vouch for Mrs. Kasperian. The same evening, she continues to be haunted by the presence of an intruder in the house yet never really sees this intruder and hides her baby in the closet. Steven and the police are called back home where the police cannot find an intruder and inform him that Mrs. Kasperian found the butcher knife in the crib. Steven now realizes that Laura is mentally unwell.

With some research, she learns that hallucinations of mice and baby dolls may be related to witchcraft. Once getting home, she sees her baby covered in mice and she violently shakes the baby to get the mice off; Steven is petrified when she sees her shaking the baby, revealing that there are no mice present. He takes her to the emergency room, and the doctor believes she is suffering from postpartum psychosis. To help relieve her, Steve takes a month off work, and Laura's mother stays with them to help babysit while Laura decides to take up dancing again. She hears the baby crying but sees no baby in the crib; seeing the baby doll on the dresser when Steven had picked it up after she tried to drown it earlier, Laura buries it under the lawn and then goes back to sleep with a smile on her face. The next morning, her mother and Steven are wondering where "Jessica" is, but Laura does not know who she is. He panics, calling Jessica's name throughout the house—it's presumed that Jessica was actually the baby doll that Laura buried.

== Cast ==
- Elisabeth Shue as Laura
- Steven Mackintosh as Steven
- Kathleen Chalfant as Mrs. Kasperian
- Khandi Alexander as Dierdre
- Anne Wolf as Samantha Lee
