= Zach Grenier =

American actor

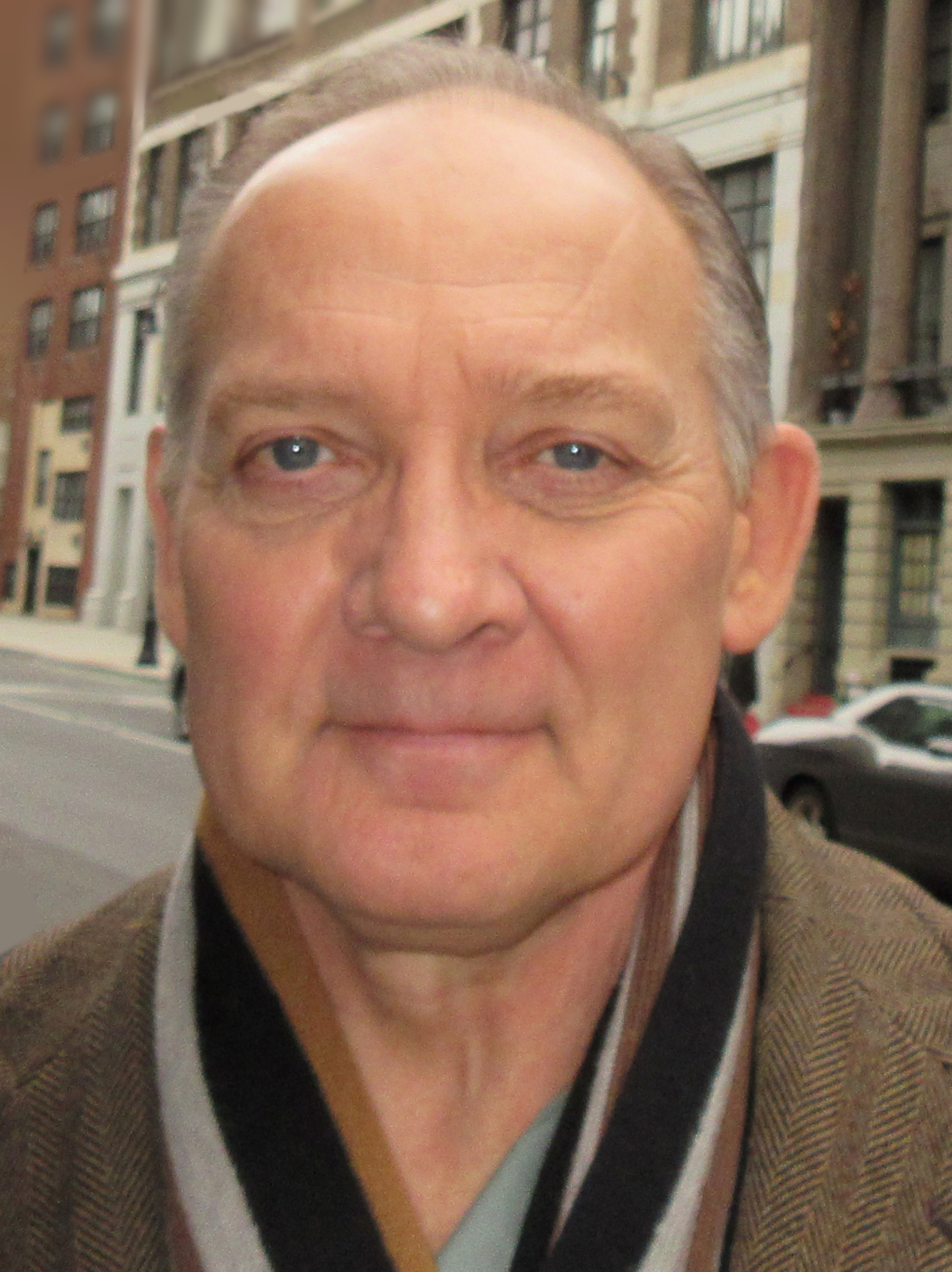
- Grenier in 2018
- Born: Englewood, New Jersey, U.S.
- Education: University of Michigan; Boston University
- Occupation: Actor
- Years active: 1986–present
- Website: zachgrenier.info

Zach Grenier is an American actor. He is known for his work with director David Fincher, and his roles as Andy Cramed on the television series Deadwood (2004–06) and David Lee on The Good Wife (2010–16) and its spinoff The Good Fight (2020–22). He has starred in various Broadway and Off-Broadway plays, and was nominated for a Tony Award for Best Featured Actor in a Play for 33 Variations.

== Early life and education ==
Grenier was born in Englewood, New Jersey. His mother, who was an announcer on a Polish-language radio program, met his father when he was working as a sound engineer at WBNX in the Bronx in the late 1930s. He is a graduate of Ann Arbor Pioneer High School.

He attended University of Michigan and Boston University.

== Career ==
Grenier was a regular cast member on C-16: FBI from 1997 to 1998. He appeared in the first season of the television show 24 as Carl Webb; played Andy Cramed, the gambler who brought the plague to town, on Deadwood; and appeared in several episodes of Law & Order.

In 2010, he was cast on the television series The Good Wife as David Lee, a senior attorney, a role that became part of the recurring ensemble. He was promoted to series regular at the start of the fifth season in September 2013.

Grenier has had a prolific career in film. He played Edward Norton's boss in Fight Club and Mel Nicolai in Zodiac, both David Fincher films. He appeared in the 1988 film Talk Radio as finance guru Sid Greenberg, a role he played in the original stage version of the script. In the film Twister, he played Eddie, Dr. Jonas Miller's assistant. He played Mr. Reilly, one of the Callahan Auto Parts associates, in Tommy Boy. He appeared in Donnie Brasco as a marriage therapist. He played the role of Professor Cardiff in the 2006 horror film Pulse.

In 2009, he appeared on Broadway opposite Jane Fonda in 33 Variations, earning a Tony Award nomination.

== Partial stage credits ==
Year	Title	Role(s)	Venue	Notes	Ref.
1986	The Tooth of Crime	Referee, Galactic Jack	Hartford Stage, Hartford		
1987	Talk Radio	Sid Greenberg, Caller	Public Theater, New York		
1989	Mastergate	Various	Criterion Center Stage Right, New York		
1991	The Resistible Rise of Arturo Ui	Emanuele Giri	Classic Stage Company Theatre, New York		
1992	Creditors	Gustav	Public Theater, New York		
1992	Woyzeck	Captain	Public Theater, New York		
1993	The Fiery Furnace	Louis	Lucille Lortel Theatre, New York		
1993	Born Guilty	Peter	Greenwald Theatre, New York		
1994	Three Birds Alighting on a Field	Yoyo, Boreman	New York City Center, New York		
1995	Uncle Vanya	Ivan Petrovich Voinitsky	Yale Repertory Theatre, New Haven		
1996	Rhinoceros	John	Theater Four, New York		
1997	A Question of Mercy	Dr. Robert Chapman	New York Theatre Workshop, New York		
1999	Voices in the Dark	Egan	Longacre Theatre, New York		
2004	Good Canary		Susan Stein Shiva Theater, Poughkeepsie	Workshop	
2006	Stuff Happens	Dick Cheney	Public Theater, New York		
2007	Tartuffe	Tartuffe	McCarter Theatre, Princeton		
2007	Tartuffe	Tartuffe	Yale Repertory Theatre, New Haven		
2008	A Man for All Seasons	Thomas Cromwell	Todd Haimes Theatre, New York		
2009	33 Variations	Ludwig van Beethoven	Eugene O'Neill Theatre, New York		
2009	33 Variations	Ludwig van Beethoven	La Jolla Playhouse, La Jolla		
2010	Lenin's Embalmers	Vlad	Ensemble Studio Theatre, New York		
2010	Gabriel	Von Pfunz	Linda Gross Theater, New York		
2011	Man and Boy	Mark Herries	Todd Haimes Theatre, New York		
2013	The Vandal	Man	Linda Gross Theater, New York		
2015	Doctor Faustus	Mephistopheles	Classic Stage Company Theatre, New York		
2017	Death of a Salesman	Willy Loman	O'Reilly Theater, New York		
2017	Describe the Night	Nikolai	Linda Gross Theater, New York		
2018	Kings	Sen. John McDowell	Public Theater, New York		
2018	Antigone in Ferguson		Harlem Stage Gatehouse, New York		

== Filmography ==
=== Film ===
Year	Title	Role	Notes
1988	Kenny	Jesse	
1988	Working Girl	Jim	
1989	See No Evil, Hear No Evil	Jerk	
1990	A Shock to the System	Executive	
1991	Problem Child 2	Voytek Claukinski	
1991	Delirious	Mickey	
1991	Liebestraum	Barnard Ralston IV	
1993	The Contenders	Transgender	
1993	Cliffhanger	Davis	
1993	The Man Without a Face	Dr. Lionel Talbot	
1995	Tommy Boy	Ted Reilly	
1995	Cafe Society	Milton Macka	
1995	Drunks	Al	
1995	Reckless	Anchor Person Trish	
1995	The Stars Fell on Henrietta	Larry Ligstow	
1996	Twister	Eddie	
1996	Mother Night	Joseph Goebbels	
1996	Maximum Risk	Ivan Dzasokhov	
1997	Donnie Brasco	Dr. Berger	
1997	White Lies	Terry Seabrooks	
1997	Under The Bridge	John	
1999	Ride With the Devil	Mr. Evans	
1999	Fight Club	Richard Chesler	
2000	Shaft	Harrison Loeb	
2000	Chasing Sleep	Geoffrey	
2001	Swordfish	Assistant Director Bill Joy	
2006	Pulse	Professor Cardiff	
2006	Rescue Dawn	Squad Leader	
2007	Zodiac	Mel Nicolai	
2007	Fantastic Four: Rise of the Silver Surfer	Mr. Sherman / Rafke	
2008	The Loss of a Teardrop Diamond	Mr. Fenstermaker	
2009	Earthwork	The Mayor	
2011	J. Edgar	John Condon	
2014	RoboCop	Senator Hubert Dreyfus	
2014	Free the Nipple	Jim Black	
2015	Manhattan Romance	Trevor	
2017	Crown Heights	Detective Cassel	
2022	She Said	Irwin Reiter	

=== Television ===
Year	Title	Role	Notes
1986	The Equalizer	Wirth	Episode: "A Community of Civilized Men"
1987–88	Kate & Allie	Engineer	2 episodes
1987, 1989	Miami Vice	Internal Affairs Officer, Eric Terry	Episode: "Theresa" and "Miracle Man"
1988–89	Tattingers	Sonny Franks	11 episodes
1989	A Man Called Hawk	Ken Whitewood	Episode: "Choice of Chance"
1989	The Equalizer	Pack	Episode: "The Caper"
1991	The Golden Girls	Vaczy	Episode: "The Case of the Libertine Belle"
1991–2026	Law & Order	Various characters	8 episodes
1993, 2000	NYPD Blue	Rudolf Wentz	Episode: "NYPD Lou"
1993, 2000	NYPD Blue	Detective Lou Simpkins	Episode: "Tea and Sympathy"
1994	Normandy: The Great Crusade	Robert Slaughter (voice)	TV movie
1994	The Cosby Mysteries		Episode: "Our Lady of Cement"
1995	New York News	Mike Paretti	Episode: "Forgotten"
1996	Gang in Blue	Joe Beckstrem	TV movie
1997–98	C-16	Jack DiRado	Main cast
1999	Ally McBeal	Attorney Benson	Episode: "Sex, Lies and Politics"
2000	Judging Amy	Dr. Norman Golden	Episode: "The Out-of-Towners"
2000	The Practice	Detective R. Larson	Episodes: "Summary Judgements" and "Show and Tell"
2001	Laughter on the 23rd Floor	Brian Doyle	TV movie
2001	The Whistle-Blower	Louis T. Weitzman	TV movie
2001	The X-Files	Dr. Herman Stites	Episode: "Alone"
2001	Curb Your Enthusiasm	Lane Michaelson	Episodes: "The Doll" and "The Massage"
2001–02	24	Carl Webb	9 episodes
2002	JAG	Colonel Boyett	Episode: "Code of Conduct"
2002	Without a Trace	Ricardo	Episode: "Pilot"
2002	Robbery Homicide Division	Skip Dayton	Episode: "2028"
2002	The Guardian	Henry Thomas	Episode: "The Living"
2002	Star Trek: Enterprise	Renth	Episode: "The Catwalk"
2003	Veritas: The Quest	Hossik	Episode: "Reunion"
2004	Touching Evil	FBI Special Agent Hank Enright	Main cast
2004	Dr. Vegas	Detective Rosen	Episode: "Limits"
2004	Crossing Jordan	Norman Farrell	Episode: "Fire in the Sky"
2004–06	Deadwood	Andy Cramed	9 episodes
2005	CSI: NY	Ross Howell	Episode: "Recycling"
2005	Medium	Professor Leonard Cardwell	Episode: "The Other Side of the Tracks"
2005–07	Boston Legal	U.S. Attorney Chris Randolph	2 episodes
2006	CSI: Miami	Professor Meyer	Episode: "Fade Out"
2006	Numb3rs	Peyton Shoemaker	Episode: "Provenance"
2006	The Nine	Sean McDermott	3 episodes
2007	Cold Case	Ambrose Stone in 1919	Episode: "Torn"
2007	CSI: Crime Scene Investigation	Dr. Kachler	Episode: "Dead Doll"
2009	The Philanthropist	Tyler Timson	Episode: "Kashmir"
2010–11	Law & Order: Special Victims Unit	Judge Miranski	2 episodes
2010–16	The Good Wife	David Lee	Recurring (seasons 1–4), regular (seasons 5–7); 62 episodes
2013	Zero Hour	Wayne Blanks	3 episodes
2014	The Blacklist	Novak	Episode: "Madeline Pratt (No. 73)"
2014	Turks & Caicos	Dido Parsons	TV movie
2016	BrainDead	Dean Healy	8 episodes
2017	Chicago P.D.	Father Bill McSorley	Episode: "Sanctuary"
2017	Blindspot	Herman	Episode: "Solos"
2017, 2020–22	The Good Fight	David Lee	Guest (seasons 1, 6); main role (seasons 4–5)
2018–19	Ray Donovan	Ed Feratti	6 episodes
2019	God Friended Me	James Abbott	Episode: "The Lady"
2020	Devs	Kenton	7 episodes
2022	FBI: Most Wanted	Vasily Matrushok	Episode: "Decriminalised"
2022	Killing It	Jim Gallant	Episode: "The Hard Place"
2024	FBI: International	Graham Simmons	Episode: "You'll Never See it Coming"
2025–26	FBI	Peter Olsen	3 episodes

== Awards and nominations ==
Award	Year	Category	Work	Result	Ref.
Drama Desk Award	2006	Outstanding Ensemble	Stuff Happens	Won	
Lucille Lortel Award	2013	Outstanding Featured Actor in a Play	Storefront Church	Nominated	
Outer Critics Circle Award	2009	Outstanding Featured Actor in a Play	33 Variations	Nominated	
Tony Award	2009	Best Featured Actor in a Play	33 Variations	Nominated	
