= The Midnight Caller (play) =

The Midnight Caller is a play by American playwright Horton Foote. The work was first performed in 1957 as part of a student production at the Neighborhood Playhouse with a cast including Robert Duvall. It had its professional premiere Off-Broadway at the Sheridan Square Playhouse where it opened on July 2, 1958. Directed by Leo Penn, the opening night cast included Mary James as Alma, Rebecca Dark as Cutie, Mary Perry as Rowena, Nora Dunfree as Mrs. Crawford, Justin Reed as Ralph, Patricia Frye as Helen, and Robert Morris as Harvey.
