= Duane Hopwood =

- Poster
- Directed by: Matt Mulhern
- Written by: Matt Mulhern
- Produced by: David T. Friendly; Melissa Marr; Lemore Syvan; Marc Turtletaub
- Starring: David Schwimmer; Janeane Garofalo; Judah Friedlander; Steve Schirripa; John Krasinski
- Cinematography: Mauricio Rubinstein
- Edited by: Tom McArdle
- Music by: Michael Rohatyn
- Production companies: Big Beach; Virtual Studios
- Distributed by: IFC Films
- Release dates: 20 January 2005 (Sundance Film Festival); 11 November 2005 (limited)
- Running time: 84 minutes
- Country: United States
- Language: English

Duane Hopwood is a 2005 American comedy-drama film written and directed by Matt Mulhern, and starring David Schwimmer, Janeane Garofalo, Judah Friedlander, John Krasinski and Steve Schirripa. After being featured in the Sundance Film Festival in January 2005, it later had a limited theatrical release in November 2005. The film's plot centers on the title character (Schwimmer), an alcoholic whose life is spiraling downward rapidly after his divorce from Linda (Garofalo).

== Plot ==
Duane Hopwood is a floor manager at Caesars Palace casino in Atlantic City, New Jersey. His slip into alcoholism has resulted in his divorce from his wife Linda, who holds custody over their two daughters, Mary and Katie, while Duane holds only visitation rights. One night, a drunken Duane is pulled over after swerving across the road, and it is discovered that Katie is in the backseat. Duane is banned from driving and is forced to borrow a bicycle from Linda as his main means of travel.

At the casino, Duane has to deal with a difficult customer, Mr. Alonso, whom he illegally gives a few quarters to play a few more slots, resulting in Alonso winning the jackpot prize. Duane later meets Linda and she tells him that Mary would like to talk to him and also informs him that her lawyer has suggested she revoke his visitation rights because of his drunk driving incident, but also expresses her own desire for Duane to refrain from drinking around their children. When Duane returns to the casino, he is taken into his boss Carl's office to explain his part in a disagreement between Alonso and an old lady, Mrs. Fillipi, who claims that she was initially using Alonso's machine and that she saw Duane give Alonso the quarters to use it. Duane falsely claims that it was Alonso's own money which was used to win the jackpot; Mrs. Fillipi loses the dispute.

Duane visits Mary, who tells him she wants to live with him due to Katie calling her fat and Linda's new boyfriend, Bob, encouraging her to go running and lose weight. Duane asks Linda if she will call off her lawyer if he stops drinking altogether. He later confronts her and Bob about the latter's role in Mary's unhappiness; the confrontation escalates and Duane picks up a baseball bat and moves towards Bob, but backs off and leaves after realising the children are watching. That night, Duane later goes to a bar and gets drunk, where he meets Gina, a bartender. She gives him a ride home, but rejects his drunken advances. However, her car fails to start, so she remains at his house overnight, and although Duane refrains from hitting on her any further, a mutual attraction grows. The next day, Carl shows Duane a tape of him giving the quarters to Alonso. Carl, under pressure from his own boss, is forced to fire Duane. Duane spends the rest of his day getting drunk, before going home and having sex with Gina. However, he admits to her that he still loves Linda, causing Gina to leave.

Duane attends a support group for his alcoholism, but becomes too emotional to stay for long. When he later attends the court hearing on his visitation rights, he explains to the judge that he needs to be able to see his daughters because they are the only thing he has left to live for. However, Linda's lawyer produces the bat that Duane had threatened Bob with. Shortly after the hearing, Duane's lawyer, Steve, grimly shows up on Duane's doorstep, saying simply "Let's talk." Fearing the worst, Duane drives to Linda's house but finds it empty. He later gets drunk, goes to his friend and housemate Anthony's stand-up gig at the casino and proceeds to ruin it, before being restrained and made to leave.

The next morning, Duane apologizes to Anthony for sabotaging his show. Linda turns up and explains that she, Bob and the two girls are moving to South Carolina, where Bob has a job co-running a gym. Duane accepts responsibility for the breakup of the family, and Linda asks him to come and say goodbye before the move, promising to arrange for him to visit the girls in South Carolina once they have settled. The next day, Linda, Bob and the two girls wait at the house for a while, but Duane does not show, so they drive off, only for Duane to cycle up next to the car, wearing a turkey costume that Anthony had used for one of his stand-up acts. After giving them all a proper goodbye, Duane contently watches them leave. Having moved on from Linda, Duane reunites with Gina, with whom he and Anthony attend a thanksgiving meal. The film ends with a scene of a toast, with everyone then drinking wine, except Duane, who drinks water.

== Cast ==
- David Schwimmer as Duane Hopwood
- Janeane Garofalo as Linda
- Judah Friedlander as Anthony
- John Krasinski as Bob Flynn
- Ramya Pratt as Mary Hopwood
- Rachel Covey as Katie Hopwood
- Jerry Grayson as Carl
- Steve Schirripa as Steve
- Susan Lynch as Gina
- Dick Cavett as Fred
- Bill Buell as Wally
- Brian Tarantina as Mr. Alonso
- Irma St. Paule as Mrs Fillipi

== Production ==
The movie was shot over 21 days in Atlantic City, Longport, Margate, Ocean City, and Ventnor, New Jersey.

Duane Hopwood was a character featured in director Mulhern's previous film, Walking to the Waterline, then played by Alan Ruck.

== Release ==
The film was featured in the Sundance Film Festival on 20 January 2005. It later received a limited theatrical release on 11 November of that year. IFC did not release the film in New York City or Los Angeles, focusing instead on Philadelphia, Tucson and Kansas City.

According to Box Office Mojo, the film grossed $13,510 domestically.

=== Home media ===
HBO released the DVD in April 2006.

== Reception ==
On the review aggregator website Rotten Tomatoes, 55% of 20 critics' reviews are positive, with an average rating of 5.7/10. The website's consensus reads: "Duane Hopwood proves David Schwimmer has dramatic chops that have been too rarely tested onscreen, but fails to engage as an overall viewing experience." On Metacritic, the film holds a score of 53 out of 100, based on seven reviews from mainstream critics, indicating "mixed or average" reviews.

Peter Sobczynski gave the film a highly negative review, regarding the character of Duane as unlikable. Sobczynski described the film as "a crock from beginning to end" and rated it one star out of five. J.R. Jones of The Chicago Reader commended the cast but criticized the comedic aspects. Scott Tobias of The A.V. Club called the film "middling" and unfavorably compared it to The Good Girl, featuring Schwimmer's Friends co-star, Jennifer Aniston.

Robert Koehler of Variety also compared the film to The Good Girl, albeit it in a much more positive light. Koehler praised the performances of the cast and the realistic characterization. Roger Ebert gave the film three and a half stars out of four and named it as one of the best movies of 2005. Ebert praised the film's portrayal of alcoholism and stated that Schwimmer gave "one of those performances that transform the way we think about an actor."
