= Dividing the Estate =

Play written by Horton Foote

- Playbill for the Broadway production
- Original language: English
- Written by: Horton Foote
- Characters: Stella; Mary Jo; Lucille; Lewis
- Subject: Three siblings squabble over their inheritance
- Genre: Comedy
- Setting: Harrison, Texas, 1987

Premiere
- Date: 1989
- Place: McCarter Theater; New Jersey

Dividing the Estate is a play by Horton Foote. The play premiered at the McCarter Theatre in 1989 and Off-Broadway in 2007, winning the Outer Critics Circle Award for Outstanding New Off-Broadway Play.

== Overview ==
Set in the fictional town of Harrison, Texas, in 1987, it focuses on the Gordons, a clan of malcontents ruled by octogenarian matriarch Stella that must prepare for an uncertain future when plunging real estate values and an unexpected tax bill have a negative impact on the family fortune. Stella's children - predatory Mary Jo, complacent Lucille, and alcoholic Lewis - engage in a debate about whether or not they should divide the estate while their mother is still alive in order to ensure themselves financial independence.

== Productions ==
The play premiered at the McCarter Theatre in New Jersey in 1989. Presented by Primary Stages Theater, it opened on September 27, 2007 at the Off-Broadway 59E59 Theaters, where it ran until October 27. Directed by Michael Wilson, the cast included Elizabeth Ashley as Stella, Hallie Foote as Mary Jo, Penny Fuller as Lucille, and Gerald McRaney as Lewis.

Horton Foote won the Outer Critics Circle Award for Outstanding New Off-Broadway Play and the Obie Award for Playwriting.

The production transferred to Broadway for a limited engagement with its original cast presented by the Lincoln Center Theater Company and Primary Stages Theater. It began previews at the Booth Theatre on October 23, 2008, officially opened on November 20, and closed on January 4, 2009 after 50 performances and 31 previews.

== Critical response ==
In his review in The New York Times, Ben Brantley called the play "deeply funny" and stated, "Mr. Foote's authorial gaze is focused with satiric sharpness while retaining its elegiac sense of life's transience." David Rooney of Variety thought it was "distinctly old-fashioned . . . with an air of familiarity" but added, "Spend time with Foote's richly human characters and concerns about the play's dustiness quickly fade. The Chekhovian intrusion of past upon present, the melancholy acknowledgement of a world in decline, the gentle but tart humor, the clear-eyed compassion tinged with despair - these qualities remind us why the 91-year-old playwright remains such a distinctively expressive voice in contemporary American drama."

Joe Dziemianowicz of the New York Daily News said the play "goes for laughs and succeeds, and at the same time comments on more sweeping notions of avarice, entitlement and carpetbagging karma. It's not as profound or ambitious as Broadway's other multigenerational melee, August: Osage County, but Foote's fine play does go down easy." In USA Today, Elysa Gardner observed, "The folks we meet in Estate . . . can be immensely irritating, but they're not, well, bad people — or, truth be told, terribly interesting ones."

== Awards and nominations ==
Award nominations for Dividing the Estate
Year	Award	Category	Nominee(s)	Result	Ref.
2009	Tony Award	Best Play	Dividing the Estate	Nominated	
2009	Tony Award	Best Performance by a Featured Actress in a Play	Hallie Foote	Nominated	
