= Signature Theatre Company =

American theatre in New York

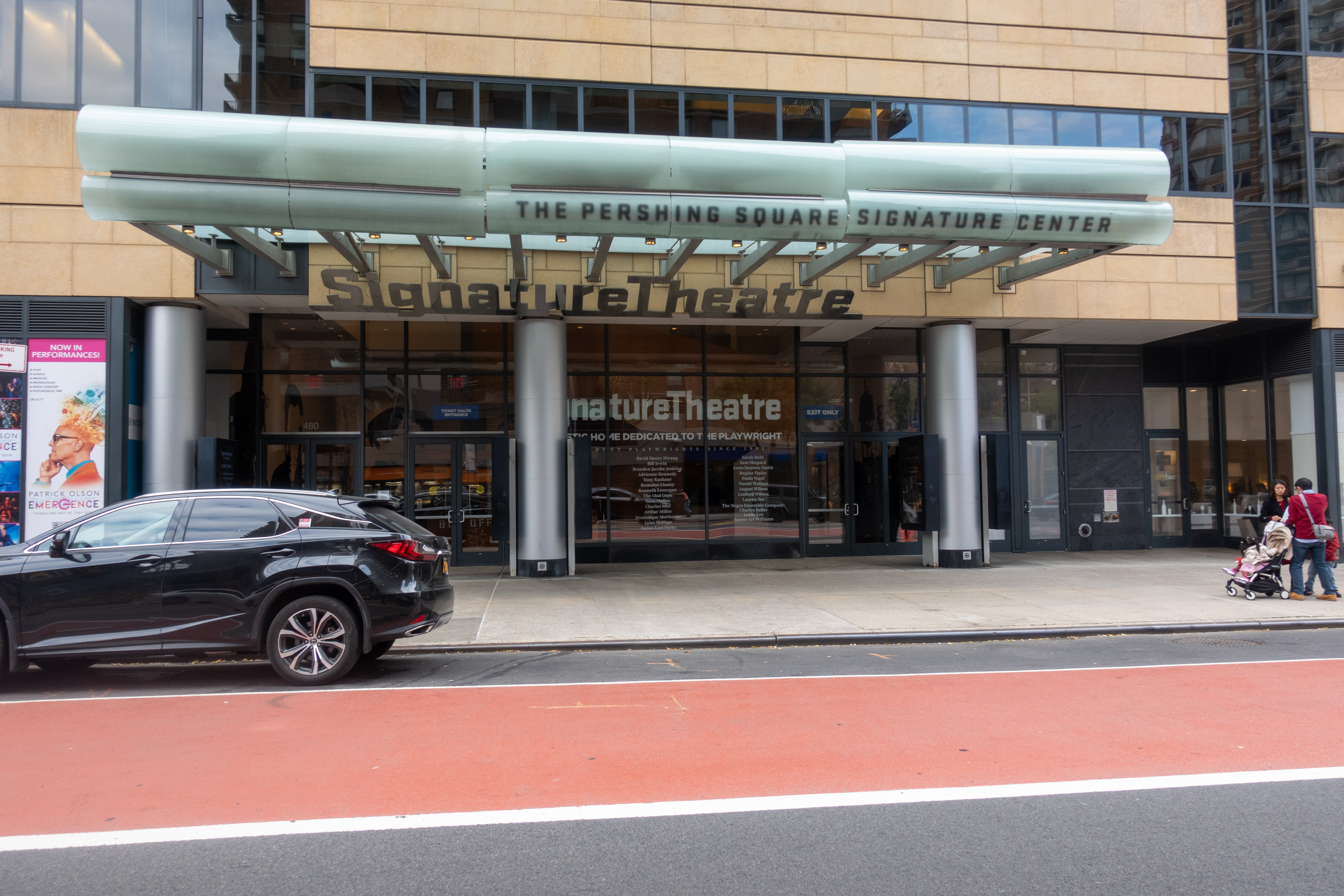
- Pershing Square Signature Center main entrance on 42nd Street
- Formation: 1991
- Founder: James Houghton
- Type: Off-Broadway
- Location: Pershing Square Signature Center, New York City
- Artistic director: Emily Shooltz
- Website: www.signaturetheatre.org

Signature Theatre Company is a nonprofit Off Broadway theatre company located on West 42nd Street in New York City. It was founded in 1991 by James Houghton and is now led by Artistic Director Emily Shooltz. Signature is known for their season-long focus on one artist's work. It has been located in the Pershing Square Signature Center since 2012.

== About ==
Signature has presented entire seasons of the work of Edward Albee, Lee Blessing, David Henry Hwang, Horton Foote, María Irene Fornés, Athol Fugard, John Guare, Bill Irwin, Adrienne Kennedy, Romulus Linney, Charles Mee, Arthur Miller, Sam Shepard, Paula Vogel, August Wilson, Lanford Wilson, A. R. Gurney, Naomi Wallace and a season celebrating the historic Negro Ensemble Company.

Among its programs are the Residency One Program, celebrating a single playwright with multiple productions over the course of a year, and Legacy Program, which brings those playwrights back for additional productions. Signature also introduced Residency Five, a program that will feature early- and mid-career playwrights and guarantee them three full productions over the course of a five-year residency. In honor of its 20th anniversary, Signature launched a subsidized ticketing initiative designed to improve Off Broadway accessibility.

Signature, its productions and its resident writers have been recognized with a Pulitzer Prize, a 2014 Regional Theatre Tony Award, eleven Lucille Lortel Awards, fifteen Obie Awards, five Drama Desk Awards, and thirty-two AUDELCO Awards. The National Theatre Conference recognized the company as the 2003 Outstanding National Theatre of the Year.

== History ==
James Houghton founded the theatre in a black box theater at 31 Bond Street in the NoHo neighborhood in 1991 at the Kampo Cultural Center (a venue that had focused on promoting Japanese calligraphy). The theatre focused on having a resident playwright of national stature with its first playwright Romulus Linney and Houghton led the company until just prior to his death in 2016.

In 1997 the theatre moved to 555 West 42nd Street on Theatre Row. In 1999 software developer Peter Norton donated $600,000 for renovations to the 42nd Street venue which was renamed Signature Theatre Company at the Peter Norton Space. Their lease at this location was scheduled to expire at the end of 2011, and the company began a search for a long term home.

In 2004 it was announced that the Signature had signed on to be an anchor tenant of a new $700 million performing arts center on the site of the destroyed World Trade Center site. It was to be designed by Gehry Partners LLP and Snøhetta. By 2007, plans for the WTC Performing Arts Center remained stalled, the city offered Fiterman Hall as a possible home, but that plan also fell through.

In October 2008, Signature announced the creation of the Pershing Square Signature Center, a block east of their former home, which opened in 2012 and was designed by Frank Gehry Architects, the architect's first project for a theatre company. The space reflected a significant increase in Signature's audience capacity. The Pearl Theatre moved into the old Signature space but that company declared bankruptcy in 2017.

Paige Evans took over for Houghton as Artistic Director in 2016, and in 2018, Harold Wolpert took over from Erika Mallin as Executive Director. Wolpert remained through June 30, 2021. In 2024 Emily Shoolz became Artistic Director.

== Awards and recognition ==
Tony Awards

- Regional Theatre Tony Award (2014)

Pulitzer Prize

- The Pulitzer Prize for Playwriting to Horton Foote for The Young Man from Atlanta (1995)

Obie Awards

- Romulus Linney, Sustained Achievement in Playwriting (1992)
- Edward Albee, Sustained Achievement in Playwriting (1994)
- Adrienne Kennedy, Best American New Plays: June and Jean in Concert and Sleep Deprivation Chamber (1996)
- Special Award to María Irene Fornés, Writing and Directing Letters from Cuba (2000)
- Edward Norton, performance in Burn This (2003)
- Lois Smith, performance in The Trip to Bountiful (2006)
- Sherie René Scott, performance in Landscape of the Body (2006)
- Roslyn Ruff, performance in Seven Guitars (2007)
- Lou Bellamy, performance in Two Trains Running (2007)
- Ron Cephas Jones, performance in Two Trains Running (2007)
- Kate Mulgrew, performance in Iphigenia 2.0 (2008)
- Veanne Cox, Sustained Excellence in Performance (2008)
- Jane Greenwood, Sustained Excellence in Costume Design (2008)
- Adrienne Kennedy, Lifetime Achievement Award (2008)
- Sonia Tayeh, choreography for Kung Fu (2014)
- Emmanuel Brown, fight direction for Kung Fu (2014)
- Lileana Blain-Cruz, directing for The Death of the Last Black Man in the Whole Entire World (2017)

Drama Desk Awards

- Honorary Award to Signature "For its unique concept that annually serves one playwright -- and many more audiences" (1996)
- Lifetime Achievement in Theatre Award, Arthur Miller (1997)
- Best Actress, Hallie Foote for her roles in the Horton Foote plays at Signature Theatre Company (1994–95)
- Outstanding Actress in a Play, Lois Smith, The Trip to Bountiful (2006)
- Lifetime Achievement in Theatre Award, Horton Foote (2006)

Lucille Lortel Awards

- Special Award, Horton Foote for an Individual Body of Work (1995)
- Special Award, Signature Theatre Company for an Institutional Body of Work (1995)
- Outstanding Revival, Fifth of July (2003)
- Outstanding Revival, The Trip to Bountiful (2006)
- Outstanding Director, Harris Yulin, The Trip to Bountiful (2006)
- Outstanding Lead Actress, Lois Smith, The Trip to Bountiful (2006)
- Outstanding Featured Actress, Hallie Foote, The Trip to Bountiful (2006)
- Outstanding Featured Actress, Sherie Rene Scott, Landscape of the Body (2007)
- Outstanding Featured Actor, Arthur French, Two Trains Running (2007)
- Outstanding Revival, Two Trains Running (2007)
- Outstanding Choreographer, Peter Pucci, Queens Boulevard (The Musical) (2008)

Outer Critics Circle Award

- Special Achievement Award, Horton Foote plays
- Outstanding Actress in a Play, Lois Smith, The Trip to Bountiful (2006)

AUDELCO Awards

- Best Supporting Actress, Beatrice Winde, A Lesson Before Dying (2000)
- Best Dramatic Production, Seven Guitars (2006)
- Best Direction, Ruben Santiago-Hudson, Seven Guitars (2006)
- Best Supporting Actor, Charles Weldon, Seven Guitars (2006)
- Best Sound Design, Darron L. West, Seven Guitars (2006)
- Best Set Design, David Gallo, King Hedley II (2007)
- Best Lighting Design, Thom Weaver, King Hedley II (2007)
- Best Lead Actress, Lynda Gravatt, King Hedley II (2007)
- Best Supporting Actor, Lou Myers, King Hedley II (2007)
- Best Dramatic Production Award, The First Breeze of Summer (2008)
- Best Direction Award, Ruben Santiago-Hudson, The First Breeze of Summer (2008)
- Best Playwright Award, Leslie Lee, The First Breeze of Summer (2008)
- Best Lead Actress Award, Leslie Uggams, The First Breeze of Summer (2008)
- Best Supporting Actress Award, Yaya DaCosta, The First Breeze of Summer (2008)
- Best Supporting Actor Award, John Earl Jelks, The First Breeze of Summer (2008)
- Best Lighting Design Award, Marcus Doshi, The First Breeze of Summer (2008)
- Best Set Design Award, Michael Carnahan, The First Breeze of Summer (2008)
- Best Costume Design Award, Karen Perry, The First Breeze of Summer (2008)
- Best Revival Award, Zooman and the Sign (2009)
- Best Lighting Design, Matthew Frey, Zooman and the Sign (2009)
- Outstanding Ensemble Performance Award, Kevin Carroll, Tracey Bonner and January Lavoy, Home (2009)
- Best Set Design, David Gallo, Hurt Village (2012)
- Best Supporting Actress, Marsha Stephanie Blake, Hurt Village (2012)
- Best Revival Award, The Piano Lesson (2013)
- Best Director/Dramatic Production Award, Ruben Santiago-Hudson, The Piano Lesson (2013)
- Best Lead Actress Award, Roslyn Ruff, The Piano Lesson (2013)
- Best Lead Actor Award, Brandon J. Dirden, The Piano Lesson (2013)
- Best Supporting Actor Award, Chuck Cooper, The Piano Lesson (2013)
- Best Lighting Design Award, Rui Rita, The Piano Lesson (2013)
- Best Set Design Award, Michael Carnahan, The Piano Lesson (2013)
- Best Costume Design Award, Karen Perry, The Piano Lesson (2013)
- Best Lighting Design Award, Thom Weaver, August Wilson’s How I Learned What I Learned (2014)

Special Awards & Recognition

- Time Magazine, Play of the Year: Two Rooms by Lee Blessing (1993)
- NAAP Gradiva Award for Best Play: When the World Was Green (A Chef's Fable) by Sam Shepard and Joseph Chaikin (1997)
- Margo Jones Medal: James Houghton (1998)
