= Horton Foote =

American playwright and screenwriter (1916–2009)

- Born: Albert Horton Foote Jr. March 14, 1916; Wharton, Texas, U.S.
- Died: March 4, 2009 (aged 92); Hartford, Connecticut, U.S.
- Occupations: Playwright, screenwriter
- Spouse: Lillian Vallish Foote (m. 1945; died 1992)
- Children: 4
- Writing career
- Notable works: To Kill a Mockingbird (1962); Tender Mercies (1983); Old Man (1997); The Trip to Bountiful (1985)
- Notable awards: Pulitzer Prize for Drama (1995); Academy Awards (1962, 1983); Emmy Award (1997); National Medal of Arts (2000)

Albert Horton Foote Jr. (March 14, 1916 – March 4, 2009) was an American playwright and screenwriter. He received Academy Awards for To Kill a Mockingbird (1962), which was adapted from the 1960 novel of the same name by Harper Lee, and Tender Mercies (1983). He was also known for his notable live television dramas produced during the Golden Age of Television.

Foote received the 1995 Pulitzer Prize for Drama for his play The Young Man from Atlanta. He was the inaugural recipient of the Austin Film Festival's Distinguished Screenwriter Award. In 2000, he was awarded the National Medal of Arts.

== Early life ==
Foote was born in 1916 in Wharton, Texas, the son of Harriet Gautier "Hallie" Brooks and Albert Horton Foote. His younger brothers were Thomas Brooks Foote (1921–44), who died in aerial combat over Germany during World War II, and John Speed Foote (1923–95).

== Career ==
=== Television ===
Foote moved to California, where he studied theater at the Pasadena Playhouse in 1931–32. He began his career as an actor, but was also writing plays. After getting better reviews for his plays than for his acting, during the 1940s he focused on writing. He became one of the leading writers for American television during the 1950s, beginning with an episode of The Gabby Hayes Show.

His play The Trip to Bountiful premiered March 1, 1953, on NBC with the leading cast members (Lillian Gish, Eva Marie Saint) reprising their roles on Broadway later that year. He later adapted the play into a feature film.

Throughout the 1950s, Foote wrote for The Philco Television Playhouse, The United States Steel Hour, Playhouse 90, Studio One, and Armchair Theatre, among others. He continued into the 1960s with ITV Playhouse and DuPont Show of the Month.

He twice adapted William Faulkner's "Old Man" to television, in 1958 and 1997. Each received an Emmy nomination. In 1997 Foote won Outstanding Writing of a Miniseries or Special.

=== Theatre ===
Foote's plays were produced on Broadway, Off-Broadway, Off-Off-Broadway and at regional theatres, such as the Goodman Theatre in Chicago.

He wrote the English adaptation of the original Japanese book for the 1970 musical Scarlett, a musical adaptation of Gone with the Wind.

He won the 1995 Pulitzer Prize for Drama for The Young Man from Atlanta. The Goodman Theatre production that was taken to Broadway in 1997 was nominated for the Tony Award Best Play, but did not win. The production starred Rip Torn, Shirley Knight and Biff McGuire. Knight and McGuire were also nominated for Tony Awards.

In 1996, Foote was inducted into the American Theater Hall of Fame.

In 2000, Foote was honored with the PEN/Laura Pels International Foundation for Theater Award as a Master American Dramatist.

His three-play biographical series (three full-length pieces comprising three one-act plays each), mainly about his father, The Orphans' Home Cycle, ran in repertory Off-Broadway in 2009–2010. These plays are Roots in a Parched Ground, Convicts, Lily Dale, The Widow Claire, Courtship, Valentine's Day, 1918, Cousins, and The Death of Papa. The combined productions received a Special Drama Desk Award "to the cast, creative team and producers of Horton Foote's epic The Orphans' Home Cycle". Some plays had previously been produced separately. Convicts, Lily Dale, Courtship, Valentine's Day and 1918 were filmed, and the latter three were shown on PBS in 1987 as a mini-series titled The Story of A Marriage.

In describing his three-play work, The Orphans' Home Cycle, the drama critic for the Wall Street Journal said this: "Foote, who died last March, left behind a masterpiece, one that will rank high among the signal achievements of American theater in the 20th century."

=== Films ===
Foote received an Academy Award for Writing Adapted Screenplay and the Writers Guild of America Screen Award for his adaptation of To Kill a Mockingbird in 1963. Foote did not attend the Oscars ceremony in 1963 because he did not expect to win, and so was not present to collect the award in person; it was accepted on his behalf by the film's producer, Alan J. Pakula.

Foote personally recommended actor Robert Duvall for the part of Boo Radley in To Kill a Mockingbird after meeting him during a 1957 production of The Midnight Caller at Neighborhood Playhouse in New York City. The two would work together many more times in the future. Foote had described Duvall as "our number one actor."

Foote's script for the 1983 film Tender Mercies had been rejected by many American film directors before Australian director Bruce Beresford finally accepted it; Foote later said, "this film was turned down by every American director on the face of the globe." The film received five 1984 Academy Award nominations, including Best Picture and Best Original Screenplay (which Foote won). Duvall won the Academy Award for Best Actor for his performance. Aware of his failure to attend the 1963 ceremony, Foote made sure to attend the 1984 ceremony. The film also earned Foote the Writers Guild of America Award for Best Screenplay.

Other film scripts include Baby the Rain Must Fall starring Steve McQueen and Lee Remick, which was based on his play The Travelling Lady. The film was directed by Robert Mulligan, who had worked with Foote on To Kill a Mockingbird in 1962.

Foote generally wrote screenplays that were based on his plays, such as the semi-autobiographic trilogy of 1918 (1985), On Valentine's Day (1986) and Courtship (1987). 1918 and On Valentine's Day were shot on location in Waxahachie, Texas.

His screenplay for The Trip to Bountiful (1985) won him the Independent Spirit Award for Best Screenplay as well as an Academy Award nomination, while Geraldine Page won the Academy Award for Best Actress for her role in the film.

He also adapted works by other authors, such as John Steinbeck (Of Mice and Men, directed by and starring Gary Sinise with John Malkovich).

In addition to Faulkner's Old Man, Foote adapted Faulkner's short story Tomorrow as a 1972 film of the same name starring Robert Duvall. Foote had previously adapted the story as a play for television's Playhouse 90 in 1960. Leonard Maltin, in his movie guide book, calls the movie the best film adaptation of any of Faulkner's work. On the subject of Faulkner, Foote said, "Faulkner I never met but evidently he liked [my adaptations] because he's allowed me to share the dramatic copyrights to both Old Man and Tomorrow ... So in other words, you have to get both our permissions to do it."

Playwright Lillian Hellman adapted his 1952 play and 1956 novel for the 1966 film The Chase, with Marlon Brando, Jane Fonda and Robert Redford.

Foote provided the voice of Jefferson Davis for Ken Burns's critically acclaimed documentary, The Civil War (PBS, 1990). Adaptations of his plays The Habitation of Dragons (TNT, 1992) and Lily Dale (Showtime, 1996) preceded the Showtime production of Horton Foote's Alone (1997). His final work was the screenplay for Main Street, a 2010 dramatic film.

== Personal life ==
Foote was married to Lillian Vallish Foote (1923–1992) from June 4, 1945, until her death in 1992. Their four children are actors Albert Horton Foote III and Hallie Foote; playwright Daisy Brooks Foote; and director, writer and lawyer Walter Vallish Foote.

They have worked on projects with their father. Hallie and Albert Horton Foote III (also known as Horton Jr.) appeared in their father's film 1918 (1985). Hallie has appeared on stage in her father's works, including, for example, Dividing the Estate in 2008, The Orphans' Home Cycle Part III: The Story of a Family in 2010 and Harrison, TX: Three Plays by Horton Foote Off-Broadway in 2012. Daisy wrote the play When They Speak of Rita (2000) in which Hallie appeared and was directed by their father.

Foote was introduced to Christian Science while in California and went on to become a dedicated member of the church. He served as a First Reader in a branch church in Nyack, New York, and also taught Sunday School for many years while living in New Boston, New Hampshire.

Foote was the voice of Jefferson Davis in the 11-hour PBS series The Civil War (1990). Shelby Foote wrote the comprehensive three volume, 3000-page history, together titled The Civil War: A Narrative, upon which the series was partially based and who appeared in almost ninety segments. The two Footes were cousins.

Foote was the cousin of actor/director Peter Masterson who directed three of his screenplays, including The Trip to Bountiful, Convicts and the Hallmark Hall of Fame television production of Lily Dale, starring Mary Stuart Masterson, Peter's daughter.

Foote died in Hartford, Connecticut, on March 4, 2009, at the age of 92, while he was working on a production of The Orphans' Home Cycle to premiere in the city. At the time of his death, he lived in his hometown of Wharton, Texas, and the Pacific Palisades section of Los Angeles.

== Honors and style ==
Foote was awarded an honorary doctorate in 2006 from Carson-Newman University.

He received an honorary doctorate of humane letters in 1987 from Spalding University (Louisville, Kentucky).

One of Foote's primary biographers is Dr. Gerald Wood, former chairman of the English Department at Carson-Newman. Books by Wood about Foote include Horton Foote and the Theater of Intimacy and Horton Foote: A Casebook (Taylor & Francis, 1998, ISBN 08-15-325444; rev. Routledge, 2014, ISBN 11-35-636028). Wood and Marion Castleberry co-edited The Voice of an American Playwright: Interviews with Horton Foote (Mercer University Press, 2012, ISBN 978-0881463972).

Baylor University also holds close ties with Foote. In 2002, Foote accepted the title as "Visiting Distinguished Dramatist" with the Baylor Department of Theatre Arts.

Tess Harper, an actress who worked with Foote on Tender Mercies, described him as "America's Chekhov. If he didn't study the Russians, he's a reincarnation of the Russians. He's a quiet man who writes quiet people." Regarding his own writing, Foote said, "I know that people think I have a certain style, but I think style is like the color of the eyes. I don't know that you choose that."

Foote made an effort to employ lifelike language in his writing, citing W. B. Yeats's work as an example of this realistic approach. In an interview with playwright Stuart Spencer, Foote discusses his writing and material: "I think there's certain things you don't choose. I don't think that you can choose a style; I think a style chooses you. I think that's almost an unconscious choice. And I don't know that you can choose subject matter, really. I think that's almost an unconscious choice. I have a theory that from the time you're 12 years old all your themes are kind of locked in."

The Fine Arts Building at the college located in Wharton, Texas, Wharton County Junior College, is named the Horton Foote Theatre. He was known to be a large supporter of the arts in his hometown of Wharton, Texas. A Horton Foote Scholarship is awarded at the school to one student per year who excels in theatre.

In December 2000, President Bill Clinton presented Foote with the National Medal of Arts, saying that he was "the nation's most prolific writer for stage, film, and television."

Academy Awards

- To Kill a Mockingbird (winner) – Screenplay Adapted from Another Medium (1962)
- Tender Mercies (winner) – Screenplay Written Directly for the Screen (1983)
- The Trip to Bountiful (nominee) – Screenplay Adapted from Another Medium (1985)

== Stage plays ==
The Orphans' Home Cycle is a series of nine plays concerning Horace Robedaux (an alias for Horton Foote's father, Albert Horton Foote Sr.), Elizabeth Vaughn (his mother Harriet Gauthier "Hallie" Brooks), and their extended families.

- Wharton Dance (1940)
- Texas Town (1941)
- Only the Heart (1942)
- Out of My House (1942)
- Two Southern Idylls: Miss Lou / The Girls (1943)
- The Lonely (1944)
- Goodbye to Richmond (1944)
- Daisy Lee (one-act) (1944)
- Homecoming (1944)
- In My Beginning (1944)
- People in the Show (1944)
- Return (1944)
- Celebration (1950)
- The Chase (1952)
- The Trip to Bountiful (1953)
- The Traveling Lady (1954)
- The Dancers (1954)
- John Turner Davis (1956)
- The Midnight Caller (1956)
- Roots in a Parched Ground (Orphans' Home cycle) (1962)
- Tomorrow (1968)
- Gone with the Wind (author of book) (1972)
- A Young Lady of Property (1976)
- Night Seasons (1977)
- Courtship (Orphans' Home cycle) (1978)
- 1918 (Orphans' Home cycle) (1979)
- In a Coffin in Egypt (1980)
- Valentine's Day (Orphans' Home cycle) (1980)
- The Man Who Climbed the Pecan Trees (1981)
- The Old Friends (1982)
- The Roads to Home: Nightingale / The Dearest of Friends / Spring Dance (1982)
- The Land of the Astronauts (1983)
- Cousins (Orphans' Home cycle) (1983)
- The Road to the Graveyard (one-act) (1985)
- Courtship/Valentine's Day (Orphans' Home cycle) (1985)
- The One-Armed Man (1985)
- The Prisoner's Song (1985)
- Blind Date (one-act) (1985)
- Convicts (Orphans' Home cycle) (1986)
- The Widow Claire (Orphans' Home cycle) (1986)
- Lily Dale (Orphans' Home cycle) (1986)
- The Habitation of Dragons (1988)
- The Death of Papa (Orphans' Home cycle) (1999)
- Dividing the Estate (1989)
- Talking Pictures (1990)
- Laura Dennis (1995)
- The Young Man from Atlanta (1995)
- The Day Emily Married (1996)
- Vernon Early (1998)
- The Last of the Thorntons (2000)
- The Carpetbagger's Children (2001)
- The Actor (2002)
- Getting Frankie Married — and Afterwards (2002)
- Dividing the Estate (2008)
- Harrison, TX: Three Plays by Horton Foote (2012)

== Screenplays ==
- Storm Fear (1955)
- To Kill a Mockingbird (1962)
- Baby the Rain Must Fall (1965)
- Hurry Sundown (1967)
- Tomorrow (1972)
- Barn Burning (1980)
- Tender Mercies (1983)
- 1918 (1985)
- The Trip to Bountiful (1985)
- On Valentine's Day (1986)
- Of Mice and Men (1992)
- Convicts (1991)
- Lily Dale (1996)
- Alone (1997)
- Main Street (2010)
- Bessie (2015) (story by)

== Memoirs ==
- Farewell: A Memoir of a Texas Childhood (Scribner, 1999)
- Beginnings (2001), Simon and Schuster, 2002, ISBN 0-74-3217616

== Sources ==
- McGilligan, Patrick. Backstory 3: Interviews with Screenwriters of the 60s. Berkeley: University of California Press, 1997.
- Hampton, Wilborn (2009). Horton Foote: America's Storyteller. New York: Free Press. ISBN 9781416566403.
- Haynes, Robert W. (2010). The Major Plays of Horton Foote: The Trip to Bountiful, The Young Man from Atlanta, and The Orphans' Home Cycle. Lewiston, New York: The Edwin Mellen Press.
- Castleberry, Marion. 2014. Blessed Assurance: The Life and Art of Horton Foote. Macon, GA: Mercer University Press.
