= Jill Savitt =

American film editor

- Occupation: Film editor

Jill Savitt is an American film and TV editor known for her work on Buffy the Vampire Slayer, Secret Window, and The Lookout. She also edited episodes of Gilmore Girls, Bunheads, and Roswell.

== Selected filmography ==
Editor
Year	Film	Director	Notes	Ref.
1985	Key Exchange	Barnet Kellman		
1987	Light of Day	Paul Schrader		
1988	Full Moon in Blue Water	Peter Masterson	First collaboration with Peter Masterson	
1991	Convicts	Peter Masterson	Second collaboration with Peter Masterson	
1992	Buffy the Vampire Slayer	Fran Rubel Kuzui		
1993	Frauds	Stephan Elliott	Uncredited	
1993	Dream Lover	Nicholas Kazan		
1994	China Moon	John Bailey		
1994	Blank Check	Rupert Wainwright		
1996	The Trigger Effect	David Koepp	First collaboration with David Koepp	
1997	Telling Lies in America	Guy Ferland	First collaboration with Guy Ferland	
1999	Stir of Echoes	David Koepp	Second collaboration with David Koepp	
2002	Bang Bang You're Dead	Guy Ferland	Second collaboration with Guy Ferland	
2004	Secret Window	David Koepp	Third collaboration with David Koepp	
2007	The Lookout	Scott Frank	First collaboration with Scott Frank	
2008	Flash of Genius	Marc Abraham		
2012	Premium Rush	David Koepp	Fourth collaboration with David Koepp	
2014	A Walk Among the Tombstones	Scott Frank	Second collaboration with Scott Frank	
2015	Mortdecai	David Koepp	Fifth collaboration with David Koepp	

Editorial department
Year	Film	Director	Role
1981	Reds	Warren Beatty	Assistant film editor
1982	Tootsie	Sydney Pollack	Assistant editor
1982	Sophie's Choice	Alan J. Pakula	First assistant editor
1984	Kidco	Ronald F. Maxwell	Assistant editor
1984	Places in the Heart	Robert Benton	First assistant editor
1984	The Flamingo Kid	Garry Marshall	Assistant editor
1986	The Money Pit	Richard Benjamin	Assistant film editor
1986	Brighton Beach Memoirs	Gene Saks	First assistant editor
1987	Light of Day	Paul Schrader	Additional editor
2016	Ben-Hur	Timur Bekmambetov	Additional editor

Thanks
Year	Film	Director	Role
2017	November Criminals	Sacha Gervasi	Special thanks

TV documentaries

Editorial department
Year	Film	Director	Role
1981	Kiss Me, Petruchio	Christopher Dixon	Assistant editor

TV movies

Editor
Year	Film	Director
2001	More, Patience	Jon Turteltaub
2002	Bang Bang You're Dead	Guy Ferland
2007	The Thick of It	Christopher Guest

TV series

Editor
Year	Title	Notes
1999	Roswell	3 episodes
2005	Revelations	1 episode
2000−06	Gilmore Girls	68 episodes
2010	Life Unexpected	2 episodes
2012−13	Bunheads	9 episodes

Editorial department
Year	Title	Role	Notes
2010	Life Unexpected	Additional editor	1 episode
