= Night Game (film) =

1989 film by Peter Masterson

- Directed by: Peter Masterson
- Written by: Anthony Palmer
- Produced by: George Litto
- Starring: Roy Scheider; Lane Smith; Karen Young; Richard Bradford
- Cinematography: Fred Murphy
- Edited by: Robert Barrere; King Wilder
- Music by: Pino Donaggio
- Production company: Baseball Productions
- Distributed by: Trans World Entertainment
- Release date: September 15, 1989
- Running time: 95 minutes
- Country: United States
- Language: English
- Box office: $337,812

Night Game is a 1989 American slasher film directed by Peter Masterson and starring Roy Scheider, Lane Smith, Karen Young, and Richard Bradford. It follows a police detective attempting to stop a hook-handed serial killer whose murders coincide with nighttime baseball games at the Houston Astrodome.

== Plot ==
Along a beachfront boardwalk in Galveston, Texas, a prostitute named Loretta Akers is attacked by an unseen assailant and has her throat slit, making her the latest victim in a string of serial killings. Mike Seaver, a former Minor League Baseball player-turned-police officer, goes to investigate the crime scene, where he finds a shred of a paper reading "best of luck" in Loretta's garter belt. Mike argues with county police officer Kyle Broussard, who is protective over the case, and whom Mike believes is secretly a pimp.

Mike and fellow detective Oscar Mendoza determine that each of the murders have corresponded with a victory of the Houston Astros pitcher Sil Baretto, an amalgamation of pitchers Bob Knepper and Juan Agosto. Mike and Oscar interview Donnie, the boyfriend of one of the victims. Shortly after, Mike receives a radio dispatch alerting him that two young women have been murdered in a funhouse at the seaside carnival where Mike's fiancee, Roxy, works. In the funhouse, the message "best of luck" is scrawled in blood on a mirror. The women's autopsies determine they were slashed to death by a left-handed killer, which is at odds with the notes left behind, which appear to have been written by a right-handed person.

Sportswriter Bill Essicks visits the police station to report he received a phone call from a sobbing man who claimed to have killed the girls. Later, Mike finds someone has broken into his home, presumably searching for Loretta's diary. Later, Mike learns that the first victim was found behind a church on the Fourth of July during Sil's wedding ceremony. Mike and Bill determine that every murder aside from the victims in the funhouse took place after an Astros home game that Baretto won; during the funhouse killings, a television broadcaster incorrectly reported that Baretto was pitching that night.

After another woman is killed on the beach, Kyle accuses Mike of withholding evidence, and a brawl breaks out between them. Broussard is subsequently put in charge of the case. That night, police captain Nelson is visited by Mike, who presents him with Loretta's appointment book. Nelson phones a number that appears throughout the book, and the call is received by Kyle. Mike insists this is proof that Kyle is a pimp.

Mike travels from Galveston to Houston to attend a game at the Astrodome with Bill. Mike learns that the day Barreto was promoted from the minor leagues to the Astros, Floyd Epps, the pitcher he replaced, was involved in a road accident resulting in his left hand being amputated and replaced with a hook. Fearing Floyd is the killer and may strike again, Mike flees the baseball game and drives back to Galveston. Meanwhile, Roxy has a drink at the Balinese Room, inadvertently sitting next to Floyd. Baretto wins the game, and a leering Floyd frightens Roxy, who exits the bar onto an empty outdoor patio. Floyd follows and corners Roxy, but the swings of his hook are as wild as his mental state and he misses. Mike arrives in time to shoot Floyd dead.

Several weeks later, Mike and Roxy are married. Dressed in their formal wedding attire, the two attend a game at the Astrodome, where Baretto leaves the mound to shake Mike's hand, as the crowd gives them a standing ovation.

== Cast ==
- Roy Scheider as Detective Mike Seaver
- Karen Young as Roxy
- Richard Bradford as Nelson
- Matt Carlson as Diddee
- Michelle Cochran as Cindy Baretto
- Alex Garcia as Sil Baretto
- Paul Gleason as Kyle Broussard
- Carlin Glynn as Alma
- Rex Linn as Floyd Epps
- Alex Morris as Gries
- Anthony Palmer as Mendoza
- Lane Smith as Witty
- Lisa Hart Carroll as Loretta Akers
- Sue Dahlman as Eva Lyons
- Renee O'Connor as Lorraine Beasley
- Kevin Cooney as Bill Essicks
- James Black as Dale

== Production ==
Night Game was George Litto's second film in a five-film, two-year, deal with Trans World Entertainment, following Kansas (1988).

=== Filming ===
Night Game was filmed entirely in Galveston and Houston and features such landmarks as the Galveston Seawall, Galveston Cotton Exchange (which is seen as the fictional Galveston Police headquarters), the San Luis Hotel, the Balinese Room (where Epps is killed), Galveston County Daily News compound (including some of the police station scenes depicting the detective office space), the former Broadway Theater, and the Gulf Freeway. Filming was temporarily interrupted by the arrival of Hurricane Gilbert, which forced the cast and crew to evacuate Galveston.

The movie was covered in the July 1989 Houston Astros program on pages 58 and 59. An author is not listed:

Glenn Davis has proven repeatedly that he has a flair for the dramatic. With his consistent game-winning RBIs, one might say he almost performs on cue. And in August, he will prove it again, not only to Astros fans, but across America, when he belts a homer in the upcoming movie, Night Game. Parts of the movie were filmed in the Astrodome last year and director Peter Masterson says Davis proved to be the man he needed for a tricky plot twist. 'We needed an Astro to hit a home run and Davis was the one that hit it, so he got in the movie,' laughed Masterson in a call from his New York home."

Night Game was the first movie in years to be filmed in the Astrodome, joining Brewster McCloud, a peculiar 1971 Robert Altman film largely shot in the stadium, The Bad News Bears in Breaking Training, and Murder at the World Series, an ABC-TV movie of the week that featured the Astros in a World Series before they had even won a division championship. This newest movie is also a murder mystery. Roy Scheider plays a Galveston detective who is cheering for the Astros in the midst of a tight pennant race. But one problem, he is assigned to track down a serial killer. And Scheider is discovering that the murders take place on the same night that Houston wins games.

Night Game was originally scripted to be set in San Francisco, but Masterson, a Houston native, who has also made The Trip to Bountiful and wrote The Best Little Whorehouse in Texas, decided to bring the movie to Texas. 'It seemed more interesting to bring it to Houston. A lot of movies are made in San Francisco and not as many in Houston or Galveston,' the director said. 'I think it worked out better; it's a different kind of locale.' Critical to the movie was the availability of the Dome, he said. Filming during the games was limited to capturing crowd reaction, wide-angle shots of the teams and the occasional player at bat. Dodgers outfielder Mike Marshall was, like Davis, expected to hit a homer, Masterson said. But the director found that dingers in the Dome aren't all that common. 'We tried our best, but he didn't cooperate,' Masterson smiled, admitting that he had to resort to footage of a Marshall single and 'we cut real quick after the crack of the bat to crowd shots.'

Much more Dome footage will involve players no one is familiar with though. Masterson said former Astro Norm Miller, now a team executive, arranged for squads of amateur players to imitate the pros. 'After games ended, we got the field. We simulated some on-the-field stuff and got the close ups we needed,' Masterson recalled. 'We worked until dawn every night. As soon as it got too light, we'd have to quit.' In addition to present and past Astro stars, Houstonians will also recognize one more local figure in the movie. Bob Allen, the sports director at KTRK-TV Channel 13 plays the Astros' play-by-play broadcaster. Masterson said the anchorman 'did a really good job.'

== Release ==
=== Box office ===
Night Games opened theatrically in the United States on September 15, 1989, grossing a total of $337,812 during its fifteen-week theatrical run.

=== Critical response ===
Caryn James of The New York Times wrote of the film: "Maybe Roy Scheider should go back to chasing sharks. His career has taken a long, slow dive from his days as the harassed police chief in Jaws and the tortured Broadway director in All That Jazz. In fact, it seems to have hit bottom in Night Game." The review further stated, "It's hard to see what could have been done to liven up Night Game, short of having someone run into the Galveston Police Department yelling 'Shark!' Too bad no one does."

Michael Wilmington of the Los Angeles Times also criticized the film, noting: "Night Game answers the burning question: Would bad, improbably plotted slasher movies be any better if they had humor, strong characters and pungent dialogue instead of incessant car-crashes and blood-letting? The answer, surprisingly, is no."

== See also ==
- List of baseball films
