= Teri Garr filmography =

Films that feature the actress Teri Garr

Teri Garr (1944–2024) was an American actress who appeared in over 70 films. She began her film career in the early 1960s as a dancer in various musicals before having small speaking roles in Head (1968) and Changes (1969). In 1974, she was cast as Inga in Mel Brooks's comedy horror film Young Frankenstein (1974), and also had a supporting role in Francis Ford Coppola's thriller The Conversation (1974).

In 1977, Garr starred in Steven Spielberg's science fiction film Close Encounters of the Third Kind, and she gained critical acclaim for her performance in the Sydney Pollack-directed comedy Tootsie (1982), for which she was nominated for an Academy Award for Best Supporting Actress. She subsequently had supporting roles in the comedy Mr. Mom (1983). She also starred in Full Moon in Blue Water with Gene Hackman and Meredith Burger (1988) and two Robert Altman films: The Player (1992), and Prêt-à-Porter (1994). Garr subsequently had small roles in the comedies Dumb and Dumber (1994), Dick (1999) and Ghost World (2001) before going into retirement in 2011 due to her diagnosis with multiple sclerosis.

== Film ==
Year	Film	Role	Notes	Ref.
1963	Fun in Acapulco	Hotel Guest	Uncredited	
1964	Kissin' Cousins	Hillbilly Dancer	Uncredited	
1964	Viva Las Vegas	Dancer	Uncredited	
1964	What a Way to Go!	Dancer In Shipboard Number	Uncredited	
1964	Roustabout	College Student	Uncredited	
1964	Pajama Party	Pajama Girl	as Teri Hope	
1964	T.A.M.I. Show	Background dancer		
1965	John Goldfarb, Please Come Home	Harem Girl	Uncredited	
1965	Red Line 7000	Nightclub Dancer	Uncredited	
1965	Girl Happy			
1966	Where Is the Bus?	Girl	Short film	
1966	For Pete's Sake	Girl	as Terry Garr	
1967	The Cool Ones	Whiz-Bam Girl	Uncredited	
1967	Clambake	Dancer	Uncredited	
1967	The Hardy Boys: The Mystery of the Chinese Junk	Susie	as Terry Garr	
1968	Head	Testy True	as Terry Garr	
1969	Changes	The Waitress		
1970	The Moonshine War	Young Wife	as Terry Garr	
1974	The Conversation	Amy Fredericks		
1974	Young Frankenstein	Inga		
1976	Won Ton Ton, the Dog Who Saved Hollywood	Fluffy Peters		
1977	Oh, God!	Bobbie Landers		
1977	Close Encounters of the Third Kind	Ronnie Neary		
1977	The Absent-Minded Waiter	Susan Cates	Short film	
1979	Mr. Mike's Mondo Video	Herself		
1979	The Black Stallion	Mrs. Ramsey, Alec's Mother		
1980	Witches' Brew	Margaret Lightman		
1981	Honky Tonk Freeway	Ericka		
1982	One from the Heart	Frannie		
1982	The Escape Artist	Arlene		
1982	Tootsie	Sandy Lester		
1983	The Sting II	Veronica		
1983	The Black Stallion Returns	Mrs. Ramsey, Alec's Mother		
1983	Mr. Mom	Caroline Butler		
1984	Firstborn	Wendy Livingston		
1985	After Hours	Julie		
1986	Miracles	Jean		
1988	Full Moon in Blue Water	Louise Taylor		
1989	Out Cold	Sunny		
1989	Let It Ride	Pam Trotter		
1990	Short Time	Carolyn Simpson		
1990	Waiting for the Light	Kay Harris		
1990	A Quiet Little Neighborhood, a Perfect Little Murder	Marsha Pegler		
1992	The Player	Herself		
1992	Mom and Dad Save the World	Marge Nelson		
1994	Dumb and Dumber	Helen Swanson		
1994	Prêt-à-Porter	Louise Hamilton		
1994	Save the Rabbits	Lisa	Short film	
1995	Perfect Alibi	Laney Tolbert		
1996	Michael	Judge Esther Newberg		
1997	Changing Habits	Connie		
1997	A Simple Wish	Rena		
1997	The Definite Maybe	Dionne Waters		
1998	Casper Meets Wendy	Fanny		
1999	Kill the Man	Mrs. Livingston		
1999	Dick	Helen Lorenzo		
2000	The Sky Is Falling	Mona Hall		
2000	Batman Beyond: Return of the Joker	Mary McGinnis	Voice	
2001	Ghost World	Maxine	Uncredited	
2002	Life Without Dick	Madame Hugonaut	Direct-to-video	
2005	Aloha, Scooby-Doo!	Molly Quinn	Voice, direct-to-video	
2005	A Taste of Jupiter	Ginnie		
2006	Unaccompanied Minors	Valerie's Sister	Uncredited	
2007	Expired	Mother Barney / Aunt Tilde		
2007	Kabluey	Suze		
2007	God Out the Window	Channing	Short film	

== Television ==
Year	Title	Role	Notes	Ref
1964	Mr. Novak	Lisa	Episode: "How Does Your Garden Grow?"	
1964–1965	Shindig!	Herself (Dancer)	Recurring role (5 episodes)	
1965	Dr. Kildare	Naomi	Episode: "With Hellfire and Thunder"; uncredited	
1965	Hullabaloo	Herself – (Go-Go Dancer)	Episode: "#1.18"; uncredited	
1965	Where the Action Is	Telegram Lady	Episode: "Pilot"	
1966	Batman	Girl Outside Rink	Episode: "Instant Freeze"; uncredited	
1967–1968	That Girl	Estelle / Actress #1 At Audition	2 episodes; uncredited	
1968	The Andy Griffith Show	Girl in Red Convertible	Episode: "The Wedding"; credited as Terri Garr	
1968	Star Trek	Roberta Lincoln	Episode: "Assignment: Earth"; credited as Terri Garr	
1968	Mayberry R.F.D.	The Cashier	Episode: "Miss Farmerette"; credited as Terri Garr	
1969	The Mothers-In-Law	The Usherette	Episode: "Two on the Aisle"; credited as Terri Garr	
1969	Room 222	Marianne	Episode: "Naked Came We Into the World"; credited as Terry Garr	
1969	It Takes a Thief	Maggie Philbin	2 episodes; credited as Terry Garr	
1970–1975	McCloud	Sergeant Phyllis Norton / Nora Mullins / Bit Role	6 episodes; credited as Terry Garr	
1971–1974	The Sonny and Cher Comedy Hour	Various Characters/ Countess Legustav	Recurring role (46 episodes)	
1972	The Ken Berry 'Wow' Show	Performer	Regular (1972)	
1972	Banyon	Mabel	Episode: "A Date with Death"	
1973	The Burns and Schreiber Comedy Hour	Performer	Regular	
1973	The New Dick Van Dyke Show	Waitress	Episode: "Turning Pro"	
1973–1974	The Bob Newhart Show	Miss Brennan	2 episodes	
1973–1974	The Girl with Something Extra	Amber	Recurring role (4 episodes)	
1973–1978	M*A*S*H	Lieutenant Suzanne Marquette	2 episodes	
1974	The Odd Couple	Insurance Agent	Episode: "The Flying Felix"	
1974	Barnaby Jones	Maria Thompson	Episode: "Image in a Cracked Mirror"	
1974	Paul Sand in Friends and Lovers	Sharon	Episode: "Fiddler in the House"	
1975	Cher	Olivia / Mrs. Oscar Smedley	3 episodes	
1975	Maude	Mrs. Carlson	Episode: "Viv's Dog"	
1975	Hollywood Squares	Herself (Panelist)	2 episodes	
1976	The Sonny and Cher Show	Olivia	Regular (1976–1977)	
1976	Law & Order	Rita Wasinski		
1977	Once Upon a Brothers Grimm	Princess	Television film; segment: "The Frog Prince"	
1977	Hunter	Peg Foley	Episode: "The Backup"	
1979–1985	Saturday Night Live!	Herself (Host), Diner Waitress	5 episodes	
1980	Doctor Franken	Kelli Fisher	Television film	
1982	Prime Suspect	Amy McCleary	Television film	
1982	Faerie Tale Theatre	Princess	Episode: "The Tale of the Frog Prince"	
1983	The Winter of Our Discontent	Mary Hawley	Television film	
1984	The New Show	Various Characters	Episode: "#1.5"	
1984	To Catch a King	Hannah Winter	Television film	
1985	The Booth	Unknown	Television film; segment: "Death at Dinner"	
1986	Intimate Strangers	Sally Bierston	Television film	
1986	Fresno	Talon Kensington	5 episodes; miniseries	
1986	Pack of Lies	Helen Schaefer	Television film	
1987	Trying Times	Robin Stone	Episode: "Drive, She Said"	
1987	Sesame Street	Amelia	Episode: "#19.24"	
1988	Teri Garr in Flapjack Floozie	Helen Eagles	Television film	
1990	Mother Goose Rock 'n' Rhyme	Jill	Television film	
1990	A Quiet Little Neighborhood, a Perfect Little Murder	Marsha Pegler	Television film	
1991	Tales from the Crypt	Irene Paloma	Episode: "The Trap"	
1991	Stranger in the Family	Randi Thompson	Television film	
1991	Good & Evil	Denise Sandler	6 episodes	
1991	Futures	Herself	Episode: "Math, Who Needs It?"	
1992	Deliver Them from Evil: The Taking of Alta View	Susan Woodley	Television film	
1992	Dream On	Sandra McCadden	Episode: "And Bimbo Was His Name-O"	
1993	Murphy Brown	Herself	Episode: "Bump in the Night"	
1993	The Legend of Prince Valiant	Selena	Voice, 2 episodes	
1993	The Larry Sanders Show	Herself	Episode: "The Breakdown"	
1993	Fugitive Nights: Danger in the Desert	Brita Burrows	Television film	
1993	Adventures in Wonderland	Duchess	Recurring role (6 episodes)	
1993–1998	Jeopardy!	Herself (Celebrity Contestant)	2 episodes	
1994	Duckman	Vanessa Le Pert	Voice, episode: "It's the Thing of the Principal"	
1994	Good Advice	Paige Turner	Recurring role (13 episodes)	
1994	Aliens for Breakfast	Mrs. Bickerstaff	Television film	
1995	Women of the House	Sissy Emerson	Recurring role (12 episodes)	
1995	Frasier	Nancy	Voice, episode: "She's the Boss"	
1996	Men Behaving Badly	Carol	Episode: "Christmas"	
1997	Murder Live!	JoAnn McGrath	Television film	
1997	NightScream	Julie Ordell	Television film	
1997	Sabrina, the Teenage Witch	Witch Yenta	Episode: "Dante's Inferno"	
1997–1998	Friends	Phoebe Abbott	3 episodes	
1998	Sin City Spectacular	Unknown	Episode: "#1.15"	
1998	Barney's First Adventure	Herself	Television film	
1998–2002	Biography	Herself (Interviewee)	2 episodes; documentary	
1999	Half a Dozen Babies	Lee Dilley	Television film	
1999	ER	Celinda Randlett	Episode: "Getting to Know You"	
1999	Dr. Katz, Professional Therapist	Teri	Voice, episode: "Pullman Square"	
1999–2000	Batman Beyond	Mary McGinnis	Voice, recurring role (10 episodes)	
2000	King of the Hill	Laney	Voice, episode: "Bill of Sales"	
2000	I've Got a Secret	Herself (Panelist)		
2001	A Colder Kind of Death	Tess Malone	Television film	
2001	Felicity	Dr. Zwick	Episode: "It's Raining Men"	
2001	Strong Medicine	Mimi Stark	Episode: "Control Group"	
2001–2002	Hollywood Squares	Herself (Panelist)	25 episodes	
2002	Mad TV	Herself	Episode: "#7.25"	
2003	What's New, Scooby-Doo?	Sandy Gordon	Voice, episode: "Toy Scary Boo"	
2003	Life with Bonnie	Mrs. Abigail Portinbody	Episode: "Buy This Book"	
2003	Greetings from Tucson	Helen	Episode: "Coffee"	
2005	Law & Order: Special Victims Unit	Minerva Grahame-Bishop	Episode: "Starved"	
2006	Crumbs	Lorraine Bergman	Episode: "He Ain't Hetero, He's My Brother"	
2011	How to Marry a Billionaire	Lindsey's Mom	Television film	

== Video games ==
Year	Title	Role	Notes	Ref
1998	Black Dahlia	Madame Cassandra	Live-action	
