= Fred Murphy (cinematographer) =

American cinematographer

Fred Murphy A.S.C. (born December 16, 1942) is an American cinematographer.

== Filmography ==
=== Film ===
Year	Title	Director	Notes
1969	Submission	Allen Savage	
1975	Rime of the Ancient Mariner	Raúl daSilva	Animation cinematographer
1977	Local Color	Mark Rappaport	
1978	The Scenic Route	Mark Rappaport	
1978	Girlfriends	Claudia Weill	
1979	Heartland	Richard Pearce	
1979	Imposters	Mark Rappaport	
1980	Tell Me a Riddle	Lee Grant	
1982	The Ghost Dance	Peter F. Buffa	
1982	The State of Things	Wim Wenders	With Henri Alekan and Martin Schäfer
1982	Q	Larry Cohen	
1983	Touched	John Flynn	
1983	Eddie and the Cruisers	Martin Davidson	
1985	Key Exchange	Barnet Kellman	
1985	The Trip to Bountiful	Peter Masterson	
1985	Death of an Angel	Petru Popescu	
1986	Hoosiers	David Anspaugh	
1987	Winners Take All	Fritz Kiersch	
1987	Five Corners	Tony Bill	
1987	The Dead	John Huston	
1987	Best Seller	John Flynn	
1988	Full Moon in Blue Water	Peter Masterson	
1988	Fresh Horses	David Anspaugh	
1989	Night Game	Peter Masterson	
1989	Enemies, A Love Story	Paul Mazursky	
1990	Funny About Love	Leonard Nimoy	
1991	Scenes from a Mall	Paul Mazursky	
1993	Jack the Bear	Marshall Herskovitz	
1993	The Pickle	Paul Mazursky	
1995	Murder in the First	Marc Rocco	
1996	A Family Thing	Richard Pearce	
1996	Faithful	Paul Mazursky	
1997	Metro	Thomas Carter	
1998	Dance with Me	Randa Haines	
1999	October Sky	Joe Johnston	
1999	Stir of Echoes	David Koepp	
2000	The Fantasticks	Michael Ritchie	
2001	Soul Survivors	Stephen Carpenter	
2002	The Mothman Prophecies	Mark Pellington	
2002	Auto Focus	Paul Schrader	With Jeffrey Greeley
2002	Cheats	Andrew Gurland	
2003	Freddy vs. Jason	Ronny Yu	
2004	Secret Window	David Koepp	
2005	Dreamer	John Gatins	
2006	RV	Barry Sonnenfeld	
2007	Anamorph	Henry Miller	
2008	Drillbit Taylor	Steven Brill	
2008	Ghost Town	David Koepp	

Documentary film

Year	Title	Director	Notes
1976	Not a Pretty Picture	Martha Coolidge	With Don Lenzer
1980	Memoirs of a Movie Palace: The Kings of Flatbush	Christian Blackwood	
1980	Martha Clarke Light & Dark: a dancer's journal	Joyce Chopra	With Don Lenzer
1985	What Sex Am I?	Lee Grant	
2007	Trumbo	Peter Askin	With Jonathan Furmanski, Chris Norr and Frank Prinzi
2012	Shut Up and Look	Maryte Kavaliauskas	

=== Television ===
TV movies

Year	Title	Director
1979	The Other Side of Victory	Bill Jersey
1983	Sessions	Richard Pearce
1983	Trackdown: Finding the Goodbar Killer	Bill Persky
1984	A Matter of Sex	Lee Grant
1985	Mirrors	Harry Winer
1987	Laguna Heat	Simon Langton
1989	The Final Days	Richard Pearce
1991	Stranger at My Door	Vincent McEveety
1999	Witness Protection	Richard Pearce
2001	Murder, She Wrote: The Last Free Man	Anthony Pullen Shaw
2003	Partners and Crime	Thomas Carter
2003	Murder, She Wrote: The Celtic Riddle	Anthony Pullen Shaw
2003	Suspense	David Koepp
