= Gary Swanson =

American actor (born 1948)

- Born: September 1, 1948 (age 77); Queens, New York City, New York, U.S.
- Occupation: Actor / Film Producer
- Years active: 1974-present
- Website: https://garyswanson.org/

Gary Swanson (born September 1, 1948) is an American film and television actor.

== Early life ==
Born in Queens, New York, Swanson graduated from Long Island University (then C.W. Post College), in Long Island, New York, with a bachelor's degree in English Literature. He soon then began studying under renowned acting coaches Elia Kazan and Lee Strasberg at The Actors Studio in New York City, where he is presently a lifetime member.

== Career ==
Swanson kickstarted his acting career in the films Vice Squad (1982) with Season Hubley and Making Love (1982) with Kate Jackson, Harry Hamlin and Michael Ontkean. He also was featured in the television miniseries Loose Change (1977–78). He also appeared in the NBC-TV movie A Family Upside Down (1977–78).

After briefly working as a high diver for the Atlantic City Steel Pier, Swanson began in television around the start of his acting career with a role on the NBC-TV soap opera series Somerset in 1974, where he appeared as Dr. Greg Mercer for three seasons. He continued to work steadily in film throughout the 1980s and the 1990s, appearing in Stranded (1987) with Ione Skye, and the Eric Roberts dramatic adventure film Blood Red (1989). He also appeared in the Phillip Schopper comedy In the Spirit (1990).

He has also played roles in the horror film The Guardian (1990), the film Convicts with Robert Duvall (1991) and Double Threat (1992) with Sally Kirkland. He also appeared in The Bone Collector (1999) with film star Denzel Washington. Most recently, Swanson acted in Whiskey School (2007).
