= The Best Little Whorehouse in Texas (film) =

1982 film by Colin Higgins

- Theatrical release poster
- Directed by: Colin Higgins
- Screenplay by: Larry L. King; Peter Masterson; Colin Higgins
- Based on: The Best Little Whorehouse in Texas by: Larry L. King; Peter Masterson
- Produced by: Thomas L. Miller; Edward K. Milkis; Robert L. Boyett
- Starring: Burt Reynolds; Dolly Parton; Dom DeLuise; Charles Durning; Jim Nabors
- Cinematography: William A. Fraker
- Edited by: Pembroke J. Herring; David Bretherton; Jack Hofstra; Nicholas Eliopoulos; Walter Hannemann
- Music by: Carol Hall; Patrick Williams
- Production companies: Miller-Milkis-Boyett Productions; RKO Pictures
- Distributed by: Universal Pictures
- Release dates: July 11, 1982 (Austin, premiere); July 23, 1982 (United States)
- Running time: 114 minutes
- Country: United States
- Language: English
- Budget: $20.5–$35 million
- Box office: $69.7 million

The Best Little Whorehouse in Texas is a 1982 American musical comedy film based on the 1978 stage musical by Larry L. King, Peter Masterson, and Carol Hall. Directed by Colin Higgins from a screenplay he co-wrote with Masterson and King, the film stars Burt Reynolds, Dolly Parton, Dom DeLuise, Charles Durning, and Jim Nabors. The story is about the proprietress of a brothel (Parton) and her lover, the local Sheriff (Reynolds), who fight to keep the house open after it's targeted by a moral crusader (DeLuise).

The film was released by Universal Pictures on July 23, 1982. Despite mixed reviews the film was a commercial success, earning the biggest weekend box-office for a musical film at the time. The Best Little Whorehouse in Texas was nominated for two Golden Globe Awards: for Best Motion Picture – Musical or Comedy and Best Actress in a Motion Picture – Musical or Comedy (for Parton). Durning was nominated for the Academy Award for Best Supporting Actor for his role as the Texas governor.

This was Higgins' final theatrical film before his death in 1988.

== Plot ==
Deputy Fred Wilkins introduces the story ("20 Fans") of Ed Earl Dodd, the Sheriff of Lanville County, Texas, who has been in a 12-year relationship with Miss Mona Stangley. Miss Mona runs the "Chicken Ranch", a brothel outside the town of Gilbert in his jurisdiction that has been a fixture of the town since 1910, regardless of legality ("A Lil' Ole Bitty Pissant Country Place"). Occasionally interrupted by Fred, the pair have a pleasant arrangement as secret lovers ("Sneakin' Around with You"). Almost everyone in town approves of Miss Mona, a public-minded citizen who regularly donates to charity and, except for her line of work, is decent and law-abiding.

Mayor Rufus P. Poindexter and insurance salesman C.J. Vernon inform Ed Earl that consumer advocate and television personality Melvin P. Thorpe has announced his intention to do an exposé about the Chicken Ranch on his weekly program The Watchdog Report. After visiting Thorpe in his Houston studio, Ed Earl is shocked when Thorpe reveals to the audience during his show that "Texas Has a Whorehouse in It". While filming a segment in the Gilbert town square, Thorpe accuses Ed Earl of taking payoffs and bribes to protect Miss Mona's business. Ed Earl responds by insulting Thorpe and threatening to physically assault or even incarcerate him should he, his crew, or his chorus of singers named the Dogettes, ever reappear in Gilbert.

The Chicken Ranch is such an institution that the winner of the annual football rivalry between the University of Texas Longhorns and the Texas A&M Aggies on Thanksgiving Day traditionally comes to "celebrate" its victory as arranged by the alumni association of the winning school ("The Aggie Song"). Thorpe's negative publicity, coupled with the footage of Ed Earl insulting him, puts an undesirable spotlight on the place, so Ed Earl asks Miss Mona to shutter the property for two months until the media attention subsides. She complies, closing the bordello to her regular customers but allowing the football players to have their party ("Courtyard Shag").

Infiltrating the property, Thorpe and his crew break into the house and ambush the winning Aggies and State Senator Charles Wingwood, a 1949 Texas A&M University alumnus who represents the 19th Congressional District where the Chicken Ranch is located, on tape in mid-debauch. The next day, Ed Earl and Miss Mona argue over what happened. Mona chastises him for being unavailable to shield her during Thorpe's raid, calling him childish and insulting his standing; in turn, he responds, "It's a hell of a lot better than bein' a whore."

Ed Earl covertly travels to Austin to appeal to the Governor of Texas, who will not decide on any issue without first seeing the results of opinion polls ("The Sidestep"). Despite Ed Earl's eloquent appeal to keep the Chicken Ranch open, the Governor orders him to close it down after polls say 42% of Texans disapprove of the place (37% are in favor, 21% undecided). While leaving the capitol building, Ed Earl confronts a jubilant Thorpe, yanks off his wig, and punches him out as a crew films the confrontation.

Returning to his office, Ed Earl telephones Mona to permanently shutter the whorehouse, and apologizes for their earlier argument. Upon hearing the news, the brothel girls inform her of Ed Earl's valiant, albeit unsuccessful, efforts to salvage the establishment, prompting her to realize that she should forgive him. The next day, the prostitutes disconsolately depart from the Chicken Ranch ("Hard Candy Christmas"). As Miss Mona is departing, Ed Earl halts her and proposes marriage. She declines, aware that being married to the former madam of a notorious whorehouse would damage his chances of running for the state legislature ("I Will Always Love You"). Ed Earl insists upon marrying her regardless, making his point by tossing her luggage into his pickup truck. He then picks up Miss Mona and installs her in the passenger seat before they drive away together.

Fred becomes the new Sheriff, concluding the tale by explaining that Ed Earl and Miss Mona married and Ed Earl later successfully ran for the Texas state legislature.

== Cast ==
- Burt Reynolds as Sheriff Ed Earl Dodd
- Dolly Parton as Mona Stangley (spelled Stangely in the end credits)
- Dom DeLuise as Melvin P. Thorpe
- Charles Durning as the Governor
- Jim Nabors as Deputy Fred Wilkins
- Robert Mandan as Senator Charles Wingwood
- Lois Nettleton as Dulcie Mae
- Theresa Merritt as Jewel
- Noah Beery Jr. (credited as Noah Beery) as Edsel Mackey
- Raleigh Bond as Mayor Rufus P. Poindexter
- Barry Corbin as C.J. Vernon
- Ken Magee as Mansel
- Mary Jo Catlett as Rita Crowell
- Mary Louise Wilson as Miss Modene Ennis
- Lily Mariye, Jennifer Nairn-Smith and Terri Treas as Chicken Ranch girls
- Jeffrey Calhoun, David Engel, David Warren Gibson, Jeffrey Hornaday, and Jerry Mitchell as Aggies
- Gregory Itzin and Timothy Stack as members of Thorpe's crew
- Donald F. Colson as Jeff Gerald
- Helen Kleeb as Dora
- Mickey Jones as Henry
- Bobby Fite as Dulcie Mae's son
- Paula Shaw as Wulla Jean
- Kenneth White as Sheriff Jack Roy Wallace
- Ted Gehring as Sheriff Chapman
- Alice Drummond as Governor's secretary

News anchor Howard K. Smith and sportscasters Verne Lundquist and Lee Grosscup appear as themselves.

== Production ==
=== Development ===
Originally, Larry L. King and Peter Masterson were going to write the screenplay and Masterson and Tommy Tune, who had directed the stage production, were to direct together. King recommended Shirley MacLaine, Dyan Cannon, Carlin Glynn (Masterson's wife, who had originated the role of Mona on Broadway and in London's West End) and Jill Clayburgh as the possibles to star but was told they were not a sufficient box office draw.

When Dolly Parton was cast, King suggested Willie Nelson as a co-star and Universal executives met with him but in the end, Burt Reynolds was cast. Reynolds was paid $3.5 million and Parton $1.5 million.

Reynolds wanted script changes and wanted to sing. Universal became nervous about giving the film to first-time directors and replaced Masterson and Tune with 9 to 5's Colin Higgins.

Reynolds later said Parton "had two directors fired before we started – they were gone. Because I'd made so many movies and she hadn't, everyone thought it was me. Whether she was right or wrong in those decisions, it was amazing to me that she could do it."

Higgins prepared for directing by watching old George Cukor films and Dr Pepper commercials ("They have a lot of wonderful movement", said Higgins.)

Reynolds suggested to Higgins that Charles Durning be cast. "Colin is very smart, very commercial. They wanted Mickey Rooney, so I manipulated him a little. I told Colin, 'Mickey Rooney is a wonderful actor, but everyone knows that. You won't get any credit. Charles Durning can sing and dance and no one knows it, so you'll get all the credit.'"

=== Adaptation ===
While the plot mostly stays true to that of the stage production, the film was restructured to make it a vehicle for Parton and Reynolds. In the play, Ed Earl and Miss Mona had a one-night stand 15 years earlier, but in the film, they maintain an ongoing affair.

In August 1980 King wrote a letter to Frank Rich where he said:

Looks as if Hollywood is gonna really do a number on the Whorehouse movie. Word is that Stevie Phillips isn’t going to be allowed to produce it, Pete and Tommy are out as directors, and they’re bringing in some guy to re-write it so that it will fail to resemble anything of the stage show. The director, I hear, is to be one Colin Higgins; he is advertised as an English fag. Ned Tannen is alleged to have said...that all he wanted of Whorehouse was the title so he could make a film in which “Burt and Dolly screw their brains out.”... Burt Reynolds told Stevie and Pete he wants the movie to be “Smokey and the Bandit visit the Whorehouse.”

The relationship in the film brings about not only the accusatory scene, when the sheriff – disappointed that Mona has broken her promise to close the Chicken Ranch down long enough for things to cool off – calls her a whore, but also the happy ending, when he proposes marriage to Mona even though that might endanger his chances to be elected as a state legislator. The epilogue states that he wins the election anyway.

King later wrote, "Though I was fond of the screenplay Pete Masterson and I put together, let’s face it: even if the Universal nabobs and Burt and Dolly come up with a movie I hardly recognize, they can’t justly be accused of having tampered with Shakespeare or having done violence to art. Whorehouse is an entertainment, pure and simple."

=== Filming ===
Principal photography began on September 21, 1981 in Austin. Shooting took place in the Texas State Capitol (the first feature film to do so) and the Texas Governor's Mansion. Many of the "Gilbert" town exteriors were filmed in the town of Hallettsville, with the Lavaca County Courthouse featuring prominently. The titular house was the Kuempel Haus, a historic farmhouse in the Austin suburb of Pflugerville. A replica of the house was constructed on the Universal Studios Lot, where most of the interiors and musical numbers were shot. The rest of the film was shot in Los Angeles.

Parton described her experience as "a nightmare." She later wrote in her memoirs:

The wonderful time I had on Nine to Five had whetted my appetite for another movie. Whorehouse was a completely opposite experience. It was as if Nine to Five had been my first lover, sweetly seductive before and gentle and caring during our lovemaking. Whorehouse, then, was a rapist.

Parton wrote Reynolds was in a bad mood during filming because he had broken up with Sally Field, alleging, "Sometimes he would just walk off the set, unable to deal with things, and I would be called upon to go to his dressing room and try to cheer him up. That was a little like the blind leading the blind, since I was in an emotional and physical turmoil of my own." She added, "On top of that, people were being fired right and left. In fact, at one point there was a bumper sticker circulating around Hollywood that read, 'HONK IF YOU’VE BEEN FIRED FROM BEST LITTLE WHOREHOUSE'."

For his part, Reynolds described Parton as "very self-deprecating, at least in public."

Parton later wrote, "I’d like to publicly apologize to everyone on that film for any ill will and hurt feelings I might have caused" and said the film was "a miserable, spirit-numbing ordeal."

=== Music ===
Much of Carol Hall's original Broadway score is performed. However, eight songs, "Girl, You're a Woman", "Twenty-Four Hours of Lovin'", "Doatsy Mae", "The Anglette March", "The Bus from Amarillo", "No Lies", "Good Old Girl" and "Finale", were omitted. Two additional Parton compositions appear: "Sneakin' Around", a duet with Parton and Reynolds, and a two-stanza rendition of Parton's 1973 composition "I Will Always Love You". The film version of "I Will Always Love You" — the original recording had been a U.S. country chart-topper for Parton in the spring of 1974 — was released as a single in July 1982, and again reached number one on the U.S. country singles chart. It was also a mid-level hit on Billboard pop and adult contemporary charts. An altered version of Hall's "Hard Candy Christmas", in which Parton sings both the chorus and the verses of the song (as opposed to the film, which is partially sung by the brothel ladies), was also released as a single, reaching the top ten on the country singles chart in late 1982.

Parton wrote several new songs that were filmed but ultimately unused, including "Where Stallions Run" and "A Gamble Either Way". The former was restored for the ABC network television broadcast, as the film was too short for its time slot after the censors finished their edits and additional material was needed. "A Gamble Either Way" replaced "Girl, You're a Woman" and was sung by Parton after Mona interviewed "Shy" (Andrea Pike) for a job at the Chicken Ranch. The characters of Shy and Angel from the Broadway show were significantly reduced in the film; their footage was eventually removed entirely. "Down at the Chicken Ranch" was written for the trailer. Parton recorded two of the deleted songs, "A Gamble Either Way" and "A Cowboy's Ways" (a reworking of "Where Stallions Run"), and featured them on her 1983 album Burlap & Satin.

Musical numbers

1. "20 Fans" – Company
2. "A Lil' Ole Bitty Pissant Country Place" – Mona and Girls
3. "Sneakin' Around" – Mona and Ed Earl
4. "Watchdog Report" – The Dogettes
5. "Texas Has a Whorehouse in It" – Thorpe, The Dogettes and Watchdog Chorus
6. "Texas Has a Whorehouse in It" (reprise) – Thorpe and The Dogettes
7. "The Aggie Song" – The Aggies
8. "Courtyard Shag" (instrumental)
9. "The Sidestep" – The Governor
10. "Texas Has a Whorehouse in It/The Sidestep" (reprise) – Thorpe, Chorus and The Governor
11. "Hard Candy Christmas" – Mona and Girls
12. "I Will Always Love You" – Mona
13. "A Lil' Ole Bitty Pissant Country Place" (reprise) – Company

== Release ==
The film held its world premiere at Paramount Theatre in Austin, Texas on July 11, 1982, and went into wide release on July 23.

=== Marketing ===
The film presented some difficulties for Universal, particularly with advertising. In 1982, the word "whorehouse" was considered obscene in parts of the United States, resulting in the film being renamed The Best Little Cathouse in Texas in some print ads, while television ads were either banned outright in some areas, or the offending word was censored; on WXYZ-TV in Detroit, the announcer on the station's "Now Showing" segment merely clicked his tongue to eliminate the offending word: "The Best Little [click, click] in Texas!" In Canada, the title was generally left alone in print, but televised trailers used a bleep censor over the word. During interviews, Parton sometimes referred to the film as The Best Little Chicken House in Texas.

== Reception ==
=== Box office ===
The Best Little Whorehouse in Texas opened in 1,400 theaters on July 23, 1982, and earned $11,874,268 in its opening weekend, ranking number one in the United States box office, dethroning E.T. The Extra Terrestrial's six-week run at the top of the box office. It was the biggest weekend for a musical film ever. The film grossed $69,701,637 domestically. It went on to become the 10th highest-grossing film of 1982.

=== Critical response ===
The film received mixed reviews from critics. On the review aggregator website Rotten Tomatoes, 50% of 30 critics' reviews are positive. The website's consensus reads: "It has its moments -- and a couple of appealing stars -- but this misguided movie musical largely lacks the crowd-pleasing appeal of the stage version." Metacritic, which uses a weighted average, assigned the film a score of 40 out of 100, based on 10 critics, indicating "mixed or average" reviews.

Roger Ebert of the Chicago Sun-Times gave the film two out of four stars, stating the film was surprisingly dull and didn't make good use of Parton's talents: "If they ever give Dolly her freedom and stop packaging her so antiseptically, she could be terrific. But Dolly and Burt and Whorehouse never get beyond the concept stage in this movie." Chris Hicks of The Deseret News gave a mostly negative review, describing the film as slogging "from one poorly staged musical scene to another", but he highlighted some of the supporting cast as offering bright moments, particularly Jim Nabors.

=== Awards and nominations ===
Ceremony	Category	Nominee(s)	Result	Ref.
55th Academy Awards	Best Supporting Actor	Charles Durning	Nominated	
40th Golden Globe Awards	Best Motion Picture – Musical or Comedy		Nominated	
40th Golden Globe Awards	Best Actress in a Motion Picture – Musical or Comedy	Dolly Parton	Nominated	
25th Grammy Awards	Best Country Vocal Performance, Female	"I Will Always Love You" – Dolly Parton	Nominated	

== Cultural influence ==
The film and the original Broadway musical it was based on were spoofed in the 1982 pornographic film Memphis Cathouse Blues, which starred Annette Haven in the Dolly Parton role of the madam and Mike Horner in the Burt Reynolds role as the sheriff. Porn star Kay Parker, who played one of the sex workers in the film, had an uncredited bit role in The Best Little Whorehouse in Texas.

== Legacy ==
The house used in the film is located at Universal Studios in Hollywood and can be viewed as part of the backlot tram tour. The inspiration for the set came from a real ranch house located outside Austin, Texas, which is featured in scenes from the movie.

The house was shown in the Ghost Whisperer television series episode "The Lost Boys".

The house was also featured in Rob Zombie's 2003 horror film House of 1000 Corpses.

The film was mentioned in an episode of The Venture Bros., where Dr. Venture mistakes it for a pornographic film, given its "racy" history.
