= Sterling Van Wagenen =

American film and stage director, producer and writer

- Born: Sterling Gray Van Wagenen; July 2, 1947 (age 78); Utah, U.S.
- Occupations: Producer, writer, director

Sterling Gray Van Wagenen (born July 2, 1947) is an American film and stage producer, writer, director, and convicted sex offender. He is a co-founder of the Sundance Film Festival, and, in association with his former cousin-in-law Robert Redford, he was the founding executive director of the Sundance Institute.

In 2019, Van Wagenen was convicted of child sexual abuse and sentenced to six years to life in prison.

== Career ==
He has directed four feature films as well as several documentaries and television episodes, and has produced over fourteen feature films, documentaries, and television series, including the Academy Award winning The Trip to Bountiful, co-produced with Horton Foote and starring Geraldine Page and John Heard. He collaborated again with Foote on Convicts, starring Robert Duvall and James Earl Jones.

In 1986, he and Foote were nominated for an Independent Spirit Award as producers of The Trip to Bountiful, and in 1987 they won a Wise Owl Award for the film. In 1992, he won a Crystal Heart Award as director of Alan and Naomi. Van Wagenen's cousin Lola was married to Redford from 1958 to 1985. After 1993, Sterling Van Wagenen had no official connection with the Sundance Film Festival or Sundance Institute.

From 1999 to 2004, he served as Director of the School of Film and Digital Media at the University of Central Florida. He was later Producer-in-Residence and faculty member at the University of Utah.

Van Wagenen was the director of three films that were used in rotation from 2013 though January 2019 during the Endowment Ceremony in temples of the Church of Jesus Christ of Latter-day Saints.

== Personal life ==
He is married to Marilee Jeppson, and they had six children and 20 grandchildren. Their first child, Sarah Ella Van Wagenen, born August 17, 1973, died on March 1, 2014, from cancer.

== Sexual abuse conviction and imprisonment ==
On January 4, 2019, The Truth & Transparency Foundation, a nonprofit group formerly known as "MormonLeaks", posted audio in which Sterling Van Wagenen holds a conversation with a man identified by the alias "David." In the recording, Van Wagenen confesses to molesting the 13-year-old "David" in 1993 during a sleepover. At the time, Van Wagenen confessed the incident to his Stake President and a detective. According to a police report, no charges were filed in the case because the victim's parents declined to pursue them. Van Wagenen was disfellowshipped for 2 years by the LDS Church.

On April 2, 2019, Van Wagenen was charged with the felony aggravated sexual abuse, in Salt Lake City, where he was released on a $75,000 bond. Van Wagenen is alleged to have molested a young girl some time between 2013 and 2015.

The Sundance Institute issued a statement, saying: "Recent reports in the press have made us aware of allegations of sexual abuse by Sterling Van Wagenen, who played a role in founding both the Festival and the Institute. He has no current connection to either entity, and has since he left our Utah Advisory Board in 1993. Sundance Institute categorically denounces his behavior as described in recent reports, and we stand in solidarity with those whose brave truth-telling shines light on abusive behavior."

On April 30, 2019, Van Wagenen pleaded guilty to one charge of aggravated sexual abuse of a child. He was jailed for six years to life on July 2, 2019.
