= Boston Society of Film Critics Awards 1985 =

Film awards edition

6th BSFC Awards

January 26, 1986

Best Film:
Ran

The 6th Boston Society of Film Critics Awards honored the best filmmaking of 1985. The awards were given on 26 January 1986.

== Winners ==
- Best Film:
  - Ran
- Best Actor:
  - Jack Nicholson – Prizzi's Honor
- Best Actress:
  - Geraldine Page – The Trip to Bountiful
- Best Supporting Actor:
  - Ian Holm – Wetherby, Brazil, Dance with a Stranger and Dreamchild
- Best Supporting Actress:
  - Anjelica Huston – Prizzi's Honor
- Best Director:
  - John Huston – Prizzi's Honor
- Best Screenplay:
  - Woody Allen – The Purple Rose of Cairo
- Best Cinematography:
  - Takao Saito and Shoji Ueda – Ran
- Best Documentary:
  - Shoah
- Best English-Language Film:
  - Prizzi's Honor
