= The Best Little Whorehouse Goes Public =

- Original Cast Recording
- Music: Carol Hall
- Lyrics: Carol Hall
- Book: Larry L. King; Peter Masterson
- Basis: Sequel to The Best Little Whorehouse in Texas
- Productions: 1994 Broadway

The Best Little Whorehouse Goes Public is a 1994 musical with a book by Larry L. King and Peter Masterson and music and lyrics by Carol Hall, a sequel to The Best Little Whorehouse in Texas.

== Premise ==
Hoping to recover $26 million in back taxes owed them by Las Vegas whorehouse Stallion Fields, the IRS lures former brothel madam Mona Stangley out of retirement to run the operation. Complications arise when billionaire Sam Dallas arranges the sale of shares in the enterprise on the stock exchange and right-wing politician Senator A. Harry Hardast objects to his plan.

The Vegas locale allows for an ongoing parade of barely dressed showgirls in glitzy Bob Mackie costumes, Sonny and Cher, Elvis Presley, Liberace, and Siegfried and Roy impersonators, and a two-bit stand-up comic acting as emcee against a background of flashing neon lights and accompanied by the sound of ever-jangling slot machines.

== Cast and characters ==
Character	Broadway (1994)
Mona Stangley	Dee Hoty
Sam Dallas	Scott Holmes
A. Harry Hardast	Ronn Carroll
I. R. S. Director	Kevin Cooney
The Comedian	Jim David
President / Schmidt / B.S. Bullehit	David Doty
Terri Clark	Gina Torres
Ralph J. Bostick	Danny Rutigliano
Lotta Lovingood	Pamela Everett

== Musical numbers ==
Act I

- Let the Devil Take Us
- Nothin' Like a Picture Show
- I'm Leavin' Texas
- It's Been a While
- Brand New Start

Act II

- Down and Dirty
- Call Me
- Change In Me
- Here for the Hearing
- Piece of the Pie
- Change In Me (Reprise)
- If We Open Our Eyes

An original cast recording was released by Varèse Sarabande.

== Production history ==
After 28 previews, the Broadway production, directed by Tommy Tune and Peter Masterson and choreographed by Tune and Jeff Calhoun, opened on May 10, 1994 at the Lunt-Fontanne Theatre, where it ran for only 16 performances. The cast included Dee Hoty as Mona, Scott Holmes as Sam, Ronn Carroll as the Senator, and Jim David as the emcee.

== Nominations ==
- 48th Tony Awards: Best Actress in a Musical
- Drama Desk Awards: Outstanding Orchestrations
- Drama Desk Awards: Outstanding Costume Design of a Musical
