= Secret Window =

2004 film directed by David Koepp

- Theatrical release poster
- Directed by: David Koepp
- Screenplay by: David Koepp
- Based on: Secret Window, Secret Garden by Stephen King
- Produced by: Gavin Polone; Ezra Swerdlow
- Starring: Johnny Depp; John Turturro; Maria Bello; Timothy Hutton; Charles S. Dutton
- Cinematography: Fred Murphy
- Edited by: Jill Savitt
- Music by: Philip Glass; Geoff Zanelli
- Production companies: Columbia Pictures; Pariah
- Distributed by: Sony Pictures Releasing
- Release date: March 12, 2004
- Running time: 96 minutes
- Country: United States
- Language: English
- Budget: $40 million
- Box office: $92.1 million

Secret Window is a 2004 American thriller film starring Johnny Depp and John Turturro. It was written and directed by David Koepp, based on the novella Secret Window, Secret Garden by Stephen King, featuring a musical score by Philip Glass and Geoff Zanelli. The story appeared in King's 1990 collection Four Past Midnight and follows a struggling writer who is terrorized by an elusive adversary while dealing with an ongoing divorce from his estranged wife and tolerating her new boyfriend. The film was released on March 12, 2004, by Sony Pictures Releasing through its Columbia Pictures label; it was a moderate box office success and received mixed reviews from critics.

== Plot ==
After catching his wife Amy having an affair with their friend Ted, mystery writer Mort Rainey retreats to his cabin in upstate New York. Six months later, Mort, depressed and suffering from writer's block, has delayed finalizing the divorce.

A man named John Shooter arrives at the cabin and accuses Mort of plagiarizing his short story, "Sowing Season". Upon reading Shooter's manuscript, Mort discovers it is virtually identical to his own story, "Secret Window", except for the ending. The following day, Mort, who once plagiarized another author's story, tells Shooter that his story was published in a mystery magazine before Shooter's, invalidating his claim. Shooter demands proof and warns Mort against contacting the police. That night, Mort's dog, Chico, is found dead outside the cabin, along with a note from Shooter giving Mort three days.

Mort reports the incident to Sheriff Newsome. Mort drives to his and Amy's house to retrieve a copy of the magazine, but he leaves because Ted and Amy are there. Mort hires private investigator Ken Karsch, who stakes out the cabin and speaks to Tom Greenleaf, a local resident. At the cabin, Shooter appears and demands that Mort revise the ending of his story, giving it Shooter's twist, in which the protagonist kills his wife. When a fire destroys Amy and Mort's house, and presumably the magazine, Mort tells the police that he has an enemy.

Mort and Karsch agree to confront Shooter but first plan to meet up with Greenleaf at the local diner the next morning, but neither Karsch nor Greenleaf show up. On his way home, Mort encounters Ted, who demands that Mort sign the divorce papers. Believing Shooter is in Ted's employ, Mort refuses.

Later, Shooter summons Mort; when he arrives, Mort finds Karsch and Greenleaf dead. Shooter tells Mort he killed the two men because they "interfered." He warns Mort that he has implicated him in their murders and implies Mort should dispose of the bodies. Mort agrees to meet Shooter at his cabin to show him the magazine containing his story, which has been sent overnight by his agent. Mort disposes of the bodies.

Mort retrieves the package containing the magazine from the post office but finds that it has already been opened; the pages containing his story have been cut out. After a series of startling events, Mort realizes that Shooter is a figment of his imagination, unwittingly created to cope with his anger and carry out malevolent tasks that Mort cannot do – like killing Chico, Greenleaf, and Karsch, as well as burning down Amy's home.

Amy arrives at the cabin, finding it ransacked, and she sees the word "SHOOTER" carved repeatedly on the walls and furniture. Mort appears, having been taken over by the "Shooter" persona. Amy realizes the name "Shooter" represents Mort's desire to "SHOOT HER". Mort stabs Amy in the leg. Ted arrives and is killed by Mort while Amy watches helplessly. Mort approaches her while reciting the ending of "Sowing Season".

Months later, Mort has recovered from his writer's block, and his passion for life has returned. He is feared and shunned in town because of the rumors about the murders. Sheriff Newsome arrives and tells Mort that he is the prime suspect and that the bodies will eventually be found. Mort passively dismisses the threat and tells Newsome that the ending to his new story is "perfect". It is implied that Amy and Ted's bodies are buried under the corn growing in Mort's garden.

=== Alternative ending ===
An alternate ending was included on the home media release, explicitly showing both Ted's and Amy's dead bodies underneath the corn patch in Mort's garden.

== Cast ==
- Johnny Depp as Morton "Mort" Rainey
- John Turturro as John Shooter
- Maria Bello as Amy Rainey
- Timothy Hutton as Ted "Teddy" Milner
- Len Cariou as Sheriff Dave Newsome
- Charles S. Dutton as Private Investigator Ken Karsch
- John Dunn-Hill as Tom Greenleaf

== Production ==
Part of Secret Window was filmed in the town of North Hatley, Quebec in the Eastern Townships approximately two hours south east of Montreal. Other filming locations included Lake Massawippi, Lake Sacacomie, Lake Gale and the village of Bromont, Quebec.

According to director David Koepp on the DVD commentary track, the footage of the ocean scene during Mort's restless night on the couch was extra b-roll footage taken from The Lost World: Jurassic Park.

The film's ending is different from the source novella. In the novella, Ted and Amy survive Mort's attempt on their lives, and Mort dies. It is also revealed that through supernatural forces, the fictional John Shooter had manifested and come to life from Mort's imagination, and really was the one to commit the murders and arson.

== Reception ==
Roger Ebert awarded Secret Window three stars out of a possible four, stating that it "could add up to a straight-faced thriller about things that go boo in the night, but Johnny Depp and director David Koepp ... have too much style to let that happen." He continues by noting that the "story is more entertaining as it rolls along than it is when it gets to the finish line. But at least King uses his imagination right up to the end, and spares us the obligatory violent showdown that a lesser storyteller would have settled for." Ian Nathan from Empire only awarded the film 2 stars out of a possible 5, stating that "The presence of the sublime Depp will be enough to get Secret Window noticed, but even his latest set of rattling eccentricities is not enough to energise this deadbeat parlour trick."

On Rotten Tomatoes, Secret Window has an approval rating of 46% based on 160 reviews, with an average rating of 5.50/10. The site's critics' consensus reads: "Depp is quirkily entertaining, but the movie runs out of steam by the end." On Metacritic, the film has an aggregated score of 46 out of 100 based on 34 critics, indicating "Mixed or average reviews". Audiences polled by CinemaScore gave the film an average grade of "C+" on an A+ to F scale.

The film was a modest box office success, succeeding at recouping its budget of $40 million with a worldwide gross of $92.1 million.

== See also ==
- List of films featuring mental illness
