= Mona Richardson =

- Born: February 5, 1947; Los Angeles, California, U.S.
- Died: August 5, 1985 (aged 38) Melbourne, Australia
- Genres: Soul, jazz, pop, disco
- Occupation: Singer
- Labels: Philips; EMI; Euromaster Stereocolor; Ela Ton; RCA Victor; Toshiba-EMI Ltd; Epic

Mona Richardson (February 5, 1947 – August 5, 1985) was an American-born singer and actress who had performed with Johnny Otis, Ray Charles and Ike Turner. She ended up in Australia, where she died in 1985. She released a number of singles and albums for the Philips, RCA Victor and EMI labels.

== Background ==
Mona Richardson was a blues, jazz and soul singer. She was born in Los Angeles, California, on February 5, 1947. She came to Australia in 1980 and decided to stay. She was still in Australia when she died in 1985.

== Career ==
=== 1970s ===
Around the mid-1970s, she was being showcased at the Trophy Lounge in Las Vegas, the same venue where Judy Carp and The Rich Bono Duo appeared. In May 1967, she was in Singapore, appearing at the Shangri-La Hotel's Tiara Supper Club from the 10th to the 31st. In June 1977, Richardson was performing at the Hilton Hotel in Singapore.

In 1978, her selft-titled Mona Richardson album was released on EMI. It was produced by Swedish born Hong Kong based musician, Anders Nelsson who also contributed backing vocals. In 1979, her Disco Dazzler album was released. It was arranged and conducted by Hong Kong producer Chris Babida who would also work on albums for Andy Bautista and Sam Sorono.

=== 1980s ===
She appeared on Sharifah Aini's Just for You album, which was released in 1980. The one song she contributed to was "Reunited", which was a hit for Peaches & Herb in 1978. She came to Australia that year as part of a theatrical tour and decided to stay in the city of Melbourne. In September that year she was starring alongside Lorraine Bayly and Alfred Sandor in the stage production of The Best Little Whorehouse in Texas at Her Majesty's Theatre in New South Wales, which was directed by Jerry Yoder.

In January 1982, she was a cast member of the production Barnum which played at Adelaide's Festival Theater. She gave an impressive performance as Joice Heth in the first part. Later in the show she returned in a different form as the Blues Singer and made an impactful performance which was described by Theatre Australia magazine, "to grab the show by the scruff of the neck to strut and shake out "Black and White". Her performance was also noted by The Sydney Morning Herald and the reviewer referred to her as "a brilliant presence".

In early 1985, she had landed a regular spot at the Crab Cooker Supper Club at 482 Victoria Street, North Melbourne.

== Death ==
She died in Melbourne Australia on August 5, 1985, as a result from falling to her death from her apartment. The cause of death was deemed to be suicide.

== Discography ==
Singles
Title	Release	Year	Notes #
"Stay with Me" / "Heartbeat"	RCA Victor RCA 2309	1973	
"Crumbs Off The Table" / "You're No Good"	RCA Victor RCA 2340	1973	
"Bang, Bang" / "The House Of The Rising Sun"	EMI Japan EMR-20488	1978	
"Bang Bang" / "House Of The Rising Sun"	Toshiba-EMI Ltd EMR-20488	1978	Japanese promo

Albums
Album title	Release	Year	Notes #
Try It, You'll Like It	Philips 6455501	1977	
Mona Richardson	EMI EMGS-6040	1978	Released in France as Disco Mania
Disco Dazzler	EMI EMGS 6054	1979	
Live	Euromaster Stereocolor LP 768		

== Stage ==
Appearances
Title	Venue	Director	Role	Date	Notes
Barnum	Her Majesty's Theatre; Melbourne, Victoria			16 June 1982	
Barnum	Regent Theatre; Sydney, NSW			5 March 1982	
Barnum	Festival Theatre; Adelaide, SA			13 January 1982	
The Best Little Whorehouse in Texas	Her Majesty's Theatre; Sydney, NSW,			13 September 1980	
The Best Little Whorehouse in Texas	Her Majesty's Theatre; Melbourne, VIC			7 February 1981	
