= David Warren Gibson =

American painter

David Warren Gibson was born in Royal Oak, Michigan, the son of Sonja Würfel, a ballet dancer from Leipzig, Germany, and Samuel Warren Gibson, an American diplomat for the U.S.State Department in Berlin and the Hague. He has one brother. His family moved to Minneapolis, Minnesota when he was 3 years old. David attended Westwood Jr. High School and studied art at the Minneapolis Art Institute. He had his first solo show of paintings when he was 13 at the Theater in the Round. At the same time, he worked with the Eleanor Moore Agency as a model for print ads. His family then moved to Dallas, Texas, where he attended Richardson High School. David acted in school plays and continued painting. He also studied dance in the evenings at S.M.U. After graduating from High School, his family moved to Houston, Texas, where David attended the University of St. Thomas and the University of Houston. He was also signed with a local male modeling agency doing print ads and runway work. The Wilhelmina Modeling Agency invited him to come to N.Y. to sign with them. David took the opportunity and moved to N.Y. where he studied acting with Susan Batson from the Actors Studio, and attended the Parsons School of Design.

== Performing career ==
David's first audition in N.Y. was for Bob Fosse (1978) who cast him in the Broadway show Dancin' , in which he performed for 17 months. Additional Broadway credits include Dreamgirls (1981), Sweet Charity (as Charley Dark Glasses) (1986), and Chicago (as Aaron)(1996–2003). David traveled with Liza Minnelli in the production By Myself (1983) performing in the two-man act directed by Fred Ebb. This show traveled throughout the U.S. and also appeared at the Apollo in London. Off-Broadway, David played Starbuck in The Rainmaker (1982) and Edmund in Long Day's Journey into Night (1982). He also toured in the pre-Broadway Busker Alley

He has played small roles, usually uncredited, in several movies, including The Best Little Whorehouse in Texas credited as "Aggie" (member of Aggie choir) (1982), Annie (1982), The Last Dragon"(1985), A Chorus Line (1985), Postcards from the Edge" (uncredited)(1990), Havana (Sailor) (1990), and Bugsy (1991).

Television specials include Julie Andrews' Invitation to the Dance where he performed with Ann Reinking (1980), and with Diana Ross in her legendary concert in Central Park. (1983). He has performed numerous times on the Tony, Emmy, and Academy Awards shows as well as for Broadway on Broadway, in Times Square, and at The Kennedy Center Honors, performing with Bebe Neuwirth, Chita Rivera and the cast of "Chicago."

In 2006, David assisted on the L.A. Opera's production of Manon under the music direction of Plácido Domingo, with Anna Netrebko and Rolando Villazon.

In 2011, David was associate director and choreographer for Fifty*Four*Forever with director Tommy Tune at the University of Miami.

== Fine artist ==
David had his first solo exhibition of paintings at age 13 in Minneapolis. His paintings have been purchased by art collectors around the world. A book of his work was published by Left Coast Galleries in 2009.
