= Carlin Glynn =

American singer and actress (1940–2023)

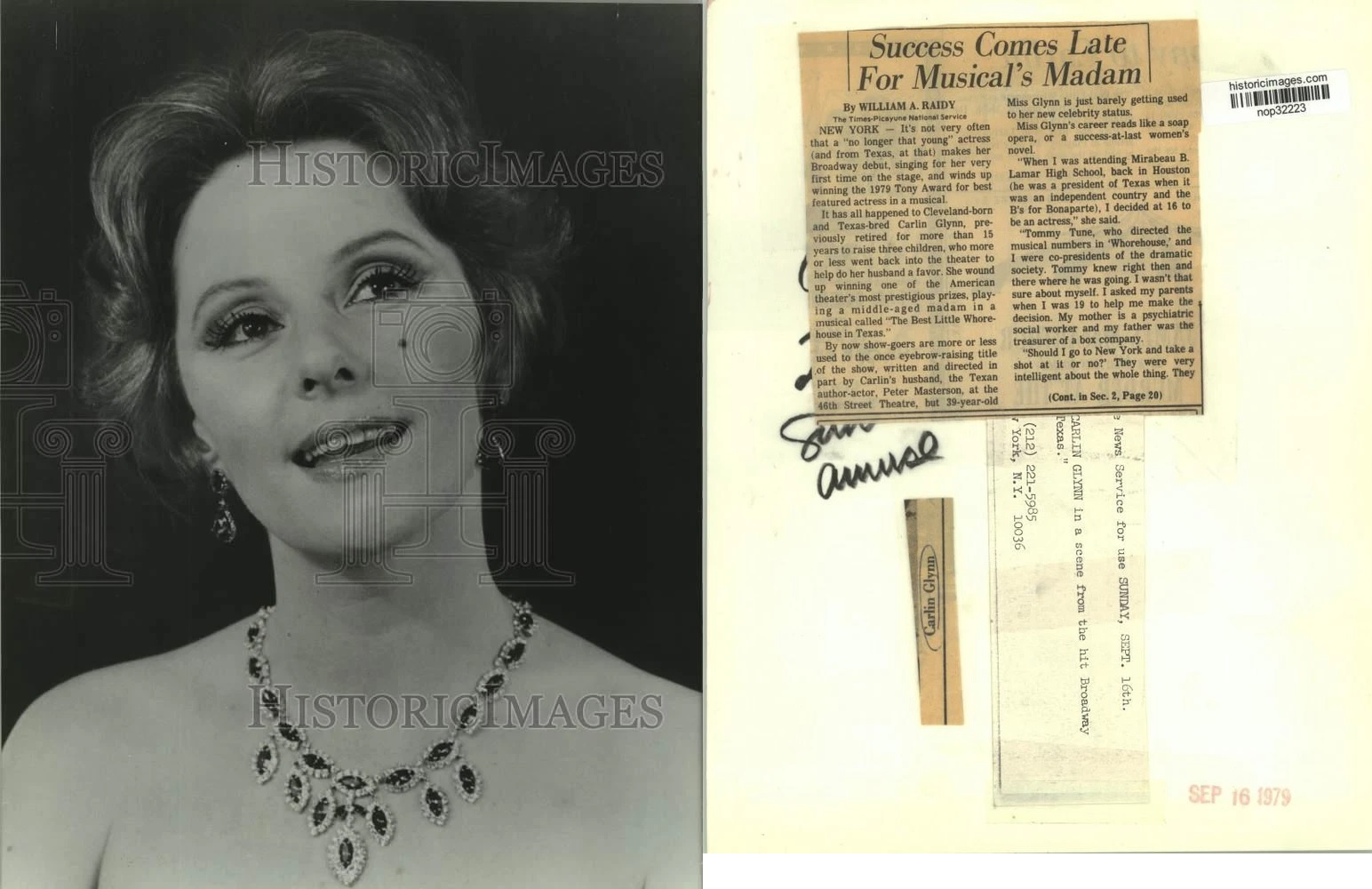
- Glynn in 1979
- Born: Carlin Elizabeth Glynn; February 19, 1940; Cleveland, Ohio, U.S.
- Died: July 13, 2023 (aged 83); New York, U.S.
- Education: Newcomb College
- Occupations: Actress, singer
- Years active: 1975–2006
- Spouse: Peter Masterson (m. 1960; died 2018)
- Children: 3, including Mary Stuart Masterson

Carlin Elizabeth Glynn (February 19, 1940 – July 13, 2023) was an American singer and actress. Most notable for her work as a theater performer, she is best known for her Tony Award-winning performance, as Mona Stangley, in the original 1978 production of The Best Little Whorehouse in Texas. She is also known for her roles in John Hughes' Sixteen Candles (1984) and Peter Masterson's The Trip to Bountiful (1985), which is based on the play of the same name, by Horton Foote. Glynn was the mother of actress Mary Stuart Masterson.

== Early life ==
Glynn was born in Cleveland, Ohio. She attended Mirabeau B. Lamar High School in Houston, Texas.

== Career ==
A life member of The Actors Studio, Glynn made her belated but Tony-winning Broadway debut - as 1979's Outstanding Featured Actress in a Musical - portraying "Mona Stangley" in the original production of The Best Little Whorehouse in Texas, a musical comedy adapted by Glynn's husband and fellow Studio member, Peter Masterson, from a non-fiction article published in Playboy, in collaboration with the article's author, Larry L. King, and songwriter Carol Hall, and developed at length in workshop performances at the Studio. Glynn's award-winning performance would be reprised in the 1982 revival.

Glynn's first movie appearance was as Mae Barber in Three Days of the Condor (1975). She is also known for her role as mother to Molly Ringwald's character in Sixteen Candles (1984), and as daughter-in-law to Geraldine Page's character in The Trip to Bountiful (1985), directed by her husband.

Other film credits include roles in Resurrection (1980), Continental Divide (1981), The Escape Artist (1982), Gardens of Stone (1987; in which her husband and daughter also had roles), Blood Red (1989), Night Game (1989), Convicts (1991), Judy Berlin (1999) and Whiskey School (2005).

== Death ==
Carlin Glynn Masterson died at her home in upstate New York on July 13, 2023, aged 83. She had lung cancer and dementia.

Mary Stuart Masterson announced her mother's death on Instagram:

On Thursday, July 13th, my mother, Carlin Glynn Masterson, passed away. I was with her. I will always be grateful for those last moments, no matter how hard.

Death is like birth in the oddest way. From my first breath to her last. This thread is as fragile as it is strong.

She was the most graceful clumsy person you would ever meet. Strong, smart, silly, intuitive, kind, generous, passionate and a deep listener. She was devoted to my father and to the enormous circle of students and collaborators who were considered her chosen family.

The stanza is from Seamus Heaney's poem, Clearances.

The last photo is from her 80th birthday party, before the worst of dementia and cancer took their toll. She never lost her sense of joy or wonder. The silly guy pictured with her is my dear brother @seppisigh

Rest in peace, mommy.

== Filmography ==
Film
Year	Title	Role	Notes
1975	Three Days of the Condor	Mae Barber	
1980	Resurrection	Suzy Kroll	
1981	Continental Divide	Sylvia McDermott	
1982	The Escape Artist	Treasurer's Secretary	
1984	Sixteen Candles	Brenda Baker	
1985	The Trip to Bountiful	Jessie Mae	
1987	Gardens of Stone	Mrs. Feld	
1989	Coyote Mountain	Mother	Short
1989	Blood Red	Miss Jeffreys	
1989	Night Game	Alma	
1991	Convicts	Asa	
1994	Blessing	Arlene	
1996	Red Sky at Night	—N/a	Consulting editor
1999	Judy Berlin	Maddie	
2002	West of Here	Sally Blackwell	Also co-producer
2003	Lost Junction	Waitress	
2005	Whiskey School	Pamela Evans	

Television
Year	Title	Role	Notes
1983	Johnny Garage	Harriet	TV movie
1986	One Life to Live	Dr. Spender	4 episodes
1987	Mr. President	Meg Tresch	Season 1 (main role, 10 episodes)
1991	A Woman Named Jackie	Lady Bird Johnson	Miniseries (2 episodes)
1992	Day-O	Margaret DeGeorgio	TV movie
1996	Strange Luck	Marilyn Harper	Season 1 (guest role, 1 episode)
2005	The Exonerated	Judge	TV movie
2006	Law & Order: Criminal Intent	Ella Quinn	Season 5 (guest role, 1 episode)

Preceded by Estelle Parsons; Vacant (2003-2004)	Artistic Director of the Actors Studio; 2004-2007; With: Lee Grant; Stephen Lang (2004-2006)	Succeeded by Ellen Burstyn
