= Gardens of Stone =

1987 film by Francis Ford Coppola

- Theatrical release poster
- Directed by: Francis Ford Coppola
- Screenplay by: Ronald Bass
- Based on: Gardens of Stone; 1983 novel by Nicholas Proffitt
- Produced by: Francis Ford Coppola; Michael I. Levy
- Starring: James Caan; Anjelica Huston; James Earl Jones; D. B. Sweeney; Dean Stockwell; Mary Stuart Masterson
- Cinematography: Jordan Cronenweth
- Edited by: Barry Malkin
- Music by: Carmine Coppola
- Production companies: American Zoetrope; ML Delphi Premier Productions
- Distributed by: Tri-Star Pictures
- Release date: May 8, 1987
- Running time: 112 minutes
- Country: United States
- Language: English
- Budget: $13.5 million
- Box office: $5.2 million

Gardens of Stone is a 1987 American drama film directed by Francis Ford Coppola, based on a 1983 novel of the same name by Nicholas Proffitt. It stars James Caan, Anjelica Huston, James Earl Jones, D. B. Sweeney, Dean Stockwell and Mary Stuart Masterson.

== Plot ==
In 1968, during the Vietnam War, Sergeant First Class Clell Hazard is a hardened veteran of Korea and Vietnam who would rather be an instructor at the U.S. Army Infantry School at Fort Benning to train soldiers for Vietnam but instead is assigned to the 1st Battalion 3rd Infantry Regiment (The Old Guard) at Fort Myer, Virginia, which provides the ceremonial honor guard for the funerals of fallen soldiers and guards the Tomb of the Unknown Soldier at Arlington National Cemetery. Hazard calls them the "toy soldiers" and hates his job until Jackie Willow, the son of an old friend and fellow soldier, is assigned to his platoon; Hazard sees in him an opportunity to make sure at least one man comes home from Vietnam alive.

Hazard tries to warn Willow about Vietnam but Willow sees it as his duty as a soldier to fight for his country, no matter what kind of war it is facing. Hazard hates how the war in Vietnam is being fought and feels that good soldiers are being wounded and killed in the "wrong" war in which the U.S. is not fighting to win.

Among the others in Hazard's life are his longtime friend and superior, Sergeant Major "Goody" Nelson, and his girlfriend Samantha Davis, a writer for The Washington Post who is against the Vietnam War for different reasons. Willow marries a colonel's daughter named Rachel Feld, who at first refuses to marry Jackie as long as he is a soldier. Rachel also hates the war in Vietnam and is afraid for her husband.

Hazard is divorced and hasn't seen his son in years. After Willow's father, who is a retired U.S. Army master sergeant and a former Korean War comrade in arms of Hazard's and Nelson's, dies of a heart attack, Hazard comes to look upon Willow as a "son." He tries to teach Willow all he can about soldiering and surviving in combat.

Willow in turn tries to teach his platoon-mate Private Albert Wildman, a chronic screw-up, how to be a soldier. Wildman is later ordered to Vietnam, where he distinguishes himself as a heroic soldier and effective combat infantryman. He returns from Vietnam promoted to the rank of sergeant and is a recipient of the Medal of Honor for heroism in combat. Sergeant Flanagan, a fellow member of Hazard's platoon, receives his orders for Vietnam at the same time.

Willow excels, is promoted to sergeant and is recommended to attend Officer's Candidate School, which he completes and is commissioned as a second lieutenant. He is ordered to serve in a combat unit in Vietnam. Willow writes Hazard from Vietnam about all the good men in his platoon that are being lost in combat. Hazard then finds out that Willow has been killed in action when he sees the burial orders for Willow's remains.

Hazard requests to be sent to Vietnam for his third tour of duty as a platoon sergeant in a combat infantry unit. He places his Combat Infantryman Badge on Willow's flag-draped coffin at the chapel at Arlington National Cemetery. Wildman and Flanagan, at that time both sergeants and just recently returned from Vietnam, are also present at Willow's funeral.

The film ends with military honors being rendered at Willow's graveside at Arlington and Hazard speaking to the mourners prior to the firing of the rifle salute and the playing of "Taps".

== Cast ==
- James Caan as Sergeant First Class Clell Hazard, platoon sergeant
- Anjelica Huston as Samantha Davis
- James Earl Jones as Sergeant Major "Goody" Nelson, regimental sergeant major
- D. B. Sweeney as Specialist / Sergeant / Second Lieutenant Jack "Jackie" Willow, Honor Guardsman
- Dean Stockwell as Captain Homer Thomas, Hazard's company commander
- Mary Stuart Masterson as Rachel Feld
- Dick Anthony Williams as First Sergeant R. "Slasher" Williams, company first sergeant
- Lonette McKee as Betty Rae Nelson, Sergeant Major Nelson's wife
- Sam Bottoms as Second Lieutenant / First Lieutenant Webber, Hazard's platoon leader
- Elias Koteas as Specialist / Sergeant Pete Deveber, company clerk
- Larry Fishburne as Sergeant / Specialist Flanagan, Willow's squad leader
- Casey Siemaszko as Private First Class / Sergeant Albert Wildman, a fellow soldier in the platoon
- Peter Masterson as Colonel Feld
- Carlin Glynn as Mrs. Feld

== Production ==
The film marked James Caan's return to filmmaking after a five-year absence.

Griffin O'Neal was initially cast in Gardens of Stone to play Albert Wildman, but was replaced by Casey Siemaszko after his involvement in the accidental speedboating death of Coppola's eldest son, Gian-Carlo Coppola, in May 1986.

== Release ==
The film was entered into the 15th Moscow International Film Festival.

The movie had a limited release in 612 theaters and made $1,645,588 on its opening weekend, for a total domestic gross of $5,262,047.

== Critical reception ==
The film earned mixed reviews from critics and holds a 41% rating on Rotten Tomatoes based on 17 reviews, with an average rating of 4.9/10.

Film critic Roger Ebert wrote that the film "creates its characters with realism, love and detail" and that the "performances are wonderful", but noted that the "story is just what it seems to be, and somehow we want it to be more than that." Writing in The Washington Post, critic Hal Hinson reported that the film "can't in any way be counted a success, but it's not a disaster either", that "it's been written for the screen ... in a flatfooted comic-book style, and about halfway through the whole thing collapses in a heap", and regarding Coppola's direction, "it's a bit like watching a gifted athlete learn to walk again after a serious injury."
