= Alfred Sandor =

American actor (1918–1983)

- Born: Alfred Sandwina; November 5, 1918; Budapest, Hungary
- Died: September 22, 1983 (aged 64); Sydney, New South Wales, Australia
- Occupations: Actor and Singer
- Years active: c.1945–1983 (as actor)
- Spouse: Barbara James
- Parent(s): Max Heymann; Katie Sandwina

Alfred Sandor (November 5, 1918 – September 22, 1983), born Alfred Sandwina, and billed early in his career as Al Sandwina, was a Hungarian-born American and Australian character actor and singer. He was also credited as Al Sander and Al Sandor.

== Early life and career ==
Sandor was born in Budapest, Hungary during the turmoil of the Hungarian Revolutions and Interventions, He spent his early years travelling with the circus, where his mother, Katie Sandwina, was a circus strongwoman, and he had a background as a ringmaster (circus). After a brief career working as a boxer in New York City, he was a spy behind enemy lines during World War II.

== Acting career ==
After World War II he returned to America, where he established himself as an actor, appearing in Broadway productions and musical theatre. On US television he appeared on The Phil Silvers Show, in a single episode of Dark Shadows in 1968 (playing Sheriff George Patterson) and on Our Five Daughters. His theatre work included Neil Simon's The Odd Couple, and Gypsy opposite Ethel Merman. His film work included The Return of Captain Invincible.

Sandor later travelled to Australia (where he took up citizenship), to appear in a touring production of Plaza Suite, the play The Best Little Whorehouse in Texas (with Lorraine Bayly and Mona Richardson), and he appeared in the film Nickel Queen, whilst doing television work with roles in Number 96, Division 4, Boney and The Evil Touch. However, he would become best known for his long-running role as the "dandy" surgeon Dr. Raymond Shaw in the Australian television soap opera The Young Doctors. An original cast member of the serial, he continued in the role for six years, leaving around 20 episodes before the programme's conclusion due to ill health.

== Death ==
After suffering from ill health for some time, he died of lung cancer in Sydney, Australia in 1983, aged 64.
