= Jim David =

American stand-up comedian

- Born: Asheville, North Carolina
- Education: Furman University, Southern Methodist University
- Occupations: Stand-up comedian, playwright, novelist
- Years active: 1986–present
- Known for: South Pathetic
- Website: www.comicjimdavid.com

Jim David is an American comedian, actor and writer. He is originally from Asheville, North Carolina, and lives in New York City.

David has released five albums on Stand Up! Records, most recently 2021's Gay Jokes For Straight Cruisers, which reached No. 1 on the iTunes comedy chart.

== Early life ==
David was born and raised in Asheville, North Carolina. His parents were heavily involved in local theater, and as a youth David appeared in many shows at the Tanglewood Children's Theater and Asheville Community Theater, starting as a munchkin in The Wizard of Oz. He graduated from Furman University in 1976 with a degree in drama. He began graduate school at Southern Methodist University, but left to pursue acting in New York City. Before turning to comedy full-time, David was a high school drama teacher in Long Island, sold office supplies, and, he told one interviewer, "I did singing telegrams dressed as a chicken or a pink gorilla."

== Career ==
David began performing stand-up in 1986, after several years as an actor in mostly Off-Broadway shows in New York.

Describing David's comedy style, critic Richard Lanoie of The Serious Comedy Site said that his "forte is everyday observational comedy with a penchant for the absurd", and praised him as "a bit of a chameleon" for his ability to create and inhabit different characters. While his material is not heavily political, David does not avoid political topics, such as abortion, religious fundamentalism, and LGBT issues.

=== Television and film ===
David came out onstage in the 1990s. In 2000, he became the first openly gay male comedian to have his own Comedy Central special, with his appearance on Comedy Central Presents, which aired December 10, 2000.

From 2002 to 2004, he was a regular guest on Tough Crowd with Colin Quinn. He was a comedy consultant in 2004 on Queer Eye for the Straight Guy. He has also appeared on The Tonight Show with Jay Leno, The View, HLN's The Joy Behar Show, Star Search, A&E's Evening at the Improv, AXS TV's Gotham Comedy Live, BBC America's The World Stands Up, Bravo's Great Things About Being..., and on MTV, Showtime, and VH1.

He appeared in the 1994 George Lucas-produced film Radioland Murders.

=== Stage ===
David made his Broadway debut in the 1994 musical The Best Little Whorehouse Goes Public as the Las Vegas emcee, listed in the credits as "Comedian." He appears on the Varèse Sarabande Original Cast Recording. David wrote most of his own part, drawing on his stand-up experience.

In 2010, David wrote, produced and starred in the one-man show South Pathetic, about a doomed production of A Streetcar Named Desire at a small Southern community theater, in which David plays himself and 10 other characters. He has performed the show across the country, including the New York International Fringe Festival, and the Provincetown Tennessee Williams Festival. The New York Times called the show "rich with Southern flavor" and David "a tirelessly gregarious trouper."

David won a Bistro Award in 1998, honoring his work as a cabaret and comedy performer. He is a three-time winner and nine-time nominee of the Manhattan Association of Cabarets' award for best stand-up comedian.

=== Other work ===
In 2012, he released a novel, You'll Be Swell (Trumbull Press), about a struggling actress who falls off a cruise ship, which begins a chain reaction that makes her famous.

He was a frequent contributor to the Huffington Post and The Advocate.

From 2011 to 2014, David hosted the podcast Jim David's Icons, a series of conversations with people from the worlds of theater, comedy and politics.

=== Albums ===
Gay Jokes was recorded in March 2020 on a tourist cruise ship to Spain. The Interrobang called it "intimate, international, irrepressible comedy [that] stands up for comedians' rights to say what they want." The Serious Comedy Site's Lanoie called it "an absolute blast". Bobby Patrick of BroadwayWorld called it "a crazy quilt of hilarity" that showcased David's rapport with his audience.

David has released four other albums on Stand Up!, including expanded versions of his self-released discs, Live From Jimville and Eat Here and Get Gas. Lanoie called Live From Jimville "very enjoyable" and reminiscent of Rodney Dangerfield. Jake Austen of Roctober magazine, reviewing his first three albums, was slightly less positive, calling David "a confident, veteran comic" but stating he found his material "charmingly lame".

== Personal life ==
David has been with his husband for more than 30 years. He lives in New York.

== See also ==
- Fire Island Pines
- LGBT culture in New York City
- List of LGBT people from New York City
- NYC Pride March

== Discography ==
- Jim David, Gay Jokes for Straight Cruisers (Stand Up! Records, 2021)
- Various Artists, Pride Parade Of Standup, Volume 1, (digital download, Virtual Comedy Network, 2020)
- Jim David, Hard to Swallow (Stand Up! Records, 2015)
- Jim David, Notorious F.A.G. (Stand Up! Records, 2010)
- Jim David, Live From Jimville (self-released 2003, re-released on Stand Up! Records, 2008)
- Jim David, Eat Here and Get Gas (self-released 2000, re-released on Stand Up! Records, 2007)
