= Blood Red (film) =

1989 film

- Theatrical release poster
- Directed by: Peter Masterson
- Screenplay by: Ron Cutler
- Produced by: Judd Bernard; Patricia Casey
- Starring: Eric Roberts; Giancarlo Giannini; Dennis Hopper; Burt Young; Carlin Glynn; Lara Harris; Joseph Runningfox; Al Ruscio; Michael Madsen; Elias Koteas
- Cinematography: Toyomichi Kurita
- Edited by: Randy D. Thornton
- Music by: Carmine Coppola
- Production company: Kettledrum Productions
- Distributed by: Hemdale Film Corporation
- Release date: August 18, 1989 (United States)
- Running time: 91 minutes
- Countries: United States; United Kingdom
- Language: English
- Box office: $15,510 (Domestic)

Blood Red is a 1989 American Western film directed by Peter Masterson and starring Eric Roberts, Giancarlo Giannini, Burt Young, Lara Harris and Dennis Hopper. Although it was filmed and completed in 1986, the film was released three years later in 1989. Part of the filming for Blood Red occurred at the Picchetti Brothers Winery in Cupertino, California.

== Synopsis ==
Set in the 1890s, the story centers around the life of a Sicilian family, the Collogeros, who live in California and work in the winemaking business, and their confrontation with the powerful railroad and land baron William Bradford Berrigan, who is after their land and the land that belonging to other families in the area. Berrigan's plan is to get ahold of the properties in order to build a new railroad. When the conflict escalates, Berrigan murders the patriarch of the family, Sebastian Collogero, and in response, his son Marco claims for justice. With the help of his family and some of the citizens Marco starts an open guerrilla war against Berrigan and his hired guns.

== Cast ==
- Eric Roberts as Marco Collogero
- Giancarlo Giannini as Sebastian Collogero
- Dennis Hopper as William Bradford Berrigan
- Burt Young as Andrews
- Carlin Glynn as Miss Jeffreys
- Lara Harris as Angelica
- Joseph Runningfox as Samuel Joseph
- Al Ruscio as Antonio Segestra
- Michael Madsen as Enzio
- Elias Koteas as Silvio
- Francesca De Sapio as Rosa Collogero
- Marc Lawrence as Michael Fazio
- Frank Campanella as Dr. Scola
- Aldo Ray as Father Stassio
- Gary Swanson as Senator Willard Endicott
- Susan Anspach as Widow
- Kevin Cooney as Mayor Riggs
- Julia Roberts as Maria Collogero
- Charles Dierkop as Cooper
