= Katie Sandwina =

Strongwoman (1884–1952)

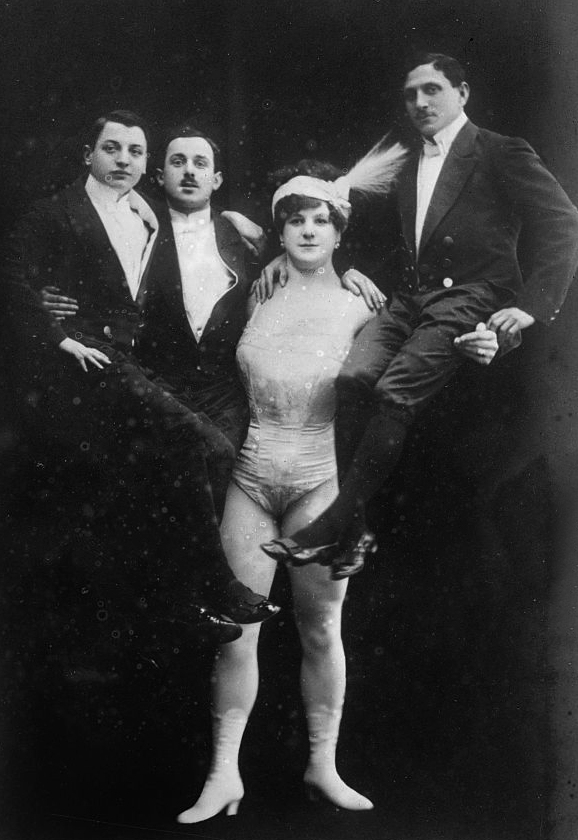
- Born: Katharina Brumbach; 6 May 1884; Essen, Germany
- Died: 21 January 1952 (aged 67); New York City, U.S.
- Height: 6 ft 1 in (1.85 m)
- Spouse: Max Heymann (m. 1910)
- Children: 2, including Alfred Sandwina

Katie Sandwina (born Katharina Brumbach and also known as Katie Brumbach; 1884 – 21 January 1952) was a German-American circus strongwoman.

== Life in the circus ==
Katie Brumbach was one of fourteen children born to circus performers Philippe and Johanna Brumbach. In her early years, Katie performed with her family. Katie's father would offer one hundred marks to any man in the audience who could defeat her in wrestling; no one ever succeeded in winning the prize. It was during one such performance that Katie met her husband of forty-two years, Max Heymann.

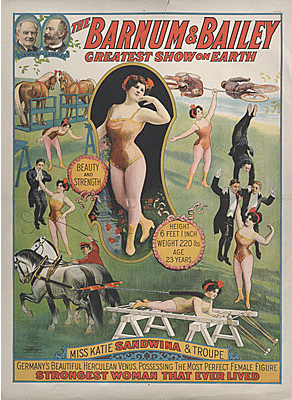
Barnum & Bailey poster from 1914. "Germany's beautiful Herculean Venus possessing the most perfect female figure".

In 1902 Brumbach defeated the famous strongman Eugen Sandow in a weightlifting contest in New York City. Katie lifted a weight of 300 pounds over her head, which Sandow managed to lift only to his chest. After this victory, she adopted the stage name "Sandwina" as a feminine derivative of Sandow.

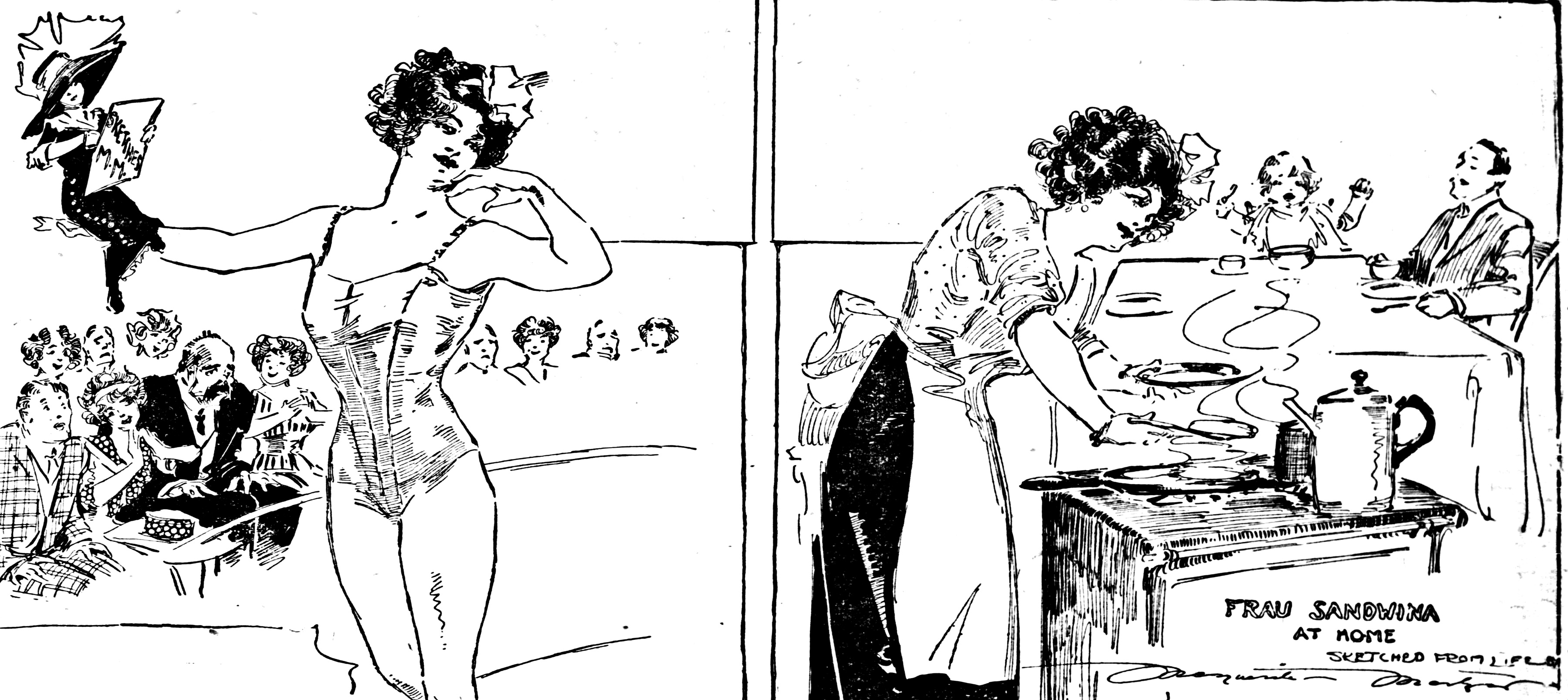
Imaginative sketch by artist-reporter Marguerite Martyn of herself being lifted by Sandwina in front of a circus crowd, left, and a realistic Martyn sketch of Sandwina cooking dinner for her son and husband, right, 1911

Sandwina worked in the United States with Ringling Bros. and Barnum & Bailey Circus for many years, until she was nearly 60. One of her standard performance feats was lifting her husband (who weighed 165 pounds) overhead with one hand. She performed many other feats, such as bending steel bars and resisting the pull of four horses. Sandwina's record of an overhead lift of 296 pounds (129 kg) stood for many years until being eclipsed by women's weightlifter Karyn Marshall in 1987.

Reporter Marguerite Martyn described her act when the circus came to St. Louis, Missouri, in 1911:

At the moment she was twirling her husband about in dizzy circles above her head . . . . Carelessly, laughingly, she tosses her husband about as though he were not flesh and bone, but merely an effigy of inflated rubber. And he is no insignificant husband, either.

== Family ==
The couple had two sons: Theodore Sandwina, born in Sioux City, Iowa, who was a champion heavyweight boxer in the 1920s; and Alfred Sandwina, who was an actor.

== Retirement and death ==
In her later years, Katie and her husband operated a bar and grill restaurant in Ridgewood, Queens, New York. They advertised it as belonging to the world's strongest woman and Katie would occasionally perform minor feats of strength to entertain their patrons, including breaking iron chains, bending iron bars, and using her husband as a human barbell.

Katie Sandwina died of cancer on 21 January 1952.
