= Dance with a Stranger =

- Theatrical release poster
- Directed by: Mike Newell
- Written by: Shelagh Delaney
- Produced by: Roger Randall-Cutler
- Starring: Miranda Richardson; Rupert Everett
- Cinematography: Peter Hannan
- Music by: Richard Hartley theme song by Mari Wilson
- Production company: Goldcrest Films International
- Distributed by: 20th Century Fox
- Release date: 1 March 1985 (UK)
- Running time: 96 minutes
- Country: United Kingdom
- Language: English
- Budget: £1.36 million or £1.5 million
- Box office: £850,000 (UK) $3 million (US) $1 million (other territories)

Dance with a Stranger is a 1985 British film directed by Mike Newell. Telling the story of Ruth Ellis, the last woman to be hanged in Britain (1955), the film won critical acclaim, and aided the careers of two of its leading actors, Miranda Richardson and Rupert Everett. The screenplay was by Shelagh Delaney, author of A Taste of Honey, and was her third major screenplay. The story of Ellis has resonance in Britain because it provided part of the background to the extended national debates that led to the progressive abolition of capital punishment from 1965.

The theme song, a cover version of Peggy Lee's 1951 track "Would You Dance with a Stranger?", was performed by Mari Wilson and released as a single.

== Plot ==
A former nude model and prostitute, Ruth is manager of a drinking club in London that has racing drivers as its main clients. Ruth lives in a flat above the bar with her illegitimate son Andy. Another child is in the custody of her estranged husband's family.

In the club, she meets David, an immature young man from a well-off family who wants to succeed in motor racing but suffers from lack of money and overuse of alcohol. Ruth falls for his looks and charm, but it is a doomed relationship. Without a job, he cannot afford to marry her, and his family would never accept her. When he makes a drunken scene in the club, she is discharged from her job and made homeless.

Desmond, a wealthy admirer, secures a flat for her and her son, but she still sees David. When she tells him she is pregnant, he does nothing about it, and she miscarries. Distraught, she goes to a house in Hampstead where she believes David is at a party. He comes out and goes with a girl to a pub. Ruth waits outside the pub, and when he emerges, she shoots him dead with four shots. She is arrested, tried and hanged.

== Cast ==
- Miranda Richardson as Ruth Ellis
- Rupert Everett as David Blakely
- Ian Holm as Desmond Cussen
- Stratford Johns as Morrie Conley
- Joanne Whalley as Christine
- Tom Chadbon as Anthony Findlater
- Jane Bertish as Carole Findlater
- David Troughton as Cliff Davis
- Tracy Louise Ward as Girl with Blakeley
- Matthew Carroll as Andy
- Lesley Manville as Maryanne
- David Beale as Man in Little Club
- Charon Bourke as Ballroom Singer

== Production ==
The film was developed by producer Roger Randall-Cutler who was inspired to make it after meeting John Bickford, the lawyer who defended Ellis. "The movie is not about a hanging," he said. "It is a love story."

Randall Cutler did not meet with Ellis' son who was in a mental hospital, prior to his suicide in 1982. He talked twice with Desmond Cussen.

Randall Cutler approached Goldcrest Films for finance and they rejected him. However during filming Goldcrest agreed to invest £253,000 in exchange for worldwide distribution rights and 12% equity. The rest of the finance came from Channel Four and the National Film Finance Corporation.

During filming a stage play about Ellis, Breakneck, premiered.

== Reception ==
=== Box office ===
The film was released in the UK in March 1985 and was the most popular film in the country for a week. Guy East of Goldcrest said the company promoted it very heavily prior to its release as it was shortly before the company was taking its slate to American Film Market and wanted the movie to be performing well at that time.

The film made a comfortable profit. Goldcrest Films invested £253,000 in the film and received £361,000, making them a profit of £108,000. Jake Eberts of Goldcrest - who had turned down the movie in 1983 - called it "a very good film" that was "much too small to make any impact on our finances" as the money came in "in dribs and drabs".

=== Critical response ===
Variety wrote "Miranda Richardson’s performance as Ruth Ellis is firstrate. With her rolling eyes and impulsive gestures, she captures the delicate nuances of an attractive girl who’s both cool and coquettish. Major flaw is Rupert Everett’s inability to convey more about David Blakeley than that he’s set to fail consistently in work and life."

On Rotten Tomatoes, the film has an approval rating of 91%, based on reviews from 11 critics.

=== Accolades ===
Mike Newell won Award of the Youth at the 1985 Cannes Film Festival for Dance with a Stranger. Miranda Richardson won Best Actress at the Evening Standard British Film Awards, and Ian Holm won Boston Society of Film Critics Awards 1985 for this and other performances.
