= Dee Hoty =

American actress (born 1952)

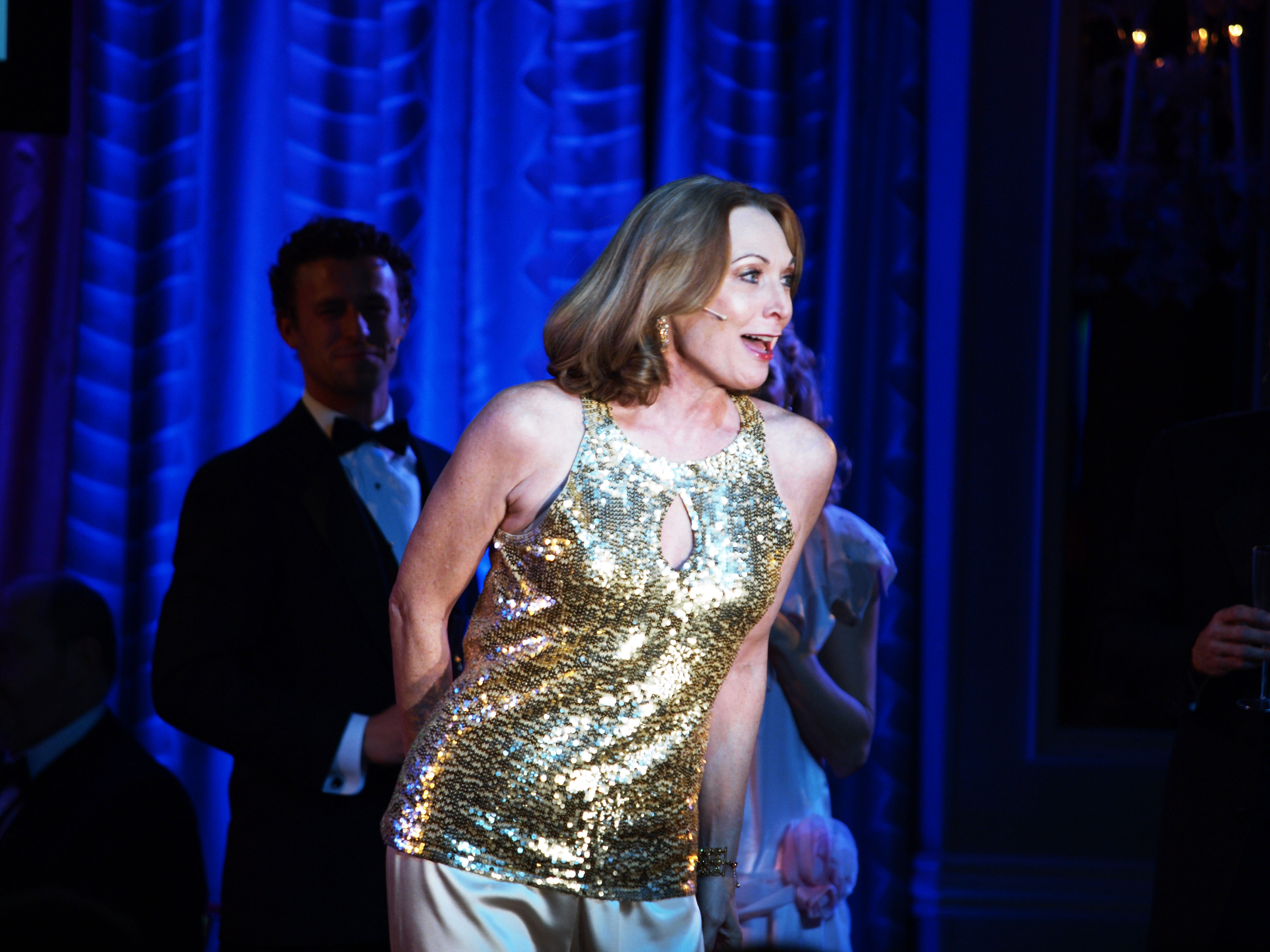
- Hoty in 2010
- Born: Lakewood, Ohio
- Education: Otterbein College
- Occupation: Actress
- Years active: 1976–present

Dee Hoty is an American actress known for her work in musical theatre. Over the course of her career, she has appeared in numerous Broadway productions and earned three Tony Award nominations for Best Actress in a Musical, for The Will Rogers Follies (1991), The Best Little Whorehouse Goes Public (1994), and Footloose (1999).

== Biography ==
A native of Lakewood, Ohio, Hoty grew up in Cleveland, where she was active in her church choir. During high school at Lakewood, she discovered musical theatre and made it her college major at Otterbein College.

Hoty moved to New York City in June 1977 and began to pursue a professional acting career. (Her brother, Tony Hoty was performing in Godspell around that time.) Her Broadway appearances include Shakespeare's Cabaret, The Five O'Clock Girl (Cora Wainwright), Me and My Girl (Jaqueline Carstone), City of Angels (Carla Haywood/Alaura Kingsley), The Will Rogers Follies (Betty Blake), The Best Little Whorehouse Goes Public (Mona Stangley), Footloose (Vi), and Mamma Mia! (Donna).

Of these appearances, she received Tony Award nominations for Footloose!, The Best Little Whorehouse Goes Public and The Will Rogers Follies as Best Actress in a Musical.

She received acclaim for the 1998 Paper Mill Playhouse (Milburn, New Jersey) production of Stephen Sondheim's Follies, playing the role of Phyllis Rogers Stone and recording a well-received cast album The Variety reviewer wrote: "Analyzing her options in 'Could I Leave You?,' Hoty turns the song into a marital slice-and-dice triumph. She is also divinely spicy in a sophisticated striptease, 'Ah, But Underneath.' " She played "Mrs. MacAfee" in the 2009 Roundabout Theatre revival of Bye Bye Birdie, Aunt Alicia in the 2015 Broadway revival of Lerner and Loewe’s Gigi, and Mama Murphy in the 2016 Broadway premiere of the Steve Martin and Edie Brickell musical Bright Star.

She has also appeared in several film and television productions including As the World Turns, Guiding Light, Models Inc., St. Elsewhere, The Equalizer, Spenser: For Hire, Ryan's Hope, Capital, Law & Order, Law & Order: Criminal Intent, Untold West, and Harry and Walter Go to NY.

In 2013, Hoty was inducted into Cleveland Play House's Hall of Fame.

== Theatre ==
Dee Hoty theatre credits
Year	Title	Role	Notes
1981	The Five O'Clock Girl	Cora Wainwright	Broadway
1981	Shakespeare's Cabaret	Dee	Broadway
1981	Barnum	Chairy Barnum	First US National Tour
1981	Ta-Dah!	Performer	Off-Off-Broadway
1985	Personals	Claire	Off-Broadway
1986	Me and My Girl	Lady Jacqueline Carstone	Broadway
1989	City of Angels	Alaura Kingsley; Carla Haywood	Broadway
1991	The Will Rogers Follies	Betty Blake	Broadway
1994	The Best Little Whorehouse Goes Public	Mona Stangley	Broadway
1998	Follies	Phyllis Rogers Stone	Paper Mill Playhouse
1998	Footloose	Vi Moore	Broadway
2003	Mamma Mia!	Donna Sheridan	Broadway; First US National Tour
2006	Doctor Dolittle	Emma Fairfax	US National Tour
2006	The Night of the Hunter	Willa Harper	New York
2009	Love, Loss, and What I Wore	Performer	Off-Broadway
2009	Bye Bye Birdie	Mrs. MacAfee	Broadway
2010	9 to 5: The Musical	Violet Newstead	First US National Tour
2015	Gigi	Aunt Alicia	Kennedy Center; Broadway
2016	Bright Star	Mama Murphy	Broadway

== Filmography ==
=== Film ===
Dee Hoty film credits
Year	Title	Role	Notes
1976	Harry and Walter Go to New York	Beauty no. 2	
1991	Age Isn't Everything	Actress	
2008	The Understudy	Diane Kinsman	

=== Television ===
Dee Hoty television credits
Year	Title	Role	Notes
1983	An Uncommon Love	Martha Lowrie	TV movie
1984	St. Elsewhere	Dr. Patricia Meldrum	2 episodes
1985	It's Your Move	Terry	Episode: "A Woman Is Just a Woman"
1985	The Equalizer	Hostess	Episode: "The Distant Fire"
1986	Spenser: For Hire	Sarah Brown	Episode: "One If by Land, Two If by Sea"
1991	Hi Honey, I'm Home!	Elaine Duff	Episode: "Pilot"
1991	The Will Rogers Follies	Betty Blake	TV movie
1991	As the World Turns	Karen Martell	Episodes from 1991 to 1992
1994	Models Inc.	Gretchen	Episode: "Ultimatums Are Us"
2006	Law & Order: Criminal Intent	Mrs. Stevens	Episode: "Blasters"
2008	Law & Order	Judge H. Kifner	2 episodes
2012	Elementary	Patsy	Episode: "The Leviathan"
2013	Smash	Director	Episode: "The Nominations"
2014	Back to Reality	Dr. Shruvnitz	Episode: "The Way of the Future"
2017	Nunsense	Sr. Mary Wilhelm	Spin-off of the stage musical
