= Full Moon in Blue Water =

1988 film by Peter Masterson

- Theatrical release poster
- Directed by: Peter Masterson
- Written by: Bill Bozzone
- Produced by: David Foster; John Turman; Lawrence Turman
- Starring: Gene Hackman; Teri Garr; Burgess Meredith; Elias Koteas
- Cinematography: Fred Murphy
- Edited by: Jill Savitt
- Music by: Phil Marshall
- Production companies: Trans World Entertainment; Turman-Foster Company
- Distributed by: Trans World Entertainment
- Release dates: May 1988 (Cannes); November 23, 1988
- Running time: 95 mins.
- Country: United States
- Language: English
- Budget: $8 million
- Box office: $450,726 (USA)

Full Moon in Blue Water is a 1988 American romantic comedy film directed by Peter Masterson and starring Gene Hackman, Teri Garr and Burgess Meredith. It received negative reviews from critics.

== Plot ==
Floyd owns a bar called the Blue Water Grill in a town of that name on an island off the gulf coast of Texas. He has lost interest in almost everything in the year since the mysterious disappearance of his wife, neglecting his business and staying home to watch old home movies of their life.

Floyd's father-in-law, known to all as the General, uses a wheelchair and is trapped in the throes of dementia. An intellectually disabled local man called Jimmy comes by to look after the General at times when Floyd can't be there.

Into their lives comes Louise, a school bus driver who is falling for Floyd and trying to get him to come out of his stupor. Land opportunists are trying to seize his property and taxes need to be paid. With the troubles piling up, Floyd is eventually forced to confront his future.

== Cast ==
- Gene Hackman as Floyd
- Teri Garr as Louise Taylor
- Burgess Meredith as The General
- Elias Koteas as Jimmy
- Kevin Cooney as Charlie O'Donnell
- David Doty as Virgil
- Gil Glasgow as Baytch
- Becky Gelke as Dorothy
- Marietta Marich as Lois
- Lexie Masterson as Annie Gorman
- Mark Walters as Johnny Gorman
- Ben Jones as Digby
- Tiny Skaggs as Stranger #1
- Bill Johnson as Stranger #2

== Production ==
Filmed in Seabrook, Texas.

== Release ==
The film was screened at the 1988 Cannes Film Festival in May 1988.

== Reception ==
On the review aggregator website Rotten Tomatoes, 25% of 12 critics' reviews are positive, with an average rating of 4.2/10.
