= The Trip to Bountiful =

1985 American film by Peter Masterson

- Directed by: Peter Masterson
- Screenplay by: Horton Foote
- Based on: The Trip to Bountiful; 1953 play by Horton Foote
- Produced by: Horton Foote; Sterling Van Wagenen
- Starring: Geraldine Page; John Heard; Carlin Glynn; Richard Bradford; Rebecca De Mornay
- Cinematography: Fred Murphy
- Edited by: Jay Freund
- Music by: J.A.C. Redford
- Production companies: Bountiful Film Partners; FilmDallas Pictures
- Distributed by: Island Pictures
- Release date: December 20, 1985
- Running time: 108 minutes
- Country: United States
- Language: English
- Box office: $7,491,903

The Trip to Bountiful is a 1985 American road drama film directed by Peter Masterson and starring Geraldine Page, John Heard, Carlin Glynn, Richard Bradford and Rebecca De Mornay. It was adapted by Horton Foote from his 1953 play. The film features a soundtrack by J.A.C. Redford featuring Will Thompson's "Softly and Tenderly" sung by Cynthia Clawson. Geraldine Page won the Academy Award for Best Actress for her performance as Mrs. Watts and Horton Foote was nominated for the Academy Award for Best Adapted Screenplay.

The film is partially set in the community of Bountiful, a fictitious Texas town. Although part of the film is set in Houston (as was the original play), the movie was shot in Dallas.

== Plot ==
The film, set in the post-World War II 1940s, tells the story of an elderly woman, Carrie Watts, who wants to return to her home, the small, rural, agriculture-based town of Bountiful near the Texas Gulf coast between Houston and Corpus Christi, where she grew up, but she's frequently stopped from leaving Houston by her daughter-in-law and her overprotective son, who will not let her travel alone. Her son and daughter-in-law both know that the town has long since disappeared due to the Depression. Long-term out-migration was caused by the draw-down of all the town's able-bodied men to the wartime draft calls and by the demand for industrial workers in the war production plants of the big cities.

Old Mrs. Watts is determined to outwit her son and bossy daughter-in-law, and sets out to catch a train, only to find that trains no longer go to Bountiful. She eventually boards a bus to a town near her childhood home. On the journey, she befriends a woman traveling alone and reminisces about her younger years and grieves for her lost relatives. Her son and daughter-in-law eventually track her down, with the help of the local police force; however, Mrs. Watts is determined. The local sheriff, moved by her yearning to visit her girlhood home, offers to drive her out to what remains of Bountiful. The town is deserted and the few remaining structures are derelict. Mrs. Watts learns that the last occupant of the town and the woman with whom she had hoped to live, has recently died. She is moved to tears as she surveys her father's land and the remains of the family home. Having accepted the reality of the current condition of Bountiful and knowing that she has reached her goal of returning there before dying, she is ready to return to Houston when her son and daughter-in-law arrive to drive her back. Having confronted their common history in Bountiful, the three commit to live more peacefully together. They begin their drive back to Houston.

== Cast ==
- Geraldine Page as Mrs. Watts
- John Heard as Ludie Watts
- Carlin Glynn as Jessie Mae
- Richard Bradford as Sheriff
- Rebecca De Mornay as Thelma
- Kevin Cooney as Roy
- Norman Bennett as First Bus Ticket Man
- Harvey Lewis as Second Bus Ticket Man
- Kirk Sisco as Train Ticket Agent
- Gil Glasgow as Stationmaster, Gerard
- Mary Kay Mars as Rosella
- Wezz Tildon as Bus Passenger
- Peggy Ann Byers as Downstairs Neighbor
- David Romo as Mexican Man
- Tony Torn as Twin
- John Torn as Twin
- Alexandra Masterson as Drugstore Waitress
- Don Wyse as Doctor

== Reception ==
=== Critical response ===
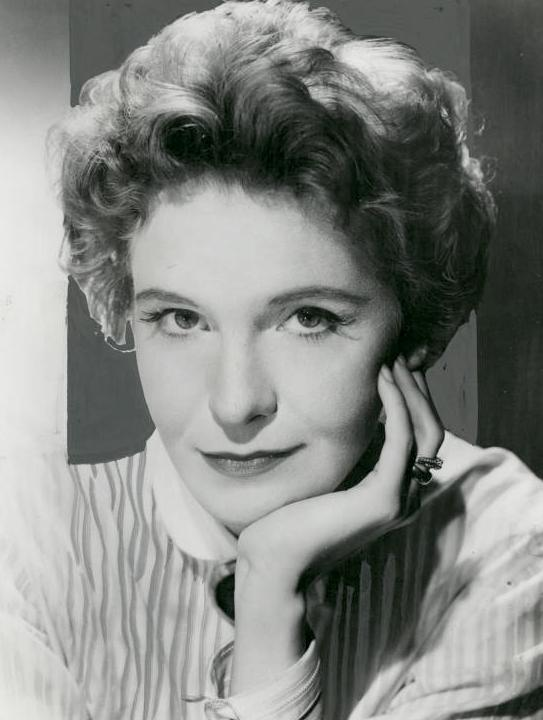
Geraldine Page's performance received positive reviews, earning her the Academy Award for Best Actress.

The Trip to Bountiful received a very positive response from film critics. On Rotten Tomatoes, it has a score of 100% from 10 reviews, with an average rating of 7.3/10. Geraldine Page received particular praise for her performance as Mrs. Watts. Variety called the film "a superbly crafted drama featuring the performance of a lifetime by Geraldine Page." Vincent Canby of The New York Times described it as a "funny, exquisitely performed film adaptation of [Foote's] own play" and wrote of Page, "Her Mrs. Watts is simultaneously hilarious and crafty, sentimental and unexpectedly tough." He added, "It's a wonderful role, and the performance ranks with the best things Miss Page has done on the screen."

Roger Ebert of the Chicago Sun-Times similarly observed that "Page inhabits the central role with authority and vinegar," writing, "She's not just a sweet and gentle little old lady. She's a big old lady, with a streak of stubbornness. And just because she's right doesn't mean she's always all that nice." Charles Champlin of the Los Angeles Times further remarked, "Carrie [Watts] is a performance, a precisely conceived and calculated turn by a gifted professional always aware of what she is doing and the effects she's creating. But the test of acting always is that you forget this, surrendering to the certainty that you have been transported back to 1947 and that dark apartment, and are then riding the bus toward Bountiful in the company of this warm and loving old woman. The film gives us an unforgettable portrayal."

Vincent Canby later included The Trip to Bountiful in his list of the top ten films of 1985. The Japanese filmmaker Akira Kurosawa cited The Trip to Bountiful as one of his favorite films.

=== Awards and nominations ===
Award	Category	Recipients and nominees	Result
Academy Awards	Best Actress	Geraldine Page	Won
Academy Awards	Best Screenplay – Based on Material from Another Medium	Horton Foote	Nominated
Boston Society of Film Critics Awards	Best Actress	Geraldine Page	Won
Golden Globe Awards	Best Actress in a Motion Picture – Drama	Geraldine Page	Nominated
Independent Spirit Awards	Best Film	Sterling Van Wagenen and Horton Foote	Nominated
Independent Spirit Awards	Best Director	Peter Masterson	Nominated
Independent Spirit Awards	Best Female Lead	Geraldine Page	Won
Independent Spirit Awards	Best Screenplay	Horton Foote	Won
Mainichi Film Awards	Best Foreign Language Film	Peter Masterson	Won
National Board of Review Awards	Top Ten Films		3rd Place
New York Film Critics Circle Awards	Best Actress	Geraldine Page	3rd Place
Retirement Research Foundation, USA	Television and Theatrical Film Fiction	Horton Foote and Sterling Van Wagenen	Won
Writers Guild of America Awards	Best Screenplay – Based on Material from Another Medium	Horton Foote	Nominated

== Home media ==
On April 12, 2005, MGM released The Trip to Bountiful on DVD in region 1 US in both a widescreen and a full-frame format on a two-sided disc.

In the United Kingdom, the film was initially released in late 1986 on VHS via Vestron Video, while it has been available multiple times on DVD on region 2 in the UK; first distributed by Arrow Films in a standard full-frame format edition on February 7, 2005, while on February 6, 2006, it was made available via Prism in the same full-frame version. Its most recent DVD release was on December 15, 2008, when it was distributed by Boulevard Entertainment.

Kino Lorber released The Trip to Bountiful on Blu-ray Region A on September 25, 2018.
