= Lost Junction =

2003 film by Peter Masterson

- Release poster
- Directed by: Peter Masterson
- Written by: Jeff Cole
- Produced by: Daniel Bigel; Michael Mailer
- Starring: Neve Campbell; Billy Burke; Jake Busey
- Cinematography: Thomas Burstyn
- Edited by: Peter C. Frank
- Music by: Normand Corbeil
- Production company: Bigel / Mailer Films
- Release date: 2003
- Running time: 95 minutes
- Country: United States
- Language: English

Lost Junction is a 2003 thriller film directed by Peter Masterson, written by Jeff Cole and shot in Montreal.

== Plot ==
A hitchhiking drifter (Billy Burke) has his life irrevocably changed when he meets a seductive young woman (Neve Campbell) who lures him into disposing of the body of her husband.

== Cast ==
- Neve Campbell as Missy Lofton
- Billy Burke as Jimmy McGee
- Jake Busey as Matt
- Charles Powell as Porter
- David Gow as Sheriff Frank
- Michel Perron as Shorty
- Amy Sloan as Teller
- Norman Mikeal Berketa as Mr. Thompson
- Mariah Inger as Cassie

== Home media ==
The region 1 DVD was released November 9, 2004.
