= The Best Little Whorehouse in Texas =

Musical play

- Original cast album
- Music: Carol Hall
- Lyrics: Carol Hall
- Book: Larry L. King; Peter Masterson
- Basis: Story by Larry L. King
- Productions: 1978 Broadway; 1980 U.S. Tour; 1980 Sydney; 1981 West End; 1982 Broadway Revival; 1982 Film; 2001 U.S. Tour; 2011 London Fringe Revival

The Best Little Whorehouse in Texas is a musical with a book by Texas author Larry L. King and Peter Masterson and music and lyrics by Carol Hall. It is based on King’s 1974 Playboy article “The Best Little Whorehouse in Texas”, on the closure of the Chicken Ranch in La Grange, Texas.

== Production history ==
The Best Little Whorehouse in Texas opened off-Broadway at the Entermedia Theatre on April 17, 1978. It reopened on Broadway at the 46th Street Theatre on June 19, 1978, and ran for 1,584 performances until March 27, 1982. The production was directed by Peter Masterson and Tommy Tune and choreographed by Tune and Thommie Walsh. The opening cast included Carlin Glynn, Henderson Forsythe, Jay Garner, Joan Ellis, Delores Hall, and Pamela Blair. Glynn was replaced by Fannie Flagg and Anita Morris later in the run.

Alexis Smith starred as Miss Mona in the first U.S. National Tour, from September 1979 through February 1981, with stops in major cities from Boston to Los Angeles.

The Sydney production opened at Her Majesty's Theatre on 13 September 1980. Produced by J. C. Williamson Ltd, it starred Lorraine Bayly as Miss Mona and Alfred Sandor as Sherriff Ed Earl Dodd, with Mona Richardson as Jewel, Judi Connelli as Doatsy Mae and Peter Whitford as the Governor.

The West End production opened at the Theatre Royal, Drury Lane on February 26, 1981. Produced by Bernard Delfont, it again starred Carlin Glynn and Henderson Forsythe, with Miquel Brown as Jewel and Betsy Brantley as Angel. It included Sally Ann Triplett and Robert Meadmore and ran for 204 performances.

A "summer stock" production that toured the northeastern U.S. in 1982 starred Barbara Eden, William Hardy and Jay Garner.

In what was described as "a return engagement", the show opened on Broadway at the Eugene O'Neill Theatre on May 31, 1982, and closed on July 24, 1982, after nine previews and 63 performances. The cast featured Carlin Glynn and Delores Hall.

A short-lived sequel entitled The Best Little Whorehouse Goes Public was staged on Broadway in 1994.

"The Aggie Song" was performed on the Tony Awards broadcast, but was heavily censored because of the nature of the lyrics and choreography.

A U.S. National Tour starring Ann-Margret opened on February 14, 2001.

A benefit concert took place on October 16, 2006, to benefit the Actor's Fund. The concert was directed by Mark S. Hoebee and choreographed by Denis Jones. The cast included Terrence Mann (as Sheriff Ed Earl Dodd), Emily Skinner, and Jennifer Hudson.

== Synopsis ==
It is the late 1970s, and a brothel has been operating outside of fictional Gilbert, Texas (based on La Grange) for more than a century. It is currently under the proprietorship of Miss Mona Stangley, who inherited it from original owner Miss Wulla Jean. While caring for her girls, she is also on good terms with local sheriff Ed Earl Dodd, and donates to the greater community. When crusading television reporter Melvin P. Thorpe (based on real-life Houston news personality Marvin Zindler) decides to publicize the illegal activity, the ensuing political ramifications eventually cause the business to be closed down.

== Principal casts ==
Character	Broadway (1978)	West End (1981)	Broadway Revival (1982)	Tour (2001)	The Actors Fund (2006)
Mona Stangley	Carlin Glynn	Carlin Glynn	Carlin Glynn	Ann-Margret	Emily Skinner
Sheriff Ed Earl Dodd	Henderson Forsythe	Henderson Forsythe	Gil Rogers	Gary Sandy	Terrence Mann
Jewel	Delores Hall	Miquel Brown	Delores Hall	Avery Sommers	Jennifer Hudson
Melvin P. Thorpe	Clinton Allmon	Nigel Pegram	Clinton Allmon	Rob Donohoe	Bob Martin
The Governor	Jay Garner	Fred Evans	Patrick Hamilton	Ed Dixon	Harry Groener
Angel	Pamela Blair	Betsy Brantley	Susann Fletcher	Terri Dixon	Felicia Finley
Shy	Joan Ellis	Natalie Forbes	Cheryl Ebarb	Jen Celene Little	Mary Faber
Doatsey Mae	Susan Mansur	Sheila Brand	Becky Gelke	Roxie Lucas	Andrea McArdle
C.J. Scruggs	Jay Garner	Bob Sessions	Patrick Hamilton	Ed Dixon	Bob Amaral
Mayor Rufus Poindexter	J. Frank Lucas	Gordon Sterne	J. Frank Lucas	Matt Landers	Richard Poe
Senator Wingwoah	J. Frank Lucas	Gordon Sterne	J. Frank Lucas	Matt Landers	Richard Kind

== Song list ==
Act I

- "Prologue" – The Rio Grande Band Leader and the Rio Grande Band
- "20 Fans" – Company
- "A Lil' Ole Bitty Pissant Country Place" – Mona and the Girls
- "Girl, You're a Woman" – Mona, Shy, Jewel and the Girls
- "Watch Dog Theme" – The Dogettes
- "Texas Has a Whorehouse in It" – Thorpe, the Thorpe Singers and the Dogettes
- "Twenty Four Hours of Lovin'" – Jewel and the Girls
- "Watch Dog Theme" (Reprise) – The Dogettes
- "Texas Has a Whorehouse in It" (Reprise) – Thorpe and the Dogettes
- "Doatsy Mae" – Doatsy Mae
- "Angelette March" – Angelette Imogene Charlene and the Angelettes
- "The Aggie Song" – The Aggies
- "The Bus from Amarillo" – Mona

Act II

- "The Sidestep" – The Governor and Company
- "No Lies" – Mona, Jewel and the Girls
- "Good Old Girl" – Dodd and the Aggies
- "Hard Candy Christmas" – The Girls
- "A Friend to Me" † – Mona
- "Finale" – Company

"The Bus from Amarillo" was moved to the final scene, sometime late in the run of the original production and has generally played that way ever since.

† was added in the 2001 production.

== Awards and nominations ==
=== Original Broadway production ===
Year	Award	Category	Nominee	Result
1979	Tony Award	Best Musical		Nominated
1979	Tony Award	Best Book of a Musical	Larry L. King and Peter Masterson	Nominated
1979	Tony Award	Best Performance by a Featured Actor in a Musical	Henderson Forsythe	Won
1979	Tony Award	Best Performance by a Featured Actress in a Musical	Carlin Glynn	Won
1979	Tony Award	Best Performance by a Featured Actress in a Musical	Joan Ellis	Nominated
1979	Tony Award	Best Direction of a Musical	Peter Masterson and Tommy Tune	Nominated
1979	Tony Award	Best Choreography	Tommy Tune and Thommie Walsh	Nominated
1979	Drama Desk Award	Outstanding Musical		Nominated
1979	Drama Desk Award	Outstanding Actor in a Musical	Henderson Forsythe	Nominated
1979	Drama Desk Award	Outstanding Actress in a Musical	Carlin Glynn	Nominated
1979	Drama Desk Award	Outstanding Featured Actress in a Musical	Pamela Blair	Nominated
1979	Drama Desk Award	Outstanding Director of a Musical	Peter Masterson and Tommy Tune	Won
1979	Drama Desk Award	Outstanding Choreography	Tommy Tune and Thommie Walsh	Nominated
1979	Drama Desk Award	Outstanding Lyrics	Carol Hall	Won
1979	Drama Desk Award	Outstanding Music	Carol Hall	Won
1979	Theatre World Award		Carlin Glynn	Won

== Discography ==
- The Best Little Whorehouse in Texas: original cast. LP with gatefold jacket. MCA, 1978. MCA-3049. Cassette as MCAC-3049.
- The Best Little Whorehouse in Texas: original cast. Audio CD. MCA, 1997. MCAD-11683; MCA-3049.
- Best Little Whorehouse in Texas: New cast recording. Audio CD. Fynsworth Alley/Varèse Sarabande, 2001. 302 062 117 2.

== Film adaptation ==
The musical was adapted into a film of the same name, which was released by Universal Pictures in July 1982. The film was directed by Colin Higgins, with a screenplay by Higgins, King, and Masterson. It stars Dolly Parton as Miss Mona, Burt Reynolds as Ed Earl, Dom DeLuise as Thorpe, and Charles Durning as the Governor.

The film makes several significant changes to the original play, changing Mona and Ed Earl's one-night stand to an ongoing affair, and shifting the story's focus to their relationship. Consequently, several characters like Jewel and Doatsy Mae are excised. Eight songs from the original play were cut, while two new songs by Parton — "Sneakin' Around" and "I Will Always Love You" (first recorded in 1974) — were added.

== Bibliography ==
- Hall, Carol. Vocal selections from The Best Little Whorehouse in Texas. Melville, N.Y.: MCA Music, 1979.
- King, Larry L., and Masterson, Peter. The Best Little Whorehouse in Texas. Music and lyrics by Carol Hall. French's Musical Library. New York, N.Y.: S. French, 1978. ISBN 0-573-68111-2.
- King, Larry L. The Whorehouse Papers. New York: Viking Press, 1982. ISBN 0-670-15919-0.
