= Convicts (film) =

- DVD cover
- Directed by: Peter Masterson
- Written by: Horton Foote
- Based on: 1977 play Convicts by Horton Foote
- Starring: Robert Duvall; Lukas Haas; James Earl Jones
- Distributed by: M.C.E.G.
- Release date: December 6, 1991
- Running time: 93 minutes
- Country: United States
- Language: English
- Box office: $13,623

Convicts is a 1991 film directed by Peter Masterson. It stars Robert Duvall and Lukas Haas. It is based on the Horton Foote 1977 play Convicts which is part of The Orphans' Home Cycle.

== Summary ==
A boy works with convicts on the sugarcane plantation of a senile Civil War veteran in 1902 Texas.

== Cast ==
- Robert Duvall as Soll Gautier
- Lukas Haas as Horace Robedaux
- James Earl Jones as Ben Johnson
- Starletta DuPois as Martha Johnson
- Carlin Glynn as Asa Vaughn
- Gary Swanson as Billy Vaughn
- Mel Winkler as Jackson Hall
- Calvin Levels as Leroy Kendricks
- Lance E. Nichols as Sherman Edwards
- Carol Sutton as Lena
- Tony Frank as the Sheriff
