= Peter Masterson =

American actor, director, and writer (1934-2018)

- Born: Carlos Bee Masterson Jr. June 1, 1934; Houston, Texas, U.S.
- Died: December 18, 2018 (aged 84); Kinderhook, New York, U.S.
- Other names: Pete Masterson
- Occupations: Actor; director; producer; writer
- Years active: 1965–2005
- Spouse: Carlin Glynn (m. 1960)
- Children: 3, including Mary Stuart Masterson

Peter Masterson (born Carlos Bee Masterson Jr.; June 1, 1934 – December 18, 2018) was an American actor, director, producer, and writer. He made his Broadway debut in November 1967 in The Trial of Lee Harvey Oswald, playing the title character. Although he got good notices, the play closed after nine performances.

== Life and career ==
Masterson often worked with his cousin, writer Horton Foote. Acting from the mid-1960s to the mid-1980s, including 1975's The Stepford Wives as Walter Eberhart, since then he concentrated mostly on directing and producing. Actress Mary Stuart Masterson is his daughter; she appeared with her father in The Stepford Wives, playing one of his daughters. His other acting credits include roles in Ambush Bay (1966), In the Heat of the Night (1967), Counterpoint (1968), Von Richthofen and Brown (1971), Tomorrow (1972), The Exorcist (1973), Man on a Swing (1974), and Gardens of Stone (1987).

Masterson co-wrote (with Larry L. King) the books for the hit musical The Best Little Whorehouse in Texas (1978) and its short-lived sequel The Best Little Whorehouse Goes Public (1994). In 1980, he produced the ABC television movie, City in Fear based on an idea by screenwriter William Goldman, an idea that became the well-reviewed 1979 novel Panic on Page One by Linda Stewart, and the television script by Albert Ruben. The cast was led by Robert Vaughn and David Janssen in his final role before his death. In 1985, he directed The Trip to Bountiful, for which Geraldine Page won the Academy Award for Best Actress. The film also featured his wife, Carlin Glynn, who had previously won a Tony Award for her role in Whorehouse. His directing credits additionally include Full Moon in Blue Water (1988), Night Game (1989), Blood Red (1989), Convicts (1991), Arctic Blue (1993), The Only Thrill (1997), Lost Junction (2003), and Whiskey School (2005).

== Illness and death ==
Masterson died at the age of 84 on December 18, 2018, after suffering a fall at his home. He had received a diagnosis of Parkinson's disease 14 years earlier.

== Filmography ==
=== Film ===
Writer

- The Best Little Whorehouse in Texas (1982)

Director

- The Trip to Bountiful (1985)
- Full Moon in Blue Water (1988)
- Blood Red (1989)
- Night Game (1989)
- Convicts (1991)
- Arctic Blue (1993)
- The Only Thrill (1997) (Also executive producer)
- Terra Nova (1998) (Also producer)
- Lost Junction (2003)
- Whiskey School (2005)

Acting roles

Year	Title	Role	Notes
1966	Ambush Bay	Sgt. William Maccone	
1967	In the Heat of the Night	Fryer	
1968	Counterpoint	Sergeant Calloway	
1971	Von Richthofen and Brown	Major Oswald Boelke	
1972	Tomorrow	Douglas	
1973	The Exorcist	Dr. Barringer	
1974	Man on a Swing	Willie Younger	
1975	The Stepford Wives	Walter Eberhart	
1985	Witchfire		
1987	Gardens of Stone	Col. Feld	
1989	Coyote Mountain	Deputy Sheriff	Short film

=== Television ===
TV movies

Year	Title	Director	Writer	Executive Producer
1980	City in Fear	No	Yes	Yes
1996	Lily Dale	Yes	No	No
2000	Mermaid	Yes	No	No

Acting roles

Year	Title	Role	Notes
1966	Bob Hope Presents the Chrysler Theatre	Tom	1 episode
1966	Death Valley Days	Jimmy	1 episode
1968	N.Y.P.D.	The Man	1 episode
1972	McMillan & Wife	Joey	1 episode
1973	Pueblo	ENC M.O. Goldman	TV movie
1977	The Andros Targets	Bill Lockhart	1 episode
1977	Delta County, U.S.A.	Billy Wingate	TV movie
1977	The Quinns	Michael Quinn	TV movie
1977	Ryan's Hope	Charlie Dean	2 episodes
1977	The Storyteller	Lee Gardner	TV movie
1978	A Question of Guilt	Lieutenant Tom Wharton	TV movie
1982	Texas	Tom Brandon	3 episodes
