= Golden Boy =

Golden Boy or The Golden Boy may refer to:

== Artwork ==
- Golden Boy (Anikushin), a 1975 sculpture by Mikhail Anikushin
- Golden Boy (AT&T) or Spirit of Communication, a 1914 statue and symbol of AT&T
- Golden Boy (Manitoba), a 1918 statue on the dome of the Manitoba Legislative Building
- The Golden Boy of Pye Corner, a 17th-century sculpture in London
- Golden Boy or Standing Shiva (?), an ancient Khmer sculpture repatriated to Thailand from the Metropolitan Museum of Art

== Books and comics ==
- Golden Boy (manga), a 1992 Japanese manga series by Tatsuya Egawa, later adapted into a 1995 anime
- Golden Boy (novel), a 2013 novel by Abigail Tarttelin
- Golden Boy (DC Comics), a fictional character in the DC Comics Universe
- Sandy Hawkins, or Sandy the Golden Boy, a character in the DC Comics Universe

== Film, theatre, and television ==
- Golden Boy (1925 film), a German silent film
- Golden Boy (play), a 1937 play by Clifford Odets
  - Golden Boy (1939 film), a film adaptation of Odets' play
  - Golden Boy (musical), a 1964 musical version of Odets' play
- "Golden Boy", a T-shirt in the 1994 Seinfeld episode "The Marine Biologist"
- Golden Boy (American TV series), a 2013 crime drama
- A Golden Boy, a 2014 Italian film
- Golden Boy (New Zealand TV series), a 2019 comedy series
- Golden Boy (South Korean TV series), a 2024 romantic comedy series
- "Golden Boy", a 2007/2008 episode of All Grown Up!
- "Golden Boy", an episode of Power Rangers: Dino Thunder
- Yalı Çapkını, a 2022 Turkish drama series

== Music ==
- Golden Boy (electronic musician) (born 1968), musician/artist who played with Miss Kittin

=== Albums ===
- Golden Boy (Art Blakey album), 1963
- Golden Boy (Quincy Jones album), or the title song, 1964
- Golden Boy (Sin with Sebastian album), or the title song (see below), 1995
- Golden Boy, by Kojo Funds

=== Songs ===
- "Golden Boy" (Kylie Minogue song), 2014
- "Golden Boy" (Nadav Guedj song), 2015
- "Golden Boy" (Sin with Sebastian song), 1995
- "The Golden Boy", by Freddie Mercury and Montserrat Caballé, 1988
- "Golden Boy", by Godley & Creme from The History Mix Volume 1, 1985
- "Golden Boy," by Greg Dulli from Amber Headlights, 2005
- "Golden Boy", by the Mountain Goats from Ghana, 1999
- "Golden Boy", by Natalie Merchant from Motherland, 2001
- "Golden Boy", by Primus from Brown Album, 1997
- "Golden Boy", written by Sam Spence

== People with the nickname ==
- Ivor Allchurch (1929–1997), Welsh football player
- Oscar De La Hoya (born 1973), boxer
- Badr Hari (born 1984), Moroccan-Dutch K-1 kickboxer
- Stephen Hendry (born 1969), Scottish professional snooker player
- Paul Hornung (1935–2020), American football player
- Donny Lalonde (born 1960), retired boxer
- Fred Lorenzen (born 1934), NASCAR driver
- Wilf Mannion (1918–2000), England and Middlesbrough F. C. footballer 1930s to 1950s
- Diego Maradona (1960–2020), Argentine footballer
- Gianni Rivera (born 1943), Italian footballer, 1969 European Footballer of the Year (Ballon D'Or)
- Arnold Skaaland (1925–2007), American former professional wrestler and professional wrestling manager
- Francesco Totti (born 1976), Italian footballer

== Other uses ==
- Golden Boy (award), a European football award
- Golden Boy Promotions, a boxing and martial arts promotion company founded by Oscar De La Hoya
- Golden Boy, a rimfire rifle from Henry Repeating Arms

== See also ==
- Golden Girl (disambiguation)
- Golden Boys (disambiguation)
- Bangaru Babu (disambiguation), Indian films so titled
