= Kintaro =

Kintaro may refer to:

- Kintarō (金太郎, often translated as "Golden Boy"), legendary child, a folk hero from Japanese folklore; a fictionalized version of Sakata no Kintoki, samurai from the Heian period
- Kintarō doll, a toy offered to Japanese children during the Tango no Sekku holiday
- Kintarō-ame, a traditional candy with a cylinder shape still produced in Japan and coming from the Edo period
- Kintaro (Mortal Kombat), a character in the Mortal Kombat fighting game franchise
- Kintarō Hattori (1860–1934), founder of the Seiko company
- Kintarō Okamura (1867–1935), a Japanese botanist
- Kintaros, a bear Imagin in Kamen Rider Den-O
- Kintaro Oe, the main character from Golden Boy (manga)

== See also ==
- Golden Boy (disambiguation)
