= Golden Girl =

Golden Girl, Goldengirl, or Golden Girls may refer to:

== Film and television ==
=== Film ===
- Golden Girl (film), a 1951 musical
- The Golden Girls (film), a 1995 Hong Kong film
- Goldengirl, a 1979 film

=== TV ===
- The Golden Girls, a television series that aired from 1985 to 1992
- "Golden Girl" (Doctors), a 2004 television episode

=== Other ===
- Golden Girl Film, an Austrian production company, co-producer of Perla (2025)

== Literature and theatre ==
- Golden Girl (Timely Comics), either of two fictional characters from Marvel/Timely Comics
- Golden Girl and Other Stories, a 1994 anthology by Gillian Chan
- The Golden Girls (play), a 1950s play set in Sydney, Australia
- Golden Girls (play), a 1984 play written by Louise Page

== People ==
=== Performers ===
- Golden Girls (girl group), a South Korean musical group
- Paulina Rubio (born 1971), Mexican singer known as the Golden Girl (La Chica Dorada)

=== Baton twirlers ===
- The University of Iowa's Golden Girl, who performs with the Hawkeye marching band
- Purdue University's Golden Girl, who performs with the Purdue All-American Marching Band
- The Mizzou Golden Girls, the official dance team of the University of Missouri

==== Teams ====
- The Golden Girls, nickname of the Vietnam women's national football team
- Golden Girls (gymnastics), the team name chosen for the 2024 U.S. women's Olympic artistic gymnastics team
- Golden Girls of Bulgaria, a group of Bulgarian rhythmic gymnasts who enjoyed success in the 1980s

==== Individuals ====
- Betty Cuthbert (1938–2017), Australian athlete known as the Golden Girl
- Trina Gulliver (born 1969), Ten-time Women's World Professional Darts Champion
- Stephanie Jaramillo (born 1982), professional boxer nicknamed the Golden Girl
- Monique Jones (born 1979), American professional female bodybuilder

== Other uses ==
- "End" / "Golden Girl", a song appearing on CD editions of Frank Ocean's 2012 album Channel Orange
- Golden Girl (award), a European football award
- Golden Girl and the Guardians of the Gemstones, a 1980s toyline by Galoob
- Golden Girls, a musical collaboration between Orbital's Paul Hartnoll and Michael Hazell

== See also ==
- Golden Boy (disambiguation)
