= U.S. Cellular =

American telecommunications company

Array Digital Infrastructure
- Final logo as UScellular; T-Mobile retained the logo through the transition of wireless operations. Logo history 1983–1999 1999–2020 2020–present
- Trade name: Array Digital Infrastructure
- Formerly: United States Cellular Corporation
- Type: Public
- Traded as: NYSE: AD (Common stock); Russell 2000 component
- Industry: Telecommunications
- Founded: 1983; 43 years ago
- Founder: LeRoy Carlson
- Defunct: August 1, 2025; 14 months ago (as UScellular)
- Fate: Wireless operations acquired by T-Mobile US, with its spectrum holdings business renamed to Array Digital Infrastructure
- Headquarters: Chicago, Illinois, U.S.
- Revenue: ▲US$163 million (2025)
- Net income: ▲US$48.8 million (2025)
- Number of employees: 4,800 (1Q 2023)
- Website: arrayinc.com (Current entity) uscellular.com (T-Mobile subsidiary, redirects to t-mobile.com)

Array Digital Infrastructure (Formerly known as United States Cellular Corporation or UScellular) is an American shared wireless communications infrastructure manager and former mobile network operator. As UScellular, its stock was publicly traded, but Telephone and Data Systems Inc. owned a controlling stake (83% economic and 96% voting power). The company was formed in 1983 and was headquartered in Chicago, Illinois. UScellular was the fifth largest wireless carrier in the United States, with 4.4 million subscribers in 21 states as of March 31, 2025.

In May 2024, T-Mobile US announced it would acquire UScellular's wireless customers and retail outlets, plus 30% of its wireless spectrum licenses in a deal worth $4.4 billion. The deal closed on August 1, 2025; currently known as "USCellular, now a part of T-Mobile", customers and stores will eventually be transitioned to T-Mobile. In addition to the T-Mobile deal, UScellular announced that it had reached agreements to sell 55% of its remaining wireless spectrum license holdings for approximately $1 billion to AT&T and $1 billion to Verizon.

== History ==
=== 1980s and 1990s ===
United States Cellular was founded as a subsidiary of Telephone and Data Systems Inc. (TDS) and incorporated on December 23, 1983. began operations in Knoxville, Tennessee (June), and Tulsa, Oklahoma (August). The company went public in 1988 where United States Cellular adopted USM as its ticker symbol on the American Stock Exchange. In 1999, United States Cellular relaunched under the “U.S. Cellular” brand name and image across all markets nationwide.

=== 2000s ===
The company purchased PrimeCo Wireless Communications in 2002 and launched in the Chicago area on November 22. It built on this growth by signing Chicagoan Joan Cusack as national spokesperson. In January 2003, U.S. Cellular acquired naming rights to the baseball stadium used by the Chicago White Sox. Formerly known as Comiskey Park, the stadium was officially renamed U.S. Cellular Field (it was renamed Guaranteed Rate Field in 2016). That same year, U.S. Cellular and Cingular (now owned by AT&T Mobility) exchanged wireless assets and U.S. Cellular received new spectrum in markets of 13 states. In 2005, U.S. Cellular entered the St. Louis market, making it the second largest market U.S. Cellular served, after Chicago. In October 2008, U.S. Cellular launched Mobile Broadband, a service enabling customers to access data on its cell phones 10 times faster than before. It brought DSL-like service and capabilities to customers through EVDO (Evolution-Data Optimized) technology, commonly referred to as 3G. As of Q2 2008, U.S. Cellular was preparing to roll out 3G/EVDO revision A to select markets.

=== 2010s ===
In May 2011, U.S. Cellular announced that it will offer 4G LTE. In a surprising move, U.S. Cellular announced the sale of several markets to Sprint Corporation including its home market of Chicago. In June 2016, Google announced that it partnered with U.S. Cellular as part of its Google Fi service. U.S. Cellular contributed its network and LTE service to the "network of networks" along with T-Mobile US and Sprint Corporation.

=== 2020s ===
In March 2020, U.S. Cellular debuted launch of 5G in Wisconsin and Iowa U.S. Cellular rebranded as UScellular and upgraded its logo in the fall of that year.

In February 2023, Google Fi discontinued its partnership with UScellular in a statement saying "We will no longer be an official network partner of Google Fi," UScellular senior manager of media relations Katie Frey told CNET over email. "We value our relationship with Google, and we look forward to continuing our collaboration in other ways."

In 2023, parent company TDS, announced that it was exploring strategic alternatives for UScellular.

In January 2024, UScellular shut down its 2G/3G CDMA network with the spectrum being reallocated to its 4G LTE and 5G NR networks.

On May 28, 2024, T-Mobile US announced its intention to acquire most of UScellular's wireless operations, including all of the company’s customers and stores, and 30% of UScellular's wireless spectrum in a transaction valued at 4.4 billion USD. While UScellular would retain 70% of its wireless spectrum and cell sites under the deal, T-Mobile would also be able to lease more than 2,000 towers from the company. On July 11, 2025, the Federal Communications Commission approved the acquisition. The acquisition was completed on August 1, 2025.

== Network ==
=== 4G LTE network ===
U.S. Cellular began offering 4G LTE coverage to customers in the first quarter of 2012. The rollout started in cities in Iowa, Wisconsin, Maine, North Carolina, Texas and Oklahoma. In 2012, U.S. Cellular added 4G LTE in additional markets throughout the country.

Its LTE network was primarily built upon two low-frequency LTE bands; 12 and 5. Through an agreement with King Street Wireless, U.S. Cellular has access to the lower 700 MHz A, B, and C blocks across most of its markets. Spectrum bandwidth includes, 5*5, or 10*10 MHz on band 12 700 MHz 5*5 MHz on band 5 850 MHz 5*5, or 10*10 MHz on band 4 AWS 1. U.S. Cellular also has 5Mhz or 10Mhz of spectrum on Band 66 (AWS-3) in some markets.

The company began VoLTE trials during 2016, launched its first market with VoLTE during the first quarter of 2017.

In December 2019, the FCC found U.S. Cellular shared misinformation about its 4G LTE coverage, exaggerating performance by as much as 38% and only managing to reach the federally mandated minimum speeds 45% of the time.

=== 5G network ===
In June 2019, U.S. Cellular successfully bid for high frequency spectrum in the Federal Communications Commission’s (FCC) Millimeter Wave Spectrum Auctions and purchased licenses covering 98 percent of its subscribers for $256.0 million or 1.7 cents per MHz pop. This laid the foundation for October 2019, when U.S. Cellular officially announced plans to launch its 5G service. The company launched its first phone with support, the Samsung Galaxy S20, as well as coverage maps for its first commercial 5G network in both urban and rural parts of Iowa and Wisconsin in February 2020.

=== Roaming agreements ===
UScellular currently has roaming agreements with AT&T Mobility and Verizon Wireless. This allows customers to roam on AT&T with LTE or 5G speeds and Verizon Wireless with LTE only for no extra charges.

Previously, T-Mobile U.S. was used for LTE and 5G, but that previous agreement wound down in December 2022. UScellular also used Verizon for 1X and 3G roaming before the wind-down of Verizon's CDMA network in the same month.

=== Radio frequency summary ===
The following is a list of known LTE and 5G NR frequency bands which UScellular employed in the United States:

Frequency bands used on the UScellular Network
Frequency Band	Band Number	Protocol	Generation	Status	Notes
600 MHz DD	71	LTE/LTE-A	4G	Being decommissioned / Spectrum sold	Additional LTE band for coverage and capacity in select areas. Most of this spectrum has been sold to T-Mobile US
700 MHz Lower A/B/C Blocks	12	LTE/LTE-A	4G	Being decommissioned / Spectrum sold	Spectrum sold to T-Mobile US and AT&T Mobility
850 MHz CLR	5	LTE/LTE-A	4G	Being decommissioned / Spectrum sold	Spectrum sold to Verizon Wireless
1.9 GHz PCS	2	LTE/LTE-A	4G	Being decommissioned / Spectrum sold	Additional LTE bands for capacity. Spectrum sold to T-Mobile US and Verizon Wireless.
1.7/2.1 GHz AWS	4/66	LTE/LTE-A	4G	Being decommissioned / Spectrum sold	Additional LTE bands for capacity. Spectrum sold to T-Mobile US and Verizon Wireless.
3.5 GHz CBRS	48	LTE/LTE-A	4G	Being decommissioned / Spectrum sold	Spectrum has not been sold.
5.2 GHz U-NII	46	LTE/LTE-A	4G	Being decommissioned / Spectrum sold	License assisted access (LAA). Additional capacity in select areas.
600 MHz DD	n71	NR	5G	Being decommissioned / Spectrum sold	Primary low band for 5G NR network. Most of this spectrum has been sold to T-Mobile US
2.5 GHz BRS/EBS	n41	NR	5G	Being decommissioned / Spectrum sold	Spectrum acquired in 2022 auction. Spectrum sold to T-Mobile US
3.4 GHz C-Band	n77	NR	5G	Being decommissioned / Spectrum sold	Spectrum acquired in 2021 auction. Spectrum sold to AT&T Mobility.
3.7 GHz C-band	n77	NR	5G	Being decommissioned / Spectrum sold	Spectrum will be available for use starting December 2023. Spectrum has not been sold.
24 GHz K-Band	n258	NR	5G	Being decommissioned / Spectrum sold	Spectrum acquired in 2019 auction. Spectrum sold to T-Mobile US
28 GHz Ka-Band	n261	NR	5G	Being decommissioned / Spectrum sold	Currently used for FWA services. Spectrum has not been sold.
39 GHz Ka-Band	n260	NR	5G	Being decommissioned / Spectrum sold	Currently used for FWA services. Spectrum has not been sold.

== Corporate sponsorship ==
UScellular owns the naming rights to:

- UScellular Soccer Complex, in Knoxville, Tennessee
- UScellular Connection Stage at Summerfest in Milwaukee, Wisconsin

Current Sponsorships:

- Presenting Sponsor of the Wisconsin State Fair
- Official Wireless Sponsor of the Milwaukee Brewers since 2008
- Official Wireless Partner of the Green Bay Packers since 2018

It is the official Wireless Provider and partner of:

- Iowa Hawkeyes (University of Iowa)
- Iowa State Cyclones (Iowa State University)
- WVU Mountaineers (West Virginia University)
- UMaine Black Bears (University of Maine)

The company formerly owned the naming rights to:

- U.S. Cellular Center in Cedar Rapids, Iowa – now Alliant Energy PowerHouse
- U.S. Cellular Grandstand at the Kansas State Fairgrounds in Hutchinson, Kansas – now Nex-Tech Wireless Grandstand
- U.S. Cellular Arena in Milwaukee – now UW–Milwaukee Panther Arena
- U.S. Cellular Field in Chicago – now Rate Field
- U.S. Cellular Center in Asheville, North Carolina – now Harrah's Cherokee Center
- U.S. Cellular Community Park in Medford, Oregon – now Lithia & Driveway Fields

UScellular had served as the presenting sponsor of the 80/35 Music Festival in Des Moines, Iowa. It also served as the title sponsor of a NASCAR Xfinity Series race until 2019, the U.S. Cellular 250, at Iowa Speedway in Newton, Iowa.

== Sound logo ==
The sonic logo, tag, audio mnemonic was produced by Musikvergnuegen and written by Walter Werzowa from the Austrian 1980s sampling band Edelweiss.
