= LG Envoy II =

LG Electronics phone

- Brand: LG Electronics
- Manufacturer: LG Electronics
- Series: Envoy
- First released: United States June 6, 2013; 13 years ago (U.S. Cellular)
- Compatible networks: CDMA (800 MHz, 1.9 GHz PCS); 1xRTT
- Form factor: Flip
- Dimensions: 3.9 (H) x 2.0 (W) x 0.7 (D)
- Weight: 3.66 oz (104 g)
- Memory: 129 MB
- Battery: 950 mAh; Stand-by time: Up to 12.5 days Talk time: Up to 5 hours
- Rear camera: 1.3 MP (1280 x 960 default resolution)
- Display: 2.2 in, 176 x 220 pixels, 256-color TFT
- External display: 0.98 in, 96 x 64 pixels, monochrome MSTN
- Connectivity: Bluetooth 2.1 + EDR; S-GPS; U.S. Cellular
- Model: UN160
- Other: Preloaded games (UNO), Image Editor, AccuWeather

The LG Envoy II (pronounced 'ahn-voy") is a flip phone manufactured and branded by LG Electronics. It was released in June 2013 by U.S. Cellular. Similar to U.S. Cellular phones, the Envoy II uses the Sprint Mobile telecommunication.

In terms of design, it has a plactic design at the back and the front panel is made of gloss with a 0.98-inch monochrome display.

CNET reviewer Lynn La noticed average display, lack of headphone audio jack, and some design flaws as a negative feature.

== Features ==
- External monochrome display
- 1.3MP rear camera + Image Editor
- Bluetooth 2.1 + EDR
- Pre-installed games
- App and ringtone store from U.S. Cellular
- Myriad 6.2-powered Web browser
