= Lynn H. Nicholas =

American historian

Lynn H. Nicholas is the author of The Rape of Europa, an account of Nazi plunder of looted art treasures from occupied countries. Her honors and awards include the Légion d'Honneur by France, Amicus Poloniae by Poland, and the National Book Critics Circle Award.

== Biography ==
She was born in New London, Connecticut, and educated in the United States, Great Britain, and Spain. Nicholas was awarded the Légion d'Honneur by France and was named an Amicus Poloniae by Poland. The book won the National Book Critics Circle Award for general non-fiction in 1994, and it was adapted for a film of the same name released in 2006. She also wrote Cruel World: The Children of Europe in the Nazi Web.
