= Shut Up (and Sleep with Me) =

Single by Sin With Sebastian

from the album Golden Boy
- Released: 1 May 1995
- Recorded: 1995
- Genre: Eurodance; Europop; hi-NRG
- Length: 3:47
- Label: Sing Sing
- Songwriter: Sebastian Roth
- Producers: Inga Humpe; Sebastian Roth

Sin With Sebastian singles chronology
"Shut Up (and Sleep with Me)" (1995)	"Golden Boy" (1995)

Music video
- "Shut Up (and Sleep with Me)" on YouTube

Alternative cover
- CD maxi - Remixes

"Shut Up (and Sleep with Me)" is a song by German Eurodance artist Sin With Sebastian, released in May 1995 by the Sing Sing label as the lead single from his debut album, Golden Boy (1995). The song features classic opera vocals by singer Donna Lynn Bowers a.k.a. Steve. Co-produced by Inga Humpe and Sebastian Roth (the real name of SWS), who also wrote it, the song became a Europe-wide hit, reaching number-one in Austria, Finland, Lithuania and Spain. It received a gold certification in Germany, and was nominated to the 1996 Echo Awards for the best German dance single. The accompanying music video, directed by Matthias Schweger, received heavy rotation on European music television channels. "Shut Up (and Sleep with Me)" was included on the soundtrack to the 1997 German film Silvester Countdown and featured in a commercial for Tulipan Condoms.

== Chart performance ==
"Shut Up (and Sleep with Me)" was very successful on the charts all over Europe, peaking at number-one in Austria (7 weeks), Finland, Lithuania and Spain, where it spent five weeks at the top position. In Belgium, the single was a number two hit for four weeks, and entered the top 10 also in Denmark (5), Germany (4), Italy (10), the Netherlands (3), Sweden (3), and Switzerland (6), as well as on the Eurochart Hot 100 and MTV's European Top 20, where it reached numbers ten and three, respectively.

In Sin With Sebastian's native Germany, it spent 23 weeks within the German Singles Chart between June and November 1995. Additionally, "Shut Up (and Sleep with Me)" was a top-50 hit in Scotland (49) and the UK. In the latter, it peaked at number 44 in its first week at the UK Singles Chart, on 10 September 1995. On the UK Dance Singles Chart, the song fared better, reaching number 36. Outside Europe, it peaked at two on the RPM Dance/Urban chart in Canada and number 26 on the Billboard Hot Dance Club Play chart in the US.

"Shut Up (and Sleep with Me)" received a gold certification in Germany, after 250,000 singles were sold there.

== Critical reception ==
Larry Flick from Billboard magazine wrote, "Here is a novelty number for the Euro-pop twirler in all of us. The vocals are utter camp, lying somewhere between Marc Almond and Jimmy Somerville in style, and the groove is springy and fun." Matthew J. Palm from The Ithaca Journal complimented it as a "stellar example" of the synthesized Europop sound and said it is "almost hypnotic". Simon Price from Melody Maker named it Single of the Week, noting that it "evokes distilled essence of Army of Lovers/'I'm Too Sexy'/Sexus/'Tainted Love'". He concluded, "Exploding, plastic, inevitable." In a separate review, Price praised it as "four minutes of butt-slapping, operatic, Hi-NRG Euro-genius, and an instant Number One in every region of the EU from the naughty north to the sexy south...with the bizarre irony that many millions of our continental comraded didn't even realise what the lyrics were prodding towards."

A reviewer from Music Week gave it a score of four out of five, saying, "This year's red hot record in the European holiday resorts is a feast of sleazy camp. Once heard, never forgotten and, hence, a huge UK hit." James Hyman from the Record Mirror Dance Update commented, "Prize candidate for novelty pop record of the year. With the camp, male monotone title hook added to female operatic vocals of 'you are young, you are free; why don't you sleep with me?', this record's simplicity is further reinforced with a gentle tinkling piano." He also added that the George Morel remix "wisely keeps the vocals and whoops things up into a tamer version of Armand van Helden's 'Witch Doctor'." Another Record Mirror editor, James Hamilton, described it as a "ambivalent sexual proposition lisped through Somerville'ish whinnying" in his weekly dance column. DJ Stan from Smash Hits wrote, "Great title, bad 'tune'. The only person who should shut up is Sebastian with his monotone mantra and corny opera backing. Truly awful but our ed loves it, so maybe there's some hope for the young Sebastian boy yet."

== Music video ==
The music video for "Shut Up (and Sleep with Me)" was directed by Austrian director Matthias Schweger. Simon Price of Melody Maker said, "You've seen the video. A skinny Romosexual, electric blue, no, shocking pink, no, custard blond hair smeared in the style of the Twenties around a face of bone china, gazing into the camera with kohled eyes and, in perfect TEFL-elocuted Euro-English, imploring you: SHUT UP...AND SLEEP WITH ME." A similar video was made for the remix by American DJ and record producer George Morel. "Shut Up (and Sleep with Me)" was A-listed on German music television channel VIVA in July 1995. It was also A-listed on Dutch TMF and received heavy rotation on MTV Europe in September. The video was later made available on YouTube in 2018, and had generated more than five million views as of 2025.

== Awards ==
The success of "Shut Up (and Sleep with Me)" led to Sin With Sebastian being nominated to the 1996 Echo Awards in the category for Best German Dance Single. He was also nominated in the category for Best Dance at the 1995 MTV Europe Music Awards and it earned the artist an award at the 1996 Dance d'Or Awards in France.

== Track listing ==
- 12" single, UK & Europe (1995)
1. "Shut Up (and Sleep with Me)" (George Morel's Club Mix) – 7:17
2. "Shut Up (and Sleep with Me)" (Gym Shower Mix) – 6:28
3. "Shut Up (and Sleep with Me)" (Ian Levine Mix) – 5:13
- CD single, Europe (1995)
1. "Shut Up (and Sleep with Me)" (Airplay Mix) – 3:45
2. "Shut Up (and Sleep with Me)" (George Morel's Dub Mix) – 7:17
- CD maxi, Europe (1995)
1. "Shut Up (and Sleep with Me)" (Airplay Mix) – 3:45
2. "Shut Up (and Sleep with Me)" (YMCA Mix) – 5:25
3. "Shut Up (and Sleep with Me)" (Kaspar's Camp Mix) – 5:12
4. "Shut Up (and Sleep with Me)" (Gym Shower Mix) – 6:28
- CD maxi - Remixes, Europe (1995)
1. "Shut Up (and Sleep with Me)" (George Morel's Club Mix) – 7:17
2. "Shut Up (and Sleep with Me)" (George Morel's Dub Mix) – 7:17
3. "Shut Up (and Sleep with Me)" (George Morel's Video Edit) – 3:55
4. "Shut Up (and Sleep with Me)" (Gym Shower Mix) – 6:33
5. "Shut Up (and Sleep with Me)" (Kaspar's Camp Mix) – 5:08
6. "Shut Up (and Sleep with Me)" (Ian Levine Mix) – 5:13
7. "Shut Up (and Sleep with Me)" (YMCA Mix) – 5:25
8. "Shut Up (and Sleep with Me)" (George Morel's Alternative Club Mix) – 6:33

== Charts ==
=== Weekly charts ===
Chart (1995–1996)	Peak position
Austria (Ö3 Austria Top 40)	1
Belgium (Ultratop 50 Flanders)	2
Belgium (Ultratop 50 Wallonia)	6
Canada Dance/Urban (RPM)	2
Denmark (IFPI)	5
Europe (Eurochart Hot 100)	10
Europe (European Dance Radio)	17
Finland (Suomen virallinen lista)	1
Germany (GfK)	4
Israel (Israeli Singles Chart)	3
Italy (Musica e dischi)	10
Lithuania (M-1)	1
Netherlands (Dutch Top 40)	4
Netherlands (Single Top 100)	3
Quebec (ADISQ)	22
Scottish Singles Sales (Official Charts)	49
Spain (AFYVE)	1
Sweden (Sverigetopplistan)	3
Switzerland (Schweizer Hitparade)	6
UK Singles (Official Charts)	44
UK Dance (Official Charts)	36
UK Club Chart (Music Week)	42
UK Pop Tip Club Chart (Music Week)	38
US Hot Dance Club Play (Billboard)	26
US Maxi-Singles Sales (Billboard)	34

=== Year-end charts ===
Chart (1995)	Position
Austria (Ö3 Austria Top 40)	5
Belgium (Ultratop 50 Flanders)	19
Belgium (Ultratop 50 Wallonia)	49
Europe (Eurochart Hot 100)	26
Europe (European Dance Radio)	24
Germany (Media Control)	21
Israel (Israeli Singles Chart)	10
Latvia (Latvijas Top 50)	37
Netherlands (Dutch Top 40)	47
Netherlands (Single Top 100)	59
Sweden (Topplistan)	39
Switzerland (Schweizer Hitparade)	54

=== Decade-end charts ===
Chart (1990–1999)	Rank
Austria (Ö3 Austria Top 40)	73

== Certifications ==
Region	Certification	Certified units/sales
Germany (BVMI)	Gold	250,000^{^}
^{^} Shipments figures based on certification alone.
