= Golden Boy (Sin with Sebastian song) =

Single by Sin With Sebastian

from the album Golden Boy
- Released: October 1995
- Genre: Eurodance
- Length: 3:47
- Label: BMG Ariola Media GmbH
- Songwriter: Sin With Sebastian
- Producers: Chris Von Deylen; Inga Humpe

Sin With Sebastian singles chronology
"Shut Up (and Sleep with Me)" (1995)	"Golden Boy" (1995)	"He Belongs to Me" (1997)

Music video
- "Golden Boy" on YouTube

Golden Boy is a song by German Eurodance artist Sin With Sebastian, released in October 1995, by BMG Ariola, as the second single from his debut album of the same name (1995). The song was written by him and produced by Chris Von Deylen and Inga Humpe. It was the follow-up to the artist's successful hit single "Shut Up (and Sleep with Me)" and was released on CD format. Lyrically it discusses a certain view on life and lifestyle: fun loving, being lazy, partying and the distinctive feeling of being "special" and "the best". "Golden Boy" peaked at number four in Finland and number 45 in Belgium.

== Music video ==
The accompanying music video for "Golden Boy" was directed by Austrian director Matthias Schweger. The video is distinctive for content such as faces amongst heaps of fruit and half-naked male dancers moving around the female singer who is holding a baby "golden boy". In 2008, when Sin With Sebastian looked through their archives they found some footage that was filmed during the time of the making of the video clip. Schweger had previously directed the music video for "Shut Up (and Sleep with Me)".

== Credits ==
Mixing: Andreas Herbig
Music, Lyrics & Programming: Sebastian Roth
Producers: Chris Von Deylen, Inga Humpe

== Charts ==
Chart (1995–1996)	Peak position
Belgium (Ultratop 50 Flanders)	45
Europe (European Dance Radio)	17
Finland (Suomen virallinen lista)	4
