= Faithful (1996 film) =

- Directed by: Paul Mazursky
- Screenplay by: Chazz Palminteri
- Based on: Faithful by Chazz Palminteri
- Produced by: Robert De Niro; Jane Rosenthal
- Starring: Cher; Chazz Palminteri; Ryan O'Neal
- Cinematography: Fred Murphy
- Edited by: Nicholas C. Smith
- Music by: Phillip Johnston
- Production companies: Savoy Pictures; Miramax Films; TriBeCa Productions; Price Entertainment
- Distributed by: New Line Cinema (United States); Miramax International (International)
- Release date: April 19, 1996
- Running time: 91 minutes
- Country: United States
- Language: English
- Budget: $13 million
- Box office: $2.1 million

Faithful is a 1996 American comedy crime drama film directed by Paul Mazursky and starring Cher, Chazz Palminteri and Ryan O'Neal. Palminteri wrote the screenplay, which is an adaptation of his stage play of the same name. Faithful tells the story of a woman, her husband and a hit man. The film was entered into the 46th Berlin International Film Festival. This is Mazursky's final theatrical film as director.

== Plot ==
On her twentieth wedding anniversary, Maggie receives a diamond necklace and a price on her head; both from her husband, Jack. While waiting for the signal, all the way from Connecticut, to do the murder, the hitman Tony starts bonding with Maggie instead. Later, Jack shows up himself, complicating the entire situation.

== Cast ==
- Cher as Margaret Connor
- Chazz Palminteri as Tony
- Ryan O'Neal as Jack Connor
- Paul Mazursky as Dr. Susskind
- Amber Smith as Debbie
- Elisa Leonetti as Maria
- Mark Nassar as Maria's Boyfriend
- Stephen Spinella as Young Man At Rolls
- Jeffrey Wright as Young Man At Rolls
- David Marino as Little Tony
- Steven Randazzo as Tony's Father
- Olinda Turturro as Tony's Mother
- Allison Janney as Saleswoman
- Max Norat as Jewellery Store Salesman

== Reception ==
The film was received poorly at the box office, grossing just $2,104,439. It was a huge drop compared to Cher's previous starring role, Mermaids, which grossed $35,419,397 in 1990. The film's opening weekend of just $967,956 would end as 46% of the film's total gross. This film was Cher's least successful film of the decade in a starring role.

The film was widely panned by film critics. On the review aggregator website Rotten Tomatoes, 7% of 14 critics' reviews are positive, with an average rating of 4/10. Multiple critics wrote that the story had obviously been written for theatre, and had not converted well to the motion picture medium. Writing in Entertainment Weekly, Owen Gleiberman described it as "an awkward hybrid of Deathtrap, Scenes from a Marriage, and a David Mamet barstool rant." The Austin Chronicle gave it one and a half stars, commenting that "The dialogue packs a lot of witty one-liners, yet their power is insufficient to carry this dud. ... The comedy never works up enough froth to overcome the movie's implausibility. Palminteri is carving himself a familiar niche as a personifier of tough guys with soft spots, but this chatty hit man is not of this world." Roger Ebert similarly praised the dialogue as clever but felt it was outweighed by the predictable plot and logic holes such as the "kill" signal being two telephone rings (apparently leaving no room for the possibilities of someone else calling the house or of Jack calling the hit off). He gave Faithful two and a half stars, summarizing it as "the kind of movie that's diverting while you're watching it, mostly because of the actors' appeal, but it evaporates the moment it's over, because it’s not really about anything. Nothing is at stake, the relationships are not three-dimensional enough for us to care about them, and it's likely that nobody will get killed."
