= Paul Mazursky =

American director, screenwriter, and actor (1930–2014)

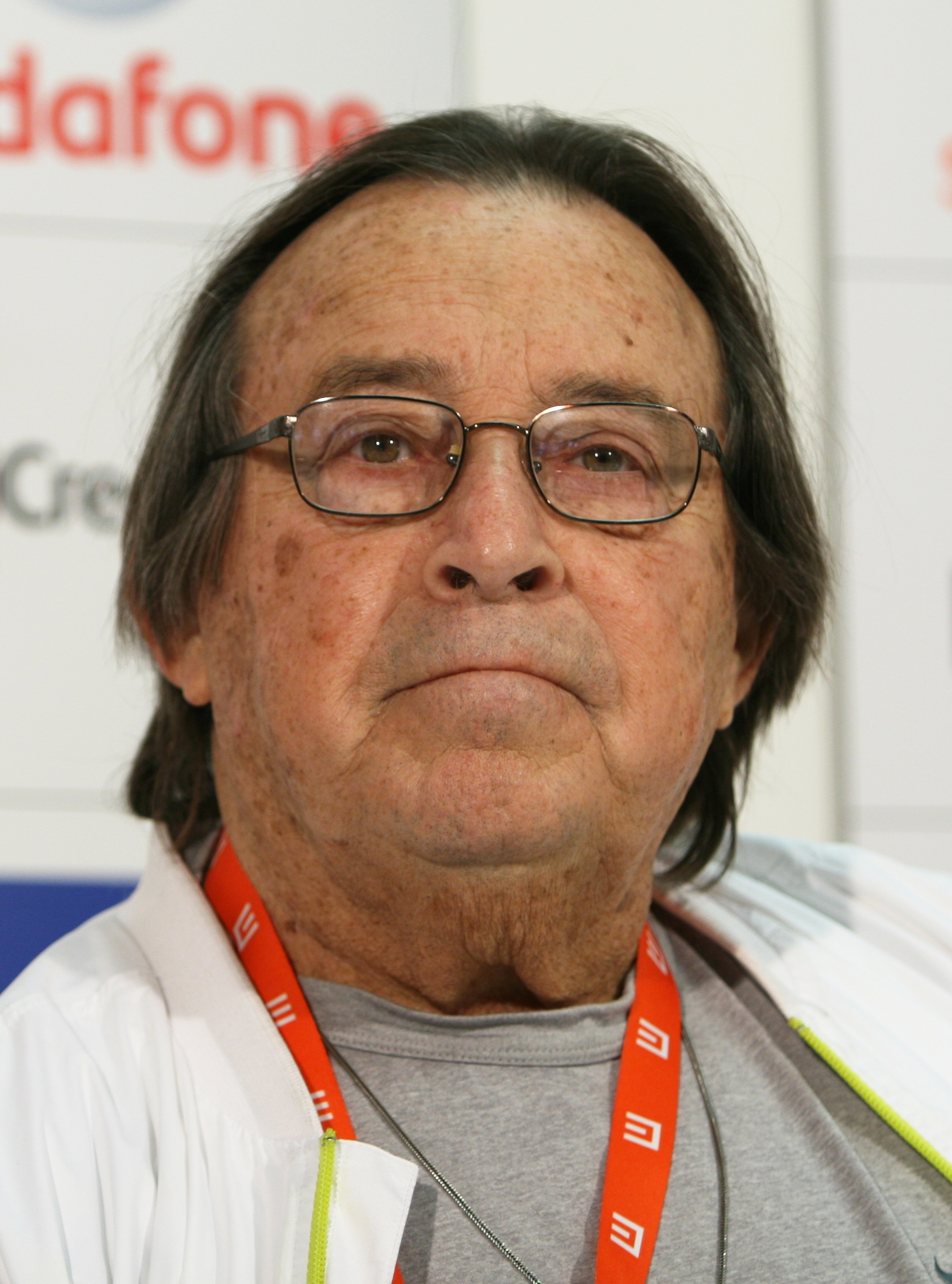
- Mazursky at the 43rd Karlovy Vary International Film Festival in 2008
- Born: Irwin Lawrence Mazursky; April 25, 1930; Brooklyn, New York, United States
- Died: June 30, 2014 (aged 84); Los Angeles, California, United States
- Education: Brooklyn College
- Occupations: Film director; screenwriter; actor
- Years active: 1953–2011
- Spouse: Betsy Mazursky (m. 1953)
- Children: 2

Irwin Lawrence "Paul" Mazursky (/məˈzɜːrski/; April 25, 1930 – June 30, 2014) was an American film director, screenwriter, and actor. Known for his dramatic comedies that often dealt with modern social issues, he was nominated for five Academy Awards for Bob & Carol & Ted & Alice (1969), Harry and Tonto (1974), An Unmarried Woman (1978), and Enemies, A Love Story (1989). He is also known for directing the autobiographical Next Stop, Greenwich Village (1976), Moscow on the Hudson (1984), Down and Out in Beverly Hills (1986), Moon over Parador (1988), and Scenes from a Mall (1991).

== Early life and education ==
He was born into a Jewish family in Brooklyn, New York, the son of Jean (née Gerson), a piano player for dance classes, and David Mazursky, a laborer. Mazursky's grandfather was an immigrant from the Russian Empire city of Kobrin (modern Belarus). Mazursky graduated from Brooklyn College in 1951.

== Career ==
Mazursky began his film career as an actor in Stanley Kubrick's first feature, Fear and Desire (1953). Mazursky, who never liked his first name of Irwin, was asked by his then-girlfriend Betty Purdy what name he wanted to use in the credits for the film, as he had told Kubrick to use her as a go-between when he was busy waiting tables at Sunrise Manor. When on the phone with her, she suggested using Paul for his screen name, which he agreed with. Two years later he appeared in a featured position as one of a classroom of teenagers with issues towards authority in The Blackboard Jungle (1955). His acting career continued for several decades, starting with parts in episodes of television series such as The Twilight Zone and The Rifleman. He also did shows for nightclubs in the late 1950s, including with Herb Hartig in a comedy act named "Igor and H" before breaking up to do a solo act. He applied unsuccessfully to the Actors Studio, but he took classes from Lee Strasberg, having previously studied under Paul Mann and Curt Conway.

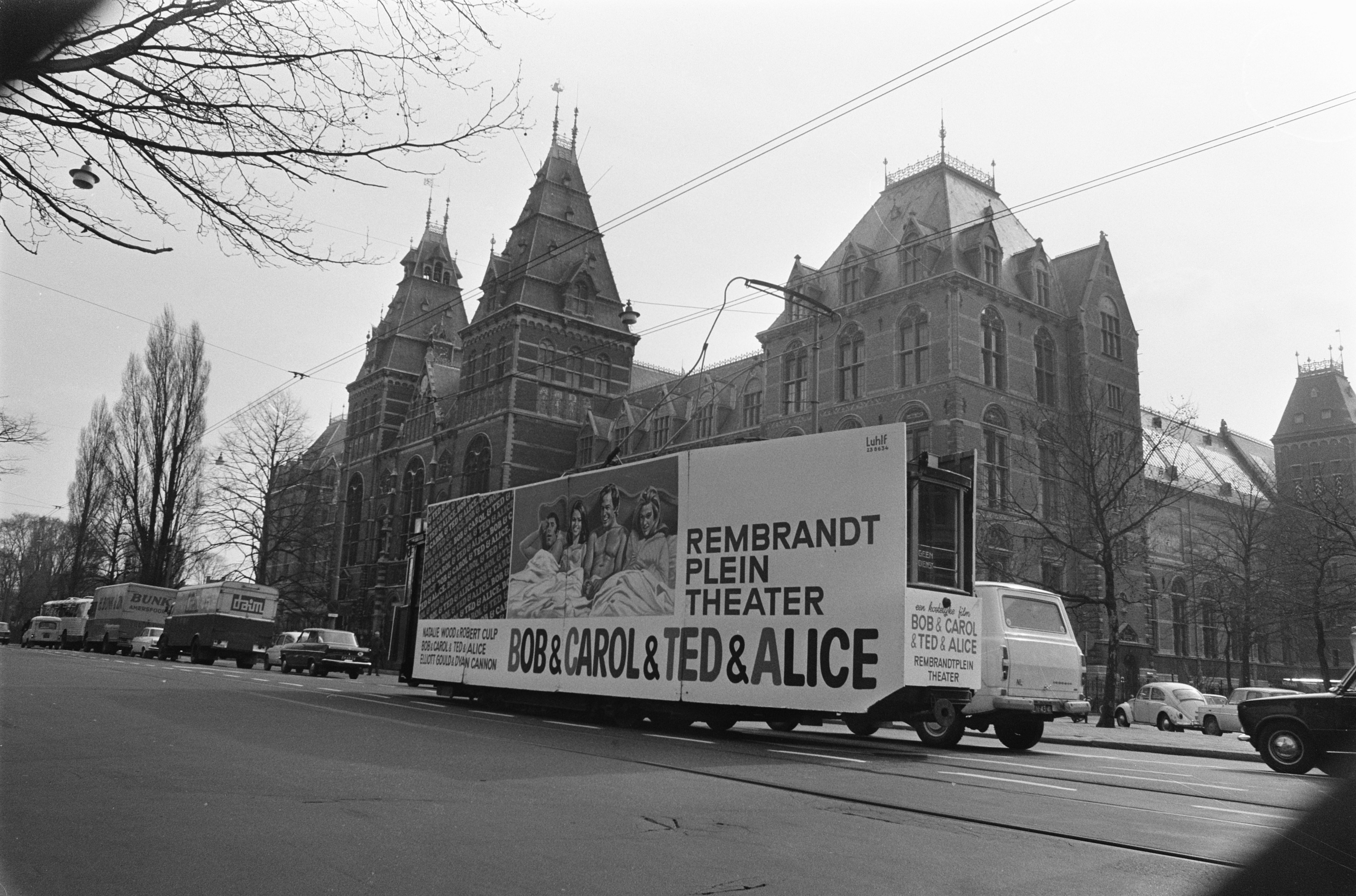
Advertising tram for the film "Bob & Carol & Ted & Alice" in Amsterdam, Netherlands (March 26, 1970).

Soon after starting his acting career, Mazursky became a writer on The Danny Kaye Show in 1963 with Larry Tucker, who he had met when Tucker went from managing comedians to being in the Los Angeles Second City troupe. In 1965, they crafted the script for the pilot of The Monkees television series, in which they both also appeared in cameos, although the pilot ended up being their only script for the series. Mazursky's debut as a film screenwriter was the Peter Sellers comedy I Love You, Alice B. Toklas (1968). The original intent was for Tucker to produce and for Mazursky to direct. Peter Sellers, the star of the film, instead picked Hy Averback to direct. The following year, he directed his first film Bob & Carol & Ted & Alice (1969) which he also co-wrote with its producer Tucker, which proved to be a major critical and commercial success. The film was the fifth highest grossing of the year and earned Mazursky his first Oscar nomination.

His career behind the camera continued for two decades as he wrote and directed a prolific string of quirky, dramatic and critically popular films. His most successful films were contemporary dramatic comedies, including the Academy Award-winning Harry and Tonto (1974), the Best Picture-nominated An Unmarried Woman (1978), and popular hits such as Moscow on the Hudson (1984) and Down and Out in Beverly Hills (1986). In light of his comedies that tackled modern social subjects, The Hollywood Reporter stated that "from the late '60s through the '80s, [he] seemed to channel the zeitgeist..." and Variety stated that "his oeuvre smacks of cultural significance."

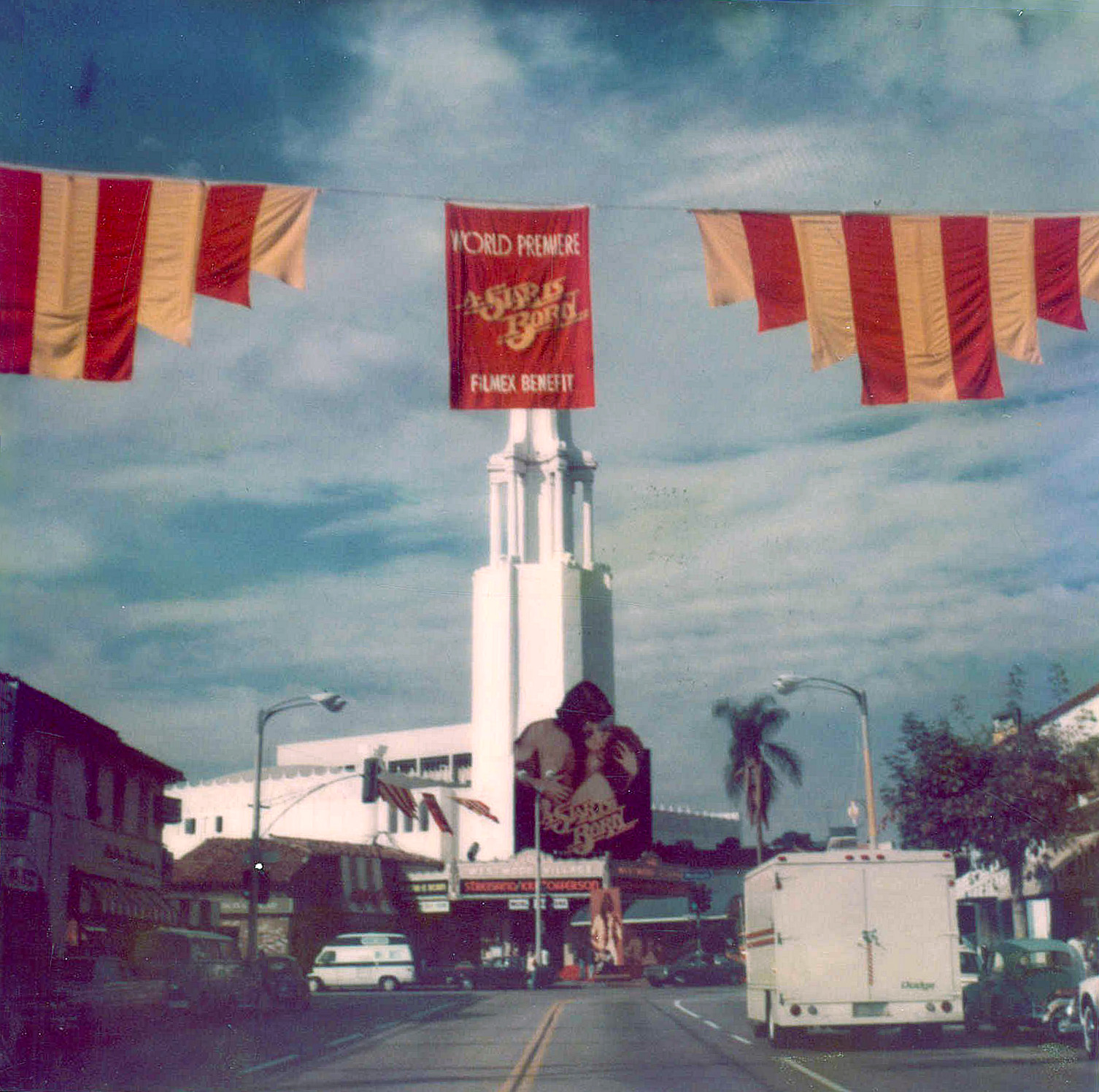
World premiere of A Star is Born at the Fox Theater, Westwood Village

Other films made by Mazursky during this time include the Hollywood satire Alex in Wonderland (1970), the cutting Los Angeles relationship comedy Blume in Love (1973), and the semi-autobiographical coming-of-age story Next Stop, Greenwich Village (1976). Mazursky played supporting roles in The Other Side of the Wind (1972; finished 2015) and A Star Is Born (1976). He also directed the 1980s New York City-based Jules and Jim homage Willie & Phil (1980), the contemporary Shakespeare comedy Tempest (1982), the Caribbean political farce Moon over Parador (1988), and the acclaimed Isaac Bashevis Singer adaptation Enemies, a Love Story (1989). Late in his life, Mazursky was developing a Broadway musical adaptation of his 1988 film Moon over Parador. He had supporting roles in History of the World, Part I (1981), Into the Night (1985), Punchline (1988) and Scenes from the Class Struggle in Beverly Hills (1989).

Mazursky appeared in supporting roles or cameos in most of his own films. In Moon over Parador (1988), with the Rio Opera House available for only three days of shooting, Mazursky cast himself as a dictator's mother when Judith Malina was unavailable, playing the character in drag. He also acted in 1990s in projects such as Man Trouble (1992), Carlito's Way (1993), Love Affair (1994), 2 Days in the Valley (1996), Miami Rhapsody (1995), Crazy in Alabama (1999), and I Want Someone to Eat Cheese With (2006). He performed the voice of the Psychologist in Antz (1998). He experienced less success in the 1990s directing Scenes from a Mall (1991), starring Woody Allen and Bette Midler.

Following his filmmaking satire The Pickle (1993), which was his last writing credit, Mazursky worked only sporadically as a director on such films as Faithful (1996), Winchell (1998), and Coast to Coast (2003). His final film was the independent documentary Yippee (2006). In later years, Mazursky had a small part as "Sunshine" the poker dealer in The Sopranos. He also appeared in five episodes of season 4 of Curb Your Enthusiasm as Mel Brooks' associate Norm, a role that he later reprised in a season 7 episode. In his autobiography Show Me the Magic (1999), Mazursky recounts his experiences in filmmaking and with several well-known screen personalities including Peter Sellers. He was the subject of the 2011 book Paul on Mazursky by Sam Wasson. Mazursky appeared as himself in a number of documentaries on film, including A Decade Under the Influence, New York at the Movies, and Screenwriters: Words Into Image. From 2011 until his death in 2014, Mazursky served as a film critic for Vanity Fair.

== Legacy ==
Every film written and directed by Mazursky used New York City or Los Angeles as one of its settings. In 1991 the Los Angeles Times commented that "No filmmaker has been wiser or funnier about the L.A. cavalcade than Mazursky. It's not simply a matter of being hip to the scene; what makes such L.A. movies as Bob & Carol & Ted & Alice and Alex in Wonderland and Blume in Love and Down and Out in Beverly Hills soar is Mazursky's wide-eyed infatuation with the city's rampant pop nuttiness." His films received a total of twelve Academy Award nominations, with one win, and nineteen Golden Globe nominations, with two wins. Film critic Roger Ebert was a particular fan of Mazursky's work, giving six of his films the optimal four stars in his reviews. In 1986, Ebert stated that "Mazursky has a way of making comedies that are more intelligent and relevant than most of the serious films around."

== Personal life ==
Mazursky was married to librarian and social worker Betsy Mazursky (née Purdy) from 1953 until his death. They had two daughters, Meg and Jill. Mazursky was an atheist.

Mazursky went into cardiopulmonary arrest and died on June 30, 2014, aged 84, at Cedars-Sinai Medical Center in Los Angeles.

== Filmography ==
=== Film ===
Year	Title	Director	Writer
1968	I Love You, Alice B. Toklas	No	Yes
1969	Bob & Carol & Ted & Alice	Yes	Yes
1970	Alex in Wonderland	Yes	Yes
1973	Blume in Love	Yes	Yes
1974	Harry and Tonto	Yes	Yes
1976	Next Stop, Greenwich Village	Yes	Yes
1978	An Unmarried Woman	Yes	Yes
1980	Willie & Phil	Yes	Yes
1982	Tempest	Yes	Yes
1984	Moscow on the Hudson	Yes	Yes
1986	Down and Out in Beverly Hills	Yes	Yes
1988	Moon over Parador	Yes	Yes
1989	Enemies, A Love Story	Yes	Yes
1991	Scenes from a Mall	Yes	Yes
1993	The Pickle	Yes	Yes
1996	Faithful	Yes	No
2006	Yippee	Yes	No

Acting credits

Year	Title	Role	Notes
1953	Fear and Desire	Pvt. Sidney	
1955	Blackboard Jungle	Emmanuel Stoker	
1965	Deathwatch	Maurice	
1968	I Love You, Alice B. Toklas	Hippie on Sidewalk	Uncredited
1969	Bob & Carol & Ted & Alice	Man Screaming at the Institute	Uncredited
1970	Alex in Wonderland	Hal Stern	
1972	The Other Side of the Wind	Paul	finished posthumously in 2018
1973	Blume in Love	Kurt Hellman	
1974	Harry and Tonto	Prostitute	Uncredited
1976	Next Stop, Greenwich Village	Casting Director	Uncredited
1976	A Star Is Born	Brian Wexler	
1978	An Unmarried Woman	Hal	
1979	A Man, a Woman, and a Bank	Norman Barrie	
1979	An Almost Perfect Affair	Himself	Uncredited
1981	History of the World, Part I	Roman Officer	(The Roman Empire)
1982	Tempest	Terry Bloomfield	Producer
1984	Moscow on the Hudson	Dave	
1985	Into the Night	Bud Herman	
1986	Down and Out in Beverly Hills	Sidney Waxman	
1988	Moon over Parador	Momma	Credited as Carlotta Gerson
1988	Punchline	Arnold	
1989	Scenes from the Class Struggle in Beverly Hills	Sidney Lipkin	
1989	Enemies, a Love Story	Leon Tortshiner	
1991	Scenes from a Mall	Dr. Hans Clava	
1992	Man Trouble	Lee MacGreevy	
1993	The Pickle	Butch Levine	
1993	Carlito's Way	Judge Feinstein	
1994	Love Affair	Herb Stillman	
1995	Miami Rhapsody	Vic Marcus	
1996	Faithful	Mr. Susskind	
1996	2 Days in the Valley	Teddy Peppers	
1997	Touch	Artie	
1998	Bulworth	Himself	Uncredited
1998	Why Do Fools Fall in Love	Morris Levy	
1998	Antz	Psychologist	Voice
1999	Crazy in Alabama	Walter Schwegmann	
2001	The Majestic	Studio Executive	Voice
2001	Big Shot's Funeral	Studio Boss	
2002	Do It for Uncle Manny	Famous Movie Director	
2006	I Want Someone to Eat Cheese With	Charlie Perlman	
2006	Cattle Call	Judge Mandel	
2011	Kung Fu Panda 2	Musician Bunny	Voice
2018	The Other Side of the Wind	Himself	(final film role)

=== Television ===
TV series

- The Monkees (1966-1968) (developer and writer)

TV movies

- Winchell (1998) (director)
- Coast to Coast (2003) (director)

Acting credits

Year	Film	Role	Notes
1966	The Monkees	T.V. Interviewer	Episode "The Monkees"
1996	Frasier	Vinnie	Voice, Episode "The Last Time I Saw Maris"
1999–2002	Once and Again	Phil Brooks	6 episodes
2000–2001	The Sopranos	Sunshine	2 episodes
2003	Coast to Coast	Stanley Tarto	TV movie
2004–2009	Curb Your Enthusiasm	Norm	5 episodes
2011	Femme Fatales	Warden Jeffries	2 episodes

== Awards and honors ==
Mazursky received five Academy Award nominations, four for his screenplay writing on Bob & Carol & Ted & Alice (1969), Harry and Tonto (1974), An Unmarried Woman (1978), and Enemies, a Love Story (1989), and once as producer of An Unmarried Woman (nominated for Best Picture). He was also twice nominated for a Golden Globe and twice for the Cannes Film Festival's Palme d'Or, among many other awards. In 2000, he was the recipient of the Austin Film Festival's Distinguished Screenwriter Award. In 2000, he was awarded the Amicus Poloniae (Latin: "Friend of Poland"), which is a distinction established by the Polish ambassador to the United States and conferred annually on citizens of the United States for special contributions to Polish-American relations. In 2010, the Los Angeles Film Critics Association honored him with an award for Career Achievement. On December 13, 2013, Mazursky was awarded the 2,515th star of the Hollywood Walk of Fame, in front of Musso & Frank Grill. Friends and collaborators Mel Brooks, Richard Dreyfuss, and Jeff Garlin were all present.

On February 1, 2014, at the WGA Awards, Mazursky received the Screen Laurel Award, which is the lifetime achievement award of the Writers Guild of America. Comedian, filmmaker and close friend Mel Brooks presented the award. In May 2014, Mazursky received the Best of Brooklyn Award at his alma mater Brooklyn College's annual gala in New York City. In 2015, Joe Swanberg's film Digging for Fire was dedicated in memory to Mazursky. In 2019, Greg Pritikin dedicated his film The Last Laugh to Mazursky.

Year	Association	Category	Project	Result	Ref.
1968	Writers Guild of America	Best Original Screenplay	I Love You, Alice B. Toklas	Nominated	
1969	Academy Award	Best Original Screenplay	Bob & Carol & Ted & Alice	Nominated	
1969	BAFTA Award	Best Screenplay	Bob & Carol & Ted & Alice	Nominated	
1969	Writers Guild of America Award	Best Original Screenplay	Bob & Carol & Ted & Alice	Won	
1969	National Society of Film Critics	Best Screenplay	Bob & Carol & Ted & Alice	Won	
1969	New York Film Critics Circle	Best Screenplay	Bob & Carol & Ted & Alice	Won	
1970	New York Film Critics Circle	Best Supporting Actor	Alex in Wonderland	Nominated	
1973	Writers Guild of America Award	Best Original Screenplay	Blume in Love	Nominated	
1974	Academy Award	Best Original Screenplay	Harry and Tonto	Nominated	
1974	Writers Guild of America Award	Best Original Screenplay	Harry and Tonto	Nominated	
1976	Cannes Film Festival	Palme d'Or	Next Stop, Greenwich Village	Nominated	
1976	Writers Guild of America Award	Best Original Screenplay	Next Stop, Greenwich Village	Nominated	
1978	Academy Awards	Best Picture	An Unmarried Woman	Nominated	
1978	Academy Awards	Best Original Screenplay	An Unmarried Woman	Nominated	
1978	Golden Globe Awards	Best Director	An Unmarried Woman	Nominated	
1978	Golden Globe Awards	Best Screenplay	An Unmarried Woman	Nominated	
1978	Cannes Film Festival	Palme d'Or	An Unmarried Woman	Nominated	
1978	Directors Guild of America Award	Outstanding Directing - Feature Film	An Unmarried Woman	Nominated	
1978	Writers Guild of America Award	Best Original Screenplay	An Unmarried Woman	Nominated	
1978	National Society of Film Critics	Best Screenplay	An Unmarried Woman	Won	
1978	New York Film Critics Circle	Best Screenplay	An Unmarried Woman	Won	
1978	Los Angeles Film Critics Association	Best Screenplay	An Unmarried Woman	Won	
1982	Venice International Film Festival	Golden Lion	Tempest	Nominated	
1982	Toronto International Film Festival	People's Choice Award	Tempest	Won	
1986	Writers Guild of America Award	Best Adapted Screenplay	Down and Out in Beverly Hills	Nominated	
1989	Academy Award	Best Adapted Screenplay	Enemies, A Love Story	Nominated	
1989	New York Film Critics Circle	Best Director	Enemies, A Love Story	Won	
1996	Berlin International Film Festival	Golden Bear	Faithful	Nominated	
