= Coast to Coast (2003 film) =

- Based on: Coast to Coast by Frederic Raphael
- Directed by: Paul Mazursky
- Starring: Richard Dreyfuss; Judy Davis; Selma Blair; Fred Ward; Maximilian Schell
- Theme music composer: Bill Conti
- Countries of origin: United States, Canada
- Original language: English

Production
- Executive producers: Jerry Leider; Richard Waltzer
- Producer: Michael Levine
- Cinematography: Jean Lépine
- Running time: 108 minutes

Original release
- Network: Showtime
- Release: 2003

Coast to Coast is 2003 American-Canadian made-for-television drama film starring Richard Dreyfuss, Judy Davis, and Selma Blair, and directed by Paul Mazursky. It is based on the 1998 novel by Frederic Raphael, who also wrote film's screenplay.

== Plot ==
Barnaby and Maxine Pierce are a middle-aged couple exploring the ups and downs of a marriage that has spun out of control. They have decided to divorce, but take one last cross country road trip from Connecticut to Los Angeles to attend the wedding of their son and give him their vintage Thunderbird as a gift. By reflecting on the life they've shared together, the couple begins to re-evaluate their marriage and discover the possibility of rekindling their relationship.

== Cast ==
- Richard Dreyfuss as Barnaby Pierce
- Judy Davis as Maxine Pierce
- Selma Blair as Stacey Pierce
- David Julian Hirsh as Benjamin Pierce
- Kate Lynch as Nessle Carroway
- Paul Mazursky as Stanly Tarto
- Saul Rubinek as Gary Pereira
- John Salley as Clifford Wordsworth
- Maximilian Schell as Casimir
- Fred Ward as Hal Kressler

== Reception ==
Today praised Richard Dreyfuss's performance, and described the film as "often funny, more often bittersweet. Familiar yet unpredictable. And refreshingly adult." The New York Times gave the film a positive review, calling it "very engaging".

== Award nominations ==
Year	Award	Result	Category	Recipient
2005	American Cinema Editors	Nominated	Best Edited Miniseries or Motion Picture for Non-Commercial Television	Richard Halsey
