= The Pickle =

- Film poster
- Directed by: Paul Mazursky
- Written by: Paul Mazursky
- Produced by: Paul Mazursky
- Starring: Danny Aiello; Dyan Cannon; Clotilde Courau; Shelley Winters; Barry Miller; Jerry Stiller; Chris Penn; Ally Sheedy
- Cinematography: Fred Murphy
- Edited by: Stuart H. Pappé
- Music by: Michel Legrand
- Distributed by: Columbia Pictures
- Release date: 30 April 1993 (USA)
- Running time: 103 minutes
- Country: United States
- Language: English
- Box office: $84,471 (USA)

The Pickle is a 1993 American comedy film produced, written, and directed by Paul Mazursky, telling the story of a formerly powerful film director whose recent string of flops has forced him to make a commercial piece that is artistically uninspired. The absurdity of the film within the film satirizes big-budget Hollywood pictures, while the rest of the story serves as a character study of fictitious film director Harry Stone.

== Plot ==
Harry Stone is an NYC film director who has been living in Paris, France for the past ten years. Despite the fact that he still has a loyal fan base, his last three films were flops, and he returns to New York to hear a pitch from a studio executive. The movie turns out to be The Pickle, a science fiction film with an absurd storyline, but when the executive offers him "a ton of money," Harry immediately sells out his better judgment and agrees to direct the picture.

Aside from a few flashbacks to Harry's childhood, and to the events leading up to the making of The Pickle, most of the story takes place on the day of the new film's premiere. Harry is reunited with his agent, publicist, son, daughter, mother, and ex-wives (both of whom are still on good terms with Harry), and the movie explores these relationships in various combinations; Harry's Parisian girlfriend also plays a major role. Despite Harry's stress about the upcoming premiere—he regrets selling out to make The Pickle, and fears that it will ruin his career—the director spends time to enjoy the people in his life.

=== Harry's career ===
Dialogue establishes several details about Harry's career: His biggest success was a Western called Blue Sands; his most recent film, Paradise Jack, was a hit with his fans, but trashed by the critics and a disappointment at the box office. Harry had ambitions to make cinematic adaptations of Anna Karenina and Huckleberry Finn, but funding fell through after the box office disappointment of Paradise Jack. His dream project is to direct an epic about Cortez and Montezuma starring Dustin Hoffman (despite his admission that Hoffman is too old for either role), but he angrily balks when a studio executive suggests updating the story to a present-day L.A. barrio. The success of The Pickle leads the executive to greenlight the Cortez/Montezuma film, but Harry instead pitches a drama with a storyline loosely mirroring the events of his own return to New York.

=== The Movie Within the Movie ===
The movie featured within the movie—also called The Pickle—involves a group of farmers who grow a pickle to gigantic proportions and convert it into a spaceship, which they fly into outer space. They land on a planet nearly identical to Earth, where one of the farmers (played by Ally Sheedy) develops a romance with an advisor to the President of the United States. (The President is played by Little Richard as himself, and performs an impromptu rendition of "Good Golly, Miss Molly".) The romance is ended when Sheedy decides that, as a vegetarian, she cannot live on a planet where all food is made out of flies.

== Cast ==
Actor	Role
Danny Aiello	Harry Stone
Dyan Cannon	Ellen Stone
Clotilde Courau	Françoise
Shelley Winters	Yetta
Barry Miller	Ronnie
Jerry Stiller	Phil Hirsch
Chris Penn	Gregory Stone
Little Richard	Pres
Stephen Tobolowsky	Mike Krakower
Ally Sheedy	Molly girl
Spalding Gray	Doctor
Robert Cicchini	Electronics Store Clerk

== Critical reception ==
On review aggregator website Rotten Tomatoes The Pickle holds an approval rating of 20% based on 5 reviews, with an average rating of 4.4/10.

Janet Maslin of The New York Times:

Eventually, The Pickle goes overboard in allowing Harry to make a sentimental tape recording meant for all of them. But Mr. Mazursky, a seasoned observer with a wry and generous outlook, does sustain his truly gentle touch... The film is best when it curbs its sentiment and manages to stay droll.

Roger Ebert of the Chicago Sun-Times gave the film 2 stars out of 4 on his rating scale:

...the movie keeps shifting uneasily between tragedy and farce. It wants us to take it seriously - but not too seriously. It leads us to a moment of truth, and then breaks the spell with a punchline... What we get instead is an undigested lump of unfinished ideas.

The film was a box-office failure, and Mazursky never directed a film based on his own screenplay again.
