= Sin With Sebastian =

Sin with Sebastian
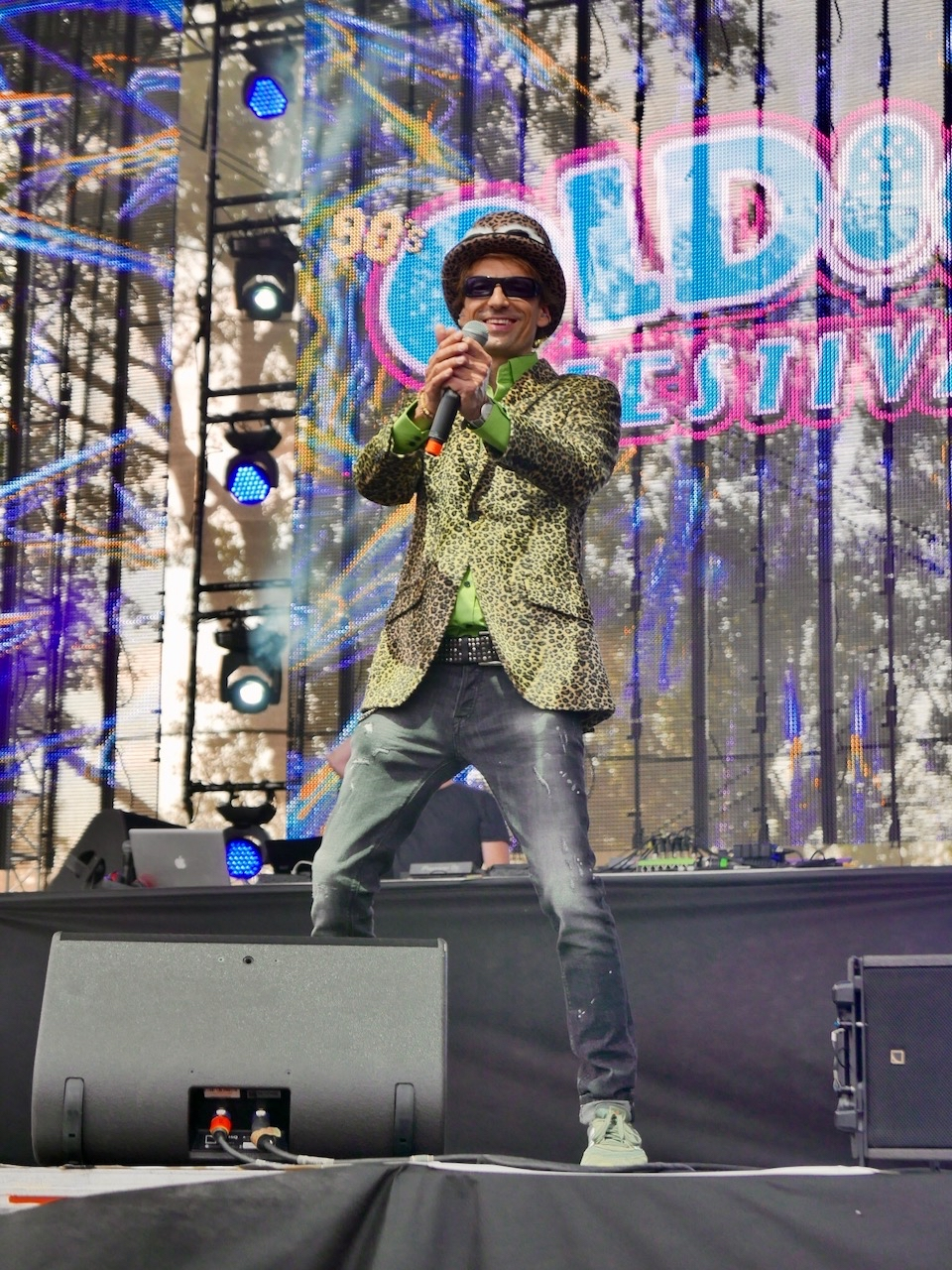

Background information
- Born: Sebastian Roth; 20 September 1971 (age 54)
- Origin: Neustadt an der Weinstraße, Germany
- Genres: Eurodance
- Occupations: Singer, songwriter
- Years active: 1992–present
- Labels: Sing Sing, Lipstick Confusion Records

Sebastian Roth (born 20 September 1971), known by his stage name as Sin With Sebastian, is a German musician/singer/songwriter. Sin With Sebastian came to prominence in 1995 with the Europe-wide hit "Shut Up (and Sleep with Me)", which made it up to number-one in Spain, Austria, Finland, Mexico, and Top 10 in most European countries. In addition, it reached number 26 on the U.S. Billboard Hot Dance Club Play chart and number 44 in the UK Singles Chart. The single and following album, Golden Boy, were co-produced by Inga Humpe and Sebastian Roth.

== Musical career ==
Sin with Sebastian released three singles and one album between 1995 and 1997. Sin with Sebastian reappeared in 2007 with a new line-up, adding guitarist Tom Steinbrecher, to release two singles: "Fuck You (I am in Love)" and "That's all? I'm not satisfied".

== Awards and nominations ==
Year	Awards	Work	Category	Result
1995	MTV Europe Music Awards	Himself	Best Dance	Nominated
1996	ECHO Awards	Himself	Best National Dance Act	Nominated

== Discography ==
=== Albums ===
- Golden Boy (1995)
- The Unreleased Album (demo recordings 1997) (1997)
- Punk Pop! EP (2008)
- Punk POP! 2 EP (2010)

=== Singles ===
- "Shut Up (and Sleep with Me)" (1995)
- "Golden Boy" (1995)
- "He Belongs to Me" (1997) (with Marianne Rosenberg)
- "Fuck You (I Am in Love)" (2007)
- "That's All? (I'm Not Satisfied)" (2010)
- "Wake Up" (2011) (with Dolly Buster)
- "Put It On (Come On) Festival Radio Edit" (2019)
