= Bangaru Babu =

Bangaru Babu (lit. 'Golden Boy' in Telugu) may refer to these Indian films:

- Bangaru Babu (2009 film), a film starring Jagapati Babu
- Bangaru Babu (1973 film), a film starring Akkineni Nageswara Rao

== See also ==
- Golden Boy (disambiguation)
