= The Manual =

1988 nonfiction book by Jimmy Cauty and Bill Drummond

The Manual...
- Author: Jimmy Cauty and Bill Drummond as The Timelords
- Publisher: KLF Publications
- Publication date: 1988
- Publication place: United Kingdom
- ISBN: 0-86359-616-9
- OCLC: 20097625

The Manual (How to Have a Number One the Easy Way) is a 1988 book by "The Timelords" (Jimmy Cauty and Bill Drummond), better known as The KLF. It is a tongue-in-cheek step-by-step guide to achieving a No. 1 single with no money or musical skills, and a case study of the duo's UK novelty pop No. 1 "Doctorin' the Tardis".

== How to have a number one ==
The advice dispensed by The Manual includes: "Firstly, you must be skint and on the dole. Anybody with a proper job or tied up with full time education will not have the time to devote to see it through... Being on the dole gives you a clearer perspective on how much of society is run... having no money sharpens the wits. Forces you never to make the wrong decision. There is no safety net to catch you when you fall." and "If you are already a musician stop playing your instrument. Even better, sell the junk." The book also foretells its own imminent irrelevance, The Timelords admitting that they are writing "a book that will be completely redundant within twelve months. An obsolete artefact. Its only use being a bit of a social history that records the aspirations of a certain strata in British society in the late eighties..."

The book was prophetic about recording technology: "It's obvious that in a very short space of time the Japanese will have delivered the technology and then brought the price of it down so that you can do the whole thing at home. Then you will be able to sod off all that crap about going into studios."

Bill Drummond explained his motivations in an interview: "It was an excuse to say a lot of things I wanted to say about how the industry worked. It was an excuse to go out and say to people all they can say to themselves: If you want to do something, go and do it! Don't wait to be asked, don't wait for a record company to come and want to sign you or a management company. Just go and do it. Also, it was saying: If you wanna have number one...you can have it. It won't make you rich, it won't make you happy, but you can have it."

== Influence and reach ==
The English-language version of The Manual has had at least 3 print runs, being reissued in 1989 and, with a new foreword by Drummond, in 1998. The book has also been translated into German, and was released as an audiobook (read by Bela B., drummer of the punk band Die Ärzte) in Germany in 2003, with Drummond voicing the foreword, a motivational piece about reaching out for one's dreams today as ‘tomorrow is always too late’. In 2010, the book was published in Czech.

The Austrian dance music band Edelweiss took the book as a primary influence: they read the book, borrowed ABBA's "SOS", and sold five million copies worldwide with "Bring Me Edelweiss". It also proved to be an influence on 2000s British girl group The Pipettes who formed after reading the book in order to explore "the idea of being a pop machine."

Jamie Reynolds of Klaxons admitted in an interview to reading The Manual and stated that he "took direct instructions from it.... Get yourself a studio, get a groove going, sing some absolute nonsense over the top, put a breakbeat behind it, and you're away! That's what I did! That's genuinely it. I read that, I noted down the golden rules of pop, and applied that to what we're doing and made sure that that always applies to everything we do. That way, we always come out with a sort of catchy hit number."

== Editions ==
- ISBN 0-86359-616-9 (1988)
- ISBN 1-872013-00-7 (1989)
- ISBN 1-899858-65-2 (1998)
- ISBN 3-931126-22-6 (German version, 1998)
- ISBN 978-80-254-6529-5 (Czech version, 2010)
- ISBN 979-81-935-0125-1 (The Graphic Novel, 2026)
- Downloadable version on the Internet Archive

An audiobook in German language was released in 2003.
