= Golden Boys =

Golden Boys or The Golden Boys may refer to:

- Golden Boys (band), a Brazilian rock group founded in 1958
- Golden Boys (novel), a 2014 novel by Sonya Hartnett
- The Golden Boys, a 2009 American romantic comedy film
- Boulton, Watt and Murdoch, a statue of Matthew Boulton, James Watt, and William Murdoch in Birmingham, England, nicknamed The Golden Boys
- Watford F.C., Watford Football Club, nicknamed "The Golden Boys"
- Golden Boys, a touring act comprising Frankie Avalon, Bobby Rydell, and Fabian Forte
- "Golden Boys", a 2001 song by Res from How I Do

== See also ==
- Golden Boy (disambiguation)
