= Yippee =

2006 documentary film by Paul Mazursky

- Movie poster
- Directed by: Paul Mazursky
- Produced by: Milton Kim; Paul Mazursky
- Starring: Paul Mazursky
- Cinematography: Bill Megalos
- Edited by: Jeff Kanew
- Music by: Walter Werzowa
- Production company: National Center for Jewish Film (NCJF)
- Release date: 2006
- Running time: 74 minutes
- Country: United States
- Language: English

Yippee, also known as Yippee: A Journey to Jewish Joy, is a 2006 American documentary film directed by and starring Paul Mazursky. The film follows Mazursky's journey to a small town in Ukraine, to witness and participate in a three-day festival of over 25,000 singing, dancing and praying Hasidic Jews. It was Mazursky's only documentary.

Yippee made its North American debut at the 2007 Palm Springs International Film Festival.
