= Golden Girls (girl group) =

South Korean senior girl group

- Origin: Seoul, South Korea
- Genres: K-pop; dance-pop
- Years active: 2023–2025
- Label: JYP
- Members: Insooni; Park Mi-kyung; Shin Hyo-bum; Lee Eun-mi

Golden Girls (Korean: 골든걸스) is a South Korean senior girl group formed by JYP Entertainment. The group debuted on the reality program of the same name in December 2023 with the single "One Last Time" and four members: Insooni, Park Mi-kyung, Shin Hyo-bum, and Lee Eun-mi.

== Discography ==
=== Singles ===
- ”One Last Time” (2023)
