= Amicus Poloniae =

Amicus Poloniae (Latin: "Friend of Poland") is a distinction, established in 1996 by the Polish ambassador to the United States and conferred annually to the citizens of the United States for merits in the field of Polish-American relations, especially in the popularization of achievements of Polish culture, sciences and the promotion of Poland in the United States.

Together with the distinction the laureate receives a plaque made from cherry wood and adorned with a brass White Eagle – the Coat of arms of Poland - and an engraved plate with the name of the laureate.

== Laureates ==
- 1996 Alan Pally - New York, NY, New York Public Library for the Performing Arts, Lincoln Center
- 1996 Stefan & Wanda Wilk – Los Angeles, California, Polish Music Center, University of Southern California
- 1997 Ellen K. Lee – La Senda, California, Helena Modrzejewska Foundation, California
- 1998 Paulina Babinski – Denver, Colorado, American Council of Polish Culture in Denver
- 1999 Joshua Siegel – New York, NY, Department of Film and Video Museum of Modern Art., New York
- 2000 Paul Mazursky – Beverly Hills, California, Actor, film director; Kevin Mulroy, Los Angeles, California, Research Director, Autry Museum of the American West
- 2001 Hanna Saxon – Miami, Florida, Chopin Foundation of the United States
- 2002 George E. Pataki – governor of New York State
- 2003 Richard Farwell – Executive Director of Vizcaya Museum and Gardens
- 2004 Frank Barnyak – President of the Navy League of the United States (Los Angeles)
- 2005 Anna M. Cienciala – Professor of History and Russian and Eastern European Studies, University of Kansas
- 2006 Salme Harju Steinberg – President of Northeastern Illinois University
- 2007 David Lynch – cinema director
- 2007 Clay Bullwinkel - Silicon Valley businessman and mentor of Poland-based technology companies
- 2008
  - Yola Czaderska-Hayek, journalist
  - Mahendra Patel – Chief Executive Officer, Hope Medical Institute
- 2009 Jane Kaczmarek – actress graduated from the University of Wisconsin and the Yale School of Drama.
- 2010 Wojciech Kielak – Former president of the Polish American Congress in Nebraska and a commanding officer in Gen. Maczek's Division on the Western European Front
- 2012 Paula Freer – Director of International Government Relations for Marathon Oil Corporation
- 2013 Teresa Lowenthal, Paul Lowenthal – American Institute of Polish Culture, Miami, Florida
- 2014 Bruce Rauner – governor of Illinois
- 2015 Georgetown University Press
- 2017
  - Stephen J Schneider, American Lawyer and Vice President and Director of International Affairs at AIPAC, Washington, DC.
  - Zbigniew Kantorosinski – Chief of the Germanic and Slavic Division, Library of Congress
- 2018 Stephanie Kraft, journalist, translator
- 2019
  - Normal Kelker - microbiologist and historian, Polish Institute of Arts and Sciences
  - Joann Falleta, Music Director, Buffalo Philharmonic Orchestra, New York
  - Stan Breckenridge- Musician, vocalist and pianist, author, academician, Fulbright Scholar alumni, first American to be honored with the Polish Independence Centennial Ring
- 2020 Neal Pease, Professor of History, University of Wisconsin-Milwaukee
- 2021 John Dunn - Professor of History, Valdosta State University, Georgia
- 2022 David Strathairn, actor, Clark Young, script writer, Derek Golden, writer, "Remember this. The lesson of Jan Karski," theatrical production.
- 2023 Rick Huard - Editor in Chief, Ohio University Press
