= Standing Shiva (?) =

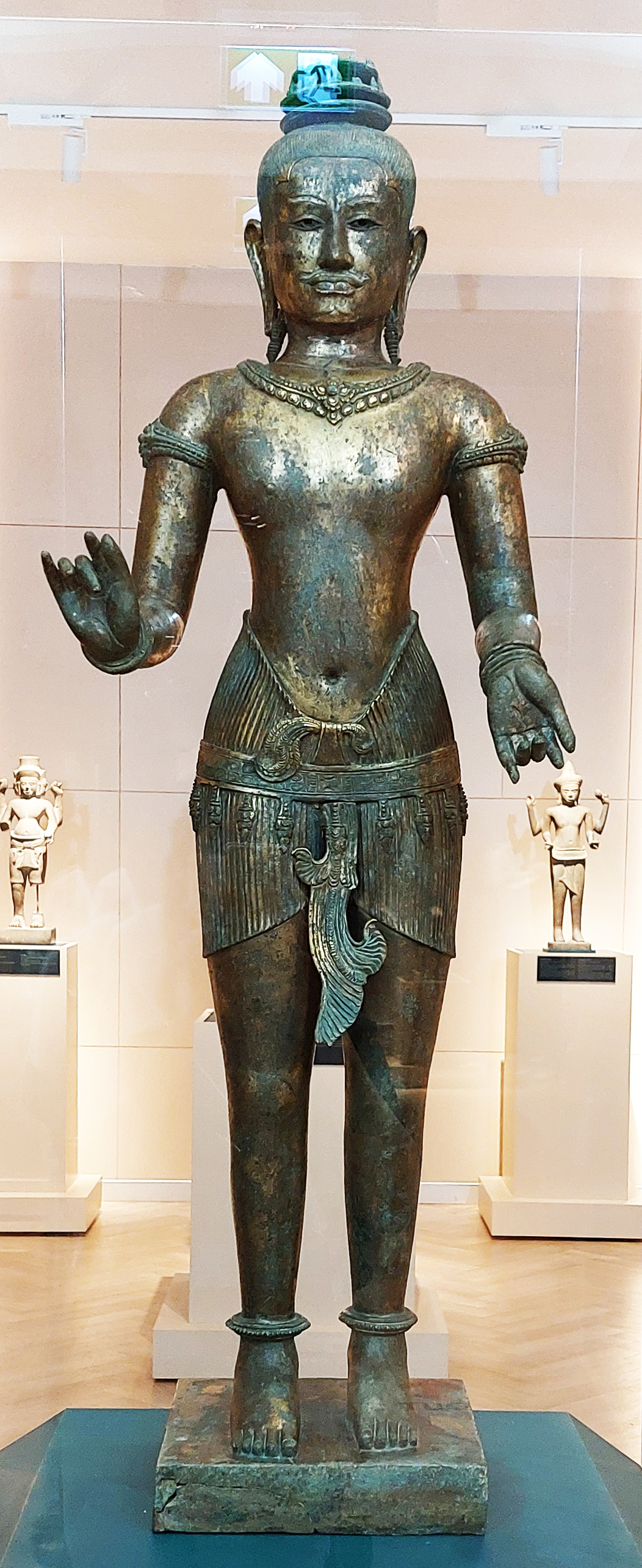
- Golden Boy on display at the Bangkok National Museum
- Material: Gilded bronze
- Height: 130 cm (51 in)
- Present location: Bangkok National Museum, Thailand

Standing Shiva, commonly referred to in the media as Golden Boy, is an 11th-century Khmer gilded-bronze sculpture from the Angkor period. The statue, believed to have been removed from Thailand in the 1970s, was later acquired by the Metropolitan Museum of Art in New York and repatriated in December 2023.

== Description ==
The Khmer statue, according to the Metropolitan Museum of Art, is "the most complete extant gilded-bronze image from Angkor." The “naturalism,” jewels, and elaborate sampot suggests the figure may have "served a dual purpose: representing a cult icon for worship in a royal sanctuary and also acting as an ancestor image of a deceased ruler". Martin Lerner, who served as Curator of Indian and Southeast Asian Art at the Metropolitan Museum of Art from 1972 to 2003, wrote in 1989 that the statue probably depicts a "devaraja", a deified monarch, "perhaps the Khmer king Jayavarman VI." The sculpture was donated to the museum in 1988 by art collector Walter H. Annenberg, who had acquired it from Spink & Son Ltd. in London by that year. The statue is believed to have been smuggled out of Thailand by antiquities dealer Douglas Latchford in the mid-1970s. The sculpture sustained damage during the looting.

== Claim and repatriation ==
The statue, known as the Golden Boy, was claimed by both the Cambodian government and Thailand. The Metropolitan Museum of Art ultimately repatriated it to Thailand. The restituted items arrived at Suvarnabhumi Airport on 20 May 2024, to be displayed at the Bangkok National Museum. In 2024, the Thai government signed an agreement with the Metropolitan Museum of Art.

== See also ==
- Sripuranthan Natarajan Idol
- Archaeological looting
- Art theft
