= Golden Boy (Sin with Sebastian album) =

Studio album by Sin With Sebastian
- Released: 1995
- Recorded: 1995
- Genre: Eurodance, dance-pop
- Length: 46:50
- Label: Sing Sing

Sin With Sebastian chronology
Golden Boy (1995)	Punk Pop! EP (2008)

Singles from Golden Boy
- 1. "Shut Up (and Sleep with Me)" Released: 1 May 1995; 2. "Golden Boy" Released: October 1995; 3. "He Belongs to Me" Released: 1997

Golden Boy is the debut album by Sin With Sebastian, a moniker used by the German musician/songwriter Sebastian Roth. The Eurodance album contained the international hits "Shut Up (and Sleep with Me)", "He Belongs to Me" and the title track "Golden Boy"

== Track listing ==
1. "Shut Up (and Sleep with Me)" (Airplay Mix) 3:43
2. "Put It On" 3:28 additional Vocals by Carmelina
3. "Golden Boy" (Airplay Mix) 3:47
4. "He Belongs to Me" 3:41 additional Vocals Marianne Rosenberg, [Female Choir] – Annette Humpe, Inga Humpe, Luci van Org
5. "Jungle of Love" 4:24 additional Vocals by Carmelina
6. "Birthday Baby" (Tokio Version) 3:13 additional Vocals by Carmelina
7. "Don't Go Away" 3:44 additional Vocals by Jevon
8. "When Things Go Wrong" 4:47 additional Vocals by Axel Christallo
9. "I'll Wait for You" (Live) 4:44 additional Vocals by Steve
10. "Right or Wrong" 3:48 Cello by Lucia Woydak and Piano by Chris-Fun-Deylen
11. "The Journey Ends" (Reprise) 6:01
12. "Shut Up (and Sleep with Me)" (George Morel Remix (Encore)) 7:17 Remix, Producer George Morel
