= Golden Boy (Anikushin) =

Sculpture by Mikhail Anikushin

- Artist: Mikhail Anikushin
- Type: Sculpture
- Medium: Plaster
- Dimensions: 98.5 cm (38.8 in)
- Location: The State Museum of City Sculpture, Saint Petersburg

Golden Boy (Russian: Золотой мальчик) is a sculpture created by Mikhail Anikushin, a celebrated Soviet sculptor honored with the titles People's Artist of the USSR and recipient of both the Lenin Prize and I. E. Repin State Prizes of the RSFSR. The work was conceived as part of the larger Memorial to the Heroic Defenders of Leningrad, dedicated to those who endured the siege of the city during World War II. The memorial itself was unveiled in 1975 in Leningrad (now Saint Petersburg) and was designed by architects Valentin Kamensky and Sergei Speransky. The model for the sculpture was Anikushin's own grandson, Adrian Anikushin.

Both existing versions of Golden Boy were executed in bronze and covered with gold leaf, and were lost. The Mikhail Anikushin Workshop, a branch of the State Museum of City Sculpture, displays a plaster model of the sculpture.

== Sculpture ==
The sculpture is part of the collection of the State Museum of Urban Sculpture in St. Petersburg and is displayed in the permanent exhibition of the Mikhail Anikushin Workshop, a branch of the museum. It is exhibited in the hall dedicated to the creation of the monument To the Heroic Defenders of Leningrad. The sculpture measures 98.5 cm in height and 30 cm in width, with the inventory number NVF-98. In the exhibition summary, it is titled Golden Boy. 1975.

The work is a plaster model of a now-lost bronze sculpture originally covered with gold leaf. Metal frame elements are visible beneath the plaster on the backs of both hands. The sculpture depicts a completely nude boy, approximately 5–6 years old, with his head slightly raised and eyes gazing forward. His right foot is planted, while the left is extended forward with toes spread, suggesting movement. The figure stands on a small round pedestal, bearing the inscription "1975. M. Anikushin," scratched into the wet plaster behind the feet. The boy's arms are raised in front of his abdomen, slightly away from the body, with elbows bent and positioned behind him.

== Sculpture’s history ==
=== Mikhail Anikushin's plan ===
Elena Litovchenko, corresponding member of the Russian Academy of Arts, noted that Mikhail Anikushin “suffered from the impossibility of speaking sincerely about the tragedy of Leningrad”. His concept for the Monument to the Heroic Defenders of Leningrad aimed to combine tragic, solemn, and lyrical elements, emphasizing sincerity and symbolism over pathos and conventional realism. Anikushin described the memorial’s “sincerity and individuality” as a protest against generalized monumentality. Known for constant improvisation, he sought to imbue the ensemble with emotional depth.

The composition of the memorial is divided into three parts: a staircase with sculptural groups and an obelisk, an open-air hall in the form of a broken ring, and an underground memorial museum. (Note: See the external images.) According to the author's plan, the tour of the memorial complex should begin at the staircase. The contrast between the dynamic sculptures and the balanced, static architectural structure imbues the staircase ensemble with “excitement and spirituality”. Currently, the composition of the staircase includes 26 figures facing the front line during the blockade. (Note: Including 2 figures at the stele and 6 characters of the Blockade group, there are 34 of them in all compositions of the memorial.) Another figure was created as a plaster model and later cast in metal in accordance with the sculptor's original vision.

External images
- | A variant of the project published in the magazine Construction and Architecture of Leningrad (1973, No. 9)
- | Variant of the project. The first half of the 1970s. Photo of the layout from the personal archive of V. S. Speranskaya

Mikhail Anikushin wrote in his diary about the work on the Golden Boy:

There were three projects for the monument. In the second project, I thought for a long time about what to place at the center of the composition. And suddenly, I realized: the symbol was found! It is the a small child figure — his striving for life should connect all these big and courageous people. We fought not for glory; we fought for life. And the child, for me, symbolizes this invincible life. But they wouldn’t let me. I cried for a week [...].The third one was approved.

Art historian Alexander Zamoshkin noted that the early memorial mockups featured 15 cm figures, allowing full visualization of the composition. (Note: Sources claim that in the very first version of the monument there was only one figure. For example, Lyubov Slavova, a senior researcher at the State Russian Museum, wrote that Anikushin's idea was initially limited to a single female figure.) At the 1972 exhibition, Golden Boy stood at the edge of the elliptical site, symbolizing renewal and peace. Other groups portrayed the suffering and resilience of Leningraders. The final design, shaped by public feedback, was more monumental. A central Victory statue, inspired by classical heroism, was later replaced with The Winners, a more concrete representation of Leningrad's defenders. The child figure was initially retained but no longer appeared in later versions of the composition.

Elena Lezik, director of the State Memorial Museum of the Defense and Siege of Leningrad, wrote that the earliest version placed the boy directly on the ground, representing the human cost of war. She confirmed that this model was displayed at the State Russian Museum as early as May 1972. Art historian Igor Bartenev described an alternate version featuring a mother lifting the child atop the obelisk, symbolizing future generations.

Journalist Yuri Trefilov, a close associate of Anikushin, recounted that Golden Boy emerged during the final design phase. Initially intended to crown the 48-meter obelisk, the figure was repositioned at the top step of the staircase at the suggestion of Leningrad party leader Grigory Romanov. Romanov interpreted the boy as a symbol of life for whom the heroes had fought — with the statues Soldier and Worker standing protectively behind.

Two versions of the sculpture were cast in metal and gilded to the highest standards. The broader monument was executed in dark red granite from Vyborg and Priozersk, and patinated bronze, creating a solemn, traditional palette in line with Leningrad’s commemorative architecture. (Note: In the book on the work of Mikhail Anikushin by the candidates of historical sciences Remma Mikhailova and Anta Zhuravlevova, it is stated that red granite (with quartz and feldspar) was extracted from the Borodino deposit near Vyborg and used to make the obelisks and pedestals of all the sculptural groups, except for the Blockade, for which black granite with blue sparkle from Ukraine was used.)

=== Model ===
Mikhail Anikushin's grandson, Adrian, claimed to be the prototype for the Golden Boy sculpture. (Note: Adrian Anikushin was born in 1969, and his age at the time of the memorial's unveiling was indeed the same as that of the Golden Boy.) However, he offered a different interpretation of its placement within the memorial’s overall design. Adrian noted that instead of the boy being centrally located, a large obelisk had been placed there, which obscured the child's significance. He believed the boy should have stood behind the Soldier and Worker sculptures, where the stele was, symbolizing life returning to the city after the war. Adrian further explained that the child represented vitality and rebirth, intended to descend the stairs as a living symbol of the city’s resurgence.

Adrian's view aligns with a passage from Anikushin's article Pain and Courage, published in the May 1975 issue of Avrora magazine before the memorial’s official opening. Anikushin described his inspiration for the Golden Boy:

I spent a long time thinking about what to put in the center of the composition. Once, while I was working on the monument, my five-year-old grandson Adriyashka came running to the studio. Suddenly, it became clear to me: I found the symbol! It was a figure of a small child, his tiny life, which should connect all these great and courageous people. The Nazi officers urged their soldiers: "Destroy, crush, hack for the glory of the Fuhrer — and let your conscience be clear [...]" We weren't fighting for glory, we were fighting for the life. And for me, the child symbolizes this invincible life.

Soviet poet Vsevolod Azarov recalled a moment when he and Anikushin were discussing the first draft of the memorial in the artist's studio. During the conversation, Anikushin's grandson, in light, quick steps, ran into the room. Azarov jokingly asked if the central child figure was inspired by the boy, to which Anikushin simply smiled.

=== Destination ===
Journalist Yuri Trefilov, a close associate of Mikhail Anikushin and familiar with the planning of the Monument to the Heroic Defenders of Leningrad, believed that Grigory Romanov, then First Secretary of the Leningrad Regional Committee, reversed his decision to include the Golden Boy sculpture at the last moment. According to Trefilov, Romanov, preparing for a promotion to Moscow, was unwilling to risk his political career over an ideologically sensitive artistic choice. The figure of a nude child at the forefront of a World War II memorial could have been seen as controversial, especially with Mikhail Suslov, Secretary of the CPSU Central Committee and ideological overseer, scheduled to attend the opening. Known for his strict moral views, Suslov might have disapproved of the sculpture’s prominence and form.

Trefilov noted that the Golden Boy, only 1.5 meters tall and without a pedestal, stood at eye level, making it easily accessible to viewers and visually distinct from the larger, 3.5-meter figures of the composition. Its shining, idealized form contrasted sharply with the emaciated, solemn figures representing the Blockade within the inner memorial ring. According to Trefilov, the local Party organization advised delaying the sculpture’s installation with vague promises to resolve the matter after the unveiling. Ultimately, the sculpture was never installed, and its whereabouts remain unknown. Anikushin’s student, Vladimir Gorevoi, recalled that after the memorial’s opening, one of the two bronze versions of the Golden Boy was returned to the sculptor’s studio, though its fate remains unclear

Anikushin was unaware of the decision to exclude the sculpture. On the day of the opening, May 4, 1975, he believed the Golden Boy would be delivered in time for the ceremony. (Note: Vadim Bass, Andrei Gusarov, and others have dated the memorial's official opening to the public to May 9, 1975.) He repeatedly tried to contact the director of the Monument Sculpture factory from his nearby hotel but was told the director was away seeking clarification from Party officials. Eventually, Anikushin went to the factory himself and found the director, V. P. Stepanov. According to Trefilov, in a scene he personally witnessed, the enraged sculptor chased Stepanov around a table until the latter confessed that Romanov had ordered the sculpture not be erected. Anikushin rarely spoke of the incident afterward, and the story became widely known only posthumously. Trefilov’s account is supported by art historian Nina Veselitskaya-Ignatius, whose article in the May 1975 issue of Tvorchestvo does not mention the Golden Boy. However, an illustration accompanying the text clearly shows the child’s figure as part of the original composition.

Architectural historian Vadim Bass confirmed that the Golden Boy remained part of the design until shortly before the opening. He viewed the figure as a symbol of the future for which wartime sacrifices were made. Versions of the project including the boy were publicly exhibited and submitted to city authorities, with contracts signed for execution. (Note: Vadim Bass noted that some authors could hardly write. In many letters, participation in the collection of funds for the memorial or a stay in besieged Leningrad during the war years served as justification for the right to present their concept of the memorial or to criticise already existing projects.) The final composition, however, was not determined until the last moment. Anikushin approved the working model of the Golden Boy only on March 3, 1975, two months before completion of the ensemble. The sculpture also appeared in the 1973 issue of Construction and Architecture of Leningrad, which featured published drawings clearly showing the boy on the staircase.

In 2017, the Golden Boy was exhibited in St. Petersburg during the Sculptor Anikushin exhibition commemorating the 100th anniversary of his birth. Earlier, Anikushin’s sketches for the sculpture were displayed at a 1988 exhibition in Leningrad.

== Reviews ==
Several critics, historians, and artists have commented on the significance of Golden Boy within Mikhail Anikushin's vision for the Monument to the Heroic Defenders of Leningrad. Writer and publicist Viktor Ganshin described the sculpture as a child reaching for light, standing atop a 30-meter pedestal that supported a 15-meter statue of Victory. He interpreted the boy as a symbol of “joy and hope of future generations, their unbreakable chain,” and quoted Anikushin, who envisioned the sculpture as a warning to future soldiers: “Our grandchildren were born in peaceful times; we must ensure our experience does not ruin their lives".

Journalist and writer Viktor Senin called the Golden Boy "a poetic resolution of the concept" of the entire memorial. Senin wrote that "the boy connects each composition of the monument with invisible threads". He saw in the sculpture "a symbol of the invincibility of life".

Nikolai Malakhov, a philosopher and art theorist, wrote that the sculpture symbolized the preserved life of Leningrad’s youth. (Note: Presumably, Nikolai Malakhov relied on his knowledge of the project in describing the memorial, so he did not know that the Golden Boy was missing from the realized version.) He emphasized that Anikushin’s work avoided excessive allegory, maintaining a balance between artistic expression and psychological depth. He saw in the Golden Boy a lyrical quality imbued with social meaning.

Art historian Igor Bartenev detailed the technical process of the sculpture’s creation. Based on Anikushin’s sketches, workers constructed a wooden frame, later modeled in clay and plaster before being cast in bronze. Anikushin and his students, including V. Azemsha and V. Gorevoi, were involved in the modeling. Bartenev also published photographs showing the sculpture placed in different potential positions within the memorial, including at the top of the staircase and in front of a wide semicircular stele.

Writer Daniil Granin viewed the Golden Boy as central to Anikushin’s original concept. In his memoir Memory Quirks, he described the child as the embodiment of victory toward whom the suffering citizens of the Blockade moved — “a beautiful metaphor, a symbol of the siege epic. Granin criticized the removal of the figure, arguing that without it, the monument lost its soul and became hollow, shaped by political interference rather than artistic intent.

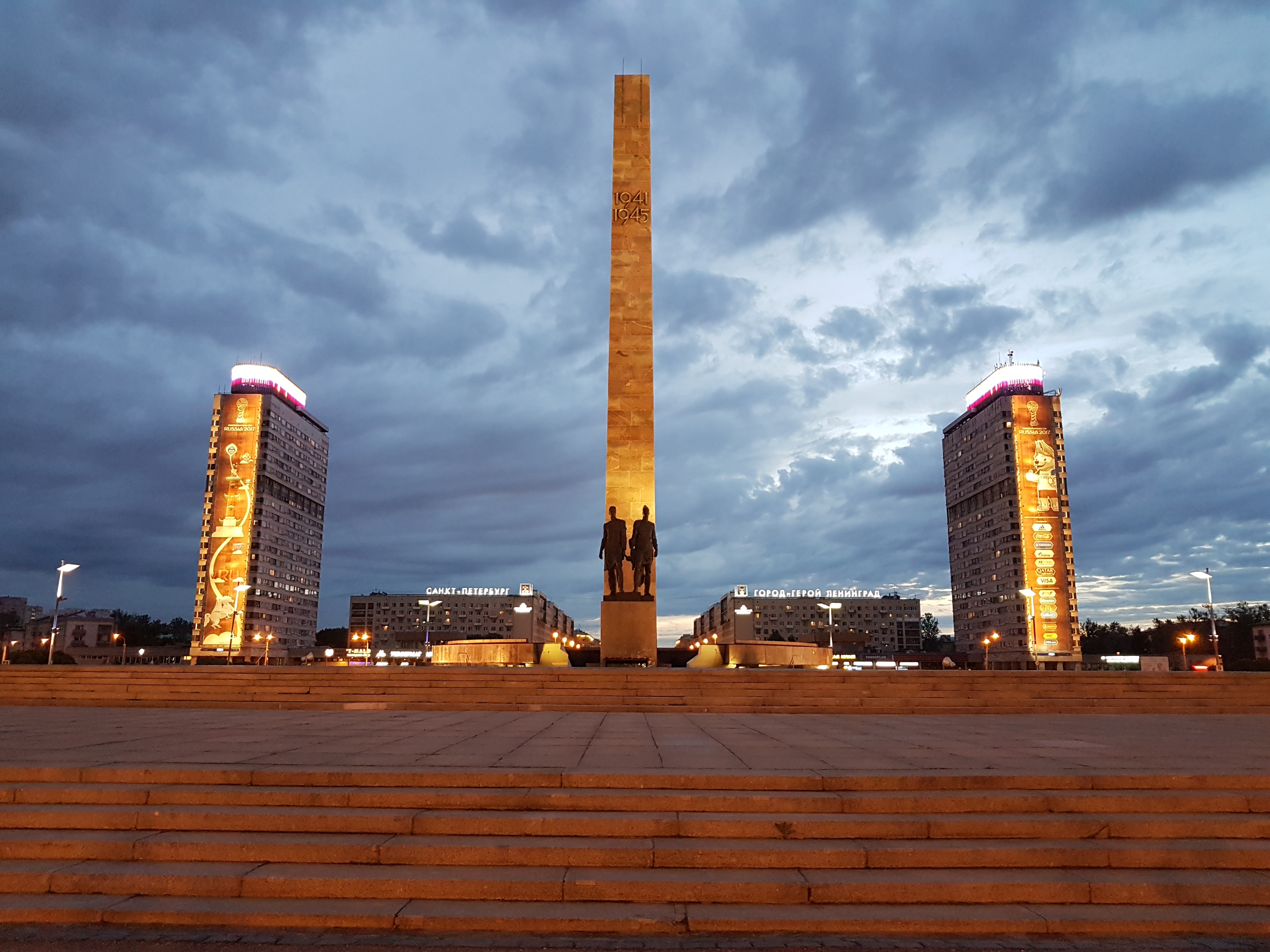
Monument to the heroic defenders of Leningrad. In the foreground (top step of the second staircase from the viewer) is the place intended for the Golden Boy.

The sculptor Grigory Yastrebenetsky considered the child’s absence a major flaw in the final composition. He believed the boy was the visual and symbolic center of the memorial, representing the future for which the depicted soldiers had fought. In his book The Author's Interview with Himself, Yastrebenetsky acknowledged practical issues with the statue’s scale and placement but concluded that the Golden Boy was the strongest symbol available for the central theme. He criticized the alternative solution — the Soldier and Worker statues — for lacking clear symbolic coherence, arguing that the memorial’s narrative was weakened by this duplication of meaning.

Historian and journalist Tatiana Kutsenina highlighted the symbolic importance of the child in the context of war. She wrote that while young children, like the one depicted in Golden Boy, were not combatants, they suffered equally — enduring hunger, loss, and hardship. In her view, the child's presence among the adult figures emphasized that the monument honored not only the defenders of Leningrad but also the innocent lives caught in the siege.

== Bibliography ==
=== Sources ===
- Anikushin, M. K. (1975). Боль и мужество [Pain and courage] (in Russian). Аврора: Журнал. pp. 18–19.
- Anikushin, M. K. (1997). Боль и мужество (в сокращении) [Pain and Courage (in abridgement)] (in Russian). СПб.: Славия. pp. 7–9.
- Anikushin, M. K. (2017). Несколько слов о себе. Тексты из дневниковых записей М. Аникушина [A few words about myself. Texts from the diary entries of M. Anikushin] (in Russian). СПб.: Петербургское наследие и перспектива. p. 107.
- Granin, D. A. (2017). Памятник Михаила Аникушина // Причуды памяти [Mikhail Anikushin's Monument // Quirks of Memory]. Наш XX век (in Russian). М.: Центрполиграф. p. 510. ISBN 978-5-9950-0273-4.
- Монумент защитникам Ленинграда [Monument to the Defenders of Leningrad] (in Russian). Л.: Ленинградская организация Союза художников РСФСР. 1988.

=== Researches and non-fiction ===
- Azarov, V. (1973). Заветные встречи [Treasured meetings] (in Russian). Советская культура: Газета. p. 6. ISSN 1562-0379.
- Alyansky, Yu. L. (1985). В мастерской на Петроградской стороне [In a workshop on Petrograd side] (in Russian). М.: Советский художник. p. 144.
- Bartenev, I. A. (1980). Вступительная статья // Монумент героическим защитникам Ленинграда в годы Великой Отечественной войны [Introductory article // Monument to the heroic defenders of Leningrad during the World War II] (in Russian). Л.: Художник РСФСР. pp. 1–41.
- Bass, V. G. (2019). Модернистский монумент для классического города [A modernist monument for a classic city] (in Russian). Неприкосновенный запас: Журнал. pp. 61–84. ISSN 1815-7912.
- Veselitskaya-Ignatius, N. V. (1975). Проект памятника героическим защитникам города Ленина [Project of the monument to the heroic defenders of the city of Lenin] (in Russian). Творчество: Журнал. pp. 17–19. ISSN 0039-2413.
- Ganshin, V. (1974). Монумент [The Monument] (in Russian). Литературная Россия: Газета. p. 10. ISSN 1560-6856.
- Gusarov, A. Yu. (2010). Был город-фронт, была блокада // Памятники воинской славы Петербурга [There was a city-front, there was a blockade // Monuments of Military Glory of St. Petersburg] (in Russian). СПб.: Паритет. pp. 133–189. ISBN 978-5-9343-7363-5.
- Zamoshkin, A. I. (1978). Глава седьмая // Михаил Константинович Аникушин [Chapter Seven // Mikhail Konstantinovich Anikushin] (in Russian). Л.: Художник РСФСР. pp. 213–304.
- Kolesova, О. (1973). Подвигу твоему, Ленинград [To your heroic deed, Leningrad] (in Russian). Ленинградская правда: Газета. p. 6.
- Kutsenina, Т. А. (2020). От автора // Дети войны: сборник воспоминаний [The author's words// Children of the war: a collection of memoirs] (in Russian). М.: ОМ-Пресс. pp. 2–3. ISBN 978-5-9063-6320-6.
- Lezik, Е. V. (2000). Монумент героическим защитникам Ленинграда (история создания) // Труды Государственного музея истории Санкт-Петербурга [Monument to the heroic defenders of Leningrad (history of creation) // Proceedings of the State Museum of the History of St. Petersburg] (in Russian). Vol. 5. Материалы к истории блокады Ленинграда. СПб. pp. 270–294.
- Lezik, E. V. (2011). Вступительная статья // Monument to heroic defenders of Leningrad [Introductory article // Monument to heroic defenders of Leningrad] (in Russian). СПб.: Государственный музей истории Санкт-Петербурга. p. 71. ISBN 978-5-9026-7192-3.
- Leonova, N. G. (1999). Памятники истории // Дом в Вяземском переулке. Мастерская скульптора М. К. Аникушина [Monuments of History // House in Vyazemsky Lane. Workshop of sculptor M. K. Anikushin] (in Russian). СПб.: Наука. pp. 103–130. ISBN 978-5-9063-6320-6.
- Litovchenko, E. N. (2008). Вступительная статья // Михаил Константинович Аникушин. 1917—1997. Скульптура [Introductory article // Mikhail Konstantinovich Anikushin. 1917—1997. Sculptur] (in Russian). СПб.: Историческая иллюстрация, Научно-исследовательский музей Российской академии художеств. p. 96. ISBN 978-5-8956-6073-7.
- Malakhov, N. Ya. (1976). Об историческом значении советского изобразительного искусства [On the historical significance of Soviet fine arts]. Проблемы социалистического реализма (in Russian). М.: Изобразительное искусство. p. 248.
- Mikhailova R. F., Zhuravlyova A. A. (1983). "IV. «Подвигу твоему, Ленинград…»". Величию и подвигу человека: документальный рассказ о скульпторе М. К. Аникушкине [To the greatness and feat of a man: a documentary story about the sculptor M. K. Anikushkin] (in Russian). Л.: Лениздат. pp. 93–130.
- Senin, V. (1974). Вернуться герои на площадь Победы [Heroes return to Victory Square] (in Russian). Правда: Газета. p. 6. ISSN 1990-6838.
- Slavova, L. A. (1987). Вступительная статья // Аникушин Михаил Константинович. Cкульптура, рисунок: Каталог выставки [Introductory article // Anikushin Mikhail Konstantinovich. Sculpture, drawing: Exhibition catalog] (in Russian). Л.: Художник РСФСР. p. 31.
- Tolstaya, I. (1979). Монумент в честь героической обороны Ленинграда [Monument in honor of the heroic defense of Leningrad] (in Russian). Архитектура СССР: Журнал. pp. 36–39. ISSN 0004-1939.
- Trefilov, Yu. I. (2010). А был и мальчик среди скульптур на площади Победы [And there was a boy among the sculptures in Victory Square] (in Russian). Санкт-Петербургские ведомости: Газета. pp. 1–2.
- Frolov, V. A. (2000). Монумент наа площади Победы (архитектурно-художественный анализ) // Труды Государственного музея истории Санкт-Петербурга [Monument on Victory Square (architectural and artistic analysis)// Proceedings of the State Museum of the History of St. Petersburg] (in Russian). Vol. 5. Материалы к истории блокады Ленинграда. СПб. pp. 294–324.
- Проект памятника героическим защитникам города Ленина [The monument to the heroic defenders of the city of Lenin project] (in Russian). Строительство и архитектура Ленинграда: Журнал. 1973. pp. 2–3. ISSN 0039-2413.
- Shefov, A. N. (2011). Бессмертный подвиг в бронзе и камне // Скульптор М. К. Аникушин [Immortal feat in bronze and stone // Sculptor M. K. Anikushin] (in Russian). ТОНЧУ. pp. 65–122. ISBN 978-5-9121-5066-1.
- Yastrebenetsky, G. D. (2019). Забытые сюжеты [Forgotten subjects] (PDF) (in Russian). Нева: Журнал. pp. 186–194. ISSN 0130-741X.
- Yastrebenetsky, G. D. (2005). На войне и после // Интервью автора с самим собой [At war and after // Interview of the author with himself] (in Russian). СПб.: Журнал «Нева». p. 320. ISBN 978-5-8751-6081-3.
