= Walter Werzowa =

Austrian composer and record producer

- Born: 15 December 1960 (age 65); Vienna, Austria
- Occupations: composer and music producer
- Notable work: "Intel bong"

Walter Werzowa (born 15 December 1960) is an Austrian-born composer, producer and owner of LA-based music production studio Musikvergnuegen. He is most famous for composing the "Intel bong" jingle and the 1980s hit "Bring Me Edelweiss" as part of the band Edelweiss. Walter Werzowa joined an AI team to co-write Beethoven’s 10th symphony, that premiered October 9, 2021 in Bonn. Robbie Williams heard Walter's Beethoven work and asked to work on Robbie's 2022 Angels remake. He is leading the music department for the immersive Mythos Mozart Experience Vienna. Walter collaborated with Refik Anadol in "Mozart Forever." Walter is heading the Filmmusik department at MDW University of Music and Performing Arts Vienna.

== Biography ==
Walter Werzowa was born in Vienna, Austria, where he studied classical guitar and electronic music at Vienna Musik Hochschule. His collaboration with Otto M. Zykan opened doors for contemporary classical music. Walter moved to the United States of America after Edelweiss disbanded, at which point, he studied film music at the University of Southern California. Werzowa has been featured in various literature and referred to as "the guru of audio branding." He and his wife Evelyne currently reside in Los Angeles with their three children Camille, Julien, and Lucca.

In 2016, Werzowa received his Master of Arts degree from the University of Santa Monica.

== Career ==
Werzowa is well known for having composed and produced the Intel "Bong," which is allegedly broadcast somewhere in the world once every five minutes. Since its conception in 1994, he has re-arranged it to keep it current (e.g. in 2015, when he composed the mashup of the Intel "Bong" mnemonic and Beethoven's 5th Symphony to create "Symphony in Blue", the anthem for Intel's Experience Amazing campaign which premiered during Super Bowl 50).

Musikvergnuegen, Inc.
- Type: Private
- Industry: Sound and music production
- Founded: 1992; 34 years ago
- Founder: Walter Werzowa
- Headquarters: Los Angeles, California, United States
- Number of employees: 11-50 employees
- Website: musikvergnuegen.com

Musikvergnuegen, Inc. (/ˌmjuːzɪkvərɡˈnjuːɡən/), sometimes abbreviated to MusikV, is a music and sound design production company founded by Werzowa, located in Los Angeles, California. The company name translates into English as "enjoyment of music".

Musikvergnuegen specializes in audio branding and has worked on campaigns for Samsung, Delta Air Lines, GM Goodwrench and LG.

Besides audio branding, Werzowa also composes music for feature films. Most recently, he scored the documentary, Author: The JT LeRoy Story, which was written and directed by Jeff Feuerzeig and is the only film on this subject thus far to receive American and European theatrical distribution, it premiered in United States theaters in September 2016. Previously, Werzowa has scored the main themes to Eraser (starring Arnold Schwarzenegger),Taking Lives (starring Angelina Jolie), The Hunted, Yippee and The Devil and Daniel Johnston, which received a Sundance Film Festival award. He also earned a music credit on Steven Spielberg's Minority Report and in 2008 he worked on 8: Person to Person, which was directed by Wim Wenders.

Werzowa also composed the Nova theme, used since "The Viking Deception" (season 32, episode 5 (aired 2005)), replacing the theme composed by Martin Brody and Mason Daring (used since "Pioneers of Surgery: The Brutal Craft", season 15, episode 12, 1988; arranged by Michael Whalen in 1999).

In 2014, Music Beyond, the production music library founded by Werzowa in 2005, was acquired by BMG. Werzowa now serves in a consultant capacity at both BMG and Beyond.

In 2016, Werzowa launched HealthTunes.org, a free music/sound streaming platform that offers academically and scientifically researched Health Music and evidence-based clinical reference.

In 2021, Walter premiered Ludwig van Beethoven's 10 Symphony in Bonn. DTAG. CD released on Modern Records BMG
