= Matthias Schweger =

Austrian director, writer and producer

Matthias Peter Schweger (born 1966) is an Austrian director, writer, and producer for television.

As an entrepreneur, he co-founded and managed the music projects Edelweiss and Bingoboys, as well as music video production companies, and helped launch Germany's first music video channel, VIVA (German TV channel).

== Music career ==
While working for Hitradio Ö3, he met fellow producer Martin Neumayer, and together they created the musical project Edelweiss, a cross-over between Austrian folk music and US hip-hop.

In 1991, Matthias Schweger signed another Austrian music project, Bingoboys, with Atlantic Records in New York City. The first single How To Dance peaked at No. 1 in the US Billboard Club Play, and was followed by an album The Best of Bingoboys.

== Music video career ==
Matthias Schweger started to direct music videos in 1987 with Bring Me Edelweiss. Together with Rudi Dolezal and Hannes Rossacher of DoRo Productions, he founded Department M.

Schweger oversaw the creative development process for over 120 music videos.

== Consulting ==
Schweger was hired to consult Dietrich Mateschitz, CEO and founder of Red Bull. The project Matthias Schweger headed was entitled "Red Bull Network", and included the creative, strategic, and technological planning of a global multi-media network featuring Red Bull Content.
