= Edelweiss (band) =

Austrian electronic dance music group

- Origin: Austria/Germany
- Genres: House, techno, new beat
- Years active: 1988–1993; 1997
- Past members: Martin Gletschermayer; Matthias Schweger; Walter Werzowa

Edelweiss were an Austrian electronic dance music group consisting of remixers Martin Gletschermayer, Matthias Schweger and Walter Werzowa. The group is best known for their 1988 worldwide hit "Bring Me Edelweiss", and their European hit "Starship Edelweiss".

Edelweiss reached the number one position with their hit "Bring Me Edelweiss", featuring Austrian folk singer Maria Mathis, who also did the live performances (and later recorded an updated version in 1999). The single was a hit in many European countries, supposedly by following the instructions given in The KLF's book The Manual. Borrowing large parts of its melody from ABBA's "SOS" and Indeep's "Last Night a DJ Saved My Life", the song humorously targeted Austrian ski resorts and yodeling and sold five million copies worldwide. Bill Drummond, one of the authors of The Manual (How to Have a Number One the Easy Way), mentioned the group in the epilogue of the German release of the book, which was originally published in 1989 (in English).

== Discography ==
=== Album ===
Year	Title	Chart positions	
Year	Title	^{AUT}	^{GER}
1992	Wonderful World of Edelweiss	11	91

=== Singles ===
Year	Single	Peak chart positions								Album
Year	Single	^{AT}	^{UK}	^{U.S. Dance}	^{U.S. Rock}	^{GER}	^{SUI}	^{NED}	^{SWE}	Album
1988 / 89	"Bring Me Edelweiss"	1	5	7	24	2	1	2	1	Singles only
1989	"I Can't Get No... Edelweiss"	—	—	—	—	—	—	—	—	Singles only
1992	"Raumschiff Edelweiss" / "Starship Edelweiss"	1	—	—	—	7	8	19	25	Wonderful World of Edelweiss
1992	"Planet Edelweiss"	14	—	—	—	—	—	—	—	Wonderful World of Edelweiss
1992	"To The Mountain Top"	—	—	—	—	—	—	—	—	Wonderful World of Edelweiss
1993	"Beam Me Up"	—	—	—	—	—	—	—	—	Wonderful World of Edelweiss
1993	"Ski Instructor"	—	—	—	—	—	—	—	—	Wonderful World of Edelweiss
1997	"Edeltaler Hochzeitsmarsch (Kein Sex vor der Ehe)"	—	—	—	—	—	—	—	—	Singles only
2001	"Bring Me Edelweiss" (Remix)	—	—	—	—	—	—	—	—	Singles only
