= Bring Me Edelweiss =

1988 single by Edelweiss

Single by Edelweiss

from the album Wonderful World of Edelweiss
- B-side: "Kitz-Stein-Horn"
- Released: 1988
- Length: 3:42
- Label: GiG
- Songwriters: Benny Andersson; Stig Anderson; Björn Ulvaeus; Klaus Biedermann; Paul Pfab; Martin Gletschermayer; Markus Moser; Walter Werzowa
- Producers: Martin Gletschermayer; Walter Werzowa

Edelweiss singles chronology
"Bring Me Edelweiss" (1988)	"I Can't Get No... Edelweiss" (1989)

Music video
- "Bring Me Edelweiss" on YouTube

"Bring Me Edelweiss" is a song by Austrian band Edelweiss, first released in late 1988 as a stand-alone single, then later included on their debut album Wonderful World of Edelweiss. The song was a hit in Europe and New Zealand, to a lesser extent also in the USA and Canada, reaching the number-one position in six countries and peaking within the top five on several other music charts, going on to sell over five million copies worldwide. The song contains numerous samples from other artists, most notably ABBA's 1975 song "SOS" in the chorus, and features yodeling.

== Origin ==
In 1988, British electronic band the Timelords (better known as the KLF) scored a number-one hit in the United Kingdom and New Zealand with the novelty song "Doctorin' the Tardis", which samples a number of songs, including Gary Glitter's "Rock and Roll" and The Sweet's "Block Buster!". As a result of the song's success, the band published a book entitled The Manual (How to Have a Number One the Easy Way). Written by members Bill Drummond and Jimmy Cauty, the book instructed—as a joke—how to earn a number-one hit without much work. One instruction, "Compose your music with bits you've nicked from other songs", was supposedly followed by Edelweiss, allowing them to compose "Bring Me Edelweiss."

== Content ==
The song features many samples. The primary sample, which the song's chorus is based on, is ABBA's 1975 song "SOS". ABBA usually do not allow other artists to sample their music, and they claimed Edelweiss never contacted them and never had permission to sample "SOS". However, members of the band claim that they managed to get one of ABBA's publishers to provide them with a contract during a drunken phone call in broken English. Other samples in the song include the 'Ow!'s from "Rock Me Amadeus" by fellow Austrian musician Falco, sections of Indeep's 1983 song "Last Night a DJ Saved My Life", and the 'Ah yeah' from Run-DMC's "Here We Go (Live at the Funhouse)". Yodeling is also common throughout the song, and the female vocals are provided by Austrian singer Maria Mathis.

Jason Roth of NPR described the song's music video as "either a cleavage-soaked Alpine fever dream capable of sending Julie Andrews sprinting back to the nuns, or the Ricola commercial to end all Ricola commercials".

== Track listings ==
European 7-inch single

A. "Bring Me Edelweiss" – 3:42
B. "Kitz-Stein-Horn" – 4:07

UK and European 12-inch single

A1. "Bring Me Edelweiss" (Tourist version) – 7:43
A2. "Bring Me Edelweiss" (7-inch version) – 3:42
B1. "Yodel" – 5:00
B2. "Schnaps Bonus" – 2:47

US 7-inch and cassette single

A. "Bring Me Edelweiss" (single version) – 3:41
B. "Bring Me Edelweiss" (Yodel version) – 4:58

US 12-inch single

A1. "Bring Me Edelweiss" (vocal mix) – 9:12
A2. "Bring Me Edelweiss" (rap) – 5:42
B1. "Bring Me Edelweiss" (Tourist version) – 7:40
B2. "Bring Me Edelweiss" (Yodel version) – 4:58

Canadian 12-inch single

A1. "Bring Me Edelweiss" (7-inch version) – 3:41
A2. "Bring Me Edelweiss" (vocal version) – 9:12
A3. "Bring Me Edelweiss" (rap version) – 5:42
B1. "Bring Me Edelweiss" (Inzest house version) – 7:31
B2. "Bring Me Edelweiss" (Tourist version) – 7:40
B3. "Bring Me Edelweiss" (Yodel version) – 4:58

2001 Austrian maxi-CD single

1. "Bring Me Edelweiss" (radio version) – 3:24
2. "Bring Me Edelweiss" (dance remix edit) – 3:24
3. "Bring Me Edelweiss" (extended dance remix) – 5:02
4. "Bring Me Edelweiss" (original party version) – 3:19

== Charts ==
=== Weekly charts ===
Chart (1988–1989)	Peak position
Austria (Ö3 Austria Top 40)	1
Belgium (Ultratop 50 Flanders)	2
Canada Dance/Urban (RPM)	4
Denmark (IFPI)	1
Europe (Eurochart Hot 100)	4
Finland (Suomen virallinen lista)	1
Ireland (IRMA)	5
Netherlands (Dutch Top 40)	3
Netherlands (Single Top 100)	2
New Zealand (Recorded Music NZ)	1
Norway (VG-lista)	2
Sweden (Sverigetopplistan)	1
Switzerland (Schweizer Hitparade)	1
UK Singles (Official Charts)	5
US 12-inch Singles Sales (Billboard)	11
US Dance Club Play (Billboard)	7
US Modern Rock Tracks (Billboard)	24
West Germany (GfK)	2

=== Year-end charts ===
Chart (1988)	Position
Austria (Ö3 Austria Top 40)	22

Chart (1989)	Position
Belgium (Ultratop)	32
Europe (Eurochart Hot 100)	47
Netherlands (Dutch Top 40)	25
Netherlands (Single Top 100)	19
New Zealand (RIANZ)	28
Switzerland (Schweizer Hitparade)	20
UK Singles (OCC)	78
West Germany (Media Control)	22

== Certifications and sales ==
Region	Certification	Certified units/sales
Germany (BVMI)	Gold	250,000^{^}
Sweden (GLF)	Gold	25,000^{^}
Summaries
Worldwide	—	5,000,000
^{^} Shipments figures based on certification alone.
