= RCSA =

RCSA may refer to:

- Racing Club de Strasbourg Alsace, French football club
- Reformed Churches in South Africa, Christian denomination in South Africa
- Research Corporation for Science Advancement, American organization
- Residual chemical shift anisotropy
- Robotics Certification Standards Alliance, company
- Royal College of Science Association
- Animal welfare and rights in South Africa, RabbitCare South Africa (RCSA)
- River City Science Academy, A Charter School in Jacksonville, Florida, part of the Duval County School District.
