= The Forgotten (1973 film) =

1973 horror film directed by S. F. Brownrigg

- Theatrical release poster
- Directed by: S. F. Brownrigg
- Written by: Tim Pope
- Produced by: S. F. Brownrigg
- Starring: Bill McGhee; Rosie Holotik; Anne MacAdams; Gene Ross; Hugh Feagin; Camilla Carr
- Cinematography: Robert B. Alcott
- Edited by: Jerry Caraway
- Music by: Robert Farrar
- Production companies: Camera 2 Productions; Century Studios
- Distributed by: Hallmark Releasing Corporation; American International Pictures
- Release date: May 16, 1973 (El Paso, Texas)
- Running time: 90 minutes
- Language: English
- Budget: $100,000
- Box office: $1 million

The Forgotten (Note: Though originally filmed and released as The Forgotten, the film was popularly distributed under several alternative titles, the most well-known being Don't Look in the Basement. Other alternative titles include Death Ward #13, Beyond Help, and The Snake Pit.) is a 1973 American horror film directed by S. F. Brownrigg in his directorial debut, written by Tim Pope, and starring Bill McGhee, Rosie Holotik, and Annabelle Weenick (credited as Anne MacAdams). Its plot focuses on a young nurse, Charlotte Beale, who takes a job at a rural sanitarium plagued by a series of mysterious murders.

An independent production, The Forgotten was filmed over twelve days in Tehuacana, Texas. It was originally released independently in May 1973, before Hallmark Releasing Corporation and American International Pictures (AIP) acquired it for theatrical distribution. Hallmark and AIP issued the film under several alternative titles before settling on Don't Look in the Basement. It was distributed under this title beginning in July 1973, and continued to screen at theaters and drive-ins throughout the 1970s, often paired with The Last House on the Left (1972), The House That Vanished (1973), and Let Sleeping Corpses Lie (1974), the latter of which was issued under the title Don't Open the Window. The film was a sleeper hit, grossing $1 million in theatrical rentals after its first several years of release.

A sequel, Id: Don't Look in the Basement 2, was directed by Brownrigg's son, Anthony, and released in 2015.

== Plot ==
Stephens Sanitarium is a secluded rural mental health institute whose chief doctor, Dr. Stephens, believes that the best way to cure insanity is to allow the patients to act out their realities freely. After a patient threatens her life, an elderly nurse decides to retire. Meanwhile, in the process of therapy (chopping wood with an axe), Oliver W. Cameron, the crazed former magistrate known as Judge, lands the axe into Stephens's back, apparently killing him. The nurse finishes packing and is attacked by Harriett, a patient who accuses her of stealing her "baby" (a plastic doll). The patient kills her by crushing her head in the nurse's suitcase.

The only remaining doctor appears to be Geraldine Masters, who vows to continue Dr. Stephens's work. Later, she is greeted by Charlotte Beale, a young nurse who reveals that Dr. Stephens hired her a week before. Masters allows her to settle in. Charlotte meets the patients, including a lobotomized and child-like man named Sam, who enjoys popsicles and his toy boat, a schizophrenic nymphomaniac named Allyson, an emotionally dependent woman named Jennifer, an octogenarian named Mrs. Callingham who spouts poetry and mistakes flowers in the garden for her children, juvenile prankster Danny, a shellshocked Sergeant who lost his mind after accidentally killing his men in Vietnam, and the judge.

Later, a telephone man investigates the faulty phone system at the institution. Callingham's tongue is cut out of her mouth during her sleep. However, Masters tells Charlotte that Callingham did it to herself. After he disobeys her, Masters burns the Sergeant's hand and later murders Jennifer for stealing medicine. Sam discovers the telephone man dead in a closet and tells Allyson. Allyson is distraught because she thought the man would marry her. Allyson reveals Masters' secret to Charlotte: Masters is a patient at the institute whom Stephens allowed to pose as a doctor. Masters presumably murdered the telephone man to ensure that he would not report the institution. Callingham indicates to Charlotte that it was Masters who cut out her tongue, apparently to prevent the elderly woman from disclosing the secret. Later, the Judge reveals that they all know Masters is a patient, but also think that Charlotte is one.

Allyson confronts Masters about the murder of the telephone man, saying that Charlotte now knows what is going on. During the confrontation, she implies that Masters used to be a real doctor, but was fired after killing a patient; this psychotic break led to her being institutionalized. Charlotte realizes that her life is in danger and tries to escape, but finds that all the windows and doors have been boarded up by Masters. Allyson later convinces herself that the man is still alive and drags his body to her room to have sex with it. Masters commands the Judge to reveal Charlotte's location. The Judge instead says that he and the other patients have found Masters guilty and that she is no longer in charge.

Sam then leads Charlotte to the basement, where a man grabs her ankle, and she responds by beating him to death with a toy boat. She realizes that it is Stephens, but not before finishing him off. At the direction of Masters, Sam leads Charlotte upstairs. Sam thinks that Charlotte intentionally murdered Stephens and helps restrain her. However, he has a flashback to his lobotomy (with which Masters assisted) and rescues Charlotte. Masters cowers in a corner when Sam leaves, and the other patients enter with weapons and kill her. Sam leads Charlotte outside through a passage in the basement. Charlotte pleads for Sam to escape with her, but he returns inside the room with the other patients. Disturbed by the murder scene, Sam grabs the axe and kills all the other inmates except Callingham, who is not in the room. Charlotte listens to the massacre outside and then flees. Sam leaves the room to get a popsicle and starts crying.

== Cast ==
- Bill McGhee as Sam
- Rosie Holotik as Nurse Charlotte Beale
- Annabelle Weenick as Dr. Geraldine S. Masters (credited as Anne MacAdams)
- Gene Ross as "Judge" Oliver W. Cameron
- Camilla Carr as Harriett
- Hugh Feagin as Sergeant Jaffee
- Betty Chandler as Allyson King
- Jessie Kirby as Danny
- Jessie Lee Fulton as Jane St. Claire
- Rhea MacAdams as Mrs. Callingham
- Robert Dracup as Ray Daniels
- Harryette Warren as Jennifer
- Michael Harvey as Dr. Stephens

== Production ==
The Forgotten marked the feature directorial debut of S. F. Brownrigg, who had previously worked making industrial films in Dallas, Texas. The film was shot in Tehuacana, Texas, over a period of twelve days in the summer of 1972, with a primarily Dallas-based cast and crew. Principal photography took place on the campus of Westminster College (later Trinity University) in Tehuacana.

The film's cast, hired out of Dallas, included Jessie Lee Fulton, who had recently appeared in Peter Bogdanovich's Texas-filmed The Last Picture Show (1971), as well as on the soap opera As the World Turns.

== Release ==
=== Theatrical run ===
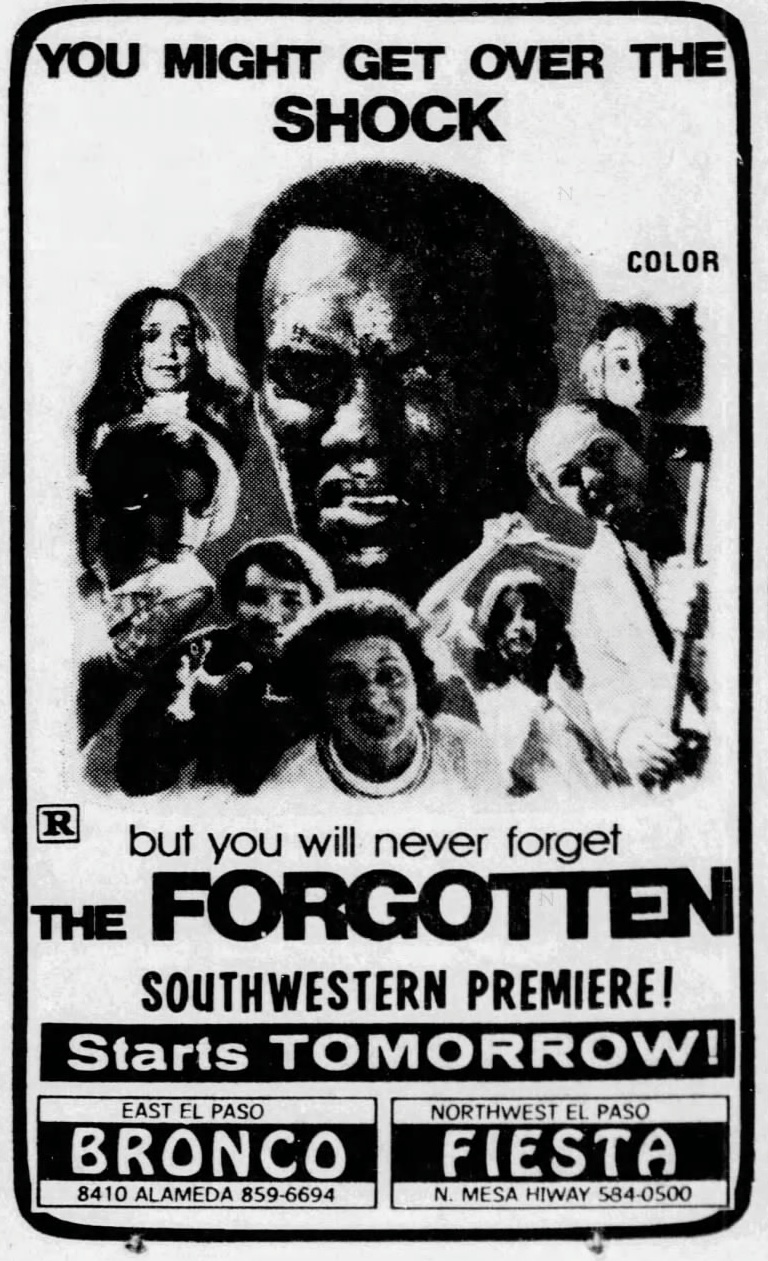
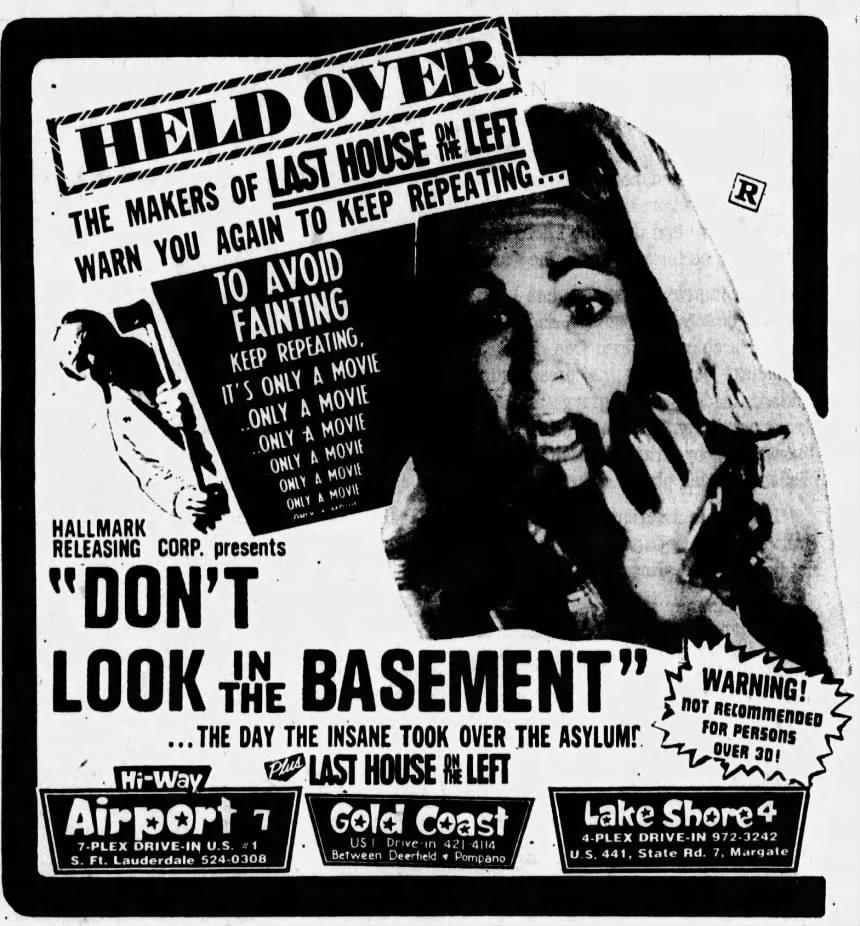
1973 newspaper advertisements for the film under its original title (left), and as Don't Look in the Basement (right)

The Forgotten premiered in El Paso, Texas on May 16, 1973. Shortly thereafter, the film was acquired for theatrical distribution by Hallmark Releasing, a sub-distributor for American International Pictures. Hallmark had great success with The Last House on the Left (1972), particularly with the tag line "To avoid fainting, keep repeating: it's only a movie...only a movie...only a movie". In July 1973, they test-marketed the film under a number of new titles, including The Snake Pit, Beyond Help, and Death Ward No. 13, before settling on Don't Look In The Basement.

The film was released as Don't Look in the Basement in late July 1973, opening in Portland, Maine. It opened in the Greater Boston area on August 8, 1973. The film opened in Chicago and Lexington, Kentucky in late September 1973.

Hallmark continued to program the film throughout the remainder of the 1970s, often issuing it as part of double or triple bills with other titles such as The Last House on the Left, The House That Vanished, and Let Sleeping Corpses Lie (which Hallmark released in the United States in a truncated cut as Don't Open the Window).

=== Censorship ===
In the United Kingdom, the film was released in a significantly truncated cut, with approximately twelve minutes excised from the original version. This version, likened by Demonique magazine to a "PG rated version," omits the majority of the film's violence and gore. The final axe massacre in the film's climax was edited to show only reaction shots and brief glimpses of blood spattering on walls.

=== Home media ===
The Forgotten was released for the first time on DVD by VCI Video on January 25, 2000. It was later released by BCI on January 22, 2002, as a part of its two-disk "Evil Places" movie pack. BCI would later re-release the film in 2004 and in 2005 in various multi-movie packs. The film was released five separate times in 2003 by Diamond Entertainment, Platinum Disc, Pop Flix, and Alpha Video respectively. In 2004, it was released twice by St. Clair Entertainment on February 24, and March 2. On October 25, and November 29 that same year, it was released by Elstree Hill Entertainment and HHO respectively.

In 2005, Platinum Disk re-released the film three separate times as a part of various multi-film packs. That same year, it would also be released by Stax, Mill Creek Entertainment, Black Horse, and re-released by Diamond Entertainment. The following year saw the film's re-release by both Mill Creek and Vci, as a part of several multi-movie collections. Mill Creek would once again re-release the film in 2007, as a double-feature alongside Don't Open the Door! (1975). It was released both as a single feature by Video International in 2008 and as a part of a five-disk movie pack by Echo Bridge Home Entertainment in 2010. Echo Bridge would include the film the following year along with Madacy Home Video in several multi-film collections. In 2012, the film was released by Film Chest and re-released by Pop Flix on January 24, and April 10, respectively. Mill Creek re-released the film one more time in 2013, for their three-disk "American Horror Stories: 12 Movie Collection". In 2014 Film Chest re-released a digitally restored version of the film in November. Film Chest then released the film on December 16, the following month. In 2015, the film was released as a single feature by VFN and by Films Around The World Inc. On October 25, 2016, it was released by VCI and the following month by Film Detective.

It was released for the first time on Blu-ray by Brink in a double-feature, alongside its sequel Don't Look in the Basement 2 (2015). 2018 saw the film's releases on both Blu-ray and DVD by Code Red and VCI.

== Reception ==
=== Box office ===
The Forgotten was a sleeper hit for American International Pictures, earning $1 million in theatrical rentals in the United States over several years.

=== Critical response ===
Doc Halliday of the Cedar Rapids Gazette panned the film, describing the acting as "awful; the plot mindless; the direction is slipshod. It can be described succinctly as a stag film without the sex."

Dave Sindelar on his film review website Fantastic Movie Musings and Ramblings gave the film a mixed review. In his review on the film Sindelar criticized the film's premise, calling it "hard to swallow" and the unnecessary nastiness of film's climax. However, Sindelar also wrote, "Nonetheless, the characters are quite interesting, and the acting from the cast of unknowns is excellent for such a low-budget movie, and there are enough moments sprinkled throughout the movie that show a sense of real sadness and a sense of humanity that give a greater texture to the proceedings. Ultimately, the strong points make the movie work, and I can appreciate it well enough, even if it does remain in that realm of movies that are simply not much fun for me." Rob Gonsalves from ‘’eFilmCritic.com’’ awarded the film one out of five stars, calling it “a grade-Z horror flick”.

Cavett Binion of AllMovie gave it a generally favorable review, writing, "somehow the intrinsic sleaziness generated by the threadbare production manages to lend it a remarkably suitable ambience."

TV Guide gave the film a positive review, writing, “Despite the overall cheapness of the production, director S.F. Brownrigg does manage to convey a sense of seedy claustrophobia during the depraved proceedings.” Almar Haflidason from BBC gave the film three out of five stars. While it was omitted from Phil Hardy's The Aurum Film Encyclopedia: Horror, replaced with a review for Don't Look Now, the earlier edition, The Encyclopedia of Horror Movies (Harper & Row, 1986) provided a favorable review: "What lifts the film out of the usual run of asylum movies is its creation of a claustrophobic, hermetically sealed world and a powerfully unremitting ambience of craziness. Added to this are the inmates themselves, each hopelessly enmeshed in with their own obsessions and unable to communicate with the outside world but each also representing distinctly recognizable, identifiable, facets of humanity, though seen through a frighteningly distorting prism -- the judge consumed with guilt, the man who believes he is an army sergeant, a girl whose maternal feelings become fixated on a doll and so on."

== Legacy ==
=== Remake ===
In May 2008, a remake of the film was being planned by directors Alan Rowe Kelly and Anthony G. Sumner. Filming was scheduled for October 2008 in Indiana with a planned 2009 release, but this version never came to fruition.

In March 2017, former horror punk guitarist from the Misfits, Doyle Wolfgang Von Frankenstein, was cast in Death Ward 13, a remake and continuation of Don't Look in the Basement, to be directed by Todd Nunes (All Through the House) and produced by The Readmond Company. The second planned remake has not yet come to fruition.

=== Sequel ===
In December 2013, a sequel titled Id: Don't Look in the Basement 2 was announced with Anthony Brownrigg, son of S.F. Brownrigg, directing. The film was shot in Texas in March/April 2014 and used several of the same locations from the original film. The sequel was eventually released in 2015.

== Sources ==
- Craig, Rob (2019). American International Pictures: A Comprehensive Filmography. Jefferson, North Carolina: McFarland & Company. ISBN 978-1-476-66631-0.
- Kerekes, David; Slater, David (2000). See No Evil: Banned Films and Video Controversy. London, England: Headpress. ISBN 978-1-900-48610-1.
- Milne, Tom; Willemen, Paul; Glaessner, Verina; Petley, Julian; Pulleine, Tim (1986). Hardy, Phil (ed.). The Encyclopedia of Horror Movies. New York City, New York: Harper & Row. ISBN 978-0-060-55050-9.
