= Ashley Mary Nunes =

Ashley Mary Nunes is an American horror actress, producer, and model.

== Early life ==
Nunes earned a Psychology degree from California State University, Stanislaus and worked as a Probation Counselor.

== Career ==
Nunes will be featured in the upcoming Grindhouse horror film Death Ward 13 with former Misfit’s Guitarist Doyle Wolfgang von Frankenstein, and directed by Todd Nunes. She will also star as "Lori" in the 2018 horror film Safe Place alongside co-stars Genoveva Rossi, Lloyd Kaufman, and James R Taylor.

Ashley Mary Nunes starred in the Holiday horror slasher All Through The House (2015) featuring Jessica Cameron and written and directed by Todd Nunes. The film was produced by Los Angeles-based The Readmond Company and received several film festival awards and nominations.

Ashley Mary Nunes starred in the horror slasher Scary Larry, written and co-directed by Todd Nunes, and she appeared in Fangoria's horror/thriller feature, Inhuman Resources (2012) directed by Daniel Krige.

Ashley Mary Nunes appeared in Season 1 of the SyFy Channel's Robot Combat League, a robot fighting competition hosted by professional wrestler Chris Jericho. Nunes and her fighting partner Kyle Samuelson operated the robot Steampunk and made it to the championship finals (Ep. 9). They were defeated by the father/daughter team of Dave and Amber Shinsel and their robot Crash.

== Awards and nominations ==
- 2nd Place Award Best Actress (Ashley Mary Nunes), All Through The House, The Action on Film International Film Festival, USA (2016)
- Nominated Best Ensemble, All Through The House, RIP Horror Film Festival, USA (2015)

== Personal life ==
Nunes is the sister of horror film screenwriter and director Todd Nunes.
