= Robot Combat League =

American robot combat television series

- Genre: Action
- Presented by: Chris Jericho
- Country of origin: United States
- Original language: English
- No. of seasons: 1
- No. of episodes: 9

Production
- Production company: Smart Dog Media

Original release
- Network: Syfy
- Release: February 26 – April 23, 2013

Robot Combat League (RCL) is a U.S. television show on the Syfy network about robot fighting competitions. On the show, teams use exosuits to control fighting robots. The series is hosted by Chris Jericho and was first shown on February 26, 2013, at 10pm EST.

== Overview ==
Each weekly show has tournament competitions between 8-foot, 1,000-pound humanoid robots controlled by human competitors, one robo-jockey and one robo-tech per team. The series has 12 teams of individuals from diverse backgrounds. Each team is paired with a robot that they control using an exo-suit that directs its movements. Each fight is of three rounds and the winning team advances. There are 12 robots.

The robots range from an axe-headed laser-eyed warrior to a robot made of plexiglass and a roll cage.

The robots and the suits used to control them were created by the robotics expert Mark Setrakian.

== Rules ==
- Fights consist of three, two-minute rounds
- Three ringside judges score the action to determine a winner
- Points are awarded to strong solid hits to vital parts
- Teams have a pit crew and twenty minutes in between rounds to make all necessary repairs
- Judges can stop a round early due to excessive damage
- Robots can be KO'd if they are unable to make the bell signifying the round's end

—

^Note: In the season one finale's championship fight there were five two-minute rounds, with the winner being the first team to win three rounds out of the five.

== Competitors ==
Each team consists of a uniquely themed robot and two human controllers.

- One human is the "Robo-Jockey," controlling the robot's arms and torso while standing via an exosuit-like harness strapped to his or her back and arms.
- The other human is the "Robo-Tech," seated in a chair while using two joysticks to control the robot's feet and any other unique parts, such as the movable axe "head" on A.X.E.

Each robot is powered by hydraulic and pneumatic actuators. Each robot moves on two feet, stabilized by a bar that attaches at the back of the robot, above the legs. The robots each have six actuators at the waist, and several more in each arm. The robots are all styled and painted to be unique and distinct from each other. This unique styling is especially expressed in the different types and designs of armour that cover each robot, from sheet steel, to steel pipe roll cages, to carbon-fiber, to leather. The robots' hands are also all individually styled, and can be quickly detached to facilitate repairs between rounds, or swapped out for weapon attachments. Several cameras may be mounted on each robot by the show staff to capture show footage, but none of the camera images were used to help control of the robot.

The robots are controlled by the "Robo-Jockey" and "Robo-Tech" by direct line of sight, from two raised platforms at either end of the arena.

The initial team seed order was determined by a timed challenge in the first episode.

== Episodes ==
=== Overview ===
Season	Episodes	Season premiere	Season finale
1	9	February 26, 2013	April 23, 2013

=== Season 1 (2013) ===
No.	Title	Original air date	Powerup Challenges / training / match-ups	Fight winner(s)	
1	"Rise of the Machines"	Feb. 26, 2013	Man meets machine / Steel Cyclone vs Crash	Crash	
2	"Blood, Sweat and Gears"	Mar. 5, 2013	Scorpio vs Commander / Thunder Skull vs Brimstone	Scorpio	Brimstone
3	"A Hero's Journey"	Mar. 12, 2013	Game Over vs A.X.E./ George Lucas cameo / Robo Hammer vs Drone Strike	A.X.E.	Drone Strike
4	"The Fight of Your Life"	Mar. 19, 2013	Special training with Freddie Roach / Steampunk vs Medieval	Steampunk	
5	"The Next Level of Carnage"	Mar. 26, 2013	Big surprise / Quarter-finals begins / A.X.E vs Scorpio	Scorpio	
6	"Kicking Bot"	Apr. 2, 2013	Steampunk vs Drone Strike / Crash vs Brimstone	Steampunk	Crash
7	"Wild Card Fight"	Apr. 9, 2013	Steel Cyclone vs Thunder Skull (both voted in by remaining teams) / Weapon selection	Steel Cyclone	
8	"Semi-Finals"	Apr. 16, 2013	Crash vs Scorpio / Steampunk vs Steel Cyclone	Crash	Steampunk
9	"Built Like a Champion"	Apr. 23, 2013	Powered weapon reveal & corner man selection / Crash vs Steampunk	Crash	

== Season One teams and competition results ==
=== Robots ===
Seed	Robot	Speed	Strength	Endurance	Height	Weight	Reach	Strengths	Weaknesses
1	Steel Cyclone	9	6	5	7'0"	768 lbs	41 in	• Torpedo fists with hemispherical striking surface • Low profile head and torso	• Medium armor crumple zone
2	Commander	5	10	8	8'4"	814 lbs	46 in	• Tank tread feet for extra traction • Giant fists	• Exposed midsection
3	Game Over	6	9	8	8'7"	760 lbs	40.5 in	• Massive steel and polycarbonate body armor	• Top heavy
4	Brimstone	10	7	6	8'2"	756 lbs	42 in	• Hammered steel dome is impenetrable • Leather armor absorbs impact	• Hydraulic fluid breaks down leather armor
5	Medieval	6	8	8	7'11"	775 lbs	42.5 in	• Spike ball • Shock mounted arm shield	• Asymmetrical design may be difficult to control
6	Robohammer	8	8	6	8'0"	766 lbs	40 in	• Chromoly steel fists are heaviest of all robots	• Must maintain striking distance
7	Drone Strike	6	9	8	8'0"	792 lbs	43.5 in	• Gatling fists • Complete torso protection	• Shallow armor crumple zone
8	Steampunk	5	7	10	8'3"	819 lbs	44 in	• Deep armor crumple zone for excellent endurance • No shoulder armor for best arm mobility	• No shoulder armor
9	Thunder Skull	5	9	8	8'5"	785 lbs	40.5 in	• Massive steel fists are long and heavy • Steel armor with excellent coverage	• No easy access for repairs
10	A.X.E.	5	7	8	7'10"	842 lbs	37.5 in	• Axe-head weapon • Excellent front armor protection	• Must maintain close range to fight effectively
11	Scorpio	9	8	5	8'1"	760 lbs	43.5 in	• Blade weapons • Carbon fiber composite armor	• Carbon fiber armor is not as strong as steel
12	Crash	7	5	10	7'9"	826 lbs	38.5 in	• Chromoly steel roll cage	• Roll cage is hard-mounted, does not absorb impact

=== Human competitors ===
Time spent on Power-up Challenge	Speed	Robo-Jockey	Robo-Tech	Notes
16.20s	8	Ashley Mary Nunes, superhero impersonator	Kyle Samuelson, robotics teacher	Assisted by Fazlul "Fuzz" Zubair in Championship
15.26s	6	Amanda Lucas, MMA fighter	Saura Naderi, roboticist	Daughter of George Lucas, cameo appearance episode 3
08.77s	3	Keisha Howard, pro gamer	Annika O'Brien, robotics engineer
10.23s	5	John Peel, former college athlete	Heather Knight, electrical engineer	Did not participate in Wild Card selection
16.02s	7	Ciji Thornton, pro gamer	Fazlul "Fuzz" Zubair, rocket scientist
20.50s	10	Andrew Montanez, MMA fighter	Ross Mead, PhD, robotics researcher
21.76s	11	Diana Yang, industrial design student	Chris Hardouin, toy designer
07.00s	2	Jeffrey Fellin, helicopter pilot	Paulo Younse, JPL engineer	Did not participate in Wild Card selection
20.02s	9	Heather Williams, race car driver	Brandon Lewis, I.T. specialist	Lost Wild Card round
09.28s	4	Devonric Johnson, former All-American athlete	Russell Tait, mechanical engineer and software developer
06.64s	1	Bayano Kamani, former Olympic athlete	Dr. George Kirkman, robotics teacher	Won Wild Card round; returned in semi-finals
65.12s	12	Amber Shinsel, software engineer	Dave Shinsel, software manager	Father/daughter team; assisted by Ross Mead in Championship

=== Tournament results ===
Round 1
1	Steel Cyclone	KO
12	Crash	Rd.2
4	Brimstone	Rd. 2
9	Thunder Skull	DQ'd
2	Commander	KO
11	Scorpio	Rd.3
3	Game Over	UD
10	A.X.E.	Rd.3
6	Robohammer	KO
7	Drone Strike	Rd.1
5	Medieval	83
8	Steampunk	88

Quarterfinals
12	Crash	Rd. 3
4	Brimstone	KO
11	Scorpio	Rd. 1
10	A.X.E.	KO
7	Drone Strike	75
8	Steampunk	90
Wild Card
1	Steel Cyclone	Rd. 3
9	Thunder Skull	KO

Semifinals
12	Crash	84
11	Scorpio	81
8	Steampunk	86
1	Steel Cyclone	85

Final
12	Crash	144
8	Steampunk	136

=== Season One team status ===
Seed	Robot	Robo-Jockey	Robo-Tech	Team status	Defeated by	Wins	Losses	Final position	Notes
1	Steel Cyclone	Bayano Kamani, former Olympic athlete	Dr. George Kirkman, robotics teacher	Knocked out in Round 2 of first fight; lost by decision (86–85)	Crash and Steampunk	1	2	Semi-finals (Ep. 8)	Won Wild Card round; returned in semi-finals
2	Commander	Jeffrey Fellin, helicopter pilot	Paulo Younse, JPL engineer	Knocked out in Round 3	Scorpio	0	1	First fight (Ep. 2)	Did not participate in Wild Card selection
3	Game Over	Keisha Howard, pro gamer	Annika O'Brien, robotics engineer	Lost by decision	A.X.E.	0	1	First fight (Ep. 3)
4	Brimstone	Devonric Johnson, former All-American athlete	Russell Tait, mechanical engineer and software developer	Knocked out in Round 3	Crash	1	1	Quarter-finals (Ep. 6)
5	Medieval	John Peel, former college athlete	Heather Knight, electrical engineer	Lost by decision (88–83)	Steampunk	0	1	First fight (Ep. 4)	Did not participate in Wild Card selection
6	Robohammer	Amanda Lucas, MMA fighter	Saura Naderi, roboticist	Knocked out in Round 1	Drone Strike	0	1	First fight (Ep. 3)	Daughter of George Lucas, cameo appearance episode 3
7	Drone Strike	Ciji Thornton, pro gamer	Fazlul "Fuzz" Zubair, rocket scientist	Knocked out in Round 3	Steampunk	1	1	Quarter-finals (Ep. 6)
8	Steampunk	Ashley Mary Nunes, superhero impersonator	Kyle Samuelson, robotics teacher	Lost by decision (144–136)	Crash	3	1	Championship (Ep. 9)	Assisted by Fazlul "Fuzz" Zubair in Championship
9	Thunder Skull	Heather Williams, race car driver	Brandon Lewis, I.T. specialist	Disqualified during first fight / Knocked out in Round 3	Brimstone and Steel Cyclone	0	2	Wild Card (Ep. 7)	Lost Wild Card round
10	A.X.E.	Andrew Montanez, MMA fighter	Ross Mead, PhD robotics researcher	Knocked out in Round 2	Scorpio	1	1	Quarter-finals (Ep. 5)
11	Scorpio	Diana Yang, industrial design student	Chris Hardouin, toy designer	Lost by decision (84–81)	Crash	2	1	Semi-finals (Ep. 8)
12	Crash	Amber Shinsel, software engineer	Dave Shinsel, robotics manager	Undefeated	(Undefeated)	4	0	Champions (Ep. 9)	Father/daughter team; assisted by Ross Mead in Championship

=== Semi-finals match-ups ===
Each semifinalist was offered a choice from four different weapons. The weapons are only meant for use during the third round. They are assembled to only one arm of the robot.

Weapon	Robo-Jockey	Robo-Tech	Seed	Robot	Speed	Strength	Endurance	Wins	Losses	Status	Notes
Grinder	Diana Yang	Chris Hardouin	11	Scorpio	9	8	5	2	0	Lost
Double Shank	Ashley Mary Nunes	Kyle Samuelson	8	Steampunk	5	7	10	2	0	Won
Tornado	Bayano Kamani	Dr. George Kirkman	1	Steel Cyclone	9	6	5	1	1	Lost	Won Wild Card round
Bunker	Amber Shinsel	Dave Shinsel	12	Crash	7	5	10	2	0	Won	Father/daughter team

=== Championship match-up ===
Robo-Jockey	Robo-Tech	Seed	Robot	Speed	Strength	Endurance	Wins	Losses	Status	Notes
Amber Shinsel	Dave Shinsel	12	Crash	7	5	10	4	0	Champion	Father/daughter team; assisted by Ross Mead
Ashley Mary Nunes	Kyle Samuelson	8	Steampunk	5	7	10	3	1	Runner-up	Assisted by Fazlul "Fuzz" Zubair

Championship scores
Round	1	2	3	4	5	Final score
Judges	30–25	29–25	30–27	29–28	30–27	144–136
Winner	Crash	Crash	Steampunk	Steampunk	Crash	Crash

== See also ==
- Real Steel – a science fiction sports drama film, starring Hugh Jackman, where in the year 2020 human boxers have been replaced by robot boxers
- Robot Jox – a science fiction sports drama film about giant mechanical machines, that fight international battles in a dystopian post-apocalyptic world, piloted by "Robot Jockeys" who represent their respective nations
- Robot Wars
- BattleBots
- Robot Fighting League
- RoboGames
- Combots
- Robo One
- Robot competition
- Rock 'Em Sock 'Em Robots
