= Soldier in the Rain =

1963 film by Ralph Nelson

- Theatrical release poster
- Directed by: Ralph Nelson
- Written by: Blake Edwards; Maurice Richlin
- Based on: Soldier in the Rain; 1960 novel by William Goldman
- Produced by: Martin Jurow
- Starring: Jackie Gleason; Steve McQueen; Tuesday Weld; Tony Bill; Tom Poston; Ed Nelson
- Cinematography: Philip H. Lathrop
- Edited by: Ralph E. Winters
- Music by: Henry Mancini
- Production company: Solar Productions
- Distributed by: Allied Artists
- Release date: November 27, 1963 (United States)
- Running time: 96 minutes
- Country: United States
- Language: English

Soldier in the Rain is a 1963 American comedy buddy film directed by Ralph Nelson and starring Jackie Gleason and Steve McQueen. Tuesday Weld portrays Gleason's character Maxwell Slaughter's romantic partner Bobby Jo Pepperdine.

Produced by Martin Jurow and co-written by Maurice Richlin and Blake Edwards, the screenplay is based on the 1960 novel of the same name by William Goldman. It explores the friendship of Army Master Sergeant Slaughter (Gleason) and a young country bumpkin buck Sergeant Eustis Clay (McQueen). The music is by Henry Mancini.

== Plot ==
Sergeant Eustis Clay is anticipating finishing his peacetime service and moving on to different things. He is a personal favorite of Master Sergeant Maxwell Slaughter, a career soldier who is considerably smarter than Clay, but enjoys his company and loyalty. Slaughter is connected to all the perks, back channels and supply sources the Army base can provide, and they all filter through his nearly autonomous cabin hub.

Clay becomes involved in a number of schemes and scams, including one in which he will sell tickets for soldiers to watch Private Jerry Meltzer purportedly run a three-minute mile. He inconveniences Slaughter more than once, and in one case has a traffic mishap requiring him to be bailed out of jail.

Determined to tempt Slaughter with the joys of civilian life before his hitch is up, Clay fixes him up on a date with a much younger woman, not-too-bright Bobby Jo Pepperdine. At first, Slaughter is offended, but gradually he sees another side of Bobby Jo, finding they have a mutual fondness for crossword puzzles. Clay and Slaughter golf together and begin to enjoy the good life.

One night, Clay is devastated to learn of the death of his dog Donald. A pair of hated rivals use their status as military policemen to lure Clay into a barroom brawl, where he is being beaten two-against-one before Slaughter angrily comes to his rescue. Together, they win the fight, but the middle-aged, overweight Slaughter collapses from the effort.

Hospitalized, Slaughter delights Clay by suggesting they leave the Army together and go live on a tropical isle, surrounded by blue seas and beautiful girls. But Slaughter dies. A changed man, Clay re-enlists in the Army with a new sense of purpose.

== Cast ==
- Jackie Gleason as Master Sergeant Maxwell Slaughter
- Steve McQueen as Sergeant Eustis Clay
- Tuesday Weld as Bobby Jo Pepperdine
- Tony Bill as Private First Class Jerry Meltzer
- Tom Poston as Lieutenant Magee
- Ed Nelson as MP Sergeant First Class James Priest
- Lew Gallo as Sergeant Fred Lenahan
- Rockne Tarkington as First Sergeant William Booth
- Paul Hartman as Chief of Police
- John Hubbard as Battalion Major
- Chris Noel as Frances McCoy
- Sam Flint as Old Man
- Lewis Charles as Sergeant Tozzi
- Adam West as Inspecting Captain

== Original novel ==
Soldier in the Rain
- Author: William Goldman
- Language: English
- Publisher: Atheneum
- Publication date: 14 July 1960
- Publication place: United States

William Goldman drew his novel from his experience in the United States Army from 1952 to 1954. He set it at a fictional Southern Army post, Camp Scott, in spring and summer 1953. He said he was stuck during the writing, so he asked his roommate John Kander, also an aspiring writer, to read it. Kander suggested the character Bobby Jo Pepperdine (eventually played by Tuesday Weld) should be developed as a major figure. This suggestion helped Goldman finish the book.

Goldman said the publisher put pressure on him to change the ending:

It was one of the first three books of the firm, and they said "We can't publish this ending. It's a downer. We guarantee you the book won't sell. Will you change it? I said, "I will absolutely change it, and I will give it a very happy ending, if you can guarantee me the book will sell." They said, "Obviously, we can't guarantee that," and I said, "Obviously, I can't change the ending."

Goldman said the character of Eustis Clay "was sympathetic for me. There was a sergeant who was a villain, but I thought Clay was just a nice affable stoop. I'd been in the army. A lot of this stuff is also, as I look back on it, autobiographical."

The novel received mixed reviews.

== Production ==
Although Goldman became a noted screenwriter, he was not involved in the adaptation of his novel for the film of the same name. "They made changes," said Goldman of the film. "No one says, 'Oh, we are going to fuck up Bill Goldman's book.' Most of this stuff I didn't pay any attention to. I don't know that I've ever seen Soldier in the Rain. I must have because I like Tuesday Weld, but as a rule I don't look at movies I'm involved with and I don't read books that I've written. One does the best one can and that's it."

== Reception ==
In 2011, film critic Craig Butler wrote about the film's theme:

An absorbing film that deserves to be much better known, Soldier in the Rain is a sometimes uneasy blend of comedy and drama that doesn't always quite come off, but has so much going for it that one is glad to overlook its flaws. A buddy picture set in the peacetime Army, Soldier is concerned with how a strong friendship can develop between two people of differing personalities and aims. Jackie Gleason and Steve McQueen are different types, and the fact that they have such a strong bond may at first seem unlikely, but as the film progresses it somehow seems natural and inevitable. Blake Edwards and Maurice Richlin have done an excellent job of adapting William Goldman's novel, and together with director Ralph Nelson have opted to emphasize the character aspects of the material over the plot.

== See also ==
- List of American films of 1963
