= Educational robotics =

Field of robotics

Educational robotics teaches the design, analysis, application and operation of robots. Robots include articulated robots, mobile robots or autonomous vehicles. Educational robotics can be taught from elementary school to graduate programs. Robotics may also be used to motivate and facilitate the instruction other, often foundational, topics such as computer programming, artificial intelligence or engineering design.

== Education and training ==
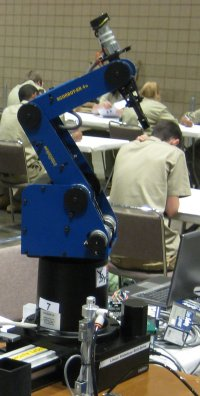
The SCORBOT-ER 4u – educational robot

Robotics engineers design robots, maintain them, develop new applications for them, and conduct research to expand the potential of robotics. Robots have become a popular educational tool in some middle and high schools, as well as in numerous youth summer camps, raising interest in programming, artificial intelligence and robotics among students. First-year computer science courses at several universities now include programming of a robot in addition to traditional software engineering-based coursework.

== Category of Educational robotics ==
The categories of educational robots seen as having more than one category. It can be alienated into different categories based on their physical design and coding method. Generally they are categorised as arm robots, wheeled mobile robots and humanoid robots. Tangibly, coded robots uses a physical means of coding instead of the screens coding.

=== Initiatives in schools ===
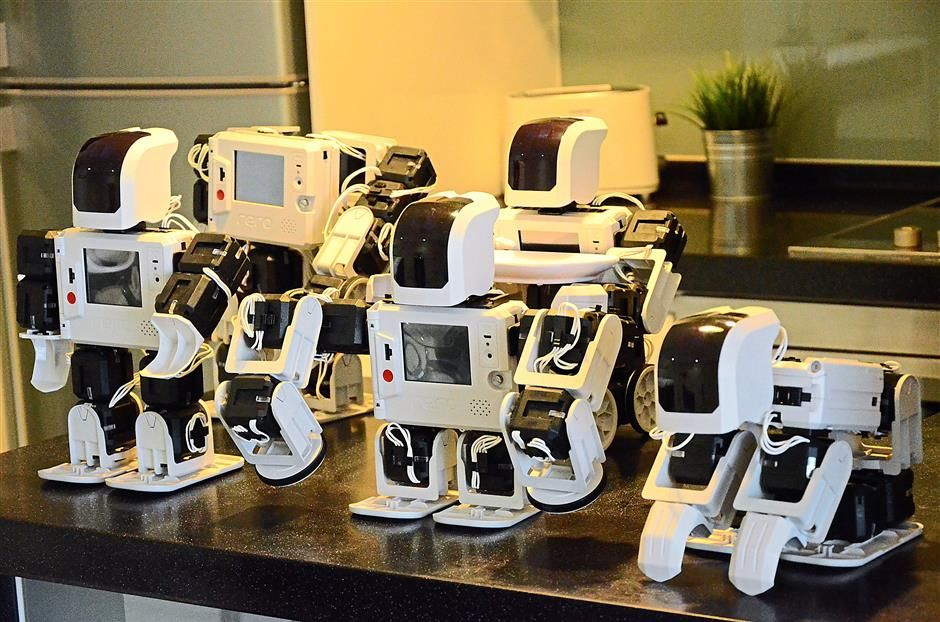
Rero reconfigurable robots, designed as easy to assemble and easy to program

Leachim, was a robot teacher programmed with the class curriculum, as well as certain biographical information on the 40 students whom it was programmed to teach. Leachim could synthesize human speech using Diphone synthesis. It was invented by Michael J. Freeman in 1974 and was tested in a fourth grade classroom in the Bronx, New York.

=== Post-secondary degree programs ===
From approximately 1960 through 2005, robotics education at post-secondary institutions took place through elective courses, thesis experiences and design projects offered as part of degree programs in traditional academic disciplines, such as mechanical engineering, electrical engineering, industrial engineering or computer science.

Since 2005, more universities have begun granting degrees in robotics as a discipline in its own right, often under the name "Robotic Engineering". Based on a 2015 web-based survey of robotics educators, the degree programs and their estimates annual graduates are listed alphabetically below. Note that only official degree programs where the word "robotics" appears on the transcript or diploma are listed here; whereas degree programs in traditional disciplines with course concentrations or thesis topics related to robotics are deliberately omitted.

		Estimated number of robotics degrees conferred annually				
Institution	Country	A.S.	Minor	B.S.	M.S.	Ph.D.
Arizona State University	U.S.	-	20	40	10	4
Carnegie Mellon University	U.S.	-	-	-	79	17
Georgia Tech	U.S.	-	160	-	-	16
Idaho State University	U.S.	12	-	-	-	-
Johns Hopkins University	U.S.	-	10	-	10	-
Lake Superior State University	U.S.	-	20	-	-	-
Lawrence Technological University	U.S.	-	-	10	-	-
Millersville University	U.S.	-	-	10	-	-
Northwestern University	U.S.	-	-	-	14	-
Örebro University	Sweden	-	-	-	5	3
Oregon State University	U.S.	-	-	-	10	5
Roger Williams University	U.S.	-	10	-	-	-
Rose-Hulman Institute of Technology	U.S.	-	20	-	-	-
South Dakota School of Mines and Technology	U.S.	-	5	-	3	-
Universidad Politecnica de Madrid	Spain	-	-	-	30	10
University of California - Santa Cruz	U.S.	-	-	10	-	-
University of Central Florida	U.S.	-	5	-	-	-
University of Detroit Mercy	U.S.	-	-	10	-	-
University of Genova	Italy	-	-	-	30	35
University of Liège	Belgium	-	-	-	10	1
University of Massachusetts Lowell	U.S.	-	20	-	-	-
University of Maryland	U.S.	-	-	-	10	-
University of Michigan	U.S.	-	-	-	10	5
University of Michigan-Dearborn	U.S.	-	-	10	-	-
University of Montpellier	France	-	-	-	20	20
University of Nebraska-Lincoln	U.S.	-	?	-	-	-
University of Oldenburg	Germany	-	-	-	5	1
University of Pennsylvania	U.S.	-	-	-	40	-
University of Southern California	U.S.	-	-	-	10	-
Worcester Polytechnic Institute	U.S.	-	10	95	60	5
TOTAL NUMBER OF PROGRAMS		1	10	7	15	11
TOTAL NUMBER OF ANNUAL DEGREES		12	265	140	268	83

=== Certification ===
The Robotics Certification Standards Alliance (RCSA) is an international robotics certification authority that confers various industry- and educational-related robotics certifications.

=== Summer robotics camp ===
Several summer camp programs include robotics as part of their core curriculum. In addition, youth summer robotics programs are frequently offered by celebrated museums such as the American Museum of Natural History and The Tech Museum of Innovation in Silicon Valley, CA, just to name a few. There are of benefits that come from attending robotics camps. It teaches students how to use teamwork, resilience and motivation, and decision-making. Students learn teamwork because most camps involve exciting activities requiring teamwork. Resilience and motivation is expected because by completing the challenging programs, students feel talented and accomplished after they complete the program. Also students are given unique situations making them make decisions to further their situation.

=== Educational robotics in special education ===
Educational robotics can be a useful tool in early and special education. According to a journal on new perspectives in science education, educational robotics can help to develop abilities that promote autonomy and assist their integration into society. Social and personal skills can also be developed through educational robotics. Using Lego Mindstorms NXT, schoolteachers were able to work with middle school aged children in order to develop programs and improve the children's social and personal skills. Additionally, problem solving skills and creativity were utilized through the creation of artwork and scenery to house the robots. Other studies show the benefits of educational robotics in special education as promoting superior cognitive functions, including executive functions. This can lead to an increased ability in "problem solving, reasoning and planning in typically developing preschool children." Through eight weeks of weekly forty-five-minute group sessions using the Bee-Bot, an increase in interest, attention, and interaction between both peers and adults was found in the school and preschool-aged children with Down Syndrome. This study suggests that educational robotics in the classroom can also lead to an improvement in visuo-spatial memory and mental planning. Furthermore, executive functions seemed to be possible in one child during this study.

== See also ==
- Open-source robotics
- List of open-source robotics hardware projects
- List of open-source robotics software projects
- List of robotics software
