= Todd Nunes =

American film director

Todd Nunes is an American screenwriter, a director of horror films, and novelist. His movies include the holiday horror film All Through the House and his book series called The Slasher Universe.

== Career ==
Todd Nunes wrote and directed his first horror full-length film Scary Larry in 2014, which starred his sister Ashley Mary Nunes. In 2015 he wrote and directed the award-winning holiday horror film All Through The House, produced by The Readmond Company, which again starred Ashley Mary Nunes in the lead role and also featured Canadian horror actress Jessica Cameron.

== Novels ==
Todd Nunes has published three novels in his Slasher Universe Book Series: Death Ward 13, Catholic Schoolgirls vs. Inbreeds., and The Duke All novels have received positive early reviews.

== Screenplay Awards ==
Additionally, Nunes won the Best Screenplay award for Catholic Schoolgirls vs. Inbreeds at the Hollywood Blood Horror Festival on August 5, 2024, won Best Action Horror Feature Script at the Hollywood Horrorfest on Oct 6 2024, and Best Un-Produced Feature Screenplay at the Crimson Screen Horror Film Fest in 2025 .

Nunes' next project was to be Death Ward 13 (2017), a remake of the 1973 low budget horror film The Forgotten. In 2017 it was in pre-production in Los Angeles and was to star former Misfits guitarist Doyle Wolfgang Von Frankenstein as the film's terrifying antagonist, The Duke. The film has yet to be made.

== Movie Awards ==
- All Through The House, Official Nomination, "Top Ten", Online, The Golden Rake Award for Indie Horror (2016)
- All Through The House, Best Director at the Hardcore Horror Fest, Chicago, IL (2016, won – Todd Nunes)
- All Through The House, Best Actress at the Hardcore Horror Fest, Chicago, IL (2016, won – Jessica Cameron)
- All Through The House, Best Slasher Award at the RIP Horror Film Festival, Hollywood, CA (2015)
- All Through The House, Audience Choice Award at the RIP Horror Film Festival, Hollywood, CA (2015)
- All Through The House, Best Editing Award at the RIP Horror Film Festival, Hollywood, CA (2015)
- All Through The House, Best Local Feature Award at SFindie's "Another Hole in the Head" Phenomenal Film Festival, San Francisco, CA (2015)

== Personal life ==
Nunes is the brother of horror actress Ashley Mary Nunes.
