= Scum of the Earth (1974 film) =

- Directed by: S. F. Brownrigg
- Written by: Mary Davis
- Produced by: S. F. Brownrigg
- Starring: Gene Ross; Ann Stafford; Norma Moore; Camilla Carr
- Cinematography: Robert Alcott
- Edited by: Brian H. Hooper
- Production companies: Zison Enterprises, Inc.
- Distributed by: Dimension Pictures; April Fools Films, Inc.
- Release date: June 1974
- Running time: 84 minutes
- Country: United States
- Language: English
- Box office: $1 million

Scum of the Earth is a 1974 American horror film directed and produced by S. F. Brownrigg. It was re-released under the more popular title Poor White Trash Part II.

== Plot ==
Paul and Helen Fraser arrive to stay at an isolated lakeside cabin, only for Paul to be brutally murdered by a figure with an axe. Helen discovers the body and the car keys missing, and flees into the woods. She stumbles on the home of Odis Pickett, who insists he will he phone the sheriff. Once inside the Pickett farmhouse, Odis introduces her to his pregnant wife, Emmy; daughter, Sarah; and developmentally disabled son, Bo. An exhausted Helen considers leaving the house, but instead accepts the Picketts' offer to spend the night and avoid endangering herself. In the nearby woods, a figure watches the Pickett farmhouse.

Helen looks on as Odis gets drunk on moonshine and Bo skins and boils a possum. Bo quietly accuses Sarah of prostituting herself for money, after which Sarah places a hex on him. In an adjacent room, Emmy reveals to Helen that she only married Odis because her father owed him money, and indicates that Odis is abusive toward her. Helen divulges that she had a husband prior to Paul, who presumably died in the Vietnam War. Later, Odis gropes Helen while she is sleeping. She awakens, and her screams alert Emmy and Sarah. Sarah accuses Odis of molesting her since she was twelve years old, and tells him she was castrate him if he touches Helen again.

Emmy urges Bo to go to the neighbors' home to call the sheriff. While walking through the woods, an assailant kills Bo by impaling him on a spiked fence. Meanwhile, Odis continues to get progressively intoxicated. Helen tries to quietly leave, only to find Bo's corpse on the front porch. A distraught Odis plans to bury Bo in the backyard, while Sarah accuses Helen of being a witch who has brought them misfortune. An angry Odis attempts to rape Helen, but Emmy comes to her defense, though unsuccessfully, as Odis finally assaults Helen.

The next morning, Helen awakens and unsuccessfully attempts to leave. Odis sends Sarah to the neighbors' house to call a preacher for Bo's burial. Sarah hears someone following behind her on a path, and, hoping to spare herself, calls out that she will help the assailant locate Helen. The figure approaches Sarah, only to strangle her with barbed wire. When Sarah fails to return, Emmy send Odis to find her. After he leaves, Emmy gives Helen directions to the lake, hoping to help her escape. Odis finds Sarah in the woods, clinging to life, and attempts to load his shotgun before a figure grabs him from behind and murders him. The figure then approaches the Pickett house, knocks, and enters. The killer is revealed to be Jim, Helen's first husband, who explains to Helen that he was in a prisoner of war camp in Vietnam and mistakenly presumed dead.

Still claiming Helen as his wife, Jim attempts to stab her to death, only for the mortally wounded Sarah to enter the front door and shoot him dead with Odis's shotgun. Emmy consoles a distraught Helen on the house's front porch, telling her the two still have one another at least.

== Cast ==
- Gene Ross as Odis Pickett
- Ann Stafford as Emmy Pickett
- Norma Moore as Helen Fraser
- Camilla Carr as Sarah Pickett
- Charlie Dell as Bo Pickett
- Hugh Feagin as Jim
- Joel Colodner as Paul Fraser

== Production ==
The film was made under the working title, Death is a Family Affair.

== Release ==
Initially released in 1974 as Scum of the Earth, the film was re-released in 1976 under the alternative title Poor White Trash Part II. It opened in Los Angeles, California under this title on September 8, 1976. During its second release, the film was notably more successful, and ranked among the top-grossing films at the American box-office that year.

== See also ==
- List of American films of 1974
