= Chelcie Ross =

American actor

- Born: Chelcie Claude Ross; October 26, 1942 (age 83); Oklahoma City, Oklahoma, U.S.
- Occupation: Actor
- Years active: 1976–2023

Chelcie Claude Ross (born October 26, 1942) is an American character actor, most known for Above the Law, Major League, Basic Instinct, Bill & Ted's Bogus Journey, Hoosiers, Rudy, Trouble with the Curve and The Ballad of Buster Scruggs.

Raised in Pemberton Township, New Jersey, Ross graduated in 1960 from Pemberton Township High School and played baseball at Southwest Texas State University (now Texas State Bobcats baseball).

Ross served in Vietnam as an officer in the United States Air Force where he was awarded a Bronze Star, before leaving the service in 1970. Ross later earned an MFA from the Dallas Theater Center.

== Filmography ==
=== Film ===
Year	Title	Role	Notes
1977	Keep My Grave Open	Kevin	
1981	On the Right Track	Customer	
1983	The Big Score	Hoffa	
1983	The Last Leaf	Constable	Short
1986	One More Saturday Night	Mr. Lundahl	
1986	Hoosiers	George Walker	
1987	The Untouchables	Reporter	
1988	Above the Law	Nelson Fox	
1989	Major League	Eddie Harris	
1989	The Package	General Hopkins	
1990	The Long Walk Home	Martin	
1991	Bill & Ted's Bogus Journey	Colonel Oats	
1991	The Last Boy Scout	Senator Calvin Baynard	
1992	Basic Instinct	Captain Talcott	
1993	Amos & Andrew	Earl	
1993	Rudy	Dan Devine	
1994	Richie Rich	Ferguson	
1996	Chain Reaction	FBI Agent Ed Rafferty	
1997	My Best Friend's Wedding	Priest	Uncredited
1998	Primary Colors	Senator Charlie Martin	
1998	A Simple Plan	Sheriff Carl Jenkins	
1999	Charming Billy	Raymond Starkman	
2000	The Gift	Kenneth King	
2001	Madison	Roger Epperson	
2001	Novocaine	Mike	
2001	The Majestic	Avery Wyatt	
2002	Waking Up in Reno	Fred Bush	
2003	Uncle Nino	Stewart	Uncredited
2008	The Express: The Ernie Davis Story	Lew Andreas	
2009	The Strip	Mr. Davis	
2009	Horsemen	Police Chief Krupa	
2009	Drag Me to Hell	Leonard Dalton	
2009	Formosa Betrayed	Daltry	
2011	The Dilemma	Thomas Fern	
2011	Fertile Ground	Avery	
2011	The Last Rites of Joe May	Billy Tidrow	
2012	At Any Price	Byron	
2012	Trouble with the Curve	'Smitty' Smith	
2015	Consumed	Senator Bob McHenry	
2017	Cowboy Drifter	Mortician	
2017	New Money	Boyd Tisdale	
2018	Imperfections	'Lil Pop'	
2018	The Ballad of Buster Scruggs	Trapper	Segment: "The Mortal Remains"

=== Television ===
Year	Title	Role	Notes
1978	The Awakening Land	Billy Harbison	TV miniseries
1979	Mark Twain: Beneath the Laughter	'Buck' Harkness	TV film
1981	The Children Nobody Wanted	Ralph	TV film
1987	Night of Courage	Lieutenant Beiber	TV film
1987	Jack and Mike	Polaski	"Till Death Do Us Part"
1987	Sable	Mr. Wylie	"Evangelist"
1990	Elvis	Bill Kenney	"Grand Ole Opry"
1990	Tales from the Crypt	George Yates	"Four-Sided Triangle"
1990	Rainbow Drive	Tom Cutler	TV film
1990	Gabriel's Fire	Captain Jack O'Neil	"Pilot", "To Catch a Con: Parts 1 & 2"
1990	Dallas	Dr. Wykoff	3 episodes
1991	Equal Justice	Coach Nichols	"The Devil His Due"
1992	The Burden of Proof	Dr. Nate Cawley	TV miniseries
1992	Legacy of Lies	Phil MacFarlane	TV film
1994	Against Their Will: Women in Prison	Warden Henley	TV film
1994–95	Christy	Ben Pentland	Recurring role
1996	Evil Has a Face	McGarrell	TV film
1997	Chicago Hope	FBI Agent Tom Strickler	"The Day of the Rope"
1997	Early Edition	Nick Harper	"Dad"
1999	Judging Amy	Simon McKinley	"Last Tango in Hartford"
2000	Once and Again	Warren Wyler	"Ozymandias 2.0"
2001	King of the Hill	Councilman Fred Ebberd (voice)	"It's Not Easy Being Green"
2001	Snap Decision	Detective John Collins	TV film
2003	Everybody Loves Raymond	Reverend Stevens	"Robert's Wedding"
2003	Cold Case	Henry Phillips	"A Time to Hate"
2004	JAG	Dr. Mallory	"A Girl's Best Friend"
2005	Prison Break	Bishop McMorrow	"Pilot"
2006	A Little Thing Called Murder	Ken Kimes Sr.	TV film
2007	My Name Is Earl	Mr. White	"Get a Real Job", "The Trial"
2009	The Beast	Alan Posner	"Infected"
2009	Mad Men	Conrad 'Connie' Hilton	Recurring role
2010, 2017	Grey's Anatomy	Dr. Harper Avery	2 episodes
2011	CSI: Miami	Wesley Habeck	"Hunting Ground"
2012	Boss	Royczyk	"Backflash", "The Conversation"
2012	The Mob Doctor	Seamus O'Connell	"Game Changers"
2012	Scandal	Harold Pierce	"Defiance"
2014	NCIS	Joseph Hanlon	"Crescent City: Part 2"
2014–2016	Chicago P.D.	Robert Platt	"Turn the Light Off", "All Cylinders Firing"
2019–2020	Billions	Robert Beaufort	"Infinite Game"
2022	Super Pumped	David Bonderman	Recurring role

== Other media ==
In 2008, Ross played Beverly Weston in the National Theatre production of August: Osage County.
