= Martin Jurow =

American film producer

Martin Jurrow
- Born: December 14, 1911; Brooklyn, New York, US
- Died: February 12, 2004 (aged 92); Dallas, Texas, US
- Education: College of William & Mary (BA); Harvard University (JD)
- Occupation: Producer

Martin Jurow (December 14, 1911 – February 12, 2004) was a Hollywood agent, executive assistant and film producer.

After graduating from the College of William and Mary, he received his law degree from Harvard Law School in 1936 and joined a law firm in New York with show business clients. He moved to the William Morris Agency where he became head of their film department on the East coast.

After leaving William Morris he paired up with another agent, Richard Shepherd to produce films. Their first picture together was The Hanging Tree starring Gary Cooper and Maria Schell which they followed with The Fugitive Kind, an adaptation of Tennessee Williams's Orpheus Descending, starring Marlon Brando and Anna Magnani.

They signed a six picture deal with Paramount Pictures where they made films including an adaptation of Truman Capote's Breakfast at Tiffany's.

After Breakfast at Tiffany's he produced three more films without Shepherd involving Blake Edwards - Soldier in the Rain, The Pink Panther and The Great Race.

He moved to Texas and became Assistant District Attorney in Dallas. He later returned to film and co-produced Terms of Endearment which won the Academy Award for Best Picture.

Jurow wrote his memoirs in 2001.

== Connected Family ==
Martin Jurow and his wife Erin-Jo Guinn are first cousins, by Erin-Jo, with model-actor Anne Gwynne, and first cousins once removed with Greg Gilford, her son; they were second cousins with actor Chris Pine, Anne Gwynne’s grandson. Martin and Erin-Jo were first cousins once removed with actor Robert Pine and Gwynne Gilford Pine.

== Select Credits ==
He was a producer in all films unless otherwise noted.

=== Film ===
Year	Film	Credit	Notes
1959	The Hanging Tree		
1960	The Fugitive Kind		
1961	Love in a Goldfish Bowl		
1961	Breakfast at Tiffany's		
1963	Soldier in the Rain		
1963	The Pink Panther		
1965	The Great Race		
1974	Don't Open the Door!		
1981	The End of August	Executive producer	
1982	Waltz Across Texas		
1983	Terms of Endearment	Co-producer	
1985	Sylvester		
1985	Papa Was a Preacher		Final film as a producer
