= Keep My Grave Open =

- Theatrical release poster
- Directed by: S. F. Brownrigg
- Written by: F. Amos Powell
- Produced by: S. F. Brownrigg
- Starring: Camilla Carr; Chelcie Ross; Stephen Tobolowsky
- Cinematography: Janis P. Valtenbergs
- Edited by: Jerry Caraway; Lynn Leneau
- Music by: Robert Farrar
- Production company: Wells Company
- Distributed by: Flora Releasing
- Release date: December 16, 1977
- Running time: 79 minutes
- Country: United States
- Language: English

Keep My Grave Open is a 1977 American slasher film directed by S. F. Brownrigg and starring Camilla Carr, Chelcie Ross, and Stephen Tobolowsky in his feature film debut. The film follows a deranged, murderous woman living in an isolated mansion whose brother lures victims to her. The film was reissued under the alternative title The House Where Hell Froze Over.

== Cast ==
- Camilla Carr as Lesley
- Chelcie Ross as Kevin
- Stephen Tobolowsky as Robert
- Ann Stafford as Suzie
- Sharon Bunn as Twinkle
- Gene Ross as Dr. Emerson
- Annabelle Weenick as Clara
- Bill Thurman as Hitchhiker
- Jessie Lee Fulton as Miss Evie
- Lucille Baldwin as Miss Ada
- Desmond Dhooge as Storekeeper
- Skipper Richardson as Prostitute
- Cebe Reed as Caesar

== Production ==
Filming took place in Harrison County, Texas.

== Release ==
Keep My Grave Open was released in San Angelo, Texas on December 16, 1977, as a supporting title in a double feature with From Beyond the Grave (1974), which was released under the alternative title The Creatures.
