= S. F. Brownrigg =

American film director (1937–1996)

- Born: Sherald Fergus Brownrigg; September 30, 1937; El Dorado, Arkansas, U.S.
- Died: September 20, 1996 (aged 58); Dallas, Texas, U.S.
- Occupations: Film director, film producer

Sherald Fergus Brownrigg (September 30, 1937 – September 20, 1996) was an American film director and producer.

== Biography ==
Sherald Fergus Brownrigg was born September 30, 1937 in El Dorado, Arkansas.

During the 1970s he directed several low budget horror films, such as Don't Look in the Basement (1973), Don't Open the Door! (1974), and Poor White Trash Part II (1974).

In 2001, a reviewer for the Michigan Daily called Poor White Trash Part II "the worst movie of all time."

== Filmography ==
Date	Title	Role	Notes	Ref.
1973	Don't Look in the Basement	Director, producer	Also known as: The Forgotten and Death Ward #13	
1974	Poor White Trash Part II	Director, producer	Also known as: Scum of the Earth	
1974	Don't Open the Door!	Director	Also known as: Don't Hang Up	
1977	Keep My Grave Open	Director, producer	Starring Stephen Tobolowsky	
1986	Thinkin' Big	Director		

== Adaptations and sequels ==
- In May 2008, it was announced that a remake of 'Don't Look in the Basement' was being planned by directors Alan Rowe Kelly and Anthony G. Sumner. Filming was scheduled for October 2008 in Indiana with a planned 2009 release. However, this film never came into fruition.
- In December 2013, a sequel titled 'Id: Don't Look in the Basement 2' was announced with Anthony Brownrigg, son of S.F. Brownrigg, directing. The film was shot in Texas in March/April 2014 and used several of the same locations from the original film. It was released in 2015.
- Director Todd Nunes's film Death Ward 13 (2017) is inspired by S.F. Brownrigg's movie The Forgotten and Edgar Allan Poe's The System of Doctor Tarr and Professor Fether.

== Sources ==
- Albright, Brian (2012). Regional Horror Films, 1958-1990: A State-by-State Guide with Interviews. Jefferson, North Carolina: McFarland. ISBN 978-1-476-60042-0.
