= Yaskawa Electric Corporation =

Japanese manufacturer of robots and related components

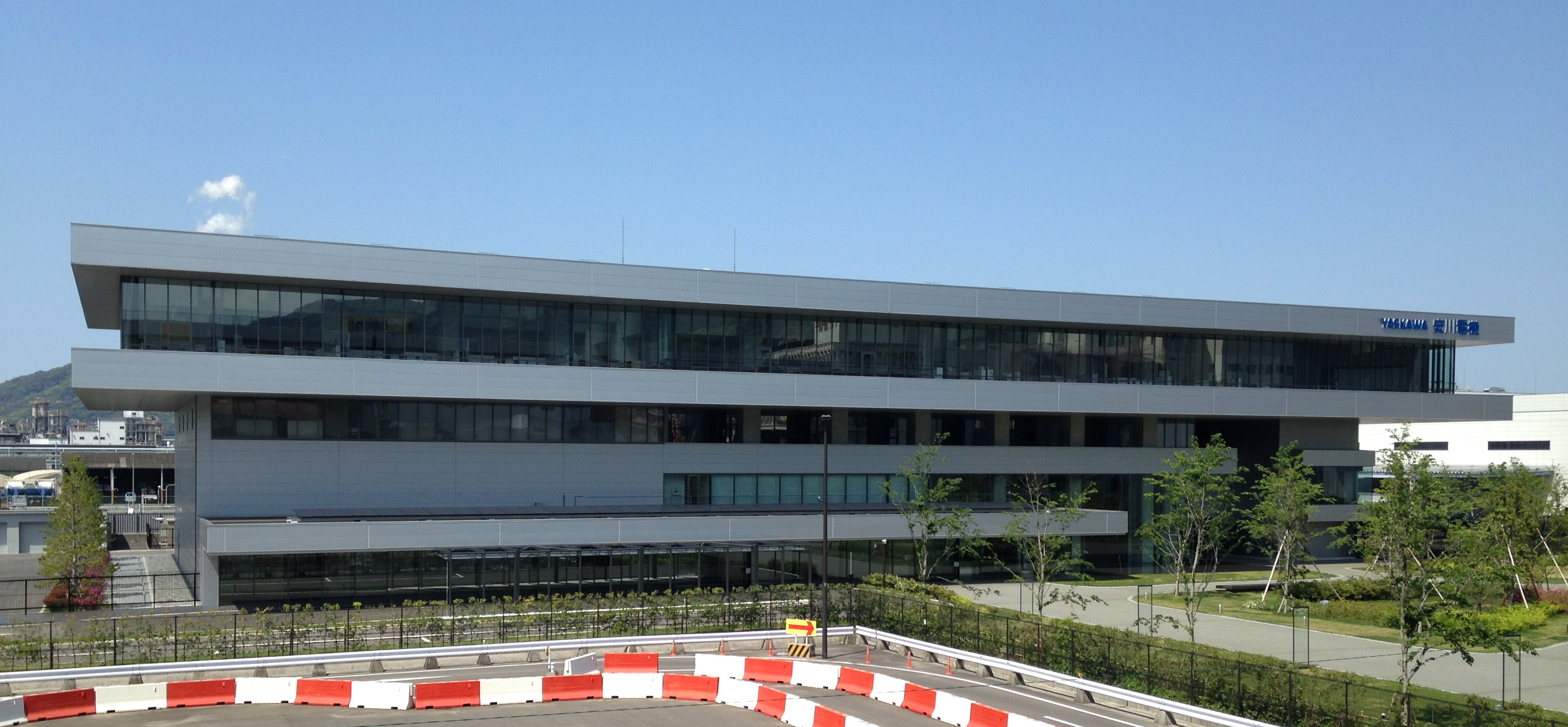
- Headquarters
- Native name: 株式会社安川電機
- Romanized name: Kabushiki gaisha Yasukawa Denki
- Type: Public (Kabushiki gaisha)
- Traded as: TYO: 6506; FSE: 6506; Nikkei 225 component (TYO)
- Industry: Electrical equipment; Robotics
- Founded: July 16, 1915; 111 years ago
- Founder: Keiichiro Yasukawa
- Headquarters: 2-1 Kurosakishiroishi, Yahatanishi-ku, Kitakyushu 806-0004 Japan
- Key people: Junji Tsuda, Chairman of the Board Hiroshi Ogasawara
- Products: AC Drives; Motion control systems; Industrial robots; Systems engineering services; IT solutions
- Revenue: ▲JPY 448.5 billion (FY 2018) (US$ 4.05 billion) (FY 2018)
- Number of employees: ▲15,287 (consolidated)(as of March 1, 2018)
- Website: https://www.yaskawa.co.jp/en/ Official website]

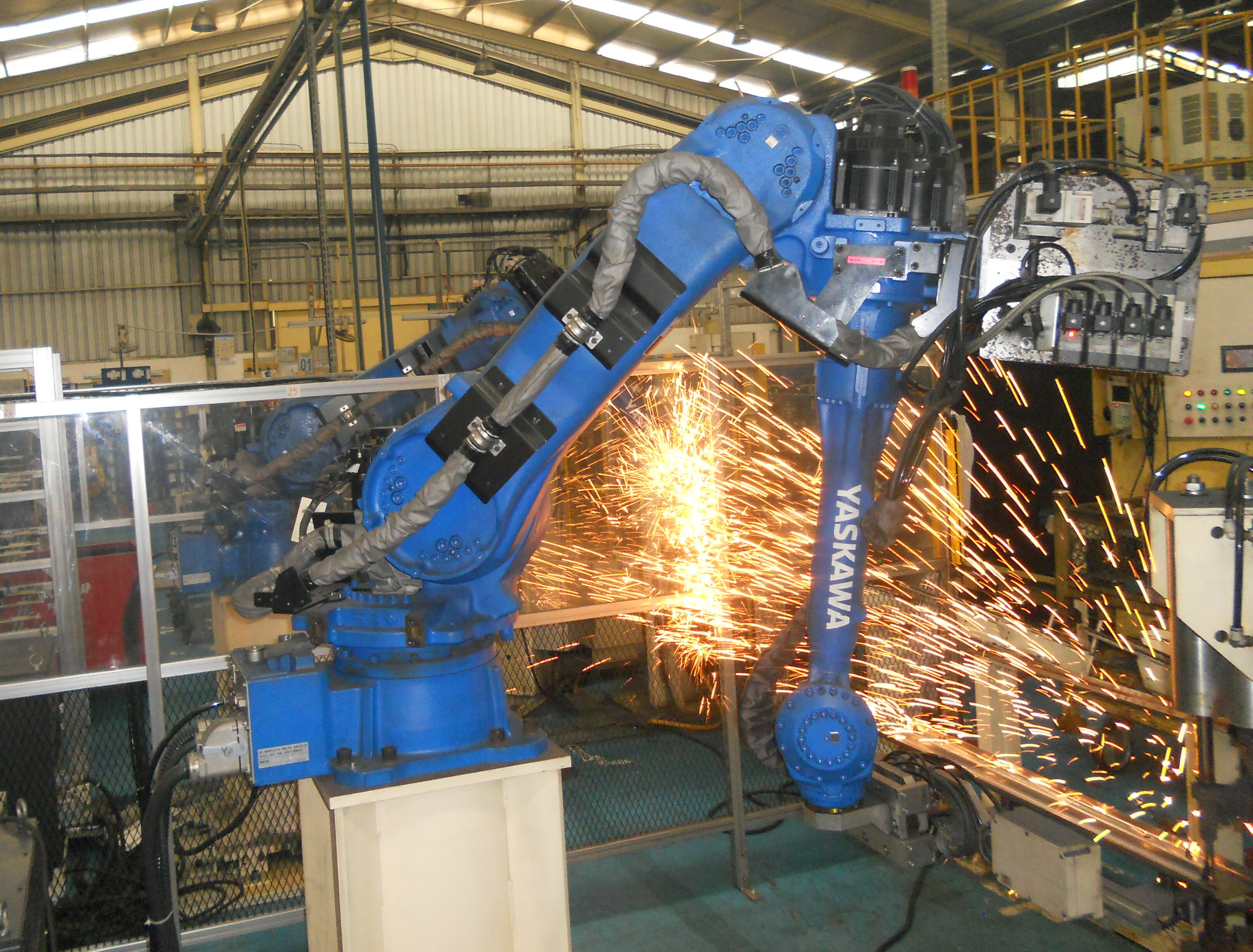
Welding robot by Yaskawa

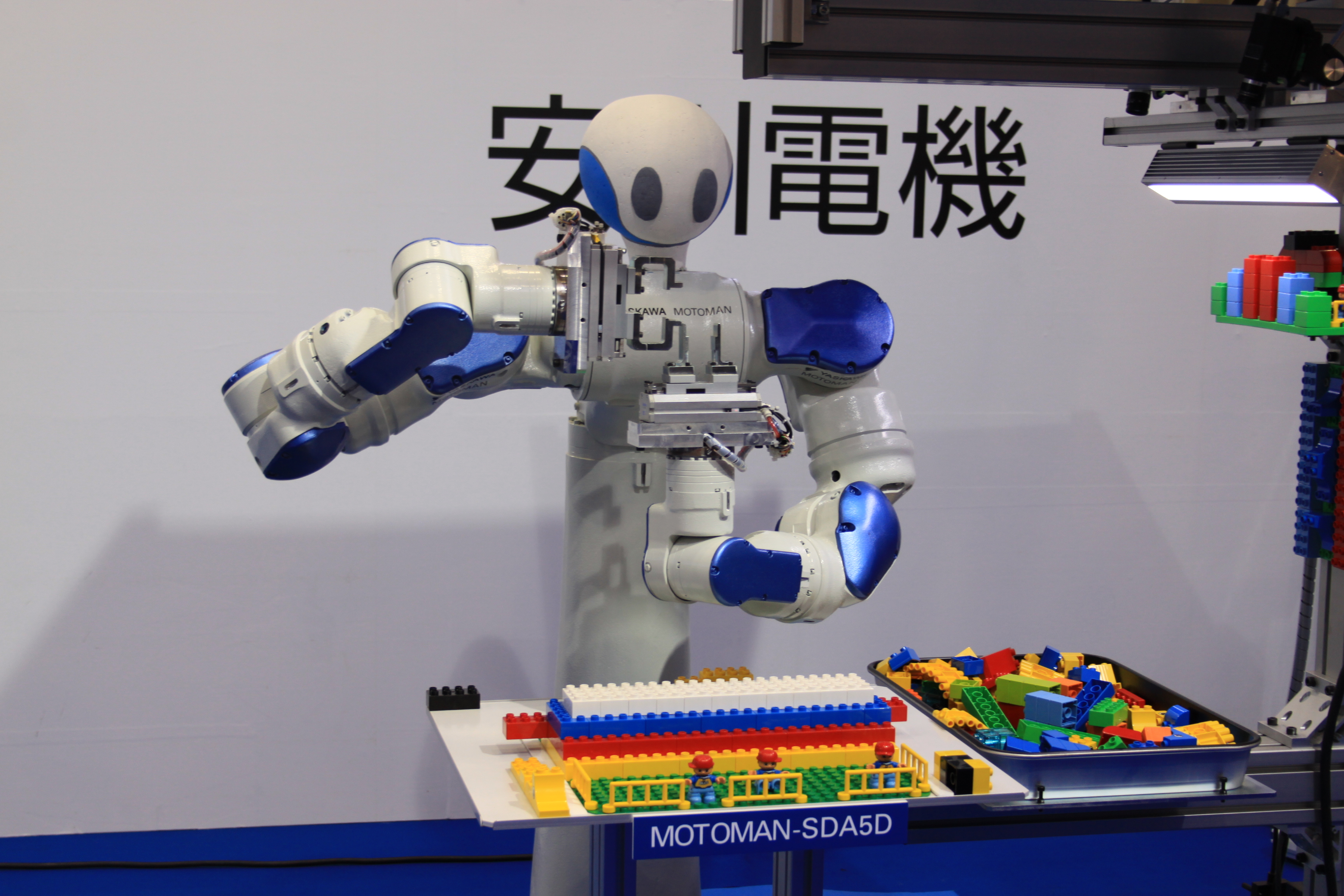
Robot with two arms SDA5, 2009

The Yaskawa Electric Corporation (株式会社安川電機, Kabushiki-gaisha Yasukawa Denki) is a Japanese manufacturer of servos, motion controllers, AC motor drives, switches and industrial robots. Their Motoman robots are heavy duty industrial robots used in welding, packaging, assembly, coating, cutting, material handling and general automation.

The company was founded in 1915, and its head office is located in Kitakyushu, Fukuoka Prefecture. Yaskawa applied for a trademark on the term "Mechatronics" in 1969, it was approved in 1972. The head-office, in Kitakyushu, was designed by the American architect Antonin Raymond in 1954.

The company is listed on the Tokyo and Fukuoka Stock Exchange and is a constituent of the Nikkei 225 stock index.

In July 2026, Yaskawa participated in a Fujitsu-led initiative with FANUC and Kawasaki Heavy Industries to develop a collaborative control platform for physical artificial intelligence using Nvidia technologies. The companies said the initial phase would begin later that year, with potential applications for intelligent robots in factories, hospitals and homes.

== Products and services ==
- Servo Drives and Machine Controllers
- AC Drives
- Robots
  - Industrial robots for various industrial processes: Selective Compliance Assembly Robot Arm (SCARA), collaborative robots
- System Engineering used in:
  - Steel plants
  - Social systems (water circulation, energy conservation, disaster prevention, mega-solar systems, hybrid electrical generation systems and energy management systems)
  - Environment & energy (power generation equipment)
  - Electrical power (electric power distribution equipment)
  - Industrial electronics
- Information Technology
- Equipment for Energy Saving and Creation

== Subsidiaries ==
YASKAWA has business hubs in 29 countries around the world and with production bases in 12 countries including Japan. There are 81 subsidiaries and 24 affiliate companies across the globe. Some of these are:

- in the Americas: Yaskawa America, Inc., Yaskawa Canada Inc., Yaskawa Electrico do Brasil Ltda., Solectria Renewables LLC
- in Europe, Africa, Middle-East: Yaskawa Europe GmbH, Yaskawa Nordic AB, Yaskawa Southern Africa (Pty) Ltd, VIPA
- in Asia-Pacific: Yaskawa India Private Limited, Yaskawa Electric (China) Co., Ltd., Yaskawa Electric Korea Corporation, Yaskawa Electric Taiwan Corporation
