= Robotics Certification Standards Alliance =

Global company

The Robotics Certification Standards Alliance (RCSA) is a global company that has been actively providing robotics curricula, training, online testing systems and certification since 1998.

RCSA first started with partnerships with Motoman and Private Career Colleges in Canada. The partnerships grew to have included ABB, Motoman and Panasonic. In 2006, RCSA was invited to join the American Welding Society (AWS) D16 committee to provide robotics and testing expertise in the development of America's first robotic welding exam (CRAW). RCSA accepted this challenge and worked alongside Lincoln Electric Automation, ABB and Wolf Robotics to develop the details and procedures of the CRAW which was launched in June 2008.

In 2009 the RCSA redesigned the AWS CRAW course to fit the needs of a global market. This International Robotic Welding Certification (Certified Robotic Welder - CRW) was developed and launched early 2010.

== History ==
- Organization founded in 1996 by Dan Thompson
- Certified Industrial Robotics Programmer (CIRP) course was established in 1999
- Industrial Partnerships with Motoman and Panasonic were formed in 1999
- Industrial Partnerships with ABB formed in 2006
- Assisted in the design and delivery of the Certified Robotic Arc Welder (CRAW) certification for the American Welding Society (AWS) in 2006
- Certified Robotic Welder Technician (CRWT) exam in development with the Canadian Welding Bureau (CWB) - Projected release early 2010
- Partnered with Embedded Training Companies (RoboticsWares & Robotech Labs) from India in 2010.
- Currently working on Projects in Korea, China, Mexico and USA.

== Industrial robotic certifications ==
The RCSA delivers certification exams, manufacturer hands-on training programs, and products and services to provide members with the ability to keep current by updating their knowledge and / or certifying them with new skills.

Recently the RCSA has crossed over from industrial to the robotics fields of Embedded, Unmanned Land/Air/Sea Vehicles, Autonomous and Vision robots. This cross over has already solidified partners in India now delivering certification to Embedded training and workshops being offered by several companies.

== Current partners ==
- Panasonic
- Motoman
- Robar Training Specialists
- Roboticwares
- RoboTech Labs
- Zaib Technologies Pvt. Ltd.

== References and sources ==
As of this edit, this article uses content from "Welcome to RCSA", which is licensed in a way that permits reuse under the Creative Commons Attribution-ShareAlike 3.0 Unported License, but not under the GFDL. All relevant terms must be followed.
