= River City Science Academy =

Public charter school in Jacksonville, Florida

Coordinates: 30.2895°N 81.5806°W

Location
- 7565 Beach Blvd. Jacksonville, Florida 32216; United States

Information
- Type: Public
- Established: 2007
- Executive director: Dogan Tozoglu
- Grades: K–12
- Campus: Urban
- Colors: Red, Navy, and White
- Nickname: River City Rockets
- Website: http://www.rivercityscience.org

River City Science Academy (RCSA) is Charter School in Jacksonville, Florida, part of the Duval County School District. The school currently has six locations in Jacksonville being Southeast, Intracoastal, Innovation, Mandarin, Elementary and, Middle High and is known for its focus on STEM curriculum.

== School grades ==
RCSA Middle-High currently has an "A" as of 2019 on the Florida School Accountability Grading Scale. RCSA Elementary currently has an "A" as of 2019 on the Florida School Accountability Grading Scale. RCSA Mandarin currently has an "A" as of 2025 on the Florida School Accountability Grading Scale. RCSA Innovation currently has a "A" as of 2025 on the Florida School Accountability Grading Scale. RCSA Southeast currently has an "A" as of 2025 on the Florida School Accountability Grading Scale.

== Academic programs ==
RCSA offers degree programs to its students including the gifted program, dual enrollment classes through Florida State College at Jacksonville and University of North Florida, the AP Capstone program, and multiple CTE electives, and debate. The debate team that they have is one that was created three years ago. They had multiple placements in the FCDI state debate championship, for both their middle and high school teams.

== Notable achievements ==
First public charter school in Duval County and surrounding areas to be granted an "A" grade by Florida Department of Education

- In 2016, RCSA Elementary took home 1st place in the Science Olympiad State Competition.
- RCSA is recognized as a Florida service-learning leader school by the Florida Department of Education
- In 2018, RCSA Middle-High's Science Olympiad Team won first place in the state of Florida and competed at the National Competition in Colorado. In 2019, the team won second place in the state of Florida and competed at the National Competition in New York.
- In 2019, RCSA Mandarin's SeaPerch Team won first place in the state of Florida.
- First public charter school to be granted high-performing status from the Florida Department of Education
- Recipient of Five Star School Award
- Recipient of School of Excellence Award
- In 2023, RCSA SeaPerch Team Aquarius earned first place in both the obstacle course and mission course, making them the overall high school stock class Champions in the RoboNation International SeaPerch Challenge held at the University of Maryland.
- In 2024, for the second year in a row RCSA SeaPerch Team Aquarius earned first place in the mission course and were the overall high school stock class Champions in the RoboNation International SeaPerch Challenge held at the University of Maryland.
- In 2024 the RCSA Model United Nations team won the award for best medium delegation, as well as a numerous amount of individual awards at the GCMUN international competition in New York.
- In 2026, all four RCSA Middle-High Science Olympiad teams placed in the top three at the Embry-Riddle Aeronautical University Regional Tournament, qualifying them for the State competition.

== Athletics ==
RCSA Middle-High students can currently participate in volleyball, basketball, and cheerleading. Middle schooler's at RCSA Innovation can participate in volleyball and basketball, and track and field. The teams are part of the Florida High School Athletic Association.

== Campuses ==
- River City Science Academy Elementary
- River City Science Academy Middle-High
- River City Science Academy Innovation
- River City Science Academy Mandarin
- River City Science Academy Intracoastal
- River City Science Academy Southeast
