= VFN =

Nematode disease resistance in tomatoes

VFN in horticulture stands for Verticillium wilt, Fusarium, and Nematode disease resistance in tomatoes. Most hybrid tomato varieties are labeled with some combination of one or more of these three letters, since disease resistance is a large part of the reason to hybridize tomatoes.
