= Don't Open the Door! =

- Theatrical release poster
- Directed by: S. F. Brownrigg
- Written by: Frank Schaefer; Kerry Newcomb
- Produced by: S. F. Brownrigg; Martin Jurow
- Starring: Susan Bracken; Larry O'Dwyer; Gene Ross; Jim Harrell
- Cinematography: Robert B. Alcott
- Edited by: Jerry Caraway; Lynn Leneau Calmes
- Music by: Robert Farrar
- Release date: May 1, 1974
- Country: United States
- Language: English

Don't Open the Door!, also known as Don't Hang Up, is a 1974 American horror film, directed by S. F. Brownrigg and starring Susan Bracken, Larry O'Dwyer, and Gene Ross. Its plot follows a young woman who returns to her hometown to care for her ailing grandmother, where she is tormented by disturbing phone calls from a deranged maniac.

Filmed in Jefferson, Texas in 1973, Don't Open the Door! was originally released regionally in Texas under the title Don't Hang Up in May 1974. It was subsequently acquired by Capital Films Corporation, who re-released it in 1979.

== Plot ==
In 1962 in Allerton, Texas, young Amanda Post awakens in the middle of the night to her mother, Rita's, dying screams, as she is stabbed to death by an unseen assailant. Amanda is confronted by the killer upon finding her mother's corpse in bed, but the murderer lets Amanda go.

Thirteen years later, Amanda receives a phone call notifying her that her grandmother Harriet is on her deathbed. She returns to Allerton for the first time since her mother's murder, arriving at her grandmother's large home. There, she is met by Dr. Crawther, as well as Judge Stemple and museum owner Claude Kern, the latter of whom is hoping to acquire Amanda's grandmother's historical home after her death. Amanda wishes to have her grandmother admitted to a hospital, but Dr. Crawther explains to do so would go against her grandmother's wishes. That afternoon, in private conversation with Claude, Stemple alludes to knowing that Claude murdered Amanda's mother years prior. Later that evening, after Amanda receives several anonymous lewd phone calls, she has her doctor friend Nick come to examine her grandmother. Nick suspects that the medication Crawther administered her grandmother has kept her sedated. While Amanda sleeps, she is awoken by the feeling of someone touching her, but Nick dismisses it as a bad dream.

At his invitation, Amanda goes to visit Claude at the local historical society museum, where he shows her a mannequin he has styled to appear as her mother. Angered and disturbed, Amanda storms out of the museum. It soon becomes clear to Amanda that Claude and Stemple are vying for her grandmother's home after Stemple offers Amanda a lump sum for it, which she angrily denies. Stemple is persistent, telling her he will return that night after she reconsiders. Meanwhile, Crawther is summoned to meet Stemple at the historical society. Upon arriving, he is bludgeoned to death by Claude, who is cross-dressed as one of the doll-like mannequins on display in the museum.

After, Claude—who, unbeknownst to Amanda, has been responsible for the anonymous calls—phones Amanda's grandmother's house again. He makes disturbing threats during the call and alludes to her mother's murder. Shortly after, Amanda is met outside by Annie, a local woman who made the original call summoning Amanda back to Allerton. The phone rings again, and Amanda rushes back inside to receive the call; this time, Claude demands that Amanda masturbate while on the line, while he caresses a doll. Amanda soon hangs up, and calls Nick at the hospital for help, but he tells her is busy and urges her to go to sleep. Shortly after, Amanda unknowingly drinks from a drugged glass of water. As Amanda loses consciousness, Stemple returns to the house, but is bludgeoned by Claude, hiding in the home's foyer.

Amanda awakens some time later, and finds what she presumes to be Nick sleeping in the guest bedroom, only to find it is a mannequin. She also discovers a photo of Crawther's bloodied corpse pinned on the wall in the kitchen. When Amanda attempts to use the phone, she is met by Claude on the line, who continues to make threats and comment on her clothing. Amanda realizes the call is coming from in the house. Moments later, she is confronted by Stemple, who has also regained consciousness; she assumes him responsible until the phone rings again. Stemple goes upstairs to investigate, but is stabbed to death. Nick subsequently arrives, and finds Amanda in a paranoid state. He chases her into the attic, where she pushes him over a bannister to his death. In a daze, she returns downstairs, where the phone rings again. Amanda, driven mad, laughs hysterically.

== Cast ==
- Susan Bracken - Amanda Post
- Larry O'Dwyer - Claude Kearn
- Gene Ross - Judge George Stemple
- Jim Harrell - Dr. Crawther
- Hugh Feagin - Nick Caprese
- Annabelle Weenick - Annie
- Rhea MacAdams - Harriet Post

== Production ==
=== Development ===
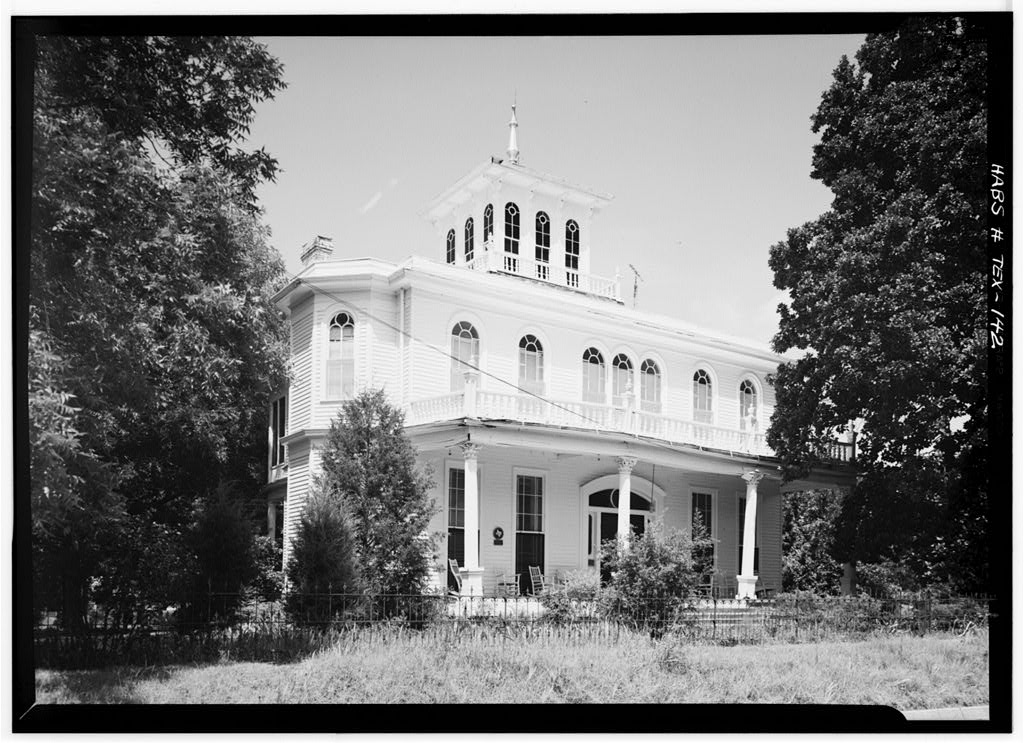
Filming took place at Texas' historic House of the Seasons

The film was one of two features director S. F. Brownrigg made with executive producer Martin Jurow, who had produced Breakfast at Tiffany's (1961). The cast consisted largely of Dallas-based actors and crew members, aside from star Susan Bracken, the daughter of comedian Eddie Bracken.

It had the working title Seasons for Murder.

=== Filming ===
The film was shot on location in Jefferson, Texas, in the late summer of 1973. The historic House of the Seasons in Jefferson served as the primary filming location.

== Release ==
Executive producer Martin Jurow attended the film's premiere in Paris, Texas on May 3, 1974. Former professional football player Langdon Viracola reissued the film in 1979 through his Capital Films Corporation, and gave himself a producer's credit on press material.

=== Critical response ===
AllMovie's review was favorable, writing "Don't Open the Door! isn't after the sheer overkill of [The Forgotten]. Instead, a festering creepiness is sustained throughout".

== See also ==
- List of American films of 1974

== Sources ==
- Albright, Brian (2012). Regional Horror Films, 1958-1990: A State-by-State Guide with Interviews. Jefferson, North Carolina: McFarland. ISBN 978-1-476-60042-0.
