= All Through the House =

2015 American slasher film

All Through The House
- Theatrical release poster
- Directed by: Todd Nunes
- Written by: Todd Nunes
- Produced by: Stephen Readmond Christopher Stanley
- Starring: Ashley Mary Nunes; Jessica Cameron; Jennifer Wenger; Lito Velasco; Melynda Kiring
- Cinematography: Ryan J. Anderson
- Edited by: Alexis Evelyn
- Music by: Irving Victoria
- Production company: The Readmond Company
- Distributed by: 101 Films (UK)
- Release date: October 31, 2015 (RIP Film Festival)
- Running time: 95 minutes
- Country: United States
- Language: English

All Through the House is a 2015 American holiday slasher film written and directed by Todd Nunes and produced by The Readmond Company. It stars Ashley Mary Nunes, Jessica Cameron, and Jennifer Wenger, and follows a masked killer dressed in a Santa Claus costume who terrorizes a neighborhood during the Christmas holiday. The film was shot in Los Angeles, San Francisco, and Lake Arrowhead, California over a period of 21 days.

All Through the House had its world premiere on October 31, 2015 at the RIP Film Festival in Hollywood, California, where it won the Best Slasher and Best Editing awards, as well as the Audience Choice Award. On October 4, 2016, the film was released on iTunes and other video-on-demand platforms by Gravitas Ventures.

== Plot ==
A Christmas-obsessed neighborhood becomes engulfed in fear when five-year-old Jamie Garrett mysteriously vanishes from her home. Citing various different explanations ranging from Krampus to kidnapping, the adult denizens of the district begin to treat the young girl's mother and her home as the stuff of a spooky, holiday-themed legend. The missing girl's house goes dark as her mother becomes a depressed recluse. The local children, mesmerized by the seemingly-haunted story, trade bedtime fears about their missing friend, eventually turning the tragedy into an innocuous fairytale.

Fifteen years later, Rachel Kimmel, a 22-year-old student, comes home for Christmas. The offbeat and slightly creepy Mrs. Garrett invites Rachel to her home as she finally emerges from her self-imposed exile, determined to make this Christmas a jovial one to be remembered, which brings Rachel's memories of the missing girl rushing back to her.

All the while, the same neighborhood is being terrorized by a faceless killer dressed in a Santa suit and mask who stalks the wintery streets- slaughtering women and castrating men. Rachel and her two best friends soon find themselves trapped in a grisly nightmare, fighting for their lives as the Santa killer's obsession zeroes in on them as well as Mrs. Garrett and her festively-decorated home.

After various terrifying encounters with the Santa killer that leave a trail of even more dead bodies behind, Rachel finally uncovers the madness behind the Santa mask and the truth behind the mysteries of the neighborhood's past. The killer's twisted revelation sends Rachel into shock as she learns her own sick connection to the Garrett family legacy.

== Cast ==
- Ashley Mary Nunes as Rachel Kimmell
- Jessica Cameron as Sheila
- Jennifer Wenger as Manny
- Melynda Kiring as Mrs. Garrett
- Lito Velasco as the Killer
- Natalie Montera as Gia
- Danica Riner as Sarah
- Jason Schumacher as Cody
- Johanna Rae as Beth
- Cathy Garrett as Abby
- Matt Poeschl as Blake
- Kelsey Carlstedt as Crissy
- Lyndon Laveaux as Adle
- Tamra Garrett as Mrs. King
- Justice Lee as Jacob
- Sarah Miller as Young Jamie
- Milijana Riner as Young Rachel
- Noah Boylen as Joseph
- John Nunes as Buddy
- Sky Boylen as Rick
- Ruff Nunes as Sugar Balls
- Panthro as Damn Cat
- Aeon as Licker

== Reception ==
All Through the House received generally positive reviews. Michael Therkelsen of Horror Society called the film "the perfect stocking stuffer, the perfect present under the tree. It's an unpredictable gorefest filled with holiday cheer and unadulterated horror." The Blood Shed states that "almost every aspect of the film is superb". The Shock Chamber praised the film, saying, "If this film was made 30 years ago it would be mentioned today in the same conversations as Black Christmas and Silent Night, Deadly Night." The reviewer also called writer-director Todd Nunes an "exceptional horror filmmaker and I look forward to seeing him crank out many more projects." The UK's Bloody Flicks reports that, "All Through the House isn't perfect but it revels in its flaws and creates a rip roaring sleigh ride straight to hell."

== Awards ==
- Best Artwork & Design, Action on Film International Film Festival, Los Angeles, CA (2016)
- 2nd Place, Best Horror Film, Action on Film International Film Festival, Los Angeles, CA (2016)
- 2nd Place, Best Actress (Ashley Mary Nunes), Action on Film International Film Festival, Los Angeles, CA
- Best Supporting Actress (Feature), Genre Blast Film Festival, Culpeper, VA (2016, won – Melynda Kiring)
- Best Director, Hardcore Horror Fest, Chicago, IL (2016, won – Todd Nunes)
- Best Actress, Hardcore Horror Fest, Chicago, IL (2016, won – Jessica Cameron)
- Official Nomination, “Top Ten”, Online, The Golden Rake Award for Indie Horror (2016)
- Best Slasher Award, RIP Horror Film Festival, Hollywood, CA (2015)
- Audience Choice Award, RIP Horror Film Festival, Hollywood, CA (2015)
- Best Editing Award, RIP Horror Film Festival, Hollywood, CA (2015)
- Best Local Feature Award, SFindie's “Another Hole in the Head” Phenomenal Film Festival, San Francisco, CA (2015)
